= Frank Fools Crow =

Oglala Lakota civic and religious leader (c. 1890-1989)

Grandfather Frank Fools Crow
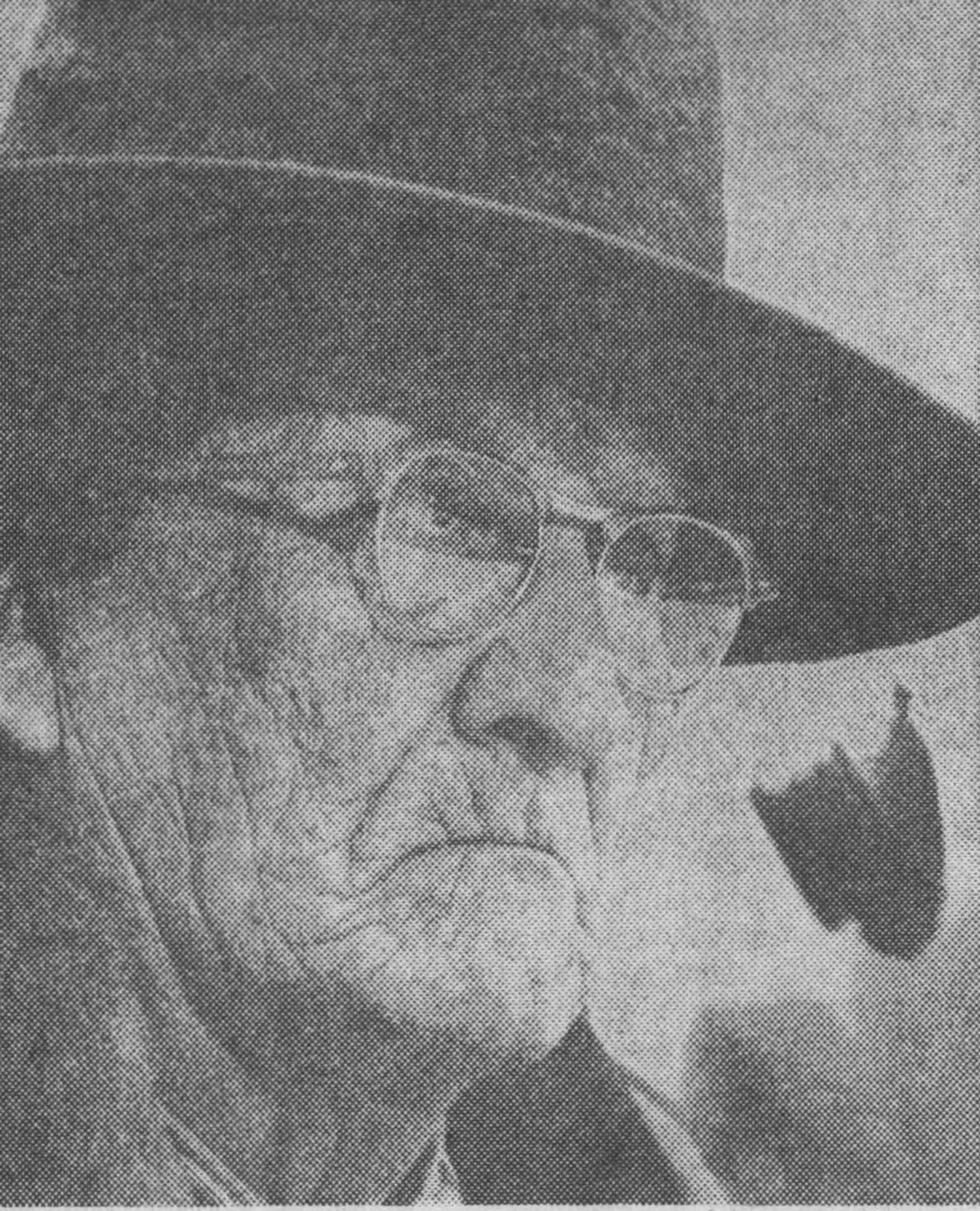
- Fools Crow in 1973
- Born: Frank Fools Crow c. 1890; Porcupine Creek, Pine Ridge, South Dakota, U.S.
- Died: November 27, 1989 (aged 98–99); Kyle, South Dakota, U.S.
- Other name: Grandpa Frank
- Occupation: Religious leader
- Years active: 1915–1989
- Movement: Lakota nationalism
- Spouses: Fannie Afraid of Hawk (m. 1916; died 1954) Kate Fools Crow (m. 1958; died 1988)

Frank Fools Crow (c. 1890 – 1989) was an Oglala Lakota civic and religious leader. 'Grandfather', or 'Grandpa Frank' as he was often called, was a nephew of Black Elk who worked to preserve Lakota traditions, including the Sun Dance and yuwipi ceremonies. He supported Lakota sovereignty and treaty rights, and was a leader of the traditional faction during the armed standoff at Wounded Knee in 1973. With writer Thomas E. Mails, he produced two books about his life and work, Fools Crow in 1979, and Fools Crow: Wisdom and Power in 1990.

== Early life ==
Fools Crow was born near Porcupine Creek on Pine Ridge Indian Reservation in South Dakota on either June 24 or 27 between 1890 and 1892. His father, Fools Crow, who was also called Eagle Bear, was the Porcupine District leader. His mother was Spoon Hunter, who died four days after giving birth to him. She was the daughter of Porcupine Tail, for whom the community was named. His paternal grandfather, Knife Chief, fought with warriors who defeated Custer at the Battle of Little Big Horn, and his great–grandfather, Holds the Eagle, was a medicine man and holy man, or Wičháša Wakȟáŋ. Raised in the traditional way by his father, aunt, and stepmother Emily Big Road, he did not attend "the white man's school" as his father did not approve. This is why he did not speak fluent English. As a young man he traveled around the United States with the Buffalo Bill Cody's Buffalo Bill's Wild West show. He spent much of his life serving his people as a medicine man, healer, and teacher.

== "Go to Wounded Knee ... " ==
In response to recent excesses of government corruption, on February 28, 1973, members of the American Indian Movement, with their allies and supporters, including Fools Crow, seized and occupied the village of Wounded Knee. It was here, in 1890, that the followers of Spotted Elk, another, earlier traditional leader, had been massacred by the United States Army's 7th Cavalry Regiment. Two weeks before that, Sitting Bull himself had been killed, by police acting at the behest of these new rulers. Thus had begun the relentless suppression of the Lakota nation: their institutions, the religion, and even the language. Each decade since that "time of great melancholy", when hopes for sovereignty had "died in bloody snow", brought renewed demands for more Lakota land, always in violation of treaty agreements.

Today my people, and all native people of this continent, are changed—degraded by oppression and poverty into but a semblance of their former being; health is undermined by disease, and the moral and spiritual life of the people deadened by the loss of the great sustaining forces of their devotional ceremonies.

— Luther Standing Bear, 1933

Dick Wilson had become chairman of the Pine Ridge Reservation in 1972. A heavy–drinking bootlegger known for corruption, he favored giving up more Lakota land, even the Pahá Sápa itself. He soon used federal government funds to create his own private vigilante "goon squad", with which to terrorize his adversaries. Those who opposed Wilson and his regime formed the "Oglala Sioux Civil Rights Organization", led by Pedro Bissonette, and worked to impeach him. One petition to impeach Wilson contained more signatures than the number of people who had originally voted for him. Wilson postponed impeachment hearings which were scheduled for February 14. Immediately thereafter, federal forces moved into the area, including a counter–insurgency "Special Operations Group", which set up and manned sand–bagged machine gun positions at the BIA building. On February 23, thus reinforced and without a proper tribal council quorum, Wilson was "exonerated" and quickly banned "all public meetings and demonstrations" on the reservation.

We called our brothers and AIM to help us because we were being oppressed and terrorized. They answered our call.

— Frank Fools Crow

On the evening leading up to the occupation, the leaders of AIM met with the traditional Oglala elders and leaders to discuss what to do next.

One by one, the Oglala Sioux Chiefs stood up, and their names will come before you ... Names like Fools Crow and Crow Dog, names like Catches ...

— Dennis Banks

As senior elder, Fools Crow spoke to the young leaders in his native Lakota language (he never spoke English in public) and said to them, "Go ahead and do it, go to Wounded Knee. You can't get in the BIA office and the tribal office, so take your brothers from the American Indian Movement and go to Wounded Knee and make your stand there."

A few minutes later the meeting at Calico ended, and the caravan, fifty-four cars long, rolled through the winter night; old people and kids and tough guys and aunts and uncles. ... Dennis Banks rode in the lead car with Chief Fools Crow, and on arrival at Wounded Knee, a hamlet of around one hundred residents, people from the car gathered at the mass grave for a prayer with movement spiritual leaders Pete Catches and Leonard Crow Dog.

— Smith & Warrior, Like a Hurricane, page 201

On the list of demands presented to the Justice Department, Fools Crow was listed along with other chiefs and medicine men as supporters of the movement. After the occupiers declared themselves to be the "Independent Oglala Nation", Fools Crow traveled with Matthew King, his interpreter, and Russell Means to the United Nations to make a speech. Though no official transcript of this speech remains, there is no doubt to its significance.

The occupation lasted for 71 days, until an agreement was reached between federal officials and a Lakota delegation, which included Fools Crow. Hank Adams, the personal representative of the President, arrived with an agreement to the proposal that the chiefs had sent to the White House on May 3. Adams met Fools Crow and a hundred others near a fence around the property. Adams handed a letter through a barbed-wire fence to Fools Crow, who was wearing the traditional attire of buckskin and a headdress. The letter appealed for the occupation of the village to come to an end. Fools Crow and the other leaders accepted the proposal, which stated that the White House would send representatives to Pine Ridge to discuss a treaty in the third week of May and would "get tough" on Dick Wilson, the unscrupulous chairman of the reservation. Fools Crow and the other chiefs delivered the letter to the AIM leaders and told them that he believed that it was time to end it.

Buddy's death, which saddened everyone, convinced Grandpa Fools Crow and the other elders that there had been enough death. Since we were too few to fight and too many to die, Fools Crow asked the Wounded Knee leaders to try to find a peaceful resolution. On May 2, a Department of the Interior negotiator stated for the record, "I do have the authority to insure that the Government of the United States, and probably Congress, will discuss anything with your chiefs, anything and everything you want to discuss about the 1868 Treaty ... I have the authority to tell you that any and all criminal violations against you by any outsiders will be prosecuted. I do have the authority to tell you that members of the tribal government will be prosecuted." ... Once again, we Indians had accepted the white man's promises—just as our ancestors had. Once again, the government of the United States of America had lied.

— Russell Means, Where White Men Fear to Tread, pages 292–293

After the murder of Frank Clearwater at Wounded Knee, and because the U.S. government would not allow his body to be buried there, his wife agreed to bury him on Leonard Crow Dog's property on the Rosebud Indian Reservation, and had the wake at Fools Crow's house, where the body was placed in a tipi and covered with a blanket for mourners to come to pay their respect.

In an article in The New York Times on May 8, 1973, the negotiations were said to have taken place at Fools Crow's house around the third week of May. In an interview, Dick Wilson said, "My people know that Fools Crow is a zero," plainly showing that he had no respect for the traditions that Fools Crow stood for. In Washington, D.C., on May 17, The Oglalas had their promised White House meeting, and Fools Crow was present. Of the five promised White House aides, two were there. Fools Crow was told that the historic treaties were dead.

Fools Crow spoke at a congressional hearing on June 16 and 17, 1973, following the conclusion of the Wounded Knee occupation; he only spoke Lakota, as was his way, and used an interpreter, Matthew King, to translate for him. He gave his reasons for the occupation, the main reason being the removal of Dick Wilson. Senator George McGovern said that he would try to remove Wilson, but was not sure if he had the power to do so. Fools Crow asserted that McGovern had promised earlier to remove Dick Wilson, yet the violence continued.

In the dark month of March 1975, at least seven people, two of them young children, perished in the AIM—goon warfare on Pine Ridge. ... Meanwhile, harassment of traditionals continued. Bullets were fired through the house of Matthew King, an Oglala elder and interpreter for Chief Frank Fools Crow, and Fools Crow's own small house in Kyle, with a lifetime's belongings, was burned to the ground; both old men were threatened with death by marauding goons.

— Peter Matthiessen, In the Spirit of Crazy Horse, page 133

== Prayer before the United States Senate ==
In August 1975, thirty activists, including Fools Crow, traveled to Washington, D.C., to discuss the 1868 Treaty, sovereignty, and the continuing violence and civil rights violations. On September 5, Grandfather Fools Crow gave the opening prayer for the United States Senate. This is believed to be an accurate translation of his words:

In the presence of this house, Grandfather, Wakan Tanka,
and from the direction where the sun sets, and from the direction of cleansing power,
and from the direction of the rising, and from the direction of the middle of the day.

Grandfather, Wakan Tanka, Grandmother, the Earth who hears everything,
Grandmother, because you are woman, for this reason you are kind,
I come to you this day to tell you to love the red men,
and watch over them, and give these young men the understanding
because, Grandmother, from you comes the good things,
good things that are beyond our eyes to see have been blessed in our midst
for this reason I make my supplication known to you again.

Give us a blessing so that our words and actions be one in unity,
and that we be able to listen to each other, in so doing,
we shall with good heart walk hand in hand to face the future.

In the presence of the outside, we are thankful for many blessings.
I make my prayer for all people, the children, the women and the men.
I pray that no harm will come to them, and that on the great island,
there be no war, that there be no ill feelings among us.
From this day on may we walk hand in hand. So be it.

During the same morning as this prayer, the FBI staged a massive paramilitary raid on the property of Leonard Crow Dog.

== "We shall never sell our sacred Black Hills." ==
On September 10, 1976, Fools Crow delivered a lengthy speech to the Congressional Subcommittee on Interior and Insular Affairs. The speech, entitled the Joint Statement of Chief Frank Fools Crow and Frank Kills Enemy on Behalf of the Traditional Lakota Treaty Council Before Honorable Lloyd Meads Sub–Committee on Interior and Insular Affairs, was a plea for the return of the Black Hills to his people. Later, the speech was printed up in poster form and widely disseminated over the reservations. The full speech can be read here.

== Family and death ==
His first wife, Fannie Afraid of Hawk, died in 1954. His second wife, Kate, died in October 1988. Fools Crow died on November 27, 1989, near Kyle, South Dakota. He is believed to have been 99 years old.

== Quotations ==
Survival of the world depends on our sharing what we have, and working together. If we do not the whole world will die. First the planet, and next the people.

The ones who complain and talk the most about giving away Medicine Secrets, are always those who know the least.

== Film, cassette, and books ==
- Screenwriter John Fusco was an adopted "hunka" relative of Fools Crow and based the character Grandpa Sam Reaches on his film Thunderheart.
- In 1990, Fusco brought actor Robert De Niro to the Pine Ridge Indian Reservation to meet Fools Crow. Fools Crow traded gifts with De Niro in the traditional Lakota manner.
- Native Spirit and the Sun Dance Way, DVD documentary, 2007, World Wisdom
- Audio Cassette: Fools Crow Holy Man (January 21, 2000)
  Original Release Date: May 1, 1993; Label: Etherean
- Books with Thomas E. Mails:
  Fools Crow, University of Nebraska Press, 1979, 1990 ISBN 978-0-8032-8174-5
  Fools Crow: Wisdom and Power, Council Oak Books, 1990, 2002; ISBN 978-1-57178-104-8
- Suzanne Dupree, Frank Fools Crow Knowledge and Truth - Gift from The Ancestors 2nd Edition, CreateSpace Publishing, 2014. ISBN 1-50304-096-8
