= Lakota Woman: Siege at Wounded Knee =

1994 drama TV film

- Film poster
- Genre: Drama
- Based on: Lakota Woman by Mary Crow Dog
- Written by: Bill Kerby; Richard Erdoes
- Directed by: Frank Pierson
- Starring: Irene Bedard
- Music by: Richard Horowitz
- Country of origin: United States
- Original languages: English; Lakota

Production
- Executive producers: Lois Bonfiglio; Robert M. Sertner; Frank von Zerneck
- Producers: Fred Berner; Steven P. Saeta
- Cinematography: Toyomichi Kurita; Christopher Tufty
- Editor: Katina Zinner
- Running time: 100 minutes

Original release
- Network: TNT
- Release: October 16, 1994

Lakota Woman: Siege at Wounded Knee is a 1994 TNT film starring Irene Bedard, Tantoo Cardinal, Pato Hoffmann, Joseph Runningfox, Lawrence Bayne, and Michael Horse and August Schellenberg. The film is based on Mary Crow Dog's autobiography Lakota Woman, wherein she accounts her troubled youth, involvement with the American Indian Movement, and relationship with Lakota medicine man and activist Leonard Crow Dog. The film is notable for being the first American film to feature an indigenous Native American actress in the starring role. Lakota Woman is also the third overall and first sound film with an entirely indigenous cast after In the Land of the Head Hunters and Daughter of Dawn.

== Plot ==
The film follows a young Mary Crow Dog and her poor Lakota family living on the Rosebud Indian Reservation in South Dakota as she briefly learns the ways of her people and of the 1890 massacre at Wounded Knee told to her by her grandfather Fool Bull (played by Floyd Red Crow Westerman). She is later put into St. Tristan Boarding School along with her sister Barbra. Mary describes her boarding school experience,

"The years passed as they tried to turn us from Lakota to white. They took away our language, the words of our elders about the history of our people and our memories grew dim. They took away our souls every day and they took our pictures once a year." One night, Barbra decides to run away, but it isn't clear where she is going. Mary is left alone without her sister.

The years dragged on as Mary endures hardships of white society, and as a Lakota girl, she wasn't so sure she wanted to learn the ways of her people, until she reads a newspaper given to her by a young white girl named Nadine (Amy Moore Davis). The paper titled "AMERICANS BEFORE COLUMBUS!" described the rape and looting of Indian lands in America. Mary prints out papers that is a sign to all Indian people in boarding schools who should turn down the white man's ways and take back their land, but she is expelled by her teachers.

Having been kicked out of school, Mary finds her way back to the Oglala Tribal Office in Pine Ridge looking for a job and her aunt Elsie Flood (Casey Camp-Horinek), but to no avail. So she goes searching for her mother and finds her living with a white man and living in the white society. She once again goes searching for a job, but the manager doesn't want to hire Native Americans (revealing the racism in South Dakota in the 1970s). With no job, or anyone who will help her, she hitches a ride with two Indian men, but while they are driving to Rosebud, the passenger attempts to rape her and she jumps out of the car. Later that evening, Webster finds her walking on the road. He picks her up and she joins his posse of drifters who drink their earnings away and drive aimlessly. After almost dying in a collision with a train, Mary decides to get her life together by joining the American Indian Movement and takes part in the 1973 Occupation of Wounded Knee. In spite of the support by various tribe members and Vietnam Veterans they're constantly preyed on by the police who sometimes snipe them at random. Among the struggles, she finds out she's pregnant. It ends with Wounded Knee being reclaimed by the police and with various members including her being arrested. Nevertheless, the mission was accomplished.

== Cast ==
- Irene Bedard as Mary
- Lawrence Bayne as Russell
- Joseph Runningfox as Leonard
- Michael Horse as Dennis
- Pato Hoffmann as Spencer
- Richard Swallow as Webster
- August Schellenberg as Dick Wilson
- Angel McFarland as Barbara
- Lois Red Elk as Gladys
- Tim Sampson as Pedro
- Floyd Red Crow Westerman as Mary's Grandfather
- Tantoo Cardinal as Mary's Mother

== Accolades ==
The film won the Western Heritage Award for Television Feature Film, 1995.

Irene Bedard was nominated for a Golden Globe Award for Best Actress – Miniseries or Television Film, but lost to Joanne Woodward.

The movie won Best Picture at the American Indian Film Festival for 1994.
