= Ellen Moves Camp =

American Indian activist (1931–2008)

Ellen L Moves Camp
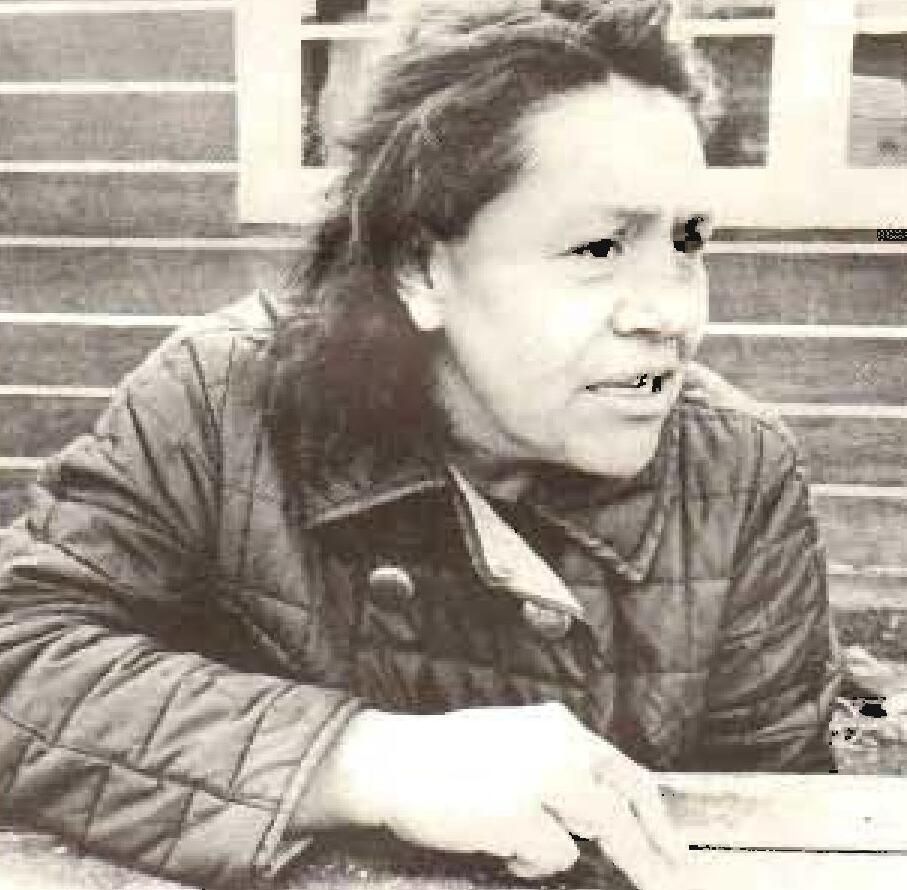
- Born: 1931; Pine Ridge Reservation, South Dakota
- Died: 5 April 2008 (aged 76–77); South Dakota, United States
- Burial place: Bear Creek
- Known for: Leader in Wounded Knee Occupation

Ellen Moves Camp (1931–2008) was an Oglala woman who played a critical role in activism for Indians in America. Her name became known when Dick Wilson, a chairman elected to oversee their reservation, started heavily persecuting the Native Americans that lived there. Moves Camp and other full-blood elders started to rally their peers and supporting groups such as the American Indian Movement (AIM) to stand up against the government. After further oppression, they met at Calico hall where multiple older women including Moves Camp urged the men to act, and planned a siege at Wounded Knee known as the Wounded Knee Occupation. This siege drew a lot of public attention, and through it, those at Pine Ridge were able to receive funding and support throughout trials and movements made from then on. Moves Camp died in 2008 at the Pine Ridge reservation after dedicating years of her life to raising awareness for her people and instilling movement into those around her.

== Early life ==
Pine Ridge Flag

Ellen Moves Camp was a full-blooded member of the Oglala Sioux tribe (Oglala Lakota) residing in the Pine Ridge Indian Reservation in South Dakota. She was also a leader of the Oglala Sioux Civil Rights Organization (OSCRO). There are many accounts of the high moral character she held before and after stepping into such an active role in her communities fight for respect and autonomy. She witnessed the increasing involvement of the United States government with her home of Pine Ridge Indian reservation specifically and how this came to impact her and her people.

== Activism ==
=== Moves Camp and Richard Wilson ===
In the 1972 election, Ellen Moves Camp was a supporter of Richard "Dick" Wilson, trusting him to lead the Pine Ridge reservation. This is primarily because throughout his campaign he made false promises of money and security. He wore his hair long and feigned support of the American Indian Movement only to buzz it shortly after his election. Moves Camp greatly regretted her advocacy for Wilson when, following his election, he revealed his tyrannical ways.

Once elected, Wilson created a band of men titled Guardians of the Oglala Nation, or the GOON squad who were incredibly violent to anyone on the reservation who expressed any opposition to Wilson. Wilson claimed that their purpose was to protect, but the GOON squad was dangerous and oppressive, known for damaging property and arresting people for minor reasons. Moves Camp shared that those in the reservation felt a need to carry guns with them due to the lack of protection. Moves Camp and her tribe experienced a time where hospitalization wasn't uncommon, and she recalled houses being burnt down. In a strange twist of irony, Pine Ridge full-bloods like Ellen Moves Camp united with the members of the American Indian Movement because of Wilson. Needing numbers and strength, Moves Camp and her peers joined forces with AIM members to protest Wilson as he became increasingly and openly opposed to both groups. The leaders of Pine Ridge officially decided to team up with AIM members following an FBI raid on Calico Hall after they were given a false lead about weapons being stored there. Despite the risk that AIM members sometimes held, those in Pine Ridge decided to work together to fight the cruel practices of Wilson and the Bureau of Indian Affairs.

=== Calico Hall ===
Flag of the American Indian Movement

Alongside Gladys Bissonette and other older women from Pine Ridge, Moves Camp spoke at a meeting held in the community center called Calico Hall in protest of Richard Wilson, as he had banned the AIM organization from meeting on the reservation. These older women, known as the "Grandmas of the American Indian Movement (AIM)", called for meetings with AIM members to discuss the next course of action. They brainstormed the idea to take a stand at Wounded Knee, the same location as the previous massacre in 1890. This idea was one had by the women, as they were noted to be the true force pushing for movement. At this event, Ellen Moves Camp and Gladys Bissonette compelled the Lakota citizens in attendance to step up and fight back against the mistreatment they were experiencing. They expressed to their people that they believed that as a tribe, they had "forgotten how to fight". These efforts by Moves Camp to rally hundreds of Indians to Wounded Knee led to a lot of publicity raised on behalf of the Native Americans. While there were many movements around that time that were creating a foundation for this movement, Calico Hall definitely started a movement that gave the public ears to listen, and the Indians a chance to speak.

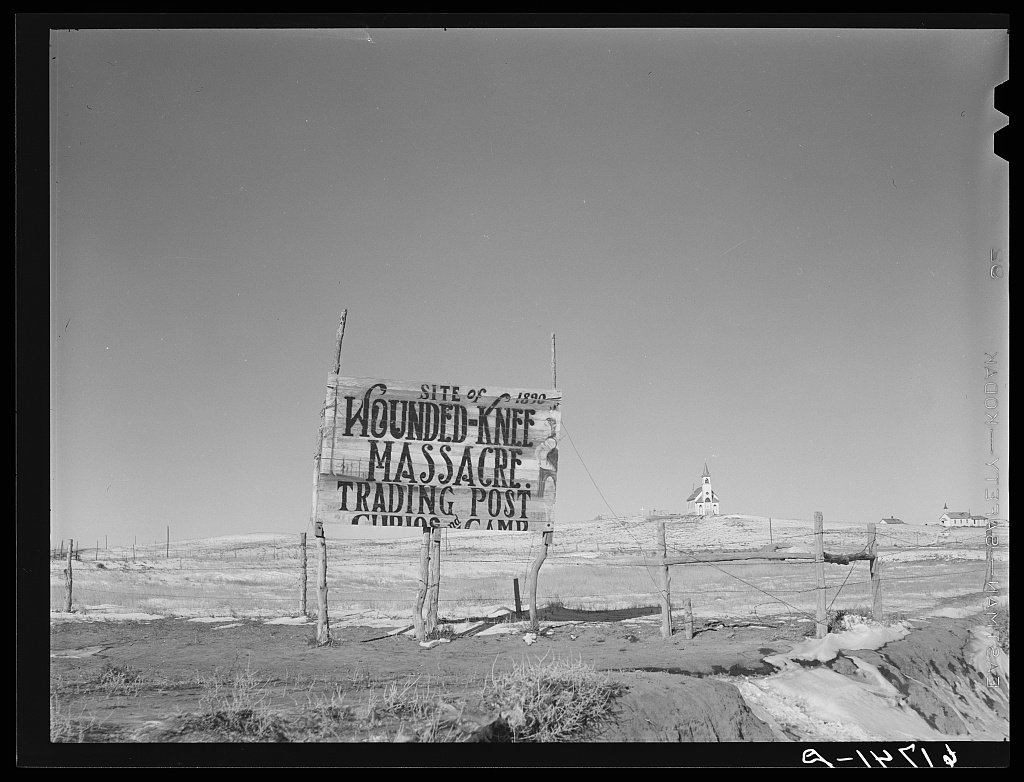
Wounded Knee, South Dakota. Trading sign with church in distant background circ. 1940. About 30 years before Wounded Knee Occupation.

=== Wounded Knee Occupation ===
The Wounded Knee Occupation, known as the "Second Wounded Knee", began in February 1973 and lasted for 71 days. It consisted of many Native Americans, namely members of AIM or those led by Oglala chiefs, who met at Wounded Knee in protest of maltreatment at the hands of Dick Wilson. They were quickly surrounded by the FBI and Wilsons GOON squad. Moves Camp played a huge role in urging the AIM leaders to act, and inspiring others to join their cause. Moves Camp also stayed an active part of the siege, greeting newcomers warmly in the midst of such uncertainty, helping to deliver a baby, and driving a get-away car for longtime AIMs leader Dennis Banks. In addition to these roles, Moves Camp also played a primary negotiator with government leaders. This movement is what gained so much media attention, and led to the trials where Native American voices were heard.

==== Trials ====
Throughout the Wounded Knee Occupation, many individuals present were arrested and to be tried in court. In 1974 AIMs leaders Dennis Banks and Russell Means were some of the first of seven leaders to be tried on charges of conspiracy on behalf of many who were involved in the Wounded Knee Occupation and the Indian movement. The trial took nine months as Means' and Banks' defense fought against allegations of criminal activity while simultaneously catching the public eye with the experience and maltreatment of the Native Americans. One of the biggest disruptions of this long trial was a result of a surprise witness, Louis Moves Camp. Louis, or Louie, was the son of Ellen Moves Camp, and made claims that he had been a first-hand witness to them committing multiple alleged crimes despite him not being in town for most of them. Ellen Moves Camp arrived soon thereafter and was quickly upset, causing a huge scene that got her arrested. She knew her son wasn't telling the truth and suspected that he was being coerced by the FBI to testify rehearsed lies, which was later revealed to be true. Upon arriving, Ellen Moves Camp marched across the courtroom towards her son in hysterics, begging him to stop.

Moves Camp was then forced out of the courtroom, arrested, and fainted as members of AIMs rushed to her aid. She was later reported to have talked with and apologized to Judge Fred Nichol, explaining that she had been upset by her son's lies and insisted he didn't sound like himself. Recovered from this incident, Ellen Moves Camp later was cross examined where she denied seeing weapons in the village and stuck to her word that she had never noticed any even after being shown pictures. This notedly shook Moves Camp's credibility which was later used against their case, ending her documented direct involvement in the trials.

== Family ==
Ellen Moves Camp has six children, five sons and one daughter. Her sons are Sam, Vern, Louis, Jim, and Mike Moves Camp, and her daughter is Germaine Moves Camp. Moves Camp also had several siblings, including Louie Winters, Willard Winters, Eugene Winters, and Lucille Schaffer. She was reported to have 34 grandchildren and 39 great-grandchildren at the time of her death in 2008.

== Death ==
Ellen Moves Camp continued to serve and improve her Sioux and Oglala community up until her death in 2008. She died at the Bennett County Health Care Center in South Dakota on April 5, 2008.

== Impact ==
Ellen Moves Camp is seen to have had a significant impact in various spheres of activism: as a member of OSCRO, recruiting AIM, rallying at Calico Hall, and supporting the Wounded Knee Occupation. Moves Camp's involvement in AIM encouraged the Oglala to stand up against the mistreatment of their people at the hands of the U.S. government and its elected officials. In addition to this, AIM and Moves Camp's contributions to the movement marked a rise in both attention to and progression of Indian activism and civil rights to a level higher than had been seen in previous years. The role that Moves Camp played in the Wounded Knee Occupation and related activism efforts influenced the way that civil rights regarding Native Americans was viewed during this time of United States history. Through these organisations as well as her service at the Wounded Knee Occupation, Ellen Moves Camp was able to influence the way that situations between the government and the Sioux played out and resolved. She stood as an example and an influence for good in her community and in the way her nation fit into, and shaped, history.
