= Carter Camp =

American activist

Carter Camp (August 18, 1941, Pawnee, Oklahoma – December 27, 2013, White Eagle, Oklahoma) (Ponca Tribe of Oklahoma) was an American Indian Movement activist. Camp played a leading role in the 1972 Trail of Broken Treaties that traveled to Washington, DC, where protesters took over the Department of Interior building. Camp was also one of the organizers of the 1973 Wounded Knee occupation on the Pine Ridge Indian Reservation in South Dakota, to highlight the Lakota desire for sovereignty.

In his later years Camp opposed the construction of the Keystone Pipeline, an oil pipeline proposed from the Western Canadian Sedimentary Basin in Alberta to refineries in Illinois and Texas.

== Life ==
Carter Augustus Camp was born to Woodrow Camp and Jewell McDonald in Pawnee, Oklahoma, on August 18, 1941, the third of six children of the Ponca family. His brothers Craig Camp, Dwain Camp, and Cordell Camp and sister Casey Camp-Horinek survived him. His sister Darlena Overland preceded him in death. His father Woodrow Camp was a union activist.

Camp was sent away to Indian boarding school, under Federal policy intended to "Christianize" Native American children in those years. He graduated in 1959 from the Haskell Institute, now known as Haskell Indian Nations University, in Lawrence, Kansas.

According to his sister Casey Camp-Horinkek, in 1960–1963 Carter served as a corporal in the U.S. Army, stationed in Berlin. He lived in Los Angeles after his discharge, working as an electrician in a factory and serving as shop steward for the union.

He married Linda Carson. They had several children together: Kenny, Jeremy, Victorio, Mazhonaposhe, Ahmbaska, and Augustus.

Becoming politically active, Camp joined the American Indian Movement when it was founded in 1968. He organized the first AIM chapters in Kansas and Oklahoma.

With AIM, he helped lead the 1972 Trail of Broken Treaties protest, which led a caravan from the West Coast across the country to Washington, D.C.. During the caravan, Hank Adams wrote the Twenty Points document, which had demands for the federal government. After the caravan reached the capital, activists occupied the Bureau of Indian Affairs national headquarters building. They presented the Twenty Points document to top BIA officials.

In 1973, Camp helped organize the occupation of Wounded Knee on the Pine Ridge Indian Reservation. He led the first group of AIM members as they seized the trading post in the village, cut phone lines, forced Bureau of Indian Affairs staff to leave town, and took eleven hostages. Camp was one of the primary organizers, along with Dennis Banks and Russell Means, and he acted as the action's spokesperson. Camp signed off on the agreement ending the occupancy, although not all his fellow activists did. For his actions, Camp was charged and convicted of "abducting, confining, and beating four postal inspectors." He served three years in prison. Camp's sister, Casey Camp-Horinkek, disputes the charges of the alleged assault.

Camp was elected chair of AIM in August 1973, but was expelled shortly afterward after a controversial conflict with fellow AIM leader Clyde Bellecourt; Camp took much of AIM's Oklahoma support with him.

After his time in AIM, Camp continued his activism. For over twenty years Camp was an organizer and participant in the annual sun dance held in the Rosebud Indian Reservation, along with Leonard Crow Dog. The latter was also one of the Wounded Knee occupiers. Camp also organized and protested against a Lewis and Clark Expedition re-enactment and a motorcycle bar near his Oklahoma reservation.

Camp was involved in a variety of environmental actions. He organized support against construction of the Keystone Pipeline, designed to run from the Canadian Sedimentary Basin in Alberta to refineries in Illinois and Texas. He also opposed siting hazardous waste dumps on Native American lands.

Camp died in Oklahoma after a yearlong battle against cancer.

== Legacy ==
- In 2009, Camp was interviewed as part of the PBS production, American Experience: We Shall Remain – Wounded Knee, about the American Indian Movement.

== Further research ==
- "Wounded Knee: We Shall Remain", American Experience, 2009
- Robert Burnette and John Koster, The Road to Wounded Knee (1974)
- Vine Deloria, Jr., Behind the Trail of Broken Treaties: An Indian Declaration of Independence (1974 Delacorte Press, New York).
- Peter Matthiessen, In the Spirit of Crazy Horse (1983)
- Matthias André Voigt (2024). Reinventing the Warrior: Masculinity in the American Indian Movement, 1968-1973, Lawrence, KS: University Press of Kansas. (ISBN 978-0-70063-697-6).
