= Nathan Farb =

American photographer (1942–2026)

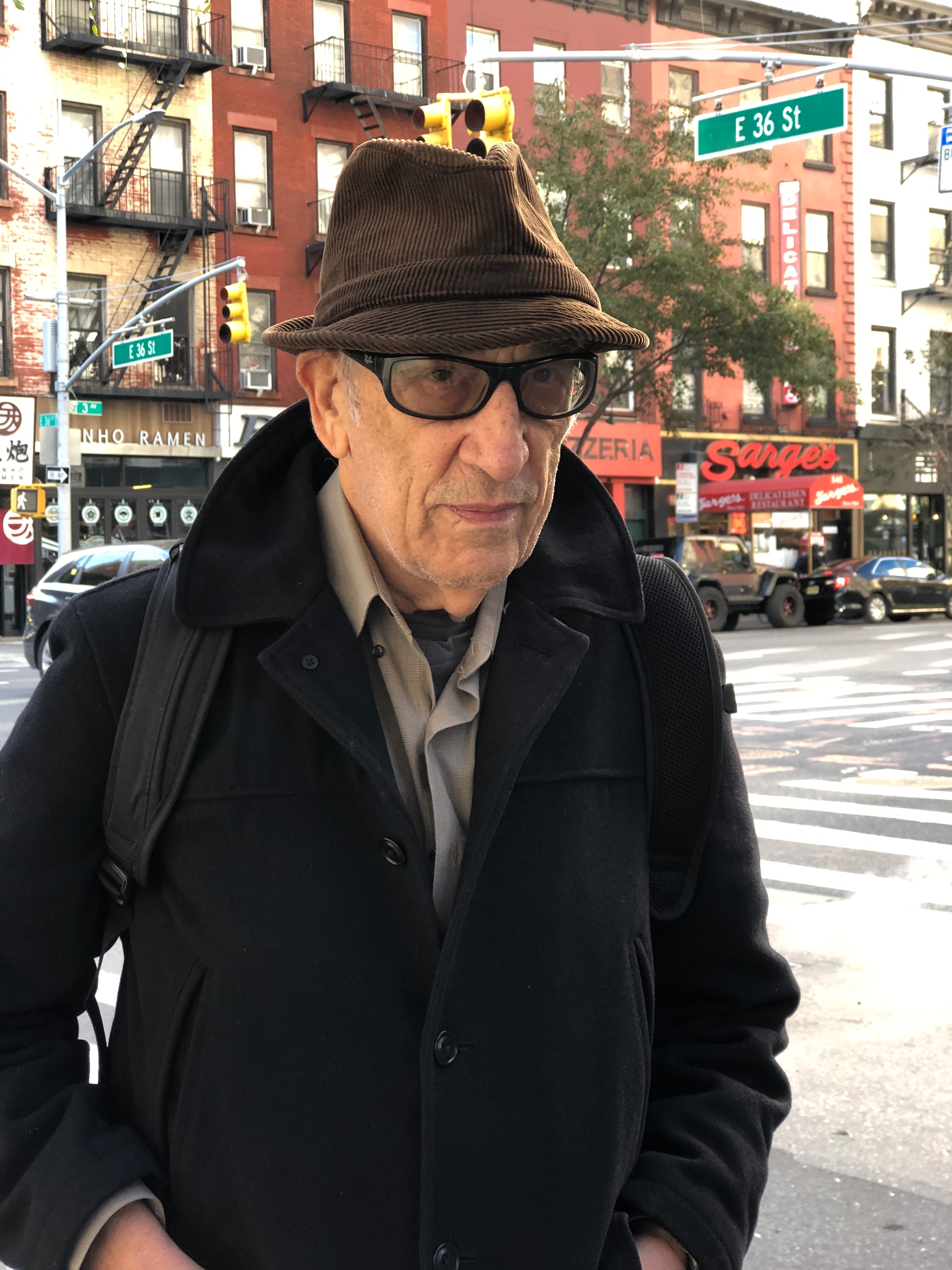
- Farb in 2019
- Born: Nathan Edwin Farb; January 18, 1941; Konawa, Oklahoma, U.S.
- Died: March 26, 2026 (aged 85); Jay, New York, U.S.
- Education: Rutgers University
- Occupation: Photographer

Nathan Edwin Farb (January 18, 1941 – March 26, 2026) was an American photographer. Over the course of his career, he photographed numerous subjects including 1960s counterculture, people in the Soviet Union, and landscapes of the Adirondack Mountains.

== Early life and education ==
Farb was born in Konawa in Seminole County, Oklahoma, on January 18, 1941. His father, also named Nathan Farb, owned a jewelry and clothing store, and died by suicide before he was born. His mother was Bertha Eisen Farb, a music teacher who was a violinist and conducted the high school orchestra in Konowa. She moved with Nathan to Lake Placid, New York, when she married Alfred Kahn, a Talmudic scholar and a Modern Orthodox rabbi who was 25 years older than she. After their marriage, his mother and stepfather moved to a blue-collar area of Lake Placid, a town with a small Jewish population. There Farb encountered anti-Semitism, and when he was eleven he was stripped of his clothes and beaten by neighborhood boys.

Years later, Farb's close friend, the author and journalist Alex Shoumatoff, recalled in an interview:

His mom found in a Jewish newspaper an ad from a widowed rabbi who was looking for a wife, and they got married and moved up to Lake Placid, where he was the rabbi for the small Jewish community, which included Richard Adler, the musical song-writer of "Damn Yankees" fame, and sometimes, in the summer, Albert Einstein, who was more often in Saranac Lake, though.

According to Christopher Shaw, the editor of Adirondack Life Magazine, when the required quorum of ten Jewish adults, called a minyan, could be assembled at the small synagogue in Lake Placid, which happened mostly in the summer, Kahn would conduct services. During the winter there were usually not enough Jewish men in the village to read the Torah. Consequently, Kahn served as an itinerant Jewish chaplain to several sanitariums in the villages of Tupper Lake and Saranac Lake, both within the boundaries of Adirondack Park. Because he didn't drive, Bertha drove Kahn to the various communities he served, and young Nathan had to come along. While his parents were at services, Nathan would go into the woods nearby, where he connected with nature—hiking and camping in the Adirondacks became a formative part of his life. When his stepfather died in 1955, his mother moved with him to New York City, then across the river to Hackensack, New Jersey. He attended Rutgers University, where he earned a degree in psychology.

== Career ==
After graduating from Rutgers, Farb worked at the School of Social Work at Columbia University, as a computer programmer for the US government's Head Start program, and as a reporter for The Record of New Jersey. In 1967, Farb bought a Pentax camera and began photographing the Lower East Side of New York. He photographed old world residents and new, and was drawn to events that occurred in the East Village during the major social phenomenon in the US known as the Summer of Love.

In 1971, Farb photographed himself seated beside Henry Crow Dog, a Lakota Sioux medicine man, in the vintage 1950s Suburban he had driven to the Pine Ridge Reservation in South Dakota. Crow Dog was an elder of the Native American Church who served as a spiritual guide to leaders of the American Indian Movement. Farb took the photograph using a Nikon camera mounted with a 35mm lens on his dashboard; the image was part of his "Vision Quest" multimedia project, an installation created for the Ausable River Valley Studio Tour. The day before the photograph was taken, Crow Dog and his wife had celebrated their 50th wedding anniversary. Farb recounted:

At the peyote ceremony, I was one of two Anglos there. I was learning about vision quest. The very thing I'm doing is back to the '60s. It's totally about stripping yourself of your ego and going into nature.

According to Christopher Shaw, he was still working on the project in 2022.

Farb made his breakout onto the New York cultural scene in 1971 at Joe Papp's Public Theater with a seven-projector multimedia piece, "Together we are Lockport", a portrait of middle America created with his wife Judith.

Farb built a reputation with his avant-garde multimedia work in New York City where he lived and worked for many years before he moved back to the Adirondacks. He taught at Rutgers in the 1970s and at the New School in the 1980s while working as a freelance photographer for a number of publications including Life, Audubon, and The New York Times. In 1977, Farb traveled the USSR during the period of détente in which tensions were eased between that country and the United States. He was invited to replace another photographer in an exhibition sponsored by the United States Information Agency titled "Photography USA", a traveling display of photos of American life and photographic technology, which toured six Soviet cities. While in the city of Novosibirsk in Siberia, he set up a photography studio where he photographed hundreds of the city's residents from all occupations and ages. The images were captured using a large format 4x5 camera with Polaroid film. He gave the positive image to the subjects and took the negative images back to the United States where a selection was published in the 1980 book The Russians: An American Photographer Looks at the Soviet People.

In his late 30s, Farb began to focus his photography on the Adirondack Mountains in upstate New York. He felt that the best, most spectacular scenery of the region was far from the areas most people visit. He carried his large format 8x10 Deardorff view camera and loaded film packs into the wilderness, where he shot painterly landscapes of the mountains, creating images with deep depth of field and detail that revealed the "natural wonders he had discovered as a child".

Describing his work in 2022, he stated that he was "trying to make images that would represent points where you could meditate". According to Robin Caudell writing in The Press-Republican, Farb began taking photos with "a series of Apple phones", the iPhone 12 Pro Max, 15 Pro Max, and 16 Pro Max, in his later years.

Farb published many essays and two books on the Galapagos Islands. His coverage of the Yellowstone fires of 1988 and the Exxon Valdez oil spill in 1989 for the New York Times Magazine made his reputation as an "interpreter of nature". In 2004, he collaborated with The Nature Conservancy on his book, Adirondack Wilderness. His works are exhibited in the Museum of Modern Art (MoMA) in New York City and in many private and public collections. In 2024, a documentary film was released titled Nathan Farb and the Cold War. It explores the events of the 1977 trip Farb took to the Soviet Union and a return visit he made 41 years later.

== Exhibitions ==
The Photography Database lists these Nathan Farb exhibitions:

- "Alan Dennis, Nathan Farb", New York, New York, October 6–November 3, 1974
- "Soviets: Photographs of the Russian People", New York, New York, November 1–26, 1978
- "Sacred Spaces: The Adirondack Vision of Nathan Farb", Richard F. Brush Art Gallery, Canton, New York, January 27–February 21, 1997
- "Making the Scene: The Midtown Y Photography Gallery, 1972–1996", New York, New York, April 27–September 16, 2007
- "The Russians", Culver City, California, November 19, 2017–April 20, 2018
- "Polaroids", Germany, Berlin, March 7–July 27, 2025

The photographs in Farb's photo-essay series, The Russians (1977), were first exhibited in 1979 at the Midtown Y Gallery in New York.

Farb's Summer of Love collection of photographs was shown in the "A Photographer's Journal" exhibition in 2007 at the Richard F. Brush Art Gallery at St. Lawrence University.

Farb displayed the series again at the Wende Museum's "Face to Face" exhibition in 2015. Oleg Ivanov, writing in the Los Angeles Review of Books, wrote at the time that "Rather than candidly portraying average Russians, Farb instead manipulates his subjects to create a menagerie of eccentric, vibrant, and outlandish characters that undermine official depictions of life behind the Iron Curtain by authorities on both sides of it. Instead of an austere portrait gallery of proudly defiant workers and citizens, Farb's black-and-white photographs, at once contrived and true to life, reveal the color and character of everyday Soviet existence."

The Russians series was again exhibited at the Wende Museum of the Cold War in 2018. According to Huck Magazine, Farb first thought of creating such a series when he was making photo buttons on the streets of New York City. Huck quotes him as saying "There was really something special when you were doing the portraits for the people and not for yourself as a journalist or an artist. I never studied photography; I went to graduate school in psychology. There is something about being fascinated by human character and motivation. We are endlessly complicated."

This was the period when Farb began to experiment with the black-and-white Polaroid positive/negative film. He said in an interview, "I found I was getting something when I was photographing people. [...] I found that when I was making the photograph for the person that they were going to have and they were going to take home, I found I was getting better, getting something more real, something more truthful than if I did it as a photojournalist or as a art photographer. When I was doing it for the person, I was getting something better."

The "Water Makes Its Way: Adirondack Photographs by Nathan Farb, Eliot Porter, and Gary Randorf" exhibition was mounted at the Richard F. Brush Art Gallery in 2018.

== Personal life and death ==
According to James Estrin, in 1963 Farb went to the Lower East Side of New York for the first time to see a Lenny Bruce show. He arrived "searching for adventure and his Jewish roots", and regretted that he was "too late for the Beats and too early for the hippies, [...] Everybody was talking about revolution, [...] but I only wanted to be part of a revolution you can dance to". Estrin says he rode a motorcycle and provided cannabis to his "intellectual friends" who were "discussing everything from Buddha to Marx to Mailer".

Farb's life partner was Kathleen Carroll, a former film critic for The Daily News. He and Judith Sergel had a daughter and stepdaughter.

Farb died at his home in Jay, New York, on March 26, 2026, at the age of 85.
