= Bureau of Indian Affairs building takeover =

1972 Native American protest in Washington

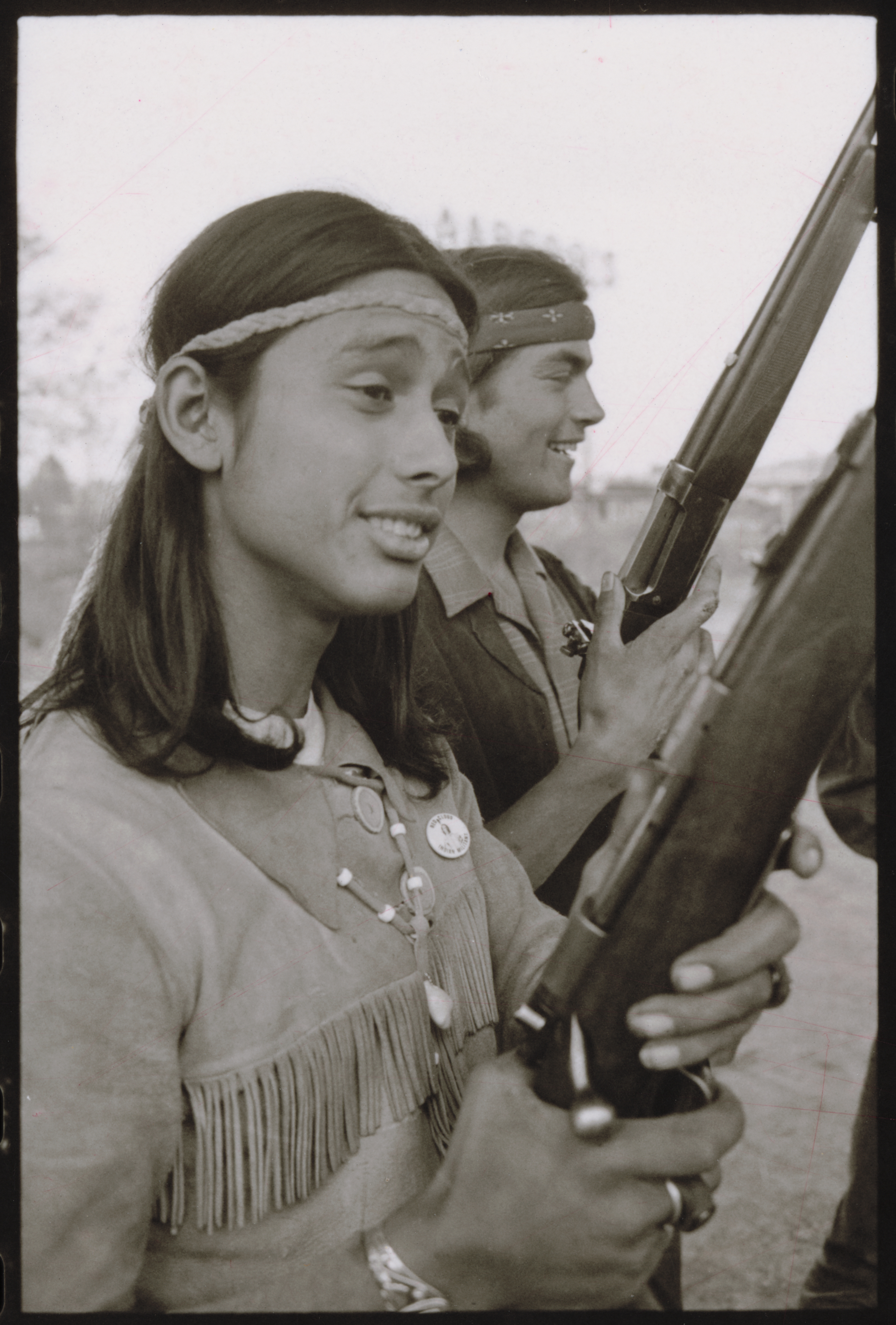
Photograph of American Indians protesting in Washington

The Bureau of Indian Affairs building takeover refers to a major protest led by Native Americans who were members of the American Indian Movement (AIM) at the U.S. Department of the Interior headquarters in Washington, D.C. from November 3 to November 9, 1972. Approximately 500 American Indians activists participated in the take over of 1951 Constitution Avenue, NW, Washington, D.C., the headquarters of the Bureau of Indian Affairs at the time. This was the start of their culmination of their cross-country journey in the Trail of Broken Treaties, their goal was to draw attention to the United States government failure to address the issues facing Native Americans such as living standards and violations of their treaty rights. According to Dana Hedgpeth of The Washington Post, "An estimated 500 to 800 Native Americans took part, taking over the four-story granite headquarters of the BIA. Their siege bore little resemblance to the Jan. 6 riot at the U.S. Capitol. It lasted much longer — six days vs. several hours. And the Indians didn't storm inside but rather walked in and refused to leave".

The protest began with a group of AIM representatives traveling to the Bureau of Indian Affairs (BIA) offices at the national headquarters building, seeking to negotiate with federal officers on improving Indigenous housing and any other related issues. However, after feeling that the government was acting unfairly by rejecting their demand the protesters began the takeover, occupying the building. A federal court soon issued an order for the protesters to vacate the building on the first night of the takeover but they refused to comply.

The AIM affiliated protesters overturned desks and tables to barricade the windows and entrances to defend against a potential police attack. Some set fires in interior offices and the marble lobbies, destroying many historic documents. Protestors were starting to run low of supplies after several days. They refused to allow law enforcement or any other government official to enter the building, instead they had two children from BIA employees bring over some supplies. After a week of occupation, the protesters left, with some taking BIA documents with them, and having caused an estimated $700,000 in damages. With the loss of the documents, the Washington Post claimed that the destruction and theft of records could set the Bureau of Indian Affairs back 50 to 100 years.

Then President Richard Nixon had an interest in promoting tribal sovereignty, as having ended the termination of tribes that was part of 1950s policy. Alongside his interest in the decentralization of government, Nixon fundamentally agreed that tribes should manage their operations. As a result of the AIM occupation of the BIA's offices, Nixon signed the Menominee Restoration Act to restore one tribe to federally recognized status and supported legislation that offered tribes control over their own operations and programs.

== Preparation ==
AIM members had done research and organized to prepare for their 1972 cross-country journey and anticipated negotiating with the federal government. They researched, organized, and prepared in 1972 after the brief BIA takeover in 1971. Understanding the law was essential to bringing the claims of Indian tribes and the urban populations forward to policy makers and the courts. Volunteer attorneys and other scholars who had studied the laws, executive orders, and BIA budgeting and practices to inform the AIM agenda of exposing government misdirection and illegal practice.

These Indians were concerned about the lands they had lost through treaties, speculation, and corruption. They struggled to make lives on the small areas of reservations, often isolated from population centers. According to History, "Its leaders took inspiration from the civil rights movement and the policies of nonviolent confrontation that many of its leaders espoused, although as the years went on AIM members would occasionally take up arms.". The Native Americans wanted to protest peacefully and nonviolent, all they wanted was to be heard and be treated better with fair rights as everyone else.

Momentum and support grew for the AIM among younger Native Americans and First Nations peoples. Unlike in 1971, the groups were prepared and focused on their target. Sympathetic groups that joined the planning included the National Indian Brotherhood of Canada, Native American Rights Fund, National Indian Youth Council, National American Indian Council, National Council on Indian Work, National Indian Leadership Training, and American Indian Committee on Alcohol and Drug Abuse. Others who endorsed the effort included the Native American Women’s Action Council, United Native Americans, National Indian Lutheran Board, Coalition of Indian-Controlled School Boards, and the Black Panther Party for Self Defense.

== Occupation ==
Indians from around the country gathered into groups and converged on the Interior building on November 2, 1972, and stayed there for six-seven days. As Richard Nixon celebrated a landslide presidential victory on November 7, AIM’s 'Twenty Points' position paper was presented to him. It reminded Nixon how unprepared he was to deal with Indian issues across the country and how he had failed in his effort to quell Indian pressures for reforms.

The Twenty Points position paper established Native American goals for their relations with the federal government. Twelve of the twenty points directly or indirectly address treaty responsibility in which the U.S. had fallen short.

1. Restoration of treaty making (ended by Congress in 1871).
2. Establishment of a treaty commission to make new treaties (with sovereign Native Nations).
3. Indian leaders to be permitted to address Congress.
4. Review of treaty commitments and violations.
5. Unratified treaties to go heard by the Senate for action.
6. All Indians to be governed by treaty relations.
7. Relief for Native Nations for treaty rights violations.
8. Recognition of the right of Indians to interpret treaties.
9. Joint Congressional Committee to be formed on reconstruction of Indian relations.
10. Restoration of 110 million acres (450,000 km^{2}) of land taken away from Native Nations by the United States.
11. Restoration of terminated rights.
12. Repeal of state jurisdiction on Native Nations.
13. Federal protection for offenses against Indians.
14. Abolition of the Bureau of Indian Affairs.
15. Creation of a new office of Federal Indian Relations.
16. New office to remedy breakdown in the constitutionally prescribed relationships between the United States and Native Nations.
17. Native Nations to be immune to commerce regulation, taxes, trade restrictions of states.
18. Indian religious freedom and cultural integrity protected.
19. Establishment of national Indian voting with local options; free national Indian organizations from governmental controls
20. Reclaim and affirm health, housing, employment, economic development, and education for all Indian people.

According to the Washington Post, during the occupation, Native Americans spent days in the building going through—and taking—files that raised questions about unfair deals on land, water, fishing and mineral rights. Others took artifacts, pottery and artwork that they said belonged to tribes.

== Presidential reaction ==
As AIM activists were in the process of occupying the BIA building in Washington, D.C., representatives of the Nixon administration were meeting with tribal chairmen in a scheduled meeting at the other end of the country in rural Oregon. A new organization was established, called The National Tribal Chairman’s Association. The NTCA was presumably an outgrowth of the National Congress of American Indians, founded in 1944. Nixon promised the support of the federal government for "federally recognized" tribes. This excluded groups that had not been recognized, including tribes whose federal status had been terminated in the 1950s under federal policy of the time, which believed that some tribes were "ready" to assimilate into the mainstream.

The NTCA was given offices within the National Council on Indian Opportunity. Tribal chairmen discussed common issues, including how to manage limited resources. Some believed that "urban Indians", those members who had left the reservations to live elsewhere, should be excluded from tribal benefits, although such members often struggled economically even in cities.

When the AIM Protestors left the Interior building on November 8, the White House had agreed to discuss all 20 points except amnesty, which was to be addressed separately. From which an "interagency task force" was created, to be co-chaired by representatives of the White House and to include dozens of Indian organizations. The occupiers then agreed to leave the building with the assurance that the White House would examine eligibility of Indians for governmental services; adequacy of governmental service delivery; quality, speed, and effectiveness of federal programs; Indian self-government; and congressional implementation of necessary Indian legislation.

President Nixon had a different opinion, compared to the 1950s emphasis on termination of tribes and their governments, which stood in line with ideas about decentralization of government. Nixon believed that tribes likely could do better than a distant government agency in managing affairs of their people and serving them. On December 22, 1973, Nixon privately signed the Menominee Restoration Act, which returned Menominee Indians to full federally recognized tribal status, returning their land assets to trust status. According to History.com Nixon, "offered the broadest and most sustained commitment to supporting Native people, signing more than 50 legislative measures supporting American Indian sovereignty". Nixon might have played more of a leadership role in these issues but was later caught up in the Watergate scandal and resigned the next year on August 9, 1974.

Since the 1971 protest, many terminated tribes have regained recognition through Congressional legislation. Other tribes have been recognized either through direct legislative action or an official process created by the BIA after speaking with tribal officials.

== Depiction in popular culture ==
This event is described in the 1990 memoir Lakota Woman by Mary Crow Dog.
