= Where White Men Fear to Tread =

1995 autobiography of Russell Means

Where White Men Fear to Tread: The Autobiography of Russell Means
- Author: Russell Means; Marvin J. Wolf
- Language: English
- Genre: Autobiography
- Published: 1995
- Publisher: St. Martin's Press
- Publication place: United States
- Pages: 573 pp
- ISBN: 9780312147617

Where White Men Fear to Tread: The Autobiography of Russell Means is the autobiography of Oglala Lakota activist Russell Means. Published in 1995 and written in collaboration with Marvin J. Wolf, the book examines his childhood, his activism for the rights of Native Americans, including his role in the famous standoff with the FBI at Wounded Knee in 1973, and his later forays into politics, film and television.

== Reception ==
The book received mixed reviews. Publishers Weekly called the book a blunt and "absorbing epic" which demonstrates his "resourceful activism", while making no attempt to whitewash the messier aspects of Means' life, such as his drinking, failed marriages, and anger issues.

The Los Angeles Times called it a self-congratulatory "exercise in propaganda and polemic" which grinds an axe against a white-dominated society.

The New York Times wrote, "Mr. Means plays so much at being the warrior king that the commoners among us are turned off and shut out."
