= Lakota Woman =

Autobiographal book by Mary Brave Bird

- Lakota Woman
- Author: Mary Crow Dog, Richard Erdoes
- Original title: Lakota Woman
- Cover artist: David Zimet/Robert Anthony, Inc.
- Language: English
- Subject: American Indian Movement
- Genre: Autobiography
- Publisher: Grove Weidenfeld
- Publication date: 1990
- Publication place: United States
- Media type: Print (Hardcover)
- Pages: 263
- ISBN: 3-423-36104-2
- Followed by: Ohitika Woman

Lakota Woman is a memoir by Mary Brave Bird, a Sicangu Lakota who was formerly known as Mary Crow Dog. Reared on the Rosebud Indian Reservation in South Dakota, she describes her childhood and young adulthood, which included many historical events associated with the American Indian Movement.

Lakota Woman describes Brave Bird's participation in the 1972 Trail of Broken Treaties and the 1973 Indian Occupation at Wounded Knee. She also writes about her marriage to Leonard Crow Dog, the spiritual leader of AIM. She describes her involvement in the Native American Church.

Richard Erdoes (1912-2008) edited the book. Born in Austria and author of over 21 books, Erdoes was a longtime friend of Brave Bird and also helped her publish her other memoir, Ohitika Woman.

== Honors ==
Lakota Woman won the 1991 American Book Award.

The book inspired the 1994 film Lakota Woman: Siege at Wounded Knee produced by TNT and Jane Fonda. It starred Irene Bedard who would also later provide the speaking voice of Pocahontas in the 1995 Disney animation Pocahontas.
