= Richard Erdoes =

American historian

- Born: July 7, 1912; Frankfurt, German Empire
- Died: July 16, 2008 (aged 96); Santa Fe, New Mexico, U.S.
- Occupations: Artist, writer, photographer, editor, illustrator

Richard Erdoes (Hungarian Erdős, German Erdös; July 7, 1912 – July 16, 2008) was an American artist, photographer, illustrator and author.

== Early life ==
Erdoes was born in Frankfurt, to Maria Josefa Schrom on July 7, 1912. His father, Richárd Erdős Sr., was a Jewish Hungarian opera singer who had died a few weeks earlier in Budapest on June 9, 1912. After his birth, his mother lived with her sister, the Viennese actress Leopoldine ("Poldi") Sangora, He described himself as "equal parts Austrian, Hungarian and German, as well as equal parts Catholic, Protestant and Jew..."

== Career ==
He was a student at the Berlin Academy of Art in 1933, when Adolf Hitler came to power. He was involved in a small underground paper where he published anti-Hitler political cartoons which attracted the attention of the Nazi regime. He fled Germany with a price on his head. Back in Vienna, he continued his training at the Kunstgewerbeschule, now the University of Applied Arts, Vienna. He also wrote and illustrated children's books and worked as a caricaturist for Tag and Stunde, anti-Nazi newspapers. After the Anschluss of Austria in 1938 he fled again, first to Paris, where he studied at the Academie de la Grande Chaumiere, and then London, England before journeying to the United States. He married his first wife, fellow artist Elsie Schulhof (d. xxxx) in London, shortly before their arrival in New York City.

In New York City, Erdoes enjoyed a long career as a commercial artist, and was known for his highly detailed, whimsical drawings. He created illustrations for such magazines as Stage, Fortune, Pageant, Gourmet, Harper's Bazaar, Sports Illustrated, The New York Times, Time, National Geographic and Life Magazine, where he met his second wife, Jean Sternbergh (d. 1995) who was an art director there. The couple married in 1951 and had three children. Erdoes also illustrated many children's books.

An assignment for Life in 1967 took Erdoes to the Pine Ridge Indian Reservation for the first time, and marked the beginning of the work for which he would be best known. Erdoes was fascinated by Native American culture, outraged at the conditions on the reservation and deeply moved by the Civil Rights Movement that was raging at the time. He wrote histories, collections of Native American stories and myths, and wrote about such voices of the Native American Renaissance as Leonard and Mary Crow Dog and John Fire Lame Deer. The Erdoes' New York City apartment was a well known hub of the American Indian Movement (AIM) in the early 1970s and he became involved in the legal defense of several AIM members. In 1975 the family moved to Santa Fe, New Mexico where Erdoes continued to write and remained active in the movement for Native American civil rights.

His papers are preserved at the Beinecke Rare Book and Manuscript Library at Yale University.

== Works ==
As author:

- Peddlers and Vendors Around the World (1967) OCLC 469694
- Policemen Around the World (1967) OCLC 268889
- Musicians Around the World (1971) ISBN 9780070195646
- The Sun Dance People: The Plains Indians, Their Past and Present (1972) ISBN 9780394923161, 9780394823164, 9780394708034
- The Rain Dance People: The Pueblo Indians, Their Past and Present (1976) ISBN 9780394823942, 9780394923949
- The Woman Who Dared (1978) ISBN 9780449139752
- Saloons of the Old West (1979) ISBN 9780517181737
- The Native Americans: Navajos (1979) ISBN 9780806927404
- Native Americans: The Sioux (1982) ISBN 9780806927428, 9780806927435
- Native Americans: The Pueblos (1983) ISBN 9780806927442, 9780806927459
- The Richard Erdoes Illustrated Treasury of Classic Unlaundered Limericks (1984) ISBN 9780917439018
- A.D. 1000: Living on the Brink of Apocalypse (1988) ISBN 9780062502957
- Crying for a Dream: The World through Native American Eyes (1990) ISBN 9780939680573
- Tales from the American Frontier (1992) ISSN 0362-8930
- Legends and Tales of the American West (1998) ISBN 9780375702662

As illustrator:

- The Cat and The Devil (1964) by James Joyce OCLC 168545
- Come over to My House (1966) by Theo. LeSieg (pen name of Theo Geisel aka Dr. Seuss) ISBN 9780001713130, 9780001711297
- The Spotted Stones (1978) by Silvio Bedini ISBN 9780394835730, 9780394935737

As editor, collector or collaborator:

- Lame Deer, Seeker of Visions (1972), with John Fire Lame Deer ISBN 9780671211974
- The Sound of Flutes and Other Indian Legends (1976), with John Fire Lame Deer ISBN 9780394831817, 9780394931814
- American Indian Myths and Legends (1984), with Alfonso Ortiz ISBN 9780394507965, 9781564310293
- Lakota Woman (1991) by Mary Crow Dog ISBN 9780060973896
- Crow Dog, Leonard; Erdoes, Richard (1995). Crow Dog: Four Generations of Sioux Medicine Men. HarperCollins Publishers. ISBN 978-0-06-016861-2.
- American Indian Trickster Tales (1999), with Alfonso Ortiz ISBN 9780140277715
- Ojibwa Warrior: Dennis Banks and the Rise of the American Indian Movement (2005), with Dennis Banks ISBN 9780806135809
- Ohitika Woman (2009), with Mary Brave Bird ISBN 9780802191564

== Honors and awards ==
- American Institute of Graphic Arts
- Viennese Museum of Applied Arts
- Art Directors Club of New York
- Society of Illustrators
- American Book Award, Before Columbus Foundation (1991) - for Lakota Woman
- Austrian Cross of Honour for Science and Art (1999)
