= Richárd Erdős =

Jewish Hungarian bass opera singer (1881–1912)

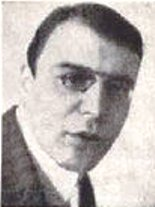
Richárd Erdős

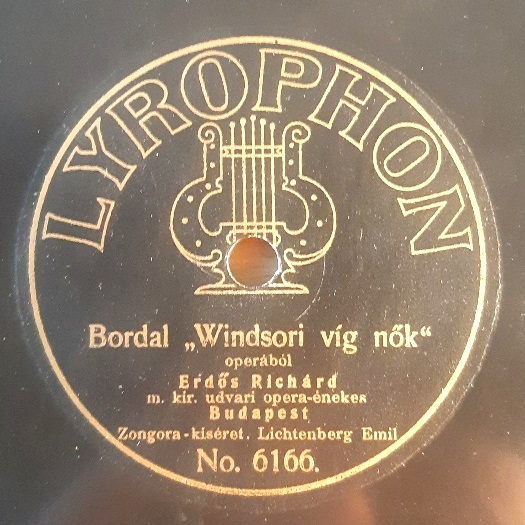
Drinking Song from Nicolai's The Merry Wives of Windsor, 1905 recording

Richárd Erdős (Brno, 18 May 1881 – 9 June 1912, Frankfurt) was a Jewish Hungarian bass opera singer who was father of the American children's author Richard Erdoes.

== Historical recordings ==
- Stars of Hungarian Opera, vol. 1, Hungaroton
