= Guardians of the Oglala Nation =

Paramilitary organizations based in the United States

- Flag of the Pine Ridge Indian Reservation
- Active: 1972–1976
- Disbanded: Yes
- Country: Pine Ridge Indian Reservation, United States
- Size: ~60 militants
- Nickname: GOONs
- Engagements: Wounded Knee Occupation

The Guardians of the Oglala Nation (GOON) was an American paramilitary group established in 1972 by Oglala tribal chairman Dick Wilson under authority of the Oglala Sioux Tribal Council. It operated on the Pine Ridge Indian Reservation during the early 1970s, and was disbanded after a new chairman was elected in 1976.

== Formation ==
On November 10, 1972, the Oglala Sioux Tribal Council passed several resolutions following the Bureau of Indian Affairs building takeover in Washington, DC by members of the American Indian Movement (AIM), after their march across the US. One resolution criticized AIM for the destruction of records during the building takeover, as this adversely affected many Native American tribes by the loss of land, leasing, and other financial records. Another resolution authorized the elected tribal president, Dick Wilson, "to take whatever action that he felt would be necessary to protect the lives and property and to insure the peace and dignity of the Pine Ridge Indian Reservation" of the Oglala Sioux.

Wilson soon used this authority to create a new private police force, which critics called "the goon squad", from its acronym. Although both "goon" and "goon squad" were both terms used in the United States to describe hired thugs, mercenaries, or employees of security companies since at least the 1930s, it is unknown if the organization's name is an intentional backronym. The GOONs were financed through the tribal government. In his 1991 book about the tribe and reservation, author Peter Matthiessen alleges that funding was derived through misappropriation of a federal highway safety program. GOONs soon were accused of intimidation of, and violence against, Wilson's political opponents.

== Role during the Wounded Knee Incident ==
On February 27, 1973, local Oglala protesters and AIM activists seized the village of Wounded Knee, South Dakota, in an armed protest of their failed effort to dislodge Wilson from office. A 71-day standoff with law enforcement commenced, and ultimately federal forces were sent to the reservation, as federal law enforcement has jurisdiction over most criminal matters. During the standoff, GOONs exchanged gunfire with the occupiers. GOONs also placed their own roadblocks. The FBI also closely collaborated with and supported the local tribal chairperson, and his vigilantes. Wilson was notorious for his corruption and abuse of power on the reservation.

== After Wounded Knee ==
A reconciliation between Federal law enforcement and opposition leaders was reached in 1973. But fighting between GOONs and AIM militants on the reservation continued after Wounded Knee. AIM claimed that during the next three years, more than sixty persons died violently on the reservation. This number has been contested by Tim Giago, editor and publisher at the time of Indian Country Today. GOONs were accused of assault, murder, and arson. GOON activities during the 1974 tribal election led the United States Civil Rights Commission to report "a climate of fear and tension". Wilson stayed in office and in 1974 was re-elected amid charges of intimidation, voter fraud, and other abuses. The rate of violence climbed on the reservation as conflict opened between political factions in the following three years; residents accused Wilson's private militia, Guardians of the Oglala Nation (GOONs), of much of it. More than 60 opponents of the tribal government allegedly died violently during those years, including Pedro Bissonette, director of the Oglala Sioux Civil Rights Organization (OSCRO). In 2000, the FBI released a report regarding these alleged unsolved violent deaths during this time on Pine Ridge Reservation and accounted for most of the deaths, and disputed the claims of unsolved and political murders. The report stated that only 4 deaths were unsolved and that some deaths were not murders.

Al Trimble was elected and succeeded Wilson as tribal president in 1976. He had listed disbanding the GOONs as the first order of business. Upon taking office he cut off all funding for the GOONs, and the militia faded away shortly afterward.

== References in popular culture ==
GOONs are portrayed in the 1992 film Thunderheart, which was partially based on historic events.

The GOONs were briefly covered in the documentary A Good Day to Die and the biopic Lakota Woman: Siege at Wounded Knee.
