= Irene Bedard =

Native American actress (born 1967)

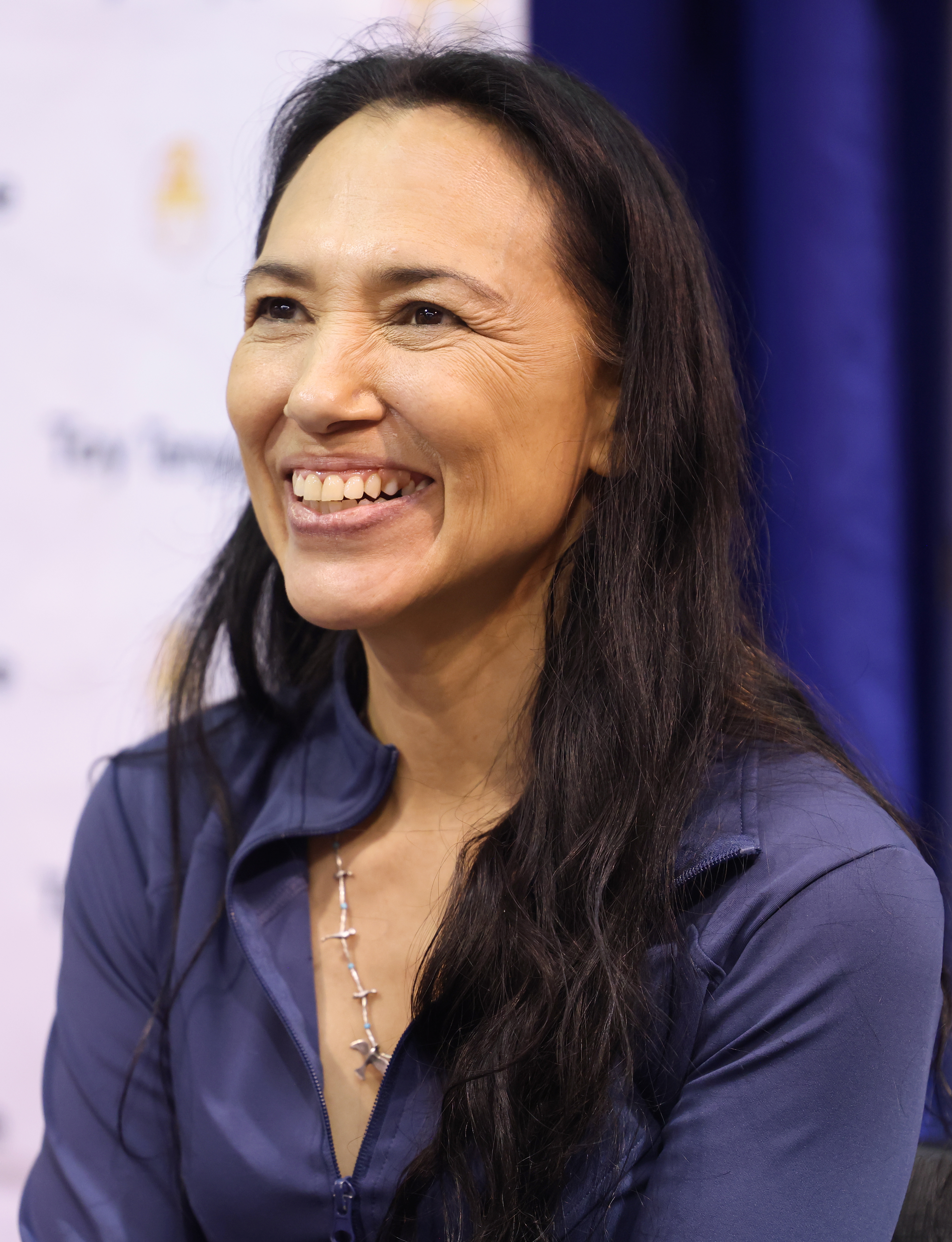
- Bedard in 2026
- Born: July 22, 1967 (age 59); Anchorage, Alaska, U.S.
- Occupation: Actress
- Years active: 1994–present
- Spouse: Denny Wilson (m. 1993; div. 2012)
- Children: 1

Irene Bedard (born July 22, 1967) is an American actress, who has played mostly Native American lead roles in a variety of films. She is perhaps best known for the role of Suzy Song in the 1998 film Smoke Signals, an adaptation of a Sherman Alexie collection of short stories, as well as for providing the speaking voice for the titular character in the 1995 animated film Pocahontas. Bedard reprised her role as Pocahontas in the film's direct-to-video follow-up, Pocahontas II: Journey to a New World (1998) and for a cameo in Ralph Breaks the Internet (2018).

== Early life ==
Bedard was born in Anchorage, Alaska, to a Native Alaskan mother of Iñupiaq and Yup’ik descent, and a Canadian father of Cree, and French descent. She is an enrolled citizen of the Native American Village of Koyuk in Alaska.

== Career ==
In 1994, Bedard appeared in her first role as Mary Crow Dog in the television production of Lakota Woman: Siege at Wounded Knee, which depicted the 1970s standoff between the US government and citizens of several Native nations, including many of the Pine Ridge Reservation, at Wounded Knee, South Dakota. For this role, she was nominated for a Golden Globe Award for Best Actress in a Miniseries or Television Film. As such, in 1994 she became the first Native American woman to receive an acting award nomination from the Golden Globe Awards.

Bedard is known as the voice of the eponymous heroine in the 1995 Disney animated film Pocahontas, the direct-to-video 1998 sequel Pocahontas II: Journey to a New World and in the 2018 film Ralph Breaks the Internet. She appeared in a different take of the story in Terrence Malick's 2005 film The New World, as Pocahontas's mother, Nonoma Winanuske Matatiske.

In 1995, Bedard was chosen as one of People magazine's "50 Most Beautiful People".

In 2001, Irene Bedard hosted the Ninth Annual First Americans in the Arts (FAITA) Awards from the Beverly Hilton Hotel. In 2002, at the Tenth Annual FAITA Awards, Bedard won Outstanding Guest Performance by an Actress in a TV Drama Series for The Agency.

In 2005, she was cast in the television mini-series Into the West as Margaret "Light Shines" Wheeler. Bedard has been very active in environmental groups to protect sacred lands. In 1997, Bedard and Floyd Westerman co-hosted a benefit for the Dine' People of Big Mountain at The Loft Theatre, in Pasadena. In 2015, she appeared in Chloé Zhao's debut feature film, Songs My Brothers Taught Me. In 2016, Bedard announced an agreement with the Catawba Nation of South Carolina to join in a production agreement. In 2017, she appeared as a recurring character in the TV series The Mist. Bedard made an appearance in the music video for Jay-Z's 2017 song "Family Feud", in which she plays a future Madam President of the United States.

In 2020, Bedard played a recurring character in the drama series FBI: Most Wanted. She then was a starring cast member in the Paramount+ miniseries The Stand, as Ray Brentner, a gender-swapped version of Ralph Brentner from the 1994 adaptation.

In 2022, she was cast as Yagoda in the Netflix series Avatar: The Last Airbender and as Sylvie Nanmac in Alaska Daily, the mother of a missing indigenous woman. She also appeared in the film How to Blow Up a Pipeline.

== Personal life ==
In 1993, Bedard married musician Denny Wilson, together, they have a son. Between her films, the pair toured for several years with other musicians in a band called "ID," which came from the initials of their first names, Irene and Denny. In 2012, the couple divorced following Bedard's allegations of Wilson abusing her. Wilson, however, denied all these accusations.

=== Legal issues ===
In 2020, Bedard was arrested twice in three days. The first arrest was for alleged domestic violence, assault, disorderly conduct, resisting arrest, and criminal damaging; the second was for alleged disorderly conduct. In August 2022, she was again arrested for disorderly conduct in Xenia, Ohio.

== Filmography ==
=== Film ===
| Year | Title | Role | Notes |
|---|---|---|---|
| 1994 | Squanto: A Warrior's Tale | Nakooma | |
| 1995 | Pocahontas | Pocahontas (voice) | |
| 1996 | Navajo Blues | Audrey Wyako | |
| 1997 | Song of Hiawatha | Minnehaha | |
| 1997 | Det store flip | Oglala | AKA, Wild Flowers |
| 1998 | Two for Texas | Sana | |
| 1998 | 6/29 | Laura Cooper | |
| 1998 | Naturally Native | Tanya Lewis | |
| 1998 | Smoke Signals | Suzy Song | |
| 1998 | Pocahontas II: Journey to a New World | Pocahontas (voice) | Direct-to-video |
| 1998 | 12 Bucks | Babe | |
| 1999 | Wildflowers | Ruby | |
| 2000 | Pussykat | | Un-produced |
| 2001 | Your Guardian | Katherine 'Kat' Damon | |
| 2003 | Paris | Sandy | |
| 2003 | Greasewood Flat | Abbey | |
| 2003 | Edge of America | Annie Shorty | Television film |
| 2005 | Planting Melvin | Billie Lawrence | |
| 2005 | Miracle at Sage Creek | Sunny | |
| 2005 | Love's Long Journey | Miriam Red Hawk McClain | Television film |
| 2005 | The New World | Pocahontas's Mother (Nonoma) | |
| 2007 | Cosmic Radio | K.C. | |
| 2007 | Tortilla Heaven | Liberata | |
| 2007 | The Red Chalk | Eve | Short film |
| 2008 | Turok: Son of Stone | Catori (voice) | Direct-to-video |
| 2011 | The Tree of Life | Messenger | |
| 2013 | Vertical | Lucy Mills | |
| 2014 | Ron and Laura Take Back America | Mrs. Alma | |
| 2015 | Songs My Brothers Taught Me | Lisa Winters | |
| 2017 | Spreading Darkness | Marci Gippolin | |
| 2018 | Ralph Breaks the Internet | Pocahontas (voice) | |
| 2019 | The Bygone | Mrs. Call | |
| 2022 | The Harbinger | Floating Hawk | Also executive producer |
| 2022 | How to Blow Up a Pipeline | Joanna | |
| 2022 | Mending the Line | Mrs. Redcloud | |
| 2022 | The Redeemer | Aponi Nelson | |
| 2023 | On Sacred Ground | Mary Singing Crow | |
| 2023 | Hey, Viktor! | Irene | |
| 2024 | The Heart Stays | Aunt Celia | |
| 2025 | The Last Rodeo | Agisa Williams | |

=== Television ===
| Year | Title | Role | Notes |
|---|---|---|---|
| 1994 | Lakota Woman: Siege at Wounded Knee | Mary Crow Dog | Television film |
| 1995 | The Marshal | Melissa Carey | Episode: "Twoslip" |
| 1996 | Grand Avenue | Reyna | Television film |
| 1996 | Crazy Horse | Black Buffalo Woman | Television film |
| 1996 | Adventures from the Book of Virtues | Morning Light, Sharp Eyes (voice) | 2 episodes |
| 1996 | The Real Adventures of Jonny Quest | Alice Starseer, additional voices | 2 episodes |
| 1997 | Profiler | Maddy Duvall | Episode: "The Sorcerer's Apprentice" |
| 1997 | True Women | Tobe | Television film |
| 1998 | Two for Texas | Sana | Television film |
| 1999 | Pepper Ann | Carol (voice) | Episode: "Dances with Ignorance/Girl Power" |
| 1999 | Blood Money | Naomi Lister | Television film |
| 1999–2001 | Roughnecks: Starship Troopers Chronicles | Miriam Redwing (voice) | 4 episodes |
| 2000 | The Lost Child | Grace | Television film |
| 2001 | The Outer Limits | Callie Whitehorse Landau | Episode: "In the Blood" |
| 2001 | The Agency | Diah Siagian | Episode: "The Year of Living Dangerously" |
| 2001 | House of Mouse | Pocahontas (voice) | Episode: "Thanks to Minnie" |
| 2004 | What's New, Scooby-Doo? | Cody Long (voice) | Episode: "New Mexico, Old Monster" |
| 2005 | Higglytown Heroes | Forest Ranger Hero (voice) | Episode: "Fran Takes a Hike" |
| 2005 | Into the West | Margaret Light Shines | 3 episodes |
| 2008–2009 | The Spectacular Spider-Man | Jean DeWolff (voice) | 4 episodes |
| 2012 | Young Justice | Shelly Longshadow (voice) | Episode: "Beneath" |
| 2012–2015 | Longmire | May Stillwater | 3 episodes |
| 2017 | The Mist | Kimi Lucero | 9 episodes |
| 2017 | Scalped | Gina Bad Horse | Pilot |
| 2018 | Westworld | Wichapi | Episode: "Kiksuya" |
| 2020 | FBI: Most Wanted | Mary Lou Skye | 8 episodes |
| 2020–2021 | The Stand | Ray Brentner | Television miniseries |
| 2022–2023 | Alaska Daily | Sylvie Nanmac | 6 episodes |
| 2024 | Avatar: The Last Airbender | Yagoda | 2 episodes |
| 2024 | The Green Veil | Glennie Sutton | 4 episodes |
| 2025 | American Primeval | Winter Bird | 5 episodes |

=== Music video ===
| Year | Title | Artist(s) | Role |
|---|---|---|---|
| 2017 | "Family Feud" | Jay-Z featuring Beyoncé | Madam President |

=== Video games ===
| Year | Title | Role |
|---|---|---|
| 1995 | Animated Storybook: Pocahontas | Pocahontas |
| 1996 | Disney's Pocahontas | Pocahontas |
| 2021 | Cookie Run: Kingdom | Pocahontas Cookie |
| 2026 | Disney Dreamlight Valley | Pocahontas |
| TBA | Disney Speedstorm | Pocahontas |

== Awards and nominations ==
| Year | Award | Category | Film | Result |
|---|---|---|---|---|
| 1995 | Golden Globe | Best Performance by an Actress in a Mini-Series or Motion Picture Made for TV | Lakota Woman: Siege at Wounded Knee | Nominated |
| 1999 | Western Heritage Awards | Bronze Wrangler - Television Feature Film | Two for Texas | Won |
| 2004 | First Americans in the Arts Awards | Best Lead Actress in a Feature Film | Greasewood Flat | Won |
| 2002 | First Americans in the Arts Awards | Outstanding Guest Performance by an Actress in a TV Drama Series | The Agency | Won |
| 2006 | NAMIC Vision Awards | Best Dramatic Performance | Into the West | Won |
| 2006 | Western Heritage Awards | Bronze Wrangler - Television Feature Film | Into the West | Won |
