= Two for Texas =

1998 TV film

- Television release poster
- Based on: Two for Texas by James Lee Burke
- Screenplay by: Larry Brothers
- Directed by: Rod Hardy
- Starring: Kris Kristofferson; Scott Bairstow; Irene Bedard; Tom Skerritt; Peter Coyote; Victor Rivers
- Composer: Lee Holdridge
- Country of origin: United States
- Original language: English

Production
- Producer: Dennis Bishop
- Cinematography: David Connell
- Editor: Michael D. Ornstein
- Running time: 96 minutes
- Production company: Bleecker Street Films

Original release
- Network: TNT
- Release: January 18, 1998

Two for Texas is a 1998 American Western television film directed by Rod Hardy, written by Larry Brothers, and starring Kris Kristofferson, Scott Bairstow, Irene Bedard, Tom Skerritt, Peter Coyote, and Victor Rivers. It is based on the 1982 novel Two for Texas by James Lee Burke. The film premiered on TNT on January 18, 1998.

== Plot ==
In 1836, two prisoners escape from a Louisiana chain gang run by a vicious strong boss. In the process of the escape, the strong boss is killed which sets his brother, the ex-warden on a chase of the men. However, the two join up with Sam Houston's army to fight the Mexicans which also sets them free from previous charges. The ex-warden then sells guns to the Mexicans which leads to the Alamo massacre and the death of their friend, Jim Bowie. The two then lead the avenging charge at San Jacinto that settles the war.

== Cast ==
- Kris Kristofferson as Hugh Allison
- Scott Bairstow as Son Holland
- Irene Bedard as Sana
- Tom Skerritt as Sam Houston
- Peter Coyote as Jim Bowie
- Victor Rivers as Emile Landry
- Tom Schuster as Alcide Landry
- Rodney A. Grant as Iron Jacket
- Marco Rodríguez as Gen. Santa Anna
- Karey Green as Susannah Dickinson
- Richard Andrew Jones as Deaf Smith
- Richard Nance as Pike
- Lonnie Rodriguez as Sergeant Major
- Julio Cesar Cedillo as Lt. Herrera
- Woody Watson as Lt. Burnett
- Carlos Compean as Capt. Trejo
- Alex Morris as Rex
- James Terry McIlvain as Trusty Luke
- Mark Dalton as Snake Bite Convict
- Larry Brothers as Clay
- Rick Dennis as Mac
- Roy Burger as Matt
- Billy L. 'Butch' Frank as Hank
- Rodger Boyce as Ned
- Daniel O'Callaghan as Jones
- Robert Lott as Kelly
- Stephen Madrid as Mexican Peasant
- Yvette Ancira as Emily Morgan
- Gatlin Boone Smith as Baby Dickinson
