= Menominee Restoration Act =

Act that repealed the Menominee Termination Act of 1954

The Menominee Restoration Act, signed by President of the United States Richard Nixon on December 22, 1973, returned federally recognized sovereignty to the Menominee Indian Tribe of Wisconsin. It also restored tribal supervision over property and members, as well as federal services granted to American Indian tribes. The act officially repealed the Termination Act of 1954. It also called for the creation of the Menominee Restoration Committee, which would be responsible for drafting new tribal constitutions and serve as an interim authority until an officially elected tribal government was put into place. In addition, all Menominee Indians born after the termination of the action would be added to the tribal roll.

Restoration came about as a result of years of poor social and economic conditions that followed the Menominee Termination Act of 1954. Following termination, all Menominee tribal property was transferred to a new corporation, Menominee Enterprises, Inc. (MEI) and the reservation became a new county for Wisconsin: Menominee County. The least populated and poorest county in Wisconsin, Menominee County was unable to fund the taxes needed to support social services such as schools, utilities, and the area hospital. A lumber mill was the area’s main source of employment and it was not able to employ all Menominee. Standards of living and services for Menominee had been significantly lowered and ultimately led to conditions that inspired activism within the community.

Activism began when the Determination of Rights and Unity for Menominee Stockholders (DRUMS) was formed with Jim White and Ada Deer as leaders in the fight against a proposed land development of Legend Lake, a non-Indian owned artificial lake and housing property plan. The selling of land as an economic stimulus to non-Indians was a direct result of poor economic conditions that the Menominee had been living in since termination. After successfully stopping the land development, DRUMS later began the fight to reverse termination and regain status as a federally recognized and sovereign Indian tribe. Originally in opposition to MEI, members of DRUMS eventually gained positions in MEI offices where they began lobbying the United States Congress for Menominee restoration.

The Menominee Restoration Committee headed by Ada Deer was given the responsibility of administering the affairs of the Menominee Tribe on April 23, 1975. In the following year, the tribal roll was reopened, a tribal police force was instituted, law and order codes were written, a public school district was established, control of hunting and fishing rights was restored, and a grant was given by the federal government to build a health clinic. Finally, in 1979, the first nine-member Tribal Legislature was elected under the new Menominee Indian Tribal Constitution.

== See also ==
- Menominee Termination Act of 1954
- Menominee Enterprises, Inc. (MEI)
- Legend Lake
- Determination of Rights and Unity for Menominee Stockholders (DRUMS)
