= Wounded Knee Occupation =

1973 American Indian occupation protest

Coordinates: 43°8′49″N 102°22′20″W

- Part of the Pine Ridge Insurgency, Red Power movement
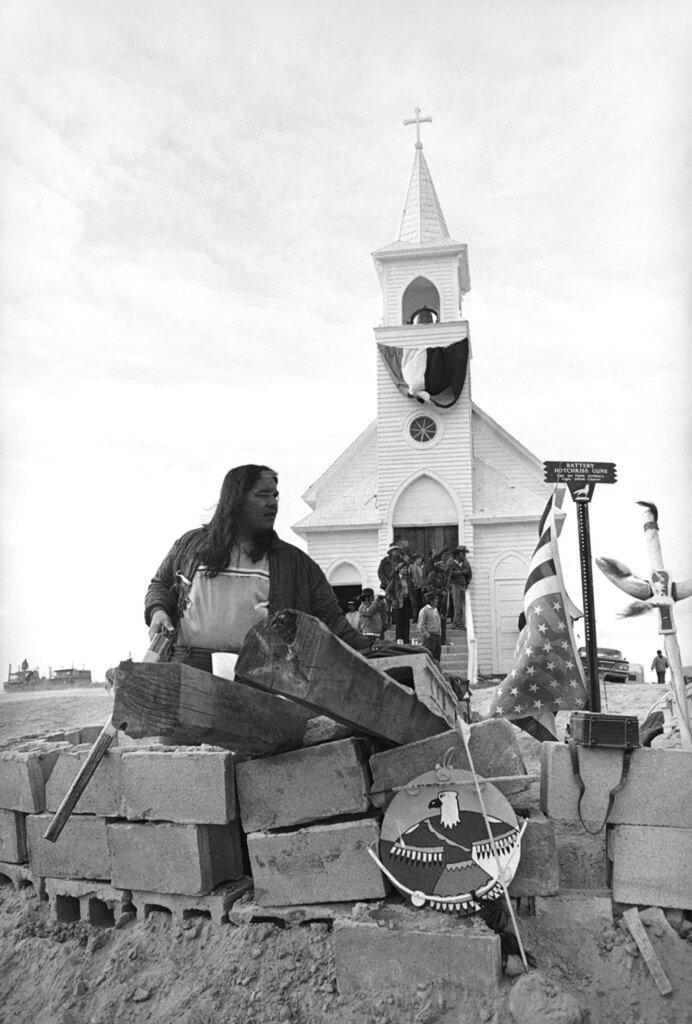
- A member of the American Indian Movement in front of the Wounded Knee church
Date	February 27 – May 8, 1973 (2 months, 1 week and 4 days)
Location	Wounded Knee, South Dakota
Result	American government victory: Occupation ended

Belligerents
American Indian Movement; Oglala dissidents	United States; Oglala government

Commanders and leaders
Frank Fools Crow; Russell Means; Dennis Banks; Carter Camp; Anna Mae Aquash; Wes Studi	Richard M. Nixon; Richard A. Wilson; Wayne B. Colburn; L. Patrick Gray; William Ruckelshaus; (South Dakota) Richard F. Kneip

Units involved
Native American militants	United States; U.S. Marshals; Federal Bureau of Investigation; State of South Dakota; South Dakota National Guard; Oglala Nation; Guardians of the Oglala Nation

Strength
200 (some armed)	Up to a thousand federal agents, national guard maintenance personnel (from 5 states). Helicopters and 15 M113 APCs.

Casualties and losses
3 killed (Frank Clearwater, Buddy Lamont, and Ray Robinson); 14 wounded	2 wounded
- Frank Fools Crow; Russell Means; / Dennis Banks (surrendered); Carter Camp; Anna Mae Aquash; Wes Studi; Ray Robinson X 14 Oglala's wounded and 3 killed (WIA) / (executed)

The Wounded Knee Occupation, also known as Second Wounded Knee, began on February 27, 1973, when approximately 200 Oglala Lakota (sometimes referred to as Oglala Sioux) and followers of the American Indian Movement (AIM) seized and occupied the town of Wounded Knee, South Dakota, United States, on the Pine Ridge Indian Reservation.

The protest followed the failure of an effort of the Oglala Sioux Civil Rights Organization (OSCRO) to use impeachment to remove tribal president Richard Wilson, whom they accused of corruption and abuse of opponents. Protesters also criticized the United States government's failure to fulfill treaties with Native American people, and demanded the reopening of treaty negotiations with the goal of fair and equitable treatment of Native Americans.

Oglala and AIM activists controlled the town for 71 days while the United States Marshals Service, FBI agents, and other law enforcement agencies cordoned off the area. The activists chose the site of the 1890 Wounded Knee Massacre for its symbolic value. In March, a U.S. Marshal was shot by gunfire coming from the town, which ultimately resulted in paralysis. Frank Clearwater (of Eastern Cherokee and Apache nations) was shot and wounded on April 17, dying 8 days later on April 25, 1973, and Lawrence "Buddy" Lamont (Oglala) was shot and killed on April 26, 1973. Ray Robinson, a civil rights activist who joined the protesters, disappeared during the events. It was later determined that he had been buried on the reservation after allegedly being killed during a confrontation with AIM members.

Following Lamont's death the two sides agreed to a truce, which led to the end of the occupation. Remedial steps were part of the negotiated resolution.

The occupation attracted wide media coverage, especially after the press accompanied two U.S. Senators from South Dakota to Wounded Knee. The events electrified Native Americans, and many Native American supporters traveled to Wounded Knee to join the protest. At the time there was widespread public sympathy for the goals of the occupation, as Americans were becoming more aware of longstanding issues of injustice related to Natives. Afterward AIM leaders Dennis Banks and Russell Means were indicted on charges related to the events, but their 1974 case was dismissed by the federal court for prosecutorial misconduct, a decision upheld on appeal.

Wilson stayed in office and in 1974 was re-elected amid charges of intimidation, voter fraud, and other abuses. The rate of violence climbed on the reservation as conflict opened between political factions in the following three years; residents accused Wilson's private militia, Guardians of the Oglala Nation (GOONs), of much of it. According to AIM, there were 64 unsolved murders during these years, including opponents of the tribal government, such as Pedro Bissonette, director of the Oglala Sioux Civil Rights Organization (OSCRO), but this is disputed, with an FBI report in 2000 concluding that there were only four unsolved murders and that many of the deaths listed were not homicides or political.

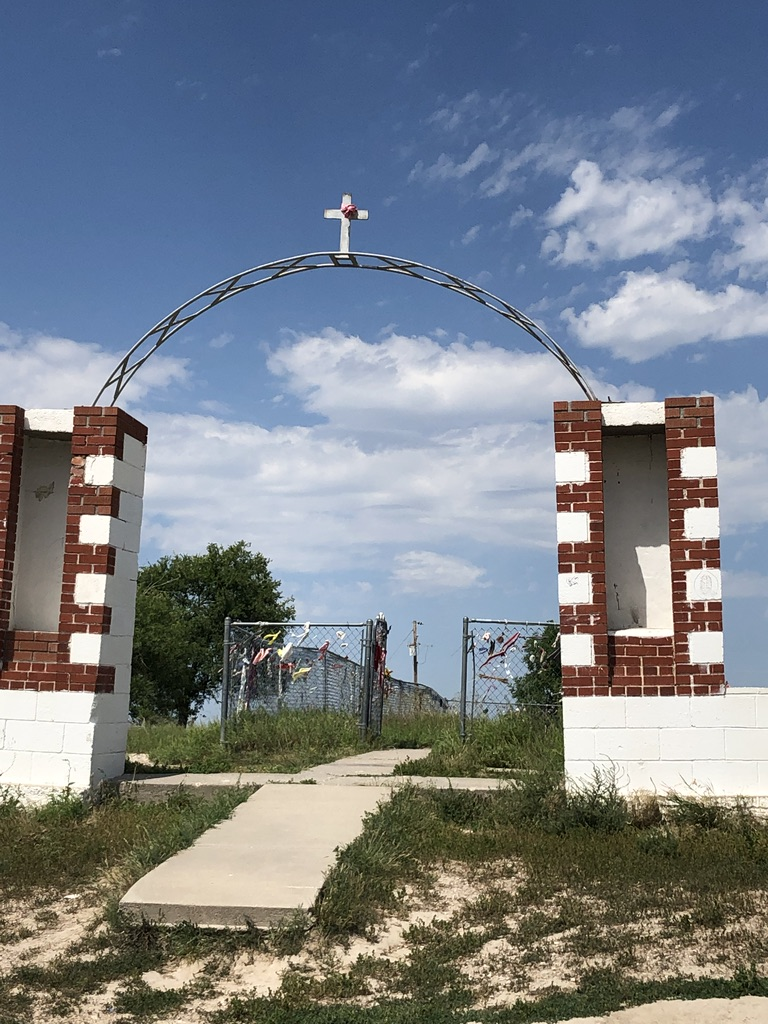
The Archway leading to the Wounded Knee cemetery

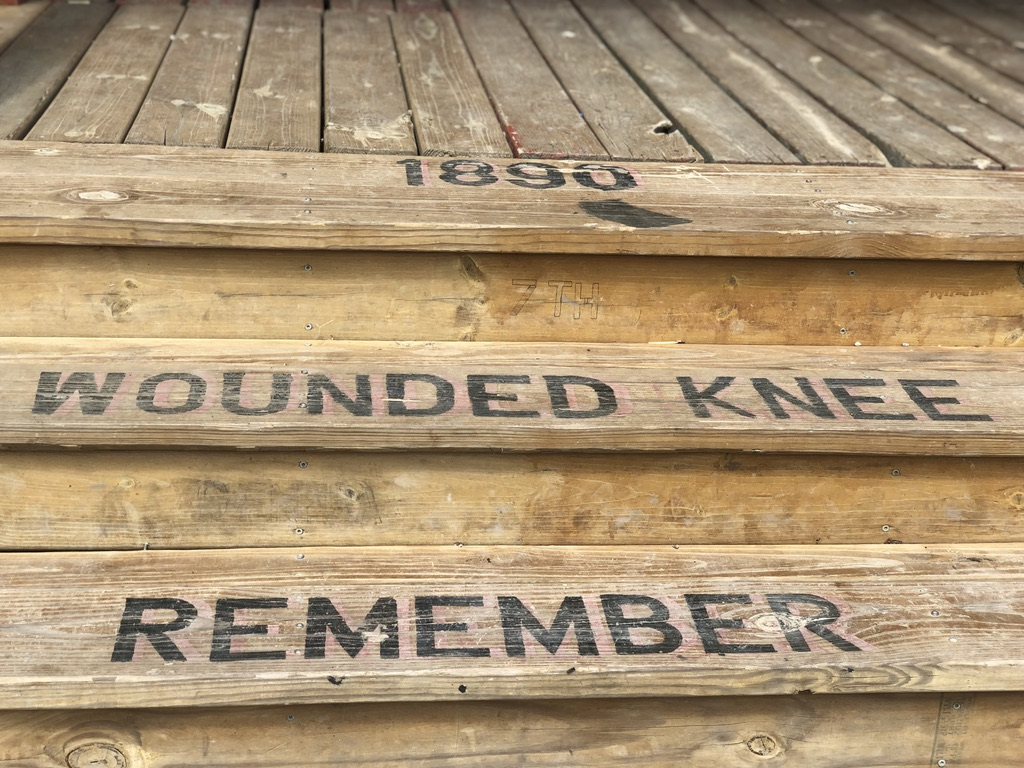
Stairs leading to Wounded Knee church building

== Confrontation ==
=== Background ===
The Indian Relocation Act of 1956 was one law among others through the 1940s and 1950s that are referred to as Indian Termination. It was an effort by the U.S. government to hasten the assimilation of American Indians. Some scholars have characterized the law as an attempt to encourage people to leave Indian reservations for urban areas, which resulted in poverty, joblessness, or homelessness for many in the new urban environment. By 1968, the American Indian Movement (AIM) was founded in urban Minneapolis, Minnesota, and other activist groups were established in cities after termination.

For years, internal tribal tensions had been growing over the difficult conditions on the Pine Ridge Reservation, which has been one of the poorest areas in the United States since it was set up. Many of the tribe believed that Richard Wilson, just elected tribal chairman in 1972, had rapidly become autocratic and corrupt, controlling too much of the employment and other limited opportunities on the reservation. They believed that Wilson favored his family and friends in patronage awards of the limited number of jobs and benefits. Some criticism addressed the mixed-race ancestry of Wilson and his favorites, and suggested they worked too closely with Bureau of Indian Affairs (BIA) officials who still had a hand in reservation affairs. Some full-blood Oglala believed they were not getting fair opportunities.

"Traditionalists" had their own leaders and influence in a parallel stream to the elected government recognized by the United States. The Traditionalists tended to be Oglala who held onto their language and customs, and who did not desire to participate in US federal programs administered by the tribal government.

In his 2007 book on the twentieth-century political history of the Pine Ridge Reservation, historian Akim Reinhardt notes the decades-long ethnic and cultural differences among residents at the reservation. He attributes the Wounded Knee Occupation more to the rising of such internal tensions than to the arrival of AIM, who had been invited to the reservation by OSCRO. He also believes that the Indian Reorganization Act of 1934 did not do enough to reduce U.S. federal government intervention into Sioux and other tribal affairs; he describes the elected tribal governments since the 1930s as a system of "indirect colonialism". Oglala Sioux opposition to such elected governments was long-standing on the reservation; at the same time, the limited two-year tenure of the president's position made it difficult for leaders to achieve much. Officials of the Bureau of Indian Affairs, administrators, and police still had much influence at Pine Ridge and other American Indian reservations, which many tribal members opposed.

Specifically, opponents of Wilson protested his sale of grazing rights on tribal lands to local white ranchers at too low a rate, reducing income to the tribe, whose members held the land communally. They also complained about his land-use decision to lease nearly one-eighth of the reservation's mineral-rich lands to private companies. Some full-blood Lakota complained of having been marginalized since the start of the reservation system. Most did not bother to participate in tribal elections, which led to tensions on all sides. There had been increasing violence on the reservation, which many attributed to Wilson's private militia, Guardians of the Oglala Nation, attacking political opponents to suppress opposition. The so-called "GOONs" were initially funded with $62,000 from the BIA to be "an auxiliary police force".

Another concern was the failure of the justice systems in border towns to prosecute white attacks against Lakota men who went to the towns for their numerous saloons and bars. Alcohol was prohibited on the reservation. Local police seldom prosecuted crimes against the Lakota or charged assailants at lesser levels. Recent murders in border towns heightened concerns on the reservation. An example was the January 27, 1973, murder of 20-year-old Wesley Bad Heart Bull in a bar in Buffalo Gap, South Dakota, which the tribe believed was due to his race. On February 6, AIM led about 200 supporters to a meeting at the courthouse in Custer, South Dakota, where they expected to discuss civil rights issues and wanted charges against the suspect raised to murder from second-degree manslaughter. They were met by riot police, who allowed only five people to enter the courthouse, despite blizzard conditions outside. Reinhardt notes that the confrontation became violent, during which protesters burned down the chamber of commerce building, damaged the courthouse and destroyed two police cars, and vandalized other buildings.

Native American protests had only recently been receiving media attention regarding their civil rights. Preceding the Wounded Knee Occupation was the Occupation of Alcatraz that started November 20, 1969, lasted for two years, and inspired more indigenous activism. The 1972 Trail of Broken Treaties march ended with a six-day AIM-led occupation of the BIA offices in Washington, D.C.

Three weeks before the Wounded Knee Occupation, the tribal council had charged Wilson with several items for an impeachment hearing. However, Wilson was able to avoid a trial, as the prosecution was not ready to proceed immediately, the presiding official would not accept new charges, and the council voted to close the hearings. Charges had been brought by a coalition of local Oglala, grouped loosely around the "traditionalist", the OSCRO, and tribal members of AIM. Wilson opponents were angered that he had evaded impeachment. U.S. Marshals offered him and his family protection at a time of heightened tensions and protected the BIA headquarters at the reservation. Wilson added more fortification to the facility.

=== Occupation ===
After AIM's confrontation at the Custer courthouse, OSCRO leaders asked AIM for help in dealing with Wilson. The traditional chiefs and AIM leaders met with the community to discuss how to deal with the deteriorating situation on the reservation. Women elders such as OSCRO founder Ellen Moves Camp, Gladys Bissonette, and Agnes Lamont urged the men to take action. They decided to make a stand at the hamlet of Wounded Knee, the renowned site of the last large-scale massacre of the American Indian Wars.

On Tuesday, February 27, 1973, about 200 armed AIM members formed a caravan and took over the town at gunpoint, raided the trading post, ransacked the museum and took eleven residents prisoner, including Fr Paul Manhart, the Jesuit priest at Sacred Heart Catholic Church. They announced their demand for the removal of Wilson from office and for immediate revival of treaty talks with the U.S. government. Dennis Banks and Russell Means were prominent spokesmen during the occupation; they often addressed the press, knowing they were making their cause known directly to the American public. The brothers Clyde and Vernon Bellecourt were also AIM leaders at the time, who operated in Minneapolis.

The following day, AIM leaders Russell Means (Oglala) and Carter Camp (Ponca), together with 200 activists and Oglala of the Pine Ridge Indian Reservation, including children and the elderly, occupied the town of Wounded Knee to protest Oglala tribal chairman Richard Wilson's administration, as well as against the federal government's persistent failures to honor its treaties with Native American nations. U.S. government law enforcement, including FBI agents, surrounded Wounded Knee the same day with armed reinforcements. They gradually gained more arms.

==== Disputed facts ====
According to former US Senator for South Dakota James Abourezk, "on February 25, 1973, the U.S. Department of Justice sent out 50 U.S. Marshals to the Pine Ridge Reservation to be available in the case of a civil disturbance." This followed the failed impeachment attempt and meetings of opponents of Wilson. The American Indian Movement says that its organization went to Wounded Knee for an open meeting and "within hours police had set up roadblocks, cordoned off the area and began arresting people leaving town ... the people prepared to defend themselves against the government's aggressions." By the morning of February 28, both sides began to be entrenched.

==== Roadblocks ====
The federal government established roadblocks around the community for 15 miles in every direction. In some areas, Wilson stationed his GOONs outside the federal boundary and required even federal officials to stop for passage.

About ten days into the occupation, the federal government lifted the roadblocks and forced Wilson's people away as well. When the cordon was briefly lifted, many new supporters and activists joined the Oglala at Wounded Knee. Publicity had made the site and action an inspiration to American Indians nationally. On March 8, the leaders declared the territory of Wounded Knee to be the independent Oglala Nation and demanded negotiations with the U.S. Secretary of State, William P. Rogers. The nation granted citizenship to those who wanted it, including non-Indians.

A small delegation, including Frank Fools Crow, the senior elder, and his interpreter, flew to New York to attempt to address and be recognized by the United Nations. While they received international coverage, they did not receive recognition as a sovereign nation by the UN.

John Sayer, a Wounded Knee chronicler, wrote that:

The equipment maintained by the military while in use during the siege included fifteen armored personnel carriers, clothing, rifles, grenade launchers, flares, and 133,000 rounds of ammunition, for a total cost, including the use of maintenance personnel from the National Guard of five states and pilot and planes for aerial photographs, of over half a million dollars.

The data gathered by the historians Record and Hocker supports this: "barricades of paramilitary personnel armed with automatic weapons, snipers, helicopters, armored personnel carriers equipped with .50-caliber machine guns, and more than 130,000 rounds of ammunition". The statistics on the U.S. government force at Wounded Knee vary, but all accounts agree that it was a significant military force including "federal marshals, FBI agents, and armored vehicles". One eyewitness and journalist described "sniper fire from ... federal helicopters", "bullets dancing around in the dirt", and "sounds of shooting all over town" from both sides.

On March 13, Harlington Wood Jr., the assistant attorney general for the Civil Division of the U.S. Justice Department (DOJ), became the first government official to enter Wounded Knee without a military escort. Determined to resolve the deadlock without further bloodshed, he met with AIM leaders for days. While exhaustion made him too ill to conclude the negotiation, he is credited as the "icebreaker" between the government and AIM.

=== Siege ===
After 30 days, the government's tactics became harsher when Kent Frizell was appointed from the DOJ to manage the government's response. He cut off electricity, water, and food supplies to Wounded Knee, when it was still winter in South Dakota, and prohibited the entry of the media. The US government tried starving out the occupants, and AIM activists smuggled food and medical supplies in past roadblocks "set up by Dick Wilson and tacitly supported by the US government". Keefer, a Deputy U.S. Marshal at the scene, said there were no persons between federal agents and the town, and that the federal marshals' firepower could have killed anyone in the open landscape. The Marshals Service decided to wait out the AIM followers in order to reduce casualties on both sides. Some activists organized an airlift of food supplies to Wounded Knee.

Carter Camp, an AIM spokesperson and organizer of the occupation is quoted saying, "We have 10 or 12", referring to hostages that were allies of Tribal President Richard Wilson. On April 1, the FBI began to hint at division within AIM leadership and other occupiers, but this was refuted by Means and Banks the next day.

Sometime during March, Leonard Crow Dog, the spiritual leader of The American Indian Movement, brought back the Ghost Dance. He claims in his book Crow Dog: Four Generations Sioux of Medicine Men, "My great-grandfather's spirit gave me a vision to do this. The vision told me to revive this ceremony at the place where Chief Big Foot's ghost dancers, three hundred men, women, and children, had been massacred by the army, shot to pieces by cannons, old people, babies." With the help of Wallace Black Elk they got together as many people as possible to participate in the dance that had not been done in 83 years. Before dancing they first had to do the sweat lodge, a purification ritual, then Leonard ran the ghost dance with around 30 dancers, the way his father and uncle (Henry Crow Dog and Dick Fool Bull) had described it to him.

On March 1, Senators James Abourezek and George McGovern came to talk with AIM. Abourezk was sympathetic for his son's house in Pine Ridge was fire-bombed, however McGovern had no liking for what AIM was doing. On March 3, the government sent Colonel Volney Warner, chief of staff of the 82nd Airborne, to see whether or not the army would need to use force to take back Wounded Knee. Warner was also sympathetic to AIM, changing the FBI order from "shoot to kill" to "shoot to wound" and finally to "do not shoot at all", reporting that AIM would not harm anyone. On March 6, the federal spokesman, Erikson, told AIM to "surrender, or else" and to "send all women and children out of Wounded Knee before darkness fell on March 8th" but nothing resulted from this threat.

On March 11, four postal inspectors, thought to be spies by AIM, drove into the town and said they were there to inspect the post office and trading post. AIM's security stopped and disarmed them, finding handguns, handcuffs, and badges. Security took them to the museum and Leonard Crow Dog gave them food and an approximately 30-minute lecture on Indian history and why they were occupying Wounded Knee, afterwards escorting them to the federal lines.

Both AIM and federal government documents show that the two sides traded fire through much of the three months. U.S. Marshal Lloyd Grimm was shot early in the conflict and suffered paralysis from the waist down. Among the many Indian supporters who joined the protest were Frank Clearwater and his pregnant wife, who were Eastern Cherokee from North Carolina. He was shot in the head April 17 within 24 hours of his arrival, while resting in an occupied church, during what was described by both sides as a vicious firefight with federal forces. AIM supporters evacuated Clearwater from the village but he died in a hospital on April 25.

Lawrence "Buddy" Lamont, a local Oglala, was killed by a shot from a federal agent's sniper bullet that went through the heart on April 26 during the biggest shoot-out of the siege, and the next day on April 27 it was reported he had died. He said during the occupation, "If something happens to me I want to stay at Wounded Knee. Don't make any fuss over me. Just bury me in my bunker." He was then buried in his bunker (close to the long trench where the 300 were buried) in a Sioux ceremony by Leonard Crow Dog and Wallace Black Elk.

Ray Robinson, a black civil rights activist, went to South Dakota to join the Wounded Knee occupation. He was seen there by both a journalist and a white activist. He disappeared during the siege and his body was never found. One AIM leader, Carter Camp, said years later that Robinson had walked away under his own power, seeking aid for a wounded leg. Others have recalled open conflict between Robinson and activists over FBI claims.

His widow Cheryl Robinson believes he was murdered during the incident. In 2004, after the conviction of a man for the murder of Anna Mae Aquash, Robinson renewed her calls for an investigation into her husband's death. Paul DeMain, editor of News From Indian Country, has said that based on interviews, he believes "Robinson was killed because, based on a misinformation campaign, some thought he was an FBI spy."

In 2014, the FBI claimed that Robinson had been killed and buried on the reservation in April 1973. Robinson was allegedly killed by AIM members during a confrontation. Robinson's remains have not been found. The FBI said it had closed his case.

=== End ===
After Lamont's death, tribal elders called for an end to the occupation. Knowing the young man and his mother from the reservation, many Oglala grieved after his death. Both sides reached an agreement on May 5 to disarm. The terms included a mandated meeting at Chief Fools Crow's land to discuss reinstating the 1868 Treaty of Fort Laramie. With the decision made, many Oglala Lakota began to leave Wounded Knee at night, walking out through the federal lines. Three days later, the siege ended and the town was evacuated after 71 days of occupation; the government took control of the town.

== Wounded Knee, nation-building and gender ==
The Wounded Knee takeover was a gendered nation-building project. On March 11, 1973, the occupiers declared the "Independent Oglala Nation" and set up a warrior society. Both these events are closely intertwined.

Halfway through the siege, the occupiers declared themselves the Independent Oglala Nation, a nation separate from the United States. In so doing, the occupiers stated that they wanted a return to the treaty-making days and wanted to set up a nation based on the Lakota model of tiospaye (a traditional pre-colonial system of political organization). They also stated, that they wanted a return of the 1868 Fort Laramie Treaty. Both systems were strangely at odds: the Lakota pre-reservation system of tiospaye was based on notions of being Lakota (Lakota-ness) with hereditary chiefs and centered on tribal sovereignty. The reservation system, by contrast, is/was a form of colonial rule with a reservation agent. The nation-building project at Wounded Knee was inherently ambiguous and contradictory in that in combined different ideas about sovereignty and tribal/colonial rule. The warrior society of the Independent Oglala Nation consisted of Native men and women. Many men who took part in the occupation were Vietnam veterans –both Native and non-Native. The setup of the warrior society served as a tool to defend the newly proclaimed nation against outside forces and to establish a deliberate link to a shared or imagined cultural past.

Numerous Native and non-Native women supported the siege –by bringing in supplies (food, ammo, weapons), by keeping the occupation alive as cooks or medics, and/or by serving as armed defenders of the tiny hamlet. The armed participation of women in the siege offset gender dynamics among the occupiers.

Following the end of the occupation, the federal government held two Senate hearings into the issue of sovereignty and the envisioned form of governance. These hearings took place on June 16 and 17, 1973 in Pine Ridge and Kyle on the Pine Ridge reservation and were chaired by South Dakota Senator James Abourezk. However, the federal government speedily rejected Native claims to a return to the nation-to-nation treaty era.

== Public support ==
Public opinion polls revealed widespread sympathy for the Native Americans at Wounded Knee. They also received support from the Congressional Black Caucus as well as various actors, activists, and prominent public figures, including Marlon Brando, Johnny Cash, Angela Davis, Jane Fonda, William Kunstler, and Tom Wicker.

After DOJ prohibited the media from the site, press attention decreased. However, actor Marlon Brando, an AIM supporter, asked Sacheen Littlefeather, President of the National Native American Affirmative Image Committee, to speak at the 45th Academy Awards on his behalf, as he had been nominated for his performance in The Godfather. She appeared at the March 27 ceremony in traditional Apache clothing. When his name was announced as the winner, she said that he declined the award due to "the treatment of American Indians today by the film industry ... and on television and movie reruns and also with recent happenings at Wounded Knee" in an improvised speech, as she was told she could not give the original speech given to her by Brando and was warned that she would be physically taken off and arrested if she was on stage for more than a minute. Afterwards, she read his original words about Wounded Knee backstage to many of the press. This recaptured the attention of millions in the United States and world media. AIM supporters and participants thought Littlefeather's speech to be a major victory for their movement. Although Angela Davis was turned away by federal forces as an "undesirable person" when she attempted to enter Wounded Knee in March 1973, AIM participants believed that the attention garnered by such public figures forestalled U.S. military intervention.

== Aftermath ==
Following the end of the 1973 stand-off, the Pine Ridge Indian Reservation had a higher rate of internal violence. Residents complained of physical attacks and intimidation by President Richard Wilson's followers, the so-called GOONS or Guardians of the Oglala Nation. The murder rate between March 1, 1973, and March 1, 1976, averaged 56.7 per 100,000 per annum (170 per 100,000 over the whole period). Detroit had a rate of 20.2 per 100,000 in 1974 and at the time was considered "the murder capital of the US". The national average was 9.7 per 100,000. More than 60 opponents of the tribal government allegedly died violently during this period, including Pedro Bissonette, executive director of OSCRO. AIM representatives said many were unsolved murders, but in 2002 the FBI issued a report disputing this.

According to Ward Churchill, despite the FBI's claims, there were many suspicious events surrounding murders of AIM activists and their subsequent investigations or lack thereof. Churchill states that the deaths of AIM activists went uninvestigated, even though there was an abundance of FBI agents on Pine Ridge Indian Reservation at the time.

For instance, Annie Mae Aquash was an activist who had been present at Wounded Knee and was later suspected of being a spy for the government. It was later revealed that most of this campaign to discredit her can be traced to Douglass Durham, an FBI informant. Aquash was found dead near Highway 73 on February 24, 1976. Her cause of death was initially ruled as exposure, suggesting that alcohol had been involved, even though there was none in her bloodstream. Dissatisfied with this finding, an exhumation was requested by OSCRO, which found that Aquash had been shot in the back of her head at close range. AIM members Arlo Looking Cloud and John Graham were convicted of Aquash's murder in 2004 and 2010; both received life sentences. Additionally, AIM activist Thelma Rios pled guilty as an accessory to the kidnapping.

In 2000, the FBI released a report regarding these alleged unsolved violent deaths during this time on Pine Ridge Reservation and accounted for most of the deaths, and disputed the claims of unsolved and political murders. The report stated that only four deaths were unsolved and that some deaths were not murders.

=== 1974 Tribal Chairman election: Means vs. Wilson ===
In 1974, Russell Means ran against Wilson. Wilson won the election, even though he lost to Means in the primary. At AIM's behest, the U.S. Commission on Civil Rights investigated the election and found that it had been "permeated with fraud". The fraudulent actions included voter fraud, a lack of poll watchers, and a lack of oversight. However, no formal action was taken to rectify this, and Wilson remained in charge.

=== 1974 trial of Banks and Means, 1975 appeal ===
After an eight-and-a-half-month trial the U.S. District Court of South Dakota (Fred Joseph Nichol, presiding judge) dismissed the charges against Banks and Means for conspiracy and assault (both Banks and Means were defended by William Kunstler and Mark Lane). The jury had voted 12–0 to acquit both defendants of the conspiracy charge, but before the second vote one juror suffered a stroke and could not continue deliberations. The government refused to accept a verdict of eleven jurors and sought a mistrial; in the meantime, the defense team filed a motion for judgment of acquittal.

The judge ruled to dismiss, citing prosecutorial misconduct, stating: "It is my belief, however, that the misconduct by the government in this case is so aggravated that a dismissal must be entered in the interests of justice." In 1975 the Eighth Circuit Court of Appeals held that the government's appeal was barred by the Double Jeopardy Clause and dismissed it, "despite Government's argument that jurisdiction should be assumed due to the public interest in fair trials designed to end in just judgements".

=== Leonard Crow Dog's arrest ===
On September 5, 1975, FBI agents came into Leonard Crow Dog's home (Crow Dog's Paradise) and arrested him for preventing federal officers from performing their assignment. His trial was held in January 1976 in Rapid City, South Dakota, where he was found guilty in under an hour. He was later released in September 1976 after his legal team brought in thousands of support letters from around the globe.

== Legacy ==
The legacy of the Siege of Wounded Knee is rife with disagreements, due to the controversial approaches of AIM and the FBI. The FBI has faced criticism for their speculated underhanded attempts to undermine AIM through COINTELPRO-like methods, such as releasing false information and having undercover individuals sow disorder within AIM and Wounded Knee. It has also been suggested that the FBI and the federal government in general were too focused on Watergate at the time to give the situation at Wounded Knee the attention it deserved. If the federal government were more focused on Wounded Knee, it might not have lasted as long as it did.

AIM's handling of Wounded Knee has also met its fair share of critics. Special Agent in Charge at the time, Joseph H. Trimbach, has argued that AIM used federal funds to purchase weaponry, rather than aid the American Indian people. Trimbach and others have also suggested that AIM members murdered Anna Mae Aquash because they thought she was a spy. Even individuals within the movement, such as Mary Crow Dog, have been critical of AIM. In her autobiography, Mary Crow Dog says, "There were a lot of things wrong with AIM. We did not see these things, or did not want to see them."

On June 30, 1980, the Great Sioux Reservation won a legal case in the Supreme Court that acknowledges the illegality of U.S. acquisition of reservation land in 1876. The Sioux claim had perpetually been tossed out by the courts since the 1920s, and the case reached the Supreme Court through no coincidence. Following a decade of media exposure and fights for Tribal Sovereignty, the American Indian narrative became known, as opposed to being brushed away.

During the one-hundred-year anniversary of the 1890 Wounded Knee Massacre, in 1990, Russell Means barred South Dakota Governor George S. Mickelson from taking part in commemorating the dead there. Means argued, "It would be an insult because we live in the racist state of South Dakota, and he is the Governor."

Despite disputes about the handling of Wounded Knee, the incident shed a light on the problems facing American Indians and showed them that they could have a voice. Wounded Knee is now an important symbol of American Indian activism, fittingly building on its initial symbolic meaning of the atrocities committed by the US government against American Indian people.

== See also ==
- Lakota Woman, 1990 memoir by Mary Brave Bird concerning in part the Wounded Knee Occupation
- Thunderheart, 1992 film, a loosely based fictional portrayal of events relating to the Wounded Knee incident in 1973
- Leonard Peltier
- Occupation of Alcatraz
- List of incidents of civil unrest in the United States
