= Mary Brave Bird =

Sicangu Lakota writer and activist from South Dakota (1954–2013

- Born: Mary Ellen Moore-Richard; September 26, 1954; Rosebud Indian Reservation, South Dakota, U.S.
- Died: February 14, 2013 (aged 58); Crystal Lake, Nevada County, California, U.S.
- Other names: Mary Crow Dog; Ohitika Win; Brave Woman; Mary Brave Woman Olguin
- Citizenship: Rosebud Sioux Tribe and US
- Occupations: Author and Activist
- Known for: Lakota Woman; American Indian Movement
- Movement: American Indian Movement (AIM)
- Spouse(s): Leonard Crow Dog (divorced); Rudi Olguin (separated)
- Children: Robert He Crow Francisco "Rudy" Olguin Henry Crow Dog Leonard Crow Dog, Jr. Jennifer Crow Dog Summer Rose Olguin
- Awards: American Book Award

Mary Brave Bird, also known as Mary Brave Woman Olguin and Mary Crow Dog (September 26, 1954 – February 14, 2013) was a Sicangu Lakota writer and activist who was a member of the American Indian Movement during the 1970s and participated in some of their most publicized events, including the Wounded Knee Incident when she was 18 years old.

Brave Bird lived with her youngest children on the Rosebud Indian Reservation, South Dakota. Her 1990 memoir Lakota Woman won an American Book Award in 1991, became a national bestseller, and was adapted as a made-for-TV-movie in 1994.

== Early life and education ==
Born Mary Ellen Moore-Richard in 1954 on the Rosebud Indian Reservation, South Dakota, she was a member of the Sicangu Oyate, also known as the Burnt Thighs Nation or Brulé Band of Lakota. She was raised primarily by her grandparents while her mother studied in nursing school and was working.

Brave Bird was influenced by several relatives who followed traditional practices, including her granduncle Dick Fool Bull, who introduced her to the Native American Church. During the 1960s, Brave Bird attended the St. Francis Indian School, in St. Francis, South Dakota, a Roman Catholic boarding school. While attending, she published a newspaper revealing the nature of how the school abused students and stripped them of their native cultures. As punishment, Brave Bird was beaten by the teachers.

== Career ==
In 1971 Brave Bird was inspired by a talk by Leonard Crow Dog and at age 18 joined the American Indian Movement (AIM). She participated in such historical events as the 1972 Trail of Broken Treaties and subsequent occupation of the BIA headquarters in Washington, DC. She was also part of the 1973 Occupation of Wounded Knee.

== Marriage and family ==
Brave Bird married AIM spiritual leader Leonard Crow Dog. The couple later divorced.

In 1991, she married Rudy Olguin. They had daughter Summer Olguin that year. Later they had a second child, Rudy Olguin. She had six children in total. She was a grandmother and remained active in the Native American Church.

== Writing career ==
Brave Bird was the author of two memoirs, Lakota Woman (1990) and Ohitika Woman (1993), and a shortlived newspaper when she was in a boarding school. Richard Erdoes, a long-time friend, helped edit the books. Lakota Woman was published under the name Mary Crow Dog and won the 1991 American Book Award. It describes her life until 1977. Ohitika Woman continues her life story.

Her books describe the conditions of the Lakota Indian and her experience growing up on the Rosebud Indian Reservation in South Dakota, conditions in the neighboring Pine Ridge Indian Reservation under the leadership of tribal chairman Richard Wilson, and how life as a native was in Rapid City. She also covers aspects of the role of the FBI, the U.S. Bureau of Indian Affairs and the treatment of the Native Americans and their children in the mid-1900s. Her work focuses on themes of gender, identity, and race.

Crow Dog and Brave Bird made cameo appearances in the 1991 Oliver Stone film The Doors.

== Movie ==
Brave Bird's memoir was adapted as the 1994 movie Lakota Woman: Siege at Wounded Knee, produced by TNT and Jane Fonda. The film starred Irene Bedard as Mary Brave Bird. The movie depicted the events that occurred during the 1973 uprising of the AIM (American Indian Movement) organization and their stand-off at Wounded Knee. Brave Bird has a cameo appearance in the film.

== Published works ==
- Brave Bird, Mary, with Richard Erdoes. Ohitika Woman. New York: Grove Press, 1993. ISBN 0-8021-1436-9; LCCN 92--46169
- Crow Dog, Mary, with Richard Erdoes. Lakota Woman. New York: Grove Weidenfeld, 1990. ISBN 978-0-8021-4542-0; ISBN 978-0-8021-9155-7 (ebook)
