= Henry Crow Dog =

Rosebud Indian Reservation Sioux medicine man

Henry Crow Dog was a Rosebud Indian Reservation Sioux medicine man who resided on his land, Crow Dog's Paradise.

== Henry Crow Dog and Dennis Banks ==
In 1970, Henry Crow Dog introduced Dennis Banks, a Leech Lake Indian Reservation Ojibwe and leader of the American Indian Movement, about Lakota religion. Dennis Banks sought out Henry Crow Dog for this purpose after he realized that he and most of AIM had very little Native American spiritual knowledge or guidance. Crow Dog then taught Banks the Inipi, Yuwipi, and Sun Dance ceremonies. Henry Crow Dog's son, Leonard Crow Dog, soon became the spiritual leader of AIM and Crow Dog's Paradise soon became a meeting place for the organization.
