= Leonard Crow Dog =

Native American activist (1942–2021)

- Born: August 18, 1942; Rosebud Indian Reservation, South Dakota, U.S.
- Died: June 5, 2021 (aged 78); Crow Dog's Paradise, Rosebud, South Dakota, U.S.
- Occupations: Author and activist
- Known for: Wounded Knee; American Indian Movement
- Board member of: Sinte Gleska University
- Spouses: Jo Ann Roulette Crowdog (m. 1998): Francine Cloudman (divorced) Mary Brave Bird (divorced)
- Children: 9

Leonard Crow Dog (Kangi Súŋka; August 18, 1942 – June 5, 2021) was a Lakota spiritual leader and medicine man. He became well known during the Lakota takeover and occupation of the town of Wounded Knee on the Pine Ridge Indian Reservation in South Dakota in 1973, known as the Wounded Knee Incident. Through his writings and teachings, he sought to unify Indian people of all nations. As a practitioner of traditional herbal medicine and a leader of Sun Dance ceremonies, Crow Dog was dedicated to keeping Lakota traditions alive.

== Background ==
Leonard Crow Dog was born on August 18, 1942, into a Sicangu Lakota family on the Rosebud Indian Reservation in South Dakota. He was a descendant of a traditional family of medicine men and leaders. The name Crow Dog is a poor translation of Kȟaŋǧí Šuŋkmánitu (lit. ''crow-coyote''). His parents believed he would be a healer so they did not send him to school. Therefore he grew up not knowing how to read or write. At the age of seven Crow Dog was initiated by four medicine men. He embarked on his first vision quest at the age of 13.

== American Indian Movement ==
In 1970 the Native American activist Dennis Banks met with Crow Dog. Banks had been seeking a spiritual leader for the American Indian Movement (AIM), which had started among urban Indians in Minneapolis in 1968. Crow Dog had already been trying to unite people on the Rosebud Indian Reservation to organize and work together on issues affecting Indians.

AIM organized the large march of the 1972 Trail of Broken Treaties to Washington, D.C., to demand presidential attention to Indian issues. They campaigned on behalf of Indian veterans who were not getting the services they needed. Crow Dog also led protests in Rapid City and the town of Custer, South Dakota to demand justice for hate crimes against the Lakota.

Crow Dog’s priorities shaped the Native American Self-Determination and Education Act, a landmark bill signed in 1975 that swung the pendulum away from assimilation and toward greater respect for cultural traditions.

The atmosphere on the Pine Ridge Indian Reservation, which borders Rosebud, became increasingly tense. Tribal chairman Dick Wilson, believed by opponents to have been fraudulently elected, had accrued much power. He created a personal police unit, known as the Guardians of the Oglala Nation (GOONs), which was used to suppress political opposition. Residents of Pine Ridge who were tired of corruption in tribal government and mistreatment by whites gathered to protest. In 1973 the Oglala Lakota of Pine Ridge took over the village of Wounded Knee to demand justice from the federal government and an end to Wilson's tenure.

The takeover of Wounded Knee had special meaning for Crow Dog because his great-grandfather, Jerome Crow Dog, had been a Ghost Dancer. After receiving a vision, Jerome had warned several dancers to stay away from a large gathering of tribes in 1890; he saved them from being victims of the Wounded Knee Massacre. When Leonard Crow Dog went to Wounded Knee in 1973, he was very moved. He later said:

Standing on the hill where so many people were buried in a common grave, standing there in that cold darkness under the stars, I felt tears running down my face. I can't describe what I felt. I heard the voices of the long-dead ghost dancers crying out to us.

== Incarceration ==
Shortly after the Wounded Knee incident ended, the federal government began prosecuting AIM leaders for various charges. One early September morning in 1975, 185 FBI officers, federal marshals, and SWAT teams showed up at Crow Dog's Paradise looking for Leonard Peltier, who was a suspect in the murders of two FBI agents at Pine Ridge Reservation. They arrested Crow Dog as a suspect; he was first held at the maximum security unit at Leavenworth, where he was placed in solitary confinement for two weeks. Afterwards he was moved from one prison to another many times after he was convicted and sentenced to a long term in prison.

The National Council of Churches took up Crow Dog's case and raised $150,000 for his appeal. Vine Deloria, Jr. was one of the attorneys involved on his behalf. However, his appeal was denied. When Crow Dog's defense team went before a judge to apply for a sentence reduction, they saw a long table stacked with letters and petitions from all over the world in support of Crow Dog. The federal judge ordered that Crow Dog be immediately released. He had already served nearly two years of his sentence.

== Personal life ==
Crow Dog married his first wife, Francine, in the Native American Church. He took the name "Defends His Medicine", in reference to the sacred peyote plant.

Shortly after Wounded Knee, Crow Dog began his second marriage. He was married to Mary Ellen Moore, later known as Brave Bird, with a pipe ceremony. They lived at Crow Dog's Paradise with Crow Dog's parents, three children from his previous marriage, and Mary's son, Pedro.

His son, Leonard Alden Crow Dog, became an artist, spiritual leader, and Sundance Chief. His step-daughter was Jancita Eagle Deer, who died in

Crow Dog married Joanne Roulette in 1998. Mary Brave Bird died on February 14, 2013.

Crow Dog died at the age of 78 on June 5, 2021, in Rapid City, South Dakota, from liver cancer. In a statement posted on Facebook, Philip Yenyo, executive director of the American Indian Movement of Ohio, called Crow Dog's death a "huge loss to the Indigenous community of Turtle Island and to the American Indian Movement.”

== Works ==
- Crow Dog, Leonard; Erdoes, Richard (1995). Crow Dog: Four Generations of Sioux Medicine Men. HarperCollins Publishers. ISBN 978-0-06-016861-2.

Crow Dog recounts family history through four generations of the Crow Dog family. The book details ghost dancers, a group who brought a "new way of praying, of relating to the spirits"; Jerome Crow Dog, Leonard Crow Dog's great-grandfather, who was the first Native American to win a case in the Supreme Court in ex parte Crow Dog; and Leonard's father, Henry, who introduced peyote for sacred use to the Lakota Sioux. Crow Dog also details Lakota tribal ceremonies and their meanings, and his perspective on the 1972 march on Washington and the 1973 siege of Wounded Knee.
