= Dick Wilson (tribal chairman) =

Oglala Lakota Tribal chairman, 1972-76 (1934–1990)

Richard A. Wilson (April 29, 1934 – January 31, 1990) was the chairman (also called president) of the Oglala Lakota of the Pine Ridge Indian Reservation in South Dakota. He served from 1972 to 1976, following re-election in 1974.

Following complaints about his favoring friends and family in award of jobs and suppressing political opponents with his private militia, Guardians of the Oglala Nation (GOONs), members of the tribal council brought impeachment charges against him in February 1973. The prosecution was unprepared when Wilson said he was ready to go to trial, and the proceedings closed without completing the impeachment trial. No impeachment proceedings were renewed. Several hundred Lakota people marched in protest, demanding the removal of Wilson from office. US Marshals were assigned to protect Wilson and his family. American Indian Movement (AIM) and Lakota supporters occupied the town of Wounded Knee, and a 71-day armed siege resulted, known as the Wounded Knee Occupation. Two Native Americans were shot and killed and a US Marshal severely wounded during this period.

Wilson remained in office and, following the occupation, violence increased on the reservation, with residents reporting attacks by his henchmen. More than 50 of Wilson's opponents allegedly died violently in the next three years, although this was disputed by a 2000 FBI report. The 1974 tribal chairman election was disputed, and a US Civil Rights Commission investigation showed electoral abuses amid fear and violence, and reported the election as invalid. A federal court upheld the results of the election and Wilson won. Political violence continued on the reservation. After being strongly defeated in the 1976 election for tribal chairman, Wilson moved with his family off the reservation. By 1990 Wilson had returned to Pine Ridge; he was campaigning for a seat on the tribal council at the time of his death.

== Early life and education ==
Born on the Pine Ridge Reservation in South Dakota, Wilson grew up in the town of Pine Ridge. He continued to live there as an adult. He learned the plumber's trade and worked at that craft as an adult. He and his wife had ten children.

Wilson entered politics when he ran and was elected as a councilor to represent the village of Pine Ridge in the Oglala Sioux Tribal Council. Serving for six years, he chaired the council's Labor committee. There were allegations that he diverted tribal funds for his own purposes and used his private quasi-law enforcement group to intimidate opponents with violence and murder.

== Tribal chairmanship ==
=== Election as Tribal Chairman ===
In 1972 Wilson ran against the incumbent tribal chairman, Gerald One Feather. Before the election, his political connections were largely limited to Pine Ridge due to his years as a councilor, but he campaigned in all parts of the reservation and sought the support of both traditionalists and progressives. He did not support protests that year organized by AIM. The election was close, but Wilson won five of the reservation's nine districts and won heavily in Pine Ridge village.

Wilson was inaugurated on April 10, 1972. He helped set up the first Indian housing authority on the reservation. He also began showing what his detractors would describe as authoritarian behavior. In his first week, he challenged the eligibility of council member Birgil L. Kills Straight because of residency requirements. He preferred governing using the five-member executive council instead of consulting with the full tribal council of 18, which several times he called into session on important issues only belatedly.

Wilson's main supporters were from within the town of Pine Ridge. The traditionals, who tended to be full-bloods who lived on the outskirts and followed older practices, would criticize Wilson for being too close to whites. Officials of the Bureau of Indian Affairs (BIA) continued to have a significant role in reservation affairs. Opponents criticized Wilson for favoring mixed-bloods (he was of mixed-race ancestry) over full-blood Oglala, and giving "special attention" and benefits to his friends and relatives. In response, Wilson reportedly said, "There's nothing in tribal law against nepotism."

At the time, the Lakota Sioux had brought suit against the US government for the taking of the Black Hills in 1877, in violation of the 1868 Treaty of Fort Laramie that had established the Great Sioux Reservation. Wilson favored reaching a financial settlement with the US government and using the money to invest in infrastructure, education and other improvements for the tribe. By contrast, the traditionals wanted to refuse anything less than the full return of the property to the Lakota.

Following the murder of Wesley Bad Heart Bull in a border town in early 1973, AIM chapters began forming in many places on the reservation. The Oglala Lakota saw a continuing pattern of discriminatory attacks against them in towns off the reservation, which police did not prosecute at all or not according to the severity of the crimes; they were also increasingly discontented with the poor conditions at Pine Ridge. Heated debates between AIM members and Wilson began to arise and escalate. Off-reservation AIM leaders threatened to bring their activism to Pine Ridge. Wilson agreed with AIM members that there was serious social damage from the high rates of unemployment, suicide, and alcoholism at Pine Ridge. He also believed that the US government had illegally broken land treaties with the Sioux, but Wilson considered AIM's militancy "more as threat than a savior" for the Indian people. Wilson would later characterize AIM activists as "the only major Indian problem...bums trying to get their braids and mugs in the press."

Wilson harshly criticized AIM for the Bureau of Indian Affairs building takeover in Washington, DC in November 1972. During the incident at the BIA headquarters building, irreplaceable Indian land deeds were lost and destroyed. Wilson warned Russell Means not to bring activist violence to Pine Ridge. He obtained a restraining order to prohibit Means and Severt Young Bear from participating in any assemblies at the reservation. When Means spoke at a landowners' association meeting later that month at the invitation of Tribal Vice Chairman David Long, Wilson had Means arrested and tried to suspend Long from office.

In late 1972, Wilson formed a private militia, which he called Guardians of the Oglala Nation (GOONs). He said that an earlier council resolution giving the chairman powers to maintain law and order was sufficient authority; he may have illegally financed the militia with tribal funds. The GOONs were accused of violence against and suppression of Wilson's political enemies.

=== Impeachment trial ===
On February 9, 1973, tribal councilors Sioux Long, Kills Straight, and C. Hobart Keith introduced eight charges of impeachment against Wilson at a council meeting. They charged him with nepotism in hiring tribal government staff, operating the tribe without a budget, two counts of misappropriating tribal resources for personal use, failing to compel the treasurer to make an audit report, failing to call the full tribal council according to the bylaws, using the executive committee to bypass the housing board, and illegally arresting Keith.

The Oglala Sioux Tribal Council suspended Wilson by an 11–7 vote. They would need a two-thirds vote to impeach him. Hearings began on February 22. Wilson declined the waiting period permitted him and arraigned for the impeachment proceedings to commence immediately. The council unanimously approved Vincent Thunder Bull as presiding officer for the impeachment trial, which began the next day.

Having expected Wilson to use the waiting period, the prosecution had not fully prepared its case. After Thunder Bull refused to permit the introduction of additional charges, four opposition council members and much of audience left the trial in frustration. Shortly thereafter, the remaining council voted 14–0 to close the impeachment proceedings.

Several hundred protesters marched in Pine Ridge after the council meeting. Because of the heightened tension, Stanley Lyman, the BIA superintendent at the reservation, ordered the United States Marshals Service to place Wilson and his family in protective custody.

=== Wounded Knee ===
On February 27, four days after the termination of Wilson's impeachment trial, local protesters and AIM activists seized the town of Wounded Knee, in protest of the outcome of the impeachment hearing. They demanded Wilson's removal from office. A letter within AIM Chapters stated,

February 27, 1973, AIM Organization accepted the responsibility of providing all necessary strength and protection needed by the Oglala Sioux in the efforts to rid themselves of corrupt tribal president, Dick Wilson. Because this degenerated human being is financed and wholly supported by the FBI, CIA, BIA, U.S. Justice Dept., and the U.S. Marshals, it is virtually impossible to for any Oglala to voice any kind of opinion which may run contrary to this puppet government with out being arrested or beaten...a policy that cannot go unchallenged or unanswered.

The resulting standoff with law enforcement lasted seventy-one days, resulted in two protesters dead and one marshal paralyzed and drew national attention to the issues of Native American rights and conflicts on the reservation. While the standoff was underway, Wilson tried again to suspend Long from the Vice Chairmanship. He also fired tribal employees who had protested against him.

On April 4, 1973, a group of AIM Wounded Knee occupants were caught by FBI Agents while leaving Wounded Knee. They were heavily armed and had a list of names of people who were to be "done away with". Wilson and members of his "GOON squad" were on the list.

=== After Wounded Knee ===
Violent conflict on the reservation continued after the resolution of the Wounded Knee incident. In the three years that followed, more than 50 opponents of Wilson allegedly died violently. One was Pedro Bissonette, head of the civil rights organization, who had originally invited AIM activists to Pine Ridge. He died in a reported altercation with a BIA policeman. Residents accused GOONs of arson and frequent assault. Wilson was alleged to have personally directed an assault on six AIM lawyers in February 1975, but no charges were filed. In 2000, the FBI released a report regarding these alleged unsolved violent deaths during this time on Pine Ridge Reservation and accounted for most of the deaths, and disputed the claims of unsolved and political murders. The report stated that only four deaths were unsolved and that some deaths were not murders.

When Wilson ran for reelection in 1974, he faced a dozen challengers. He placed second in the primary, and defeated Russell Means in the runoff election on February 7. A United States Civil Rights Commission investigation reported ballot tampering, a large number of ineligible voters, improprieties in the appointment of the election commission, and "a climate of fear and tension." Its report concluded the election results were invalid, but a federal court upheld Wilson's reelection. Wilson was only the third person to be elected to consecutive terms as Oglala Sioux Tribal Chair since the position was created in 1936.

In the 1976 election for tribal president, Wilson was defeated by Al Trimble by a wide margin.

== Later life ==
Wilson moved out of Pine Ridge after the 1976 election. He eventually returned and was campaigning for a council seat when he died in 1990 from kidney failure and an enlarged heart.
