= Wounded Knee, South Dakota =

Wounded Knee Čaŋkpé Opí (Lakota)
- Census-designated place
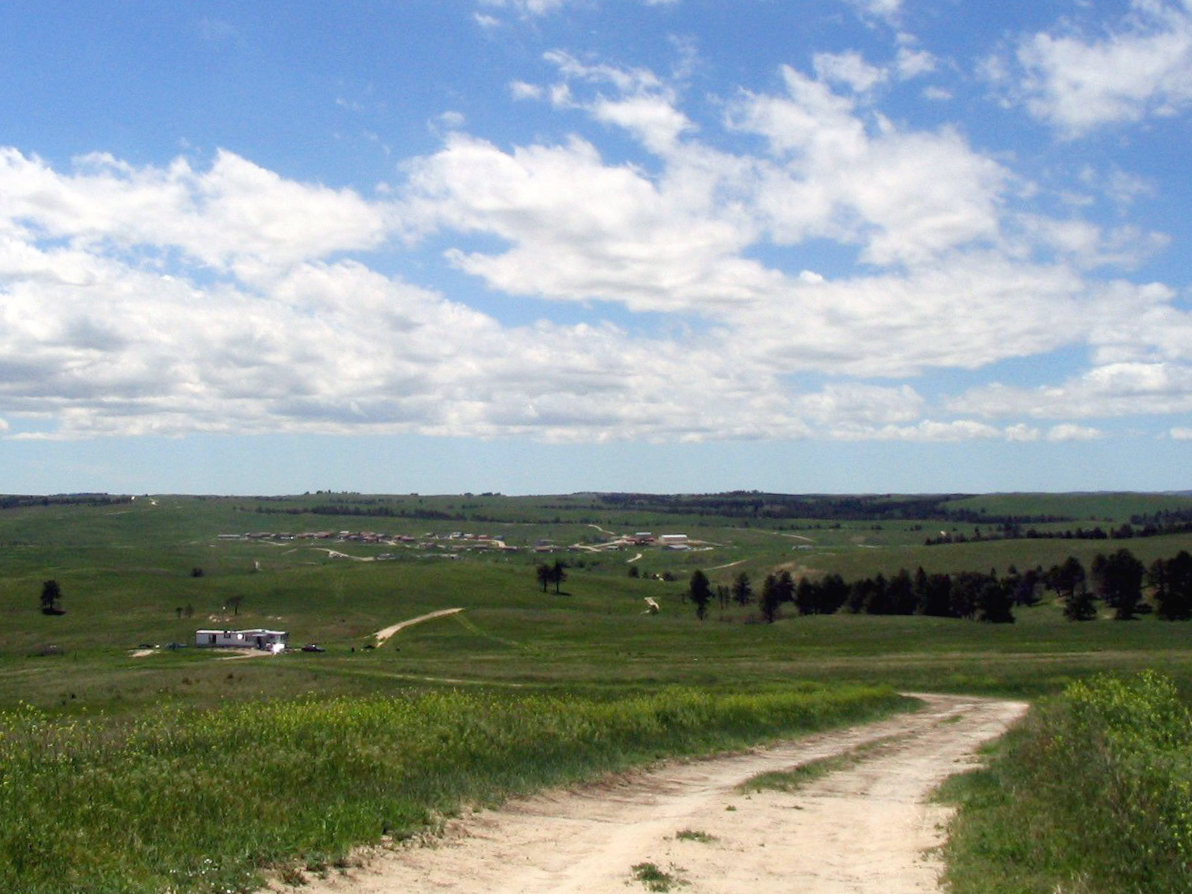
- Wounded Knee in 2005

- Location within the state of South Dakota Wounded Knee (the United States)
- Coordinates: 43°08′44″N 102°22′20″W
- Country: United States
- State: South Dakota
- County: Oglala Lakota

Area
  - Total: 1.07 sq mi (2.77 km^{2})
  - Land: 1.07 sq mi (2.77 km^{2})
  - Water: 0 sq mi (0.00 km^{2})
- Elevation: 3,235 ft (986 m)

Population (2020)
  - Total: 364
  - Density: 340.1/sq mi (131.33/km^{2})
- Time zone: UTC-7 (Mountain (MST))
  - Summer (DST): UTC-6 (MDT)
- ZIP code: 57794
- Area code: 605
- FIPS code: 46-72900
- GNIS feature ID: 2393868

Wounded Knee (Lakota: Čaŋkpé Opí) is a census-designated place (CDP) on the Pine Ridge Indian Reservation in Oglala Lakota County, South Dakota, United States. The population was 364 at the 2020 census.

The town is named for the Wounded Knee Creek which runs through the region. The bones and heart of the Sioux chief Crazy Horse were reputedly buried along this creek by his family following his death in 1877. The town lies within the Pine Ridge Reservation, territory of the Oglala Lakota (Sioux).

== History ==
On December 29, 1890, in the same area, in an incident known as the Wounded Knee Massacre, the United States 7th Cavalry killed more than 300 men, women and children who were being relocated to the Sioux reservation at Pine Ridge.

On February 27, 1973, during the Wounded Knee Occupation, the American Indian Movement (AIM) occupied the Pine Ridge Reservation near Wounded Knee in protest against the federal government and its policies related to Native Americans. A 71-day standoff between federal authorities and the AIM ensued. The group members surrendered on May 8.

== Geography ==
According to the United States Census Bureau, the CDP has a total area of 1.1 square miles (2.8 km^{2}), all land.

== Demographics ==
Historical population
Census	Pop.	Note	%±
1990	18		—
2000	328		1,722.2%
2010	382		16.5%
2020	364		−4.7%
U.S. Decennial Census

As of the census of 2000, there were 328 people, 54 households, and 52 families residing in the CDP. The population density was 306.0 inhabitants per square mile (118.1/km^{2}). There were 56 housing units at an average density of 52.2/sq mi (20.2/km^{2}). The racial makeup of the CDP was 98.78% Native American and 1.22% White. Hispanics or Latinos of any race were 0.91% of the population.

There were 54 households, of which 61.1% had children under the age of 18 living with them, 51.9% were married couples living together, 35.2% had a female householder with no husband present, and 1.9% were non-families. Of all households 1.9% were made up of individuals, and no households had someone living alone who was 65 years old or older. The average household size was 6.07 and the average family size was 6.04.

In the CDP, the population was spread out, with 50.6% under the age of 18, 10.4% from 18 to 24, 22.0% from 25 to 44, 10.4% from 45 to 64, and 3.7% who were 65 years old or older. The median age was 18 years. For every 100 females, there were 108.9 males. For every 100 females age 18 and over, there were 102.5 males.

The median income for a household in the CDP was $12,206. Males had a median income of $11,889, females had $13,333. The per capita income for the CDP was $2,403. About 72.2% of families and 81.1% of the population were below the poverty line, including 83.8% of those under age 18 and none of those aged 65 or over.

== Education ==
The CDP is served by Oglala Lakota County School District 65-1.

== See also ==
- List of census-designated places in South Dakota
