= Gladys (given name) =

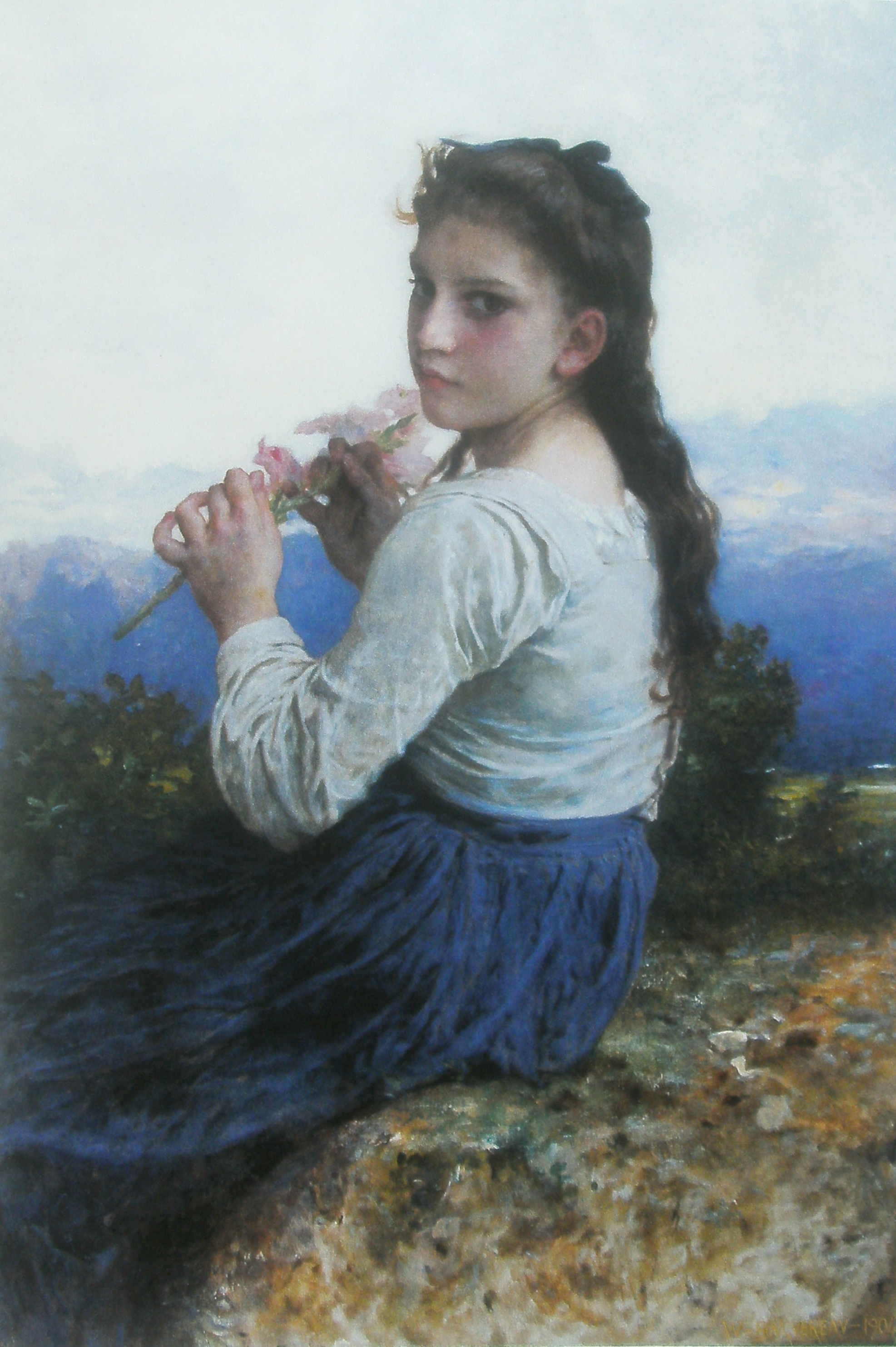
- The Gladiolus by William-Adolphe Bouguereau, 1904. The name Gladys has often been associated with the gladiolus due to their similarity in sound.
- Gender: Female

Origin
- Meaning: Unknown
- Region of origin: Welsh

Other names
- Related names: Gwladys

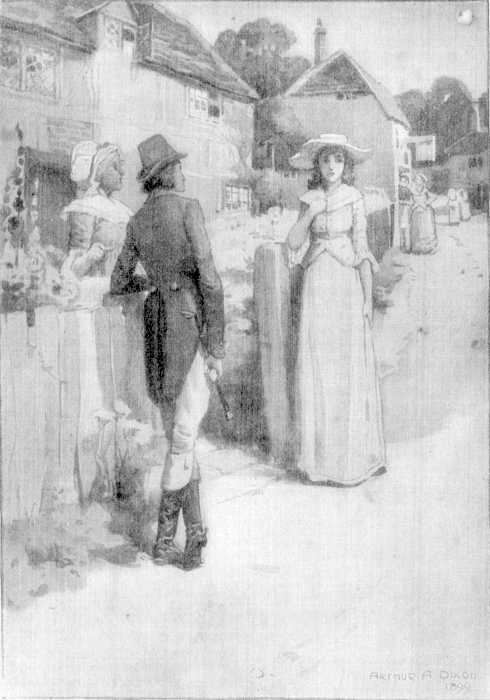
An illustration from an edition of Gladys the Reaper, an 1860 romance novel by Anne Beale.

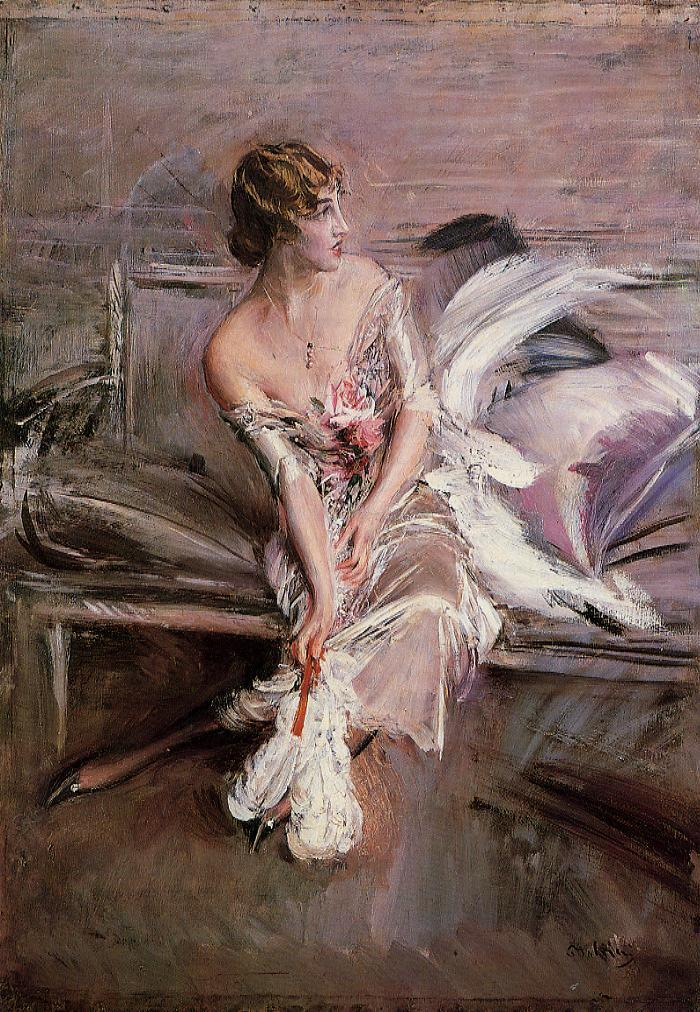
Gladys Deacon (1881–1971) by Giovanni Boldini, in 1901.

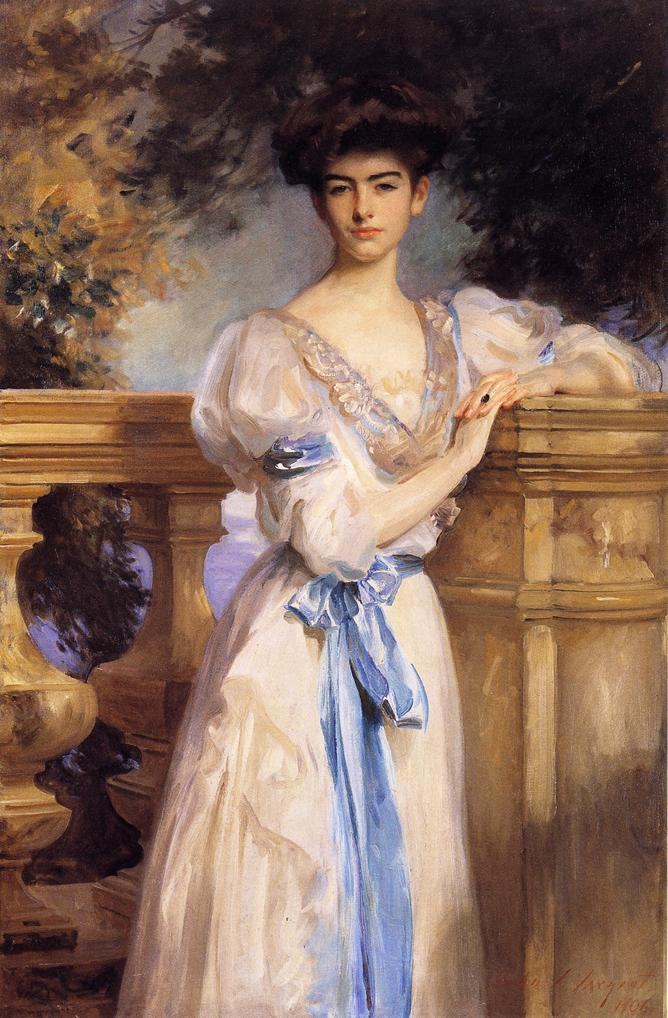
Gladys Vanderbilt (1886–1965), an American heiress and socialite, painted by John Singer Sargent in 1906.

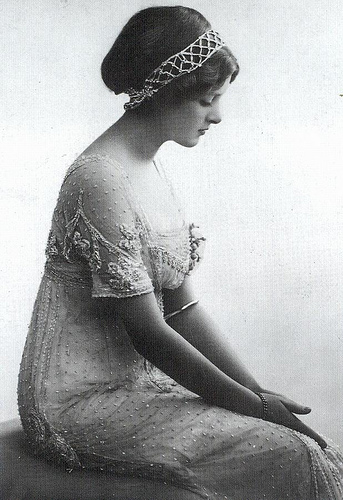
Gladys Cooper (1888–1971), a British actress, photographed c. 1910.

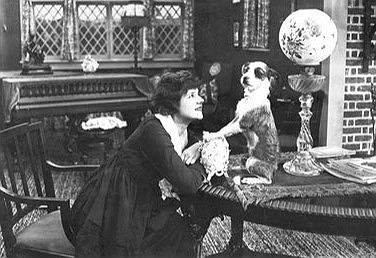
American actress Gladys Hulette (1896–1991), and the dog Panthus in a scene from Prudence the Pirate from the October 21, 1916 issue of Moving Picture World.

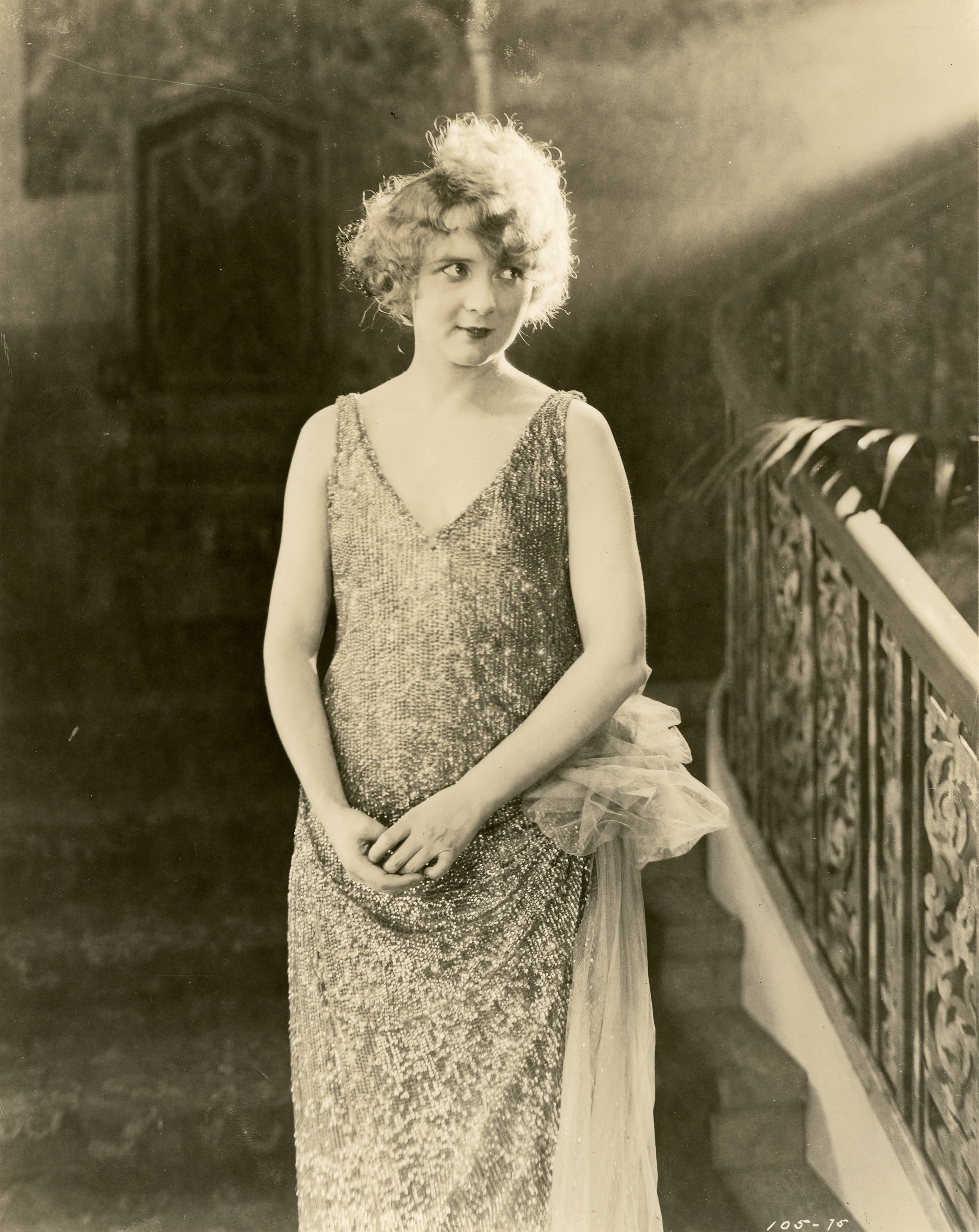
Gladys Leslie (1899–1976), American actress, pictured in a role in 1921.

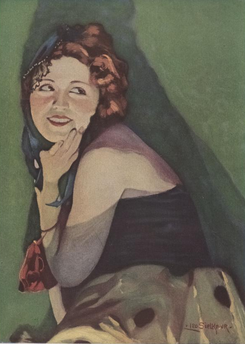
American actress Gladys Walton (1903–1993), in 1921.

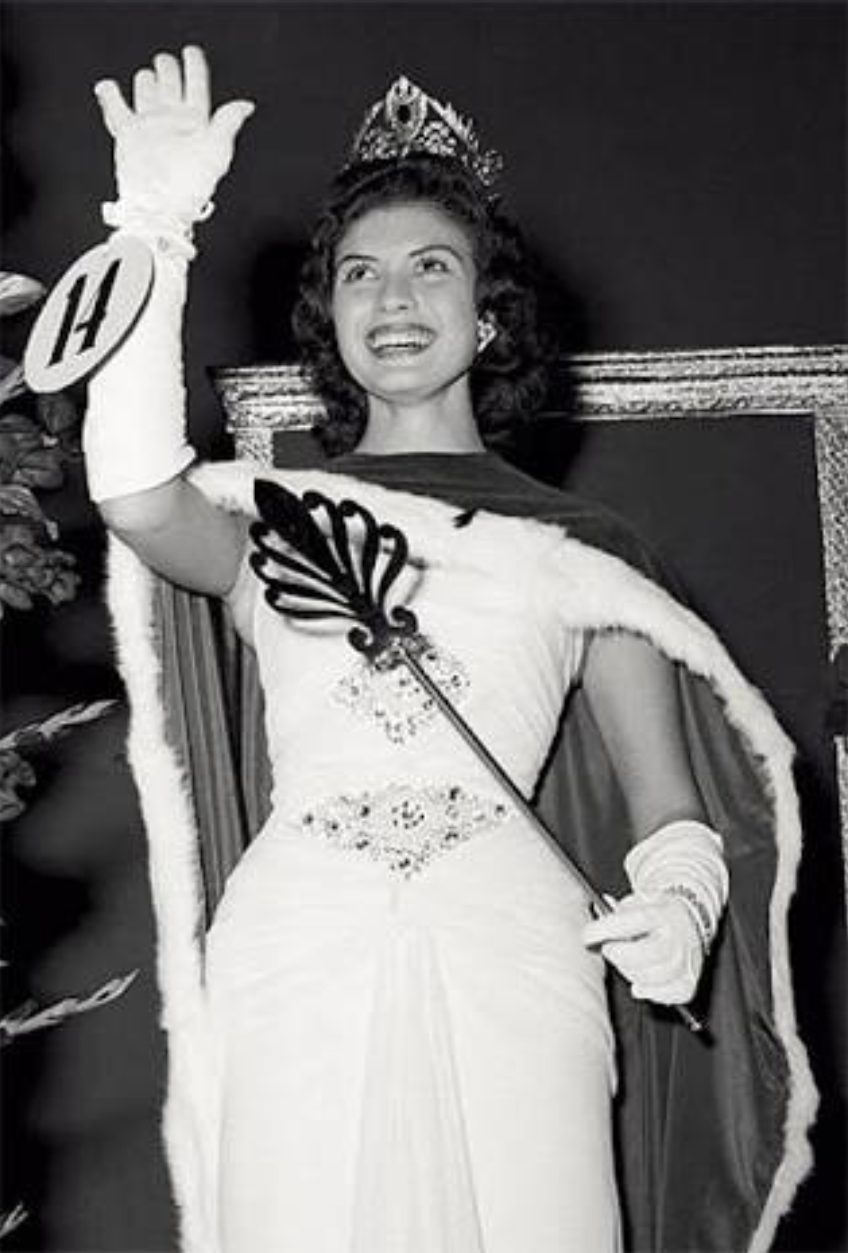
Gladys Zender (born 1939), Peruvian model and beauty queen, pictured in 1957.

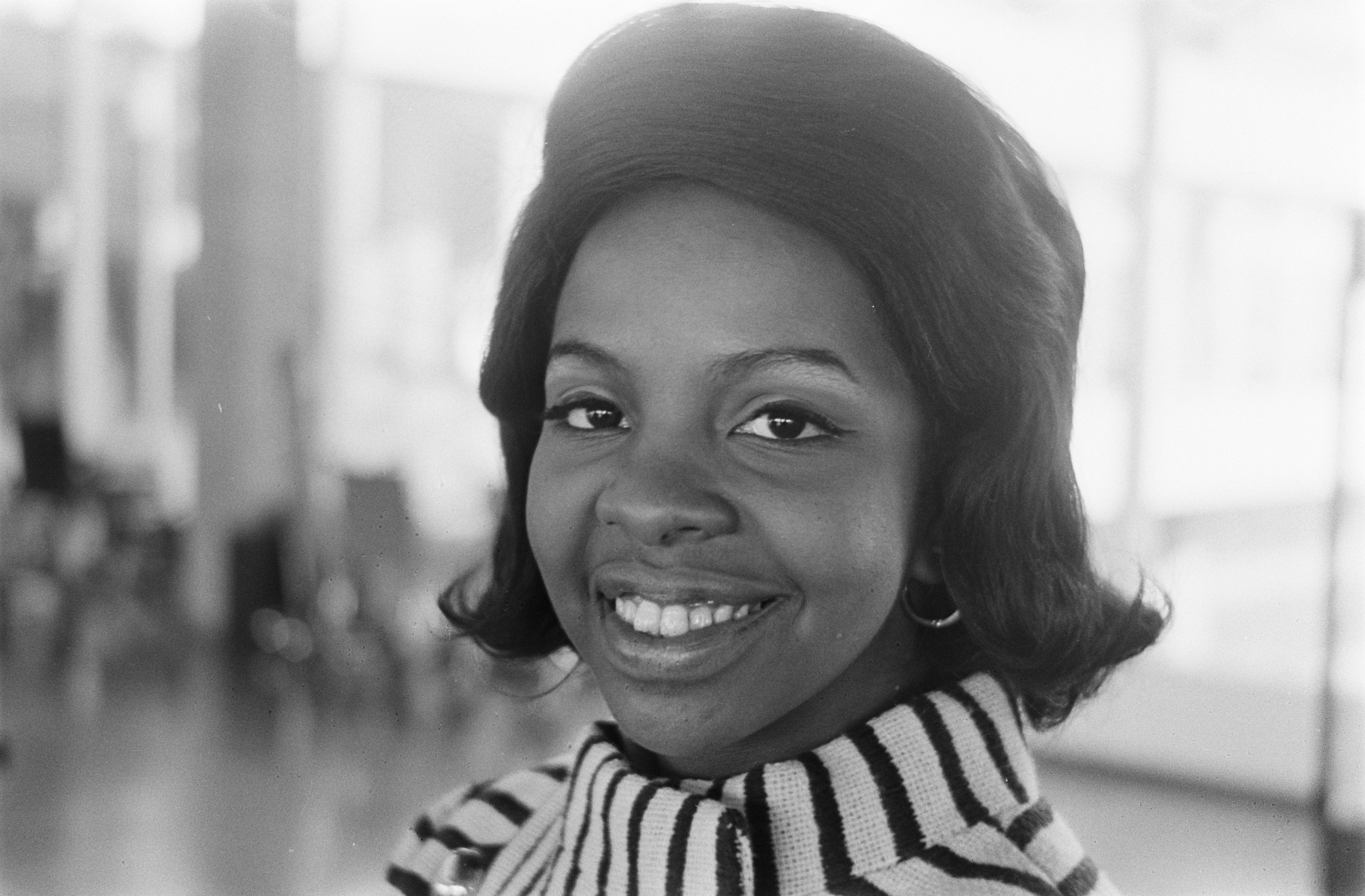
Gladys Knight (born 1944), an American soul singer, pictured in 1969.

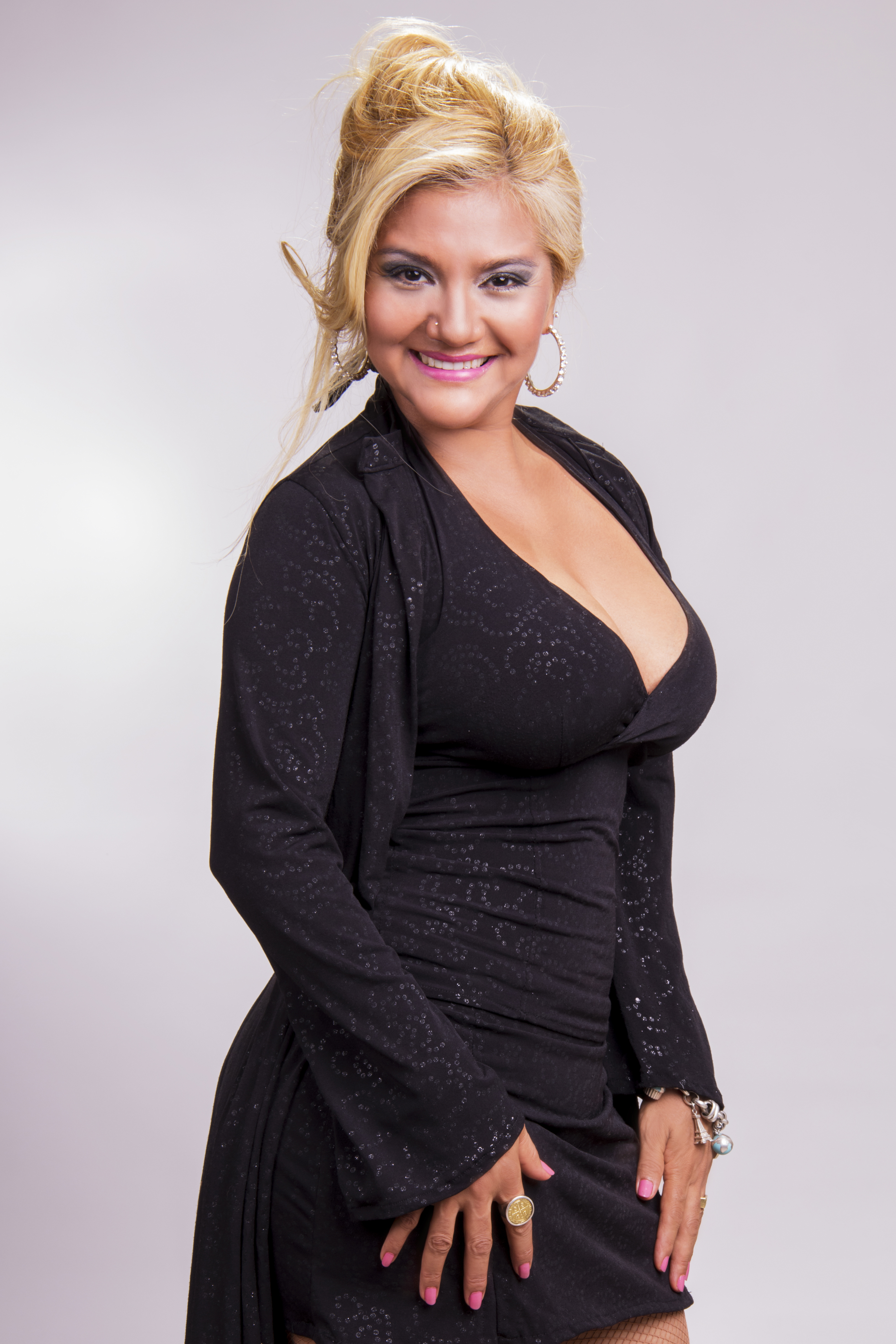
Argentinean singer Gladys Jiménez (born 1965), who performs under the stage name Gladys, la Bomba Tucumana, in 2014.

Gladys (or, alternately, Gladis) is a female given name from the Welsh name Gwladus or Gwladys, which is of uncertain meaning. It was the name of Gwladys, a Welsh queen who lived in the late 5th century and early 6th century and became a Christian saint. The name was also used for other Welsh noblewomen, but declined in use in Wales after 1500.

The name was used mainly by Welsh nationalists in the mid-1800s. It was popularized in the late 1800s in the Anglosphere after it was used for the heroine of the historical romance novel Gladys of Harlech by Louisa M. Spooner in 1858, for the heroine of the romance novel Gladys the Reaper by Anne Beale in 1860, and a decade later for the idealized romantic heroine Gladys Gerant in the 1870 novel Puck by Ouida. The name was considered pretty, exotic, and unlike other names in use at the time. It has sometimes been regarded as the Welsh form of the name Claudia, though that association has been debated. The name was at the height of its popularity in English-speaking countries at the end of the 19th century and the early years of the 20th century, but then declined in usage in some countries. An increase in usage after 1990 is associated with the popularity of Argentinean singer Gladys Nelly del Carmen Jiménez, who performs under the stage name Gladys, la Bomba Tucumana. The name was also well-used in African and South American countries and elsewhere in the middle and late 20th century.

Other feminine names ending in the letter s were also in vogue in the late 19th and early 20th centuries. Some sources have also noted the similarity in sound between Gladys and the etymologically unrelated words glad and gladiolus flower. The name has also often been associated with the gladiolus.

== People ==
- Berniece Inez Gladys Baker Miracle (1919–2014), American writer and half-sister of actress Marilyn Monroe
- Gladys Adda (1921–1995), Tunisian communist and activist
- Gladys Afamado (1925–2024), Uruguayan visual artist, engraver, and poet
- Gladys Aller (1915–1970), American painter
- Gladys Ambrose (1930–1998), English actress
- Gladys Anderson, New Zealand artist
- Gladys Anoma (1930–2006), Ivorian scientist and politician
- Gladys Anslow (1892–1969), American physicist
- Gladys Arnold (1905–2002), Canadian journalist
- Gladys Asmah (1939–2014), Ghanaian politician
- Gladys Aylward (1902–1970), English missionary to China
- Gladys Elizabeth Baker (1908–2007), American mycologist
- Gladys Marguerite Baker (1889–1974), British portrait painter
- Gladys Pearl Baker (1902–1984), American film editor, mother of actress Marilyn Monroe and writer Berniece Baker Miracle
- Gladys Baldwin (1937–1982), Peruvian sports shooter
- Gladys E. Banks (1897–1972), American politician
- Gladys H. Lent-Barndollar (1872–1938), American stenographer, advertiser
- Gladys Barron (née Logan) (1894–1967), English sculptor and painter
- Gladys Beckwith (1929–2020), American women's studies academic
- Gladys Bentley (1907–1960), American blues singer, pianist and entertainer
- Gladys Berejiklian (born 1970), Australian politician. 45th Premier of New South Wales.
- Gladys Bissonette, Native American tribal leader
- Gladys Black (1909–1998), American ornithologist and writer
- Gladys Blake (1910–1983), American actress
- Gladys Block, American nutritionist
- Gladys Bokese (born 1981), Congolese footballer
- Gladys Boot (1890–1964), British actress
- Gladys Bowles (1917–2009), American sociologist and demographer
- Gladys Kamakakuokalani Brandt (1906–2003), educator and civic leader in Hawaii
- Gladys Brandao (born 1991), Panamanian actress
- Gladys Brockwell (1894–1929), American actress
- Gladys Bustamante (1912–2009), Jamaican activist
- Gladys Calthrop (1894–1980), British scenic designer
- Gladys Cardiff (born 1942), American author
- Gladys Carmagnola (1939–2015), Paraguayan poet
- Gladys Carrion, American researcher and administrator
- Gladys Hasty Carroll (1904–1999), American fiction writer
- Gladys Campbell (1892–1992), American writer
- Gladys Carson (1903–1987), British swimmer
- Gladys Casely-Hayford (1904–1950), Gold Coast–born Sierra Leonean writer
- Gladys Castelvecchi (1922–2008), Uruguayan poet
- Gladys Cherry (1881–1965), a survivor of the sinking of the RMS Titanic
- Gladys Clark (1918–2011), Cajun spinner and weaver
- Gladys Colton (1909–1986), English schoolteacher and educationist
- Gladys J. Commons (born 1948), American government official
- Gladys Cooper (1888–1971), English actress
- Gladys Cooper (1899–1975), British artist
- Gladys Victoria "Terrie" Davis (née Anthony) (1919–1991), Canadian baseball player
- Gladys Davis (1893–1965, British fencer and Olympian
- Gladys Rockmore Davis (1901–1967), American artist
- Gladys del Estal (1956–1979), killed Basque ecologist activist
- Gladys del Pilar (born 1967), Swedish singer
- Gladys Dick (1881–1963), American microbiologist
- Gladys Dickason (1903–1971), American labor economist
- Gladys Doyle, Papua New Guinea international lawn bowler
- Gladys Rankin Drew (1870–1914), American comedian
- Gladys Egan (1900–1985), American child actress
- Gladys Ejomi (died 2020), Cameroonian physician
- Gladys Elphick (1904–1988), Australian activist
- Gladys Anderson Emerson (1903–1984), American historian, biochemist and nutritionist
- Gladys Erbetta (1928–2026), Argentine sprinter
- Gladys Ewart (1892–1957), Canadian pianist
- Gladys Fairbanks (1892–1958), American silent film actress
- Gladys Frazin (1900–1939), American stage and film actress
- Gladys Foster, several people
- Gladys Gale (1891–1948), American singer
- Gladys George (1904–1954), American actress
- Gladys Gillem (1920–2009), American professional wrestler
- Gladys Esther Tormes González (born 1933), Puerto Rican historian
- Gladys Goodall (1908–2015), New Zealand photographer
- Gladys Gregory (1899–1981), British actuary
- Gladys Guaipo, (born 1954), Venezuelan politician
- Gladys Guevarra (born 1977), Filipino actress and comedian
- Gladys Gunzer (1939–2016), American sculptor
- Gladys Hain (1887–1962), Australian lawyer, activist, and journalist
- Gladys Hall (1891–1977), American journalist
- Gladys Hansen (1925–2017), American archivist
- Gladys Hanson (1884–1973), American stage and silent film actress
- Gladys Fries Harriman (1896–1983), American philanthropist, equestrian and big game hunter
- Gladys Heldman (1922–2003), American sports journalist
- Gladys Henson (1897–1982), Irish actress
- Gladys Hill (died 1981), screenwriter
- Gladys Holmes (1892–1969), American women's rights and education activist in Boston
- Gladys Hooper (1903–2016), English supercentenarian
- Gladys Horton (1945–2011), American singer
- Gladys Hulette (1896–1991), American actress
- Gladys Ingle (1899–1981), American pilot, wing walker, and aerial stunt team member
- Gladys Jayawardene (died 1989), Sri Lankan physician and academic
- Gladys Jennings (1903–1994), British actress
- Gladys Johnsen (born 1942), American politician
- Gladys Johnston (née Foster) (1906–1983), Canadian painter
- Gladys Kahaka, Namibian biochemist
- Gladys Kessler (1938–2023), American judge
- Gladys Kipkemoi (born 1986), Kenyan runner
- Gladys Kipsoi, Kenyan long-distance runner
- Gladys Kirk (1903–1974), American politician
- Gladys Knight (born 1944), American singer and actress
- Gladys Landaverde (born 1990), Salvadoran runner
- Gladys Leslie (1899–1976), American actress
- Gladys Li (born 1948), Hong Kong politician and lawyer
- Gladys Liu (born 1964), Australian politician
- Gladys Lundwe (born 1964), Zambian politician
- Gladys Maccabe (1918–2018), British artist
- Gladys Mackenzie (1903–1972), Scottish physicist
- Gladys Malvern (1897–1962), American actress and writer
- Gladys Marín (1941–2005), Chilean activist and political figure
- Gladys Olebile Masire (1932–2013), Botswana teacher and political figure
- Gladys McCoy (1928–1993), American politician
- Maria Gladys Mello da Sulva (born 1939), Brazilian actress known as Maria Gladys
- Gladys Mgudlandlu (1917–1979), South African artist and educator
- Gladys Midgley (1905–2011), British singer
- Gladys Milligan (1892–1973), American painter
- Gladys Mitchell (1901–1983), British writer
- Gladys Moncrieff (1892–1976), Australian singer
- Gladys Morcom (1918–2010), British swimmer
- Gladys Morrell (1888–1969), Bermudian suffragette leader
- Gladys Nasikanda (born 1978), Kenyan volleyball player
- Gladys Nederlander, American theatre producer
- Gladys Nicholls (1906–1981), Australian Aboriginal activist
- Gladys Nilsson (born 1940), American artist
- Gladys Nordenstrom (1924–2016), American composer
- Gladys O'Connor (1903–2012), British-Canadian actress
- Gladys Oyenbot, Ugandan actress
- Gladys Milton Palmer (1884–1952), Sarawak princess
- Gladys Parker (1910–1966), American cartoonist
- Gladys Lomafu Pato (born 1930), Swazi short story writer, teacher and lecturer
- Gladys Peto (1890–1977), English artist, fashion designer, illustrator and writer of children's books
- Gladys Mills Phipps (1883–1970), American racehorse owner
- Mary Pickford, born Gladys Smith (1892–1979), Canadian actress, producer, screenwriter and film studio founder
- Gladys Pidgeon (1906–2002), New Zealand swimmer
- Gladys Pizarro, American music executive
- Gladys María Bejerano Portela (born 1947), Vice President of the Council of State of Cuba
- Gladys Portugues (born 1957), American professional bodybuilder and actress
- Gladys Powers (1899–2008), British centenarian
- Gladys "Patsy" Pulitzer (1928–2011), American model, socialite and philanthropist
- Gladys Pyle (1890–1989), American politician
- Gladys Presley (1912–1958), mother of Elvis Presley
- Gladys Ravenscroft (1888–1960), British amateur golfer
- Gladys Reeves (1890–1974), photographer
- Gladys Reichard (1893–1955), American anthropologist and linguist
- Gladys Requena (born 1952), Venezuelan politician
- Gladys Reyes (born 1978), Filipina actress
- Gladys Reynell (1881–1956), Australian painter and ceramicist
- Gladys H. Reynolds, American statistician
- Gladys Ripley (1908–1955), British opera singer
- Gladys Roberts (c. 1887/1888–1975), English suffragette
- Gladys A. Robinson (born 1949), American politician
- Gladys Rodríguez (born 1943), Puerto Rican actress, comedian, and television host
- Gladys Roldan-de-Moras, Mexican-American artist
- Gladys Root (1905–1982), American criminal defense attorney
- Gladys Roy (1896–1927), American wing walker, barnstormer, and film actress
- Gladys W. Royal (1926–2002) chemist
- Gladys Savary (1893–1985), American relief worker
- Gladys Schmitt (1909–1972), American writer
- Gladys Shelley (1911–2003), American composer
- Gladys Skillett (1918–2010), British nurse in World War II
- Gladys Smuckler Moskowitz (1928–2024), singer and composer
- Gladys Spellman (1918–1988), U.S. Congresswoman
- Gladys Spencer-Churchill, Duchess of Marlborough (1881–1977), French-American aristocrat and socialite
- Gladys Staines (born c. 1951), Christian missionary in India
- Gladys Bronwyn Stern (1890–1973), British writer
- Gladys Eleanor Guggenheim Straus, nutritionist
- Gladys Strum (1906–2005), Canadian politician
- Gladys Swain (1945–1993), French psychiatrist
- Gladys Swarthout (1900–1969), American singer
- Gladys Vanderbilt Széchenyi (1886–1965), American heiress and wife of Count László Széchenyi
- Gladys Taber (1899–1980), American writer
- Gladys Tantaquidgeon (1899–2005), Native American anthropologist
- Gladys Tantoh (born 1975), Cameroonian movie entrepreneur and executive
- Gladys Taylor (born 1953), retired British sprinter and Olympian
- Gladys Taylor (1917–2015), Canadian writer and publisher
- Gladys Tejeda (born 1985), Peruvian distance runner
- Gladys Thayer (1886–1945), American painter
- Gladys Triana, Cuban-American artist
- Gladys Triveño (born 1969), Peruvian lawyer
- Gladys Turquet-Milnes (1887/88–1977), British linguist
- Gladys Buchanan Unger (c. 1884 or 1885–1940) American writer
- Gladys Vergara (1928–2016), Uruguayan astronomer
- Gladys Chai von der Laage (born 1953), German sports photographer
- Gladys Waddingham (1900–1997), American writer
- Gladys "Skeeter" Werner Walker (1933–2001), American alpine ski racer and Olympian
- Gladys Walton (1903–1993), American actress
- Gladys Wamuyu (born 1972), Kenyan athlete
- Gladys Wanga (born 1981), Kenyan politician
- Gladys West (1930–2026), American mathematician
- Gladys Widdiss (1914–2012), American Wampanoag tribal elder, Wampanoag historian and potter
- Gladys Willems (born 1977), Belgian archer
- Gladys Wood (1916–2017), American educator and academic administrator
- Gladys Wynne (1876–1968), Irish painter
- Gladys Yang (1919–1999), Sino-British translator
- Gladys Yelvington (1891–1957), American composer
- Gladys Zender (born 1939), Peruvian model and beauty queen

== Fictional characters ==
- Gladys Adams, character in the soap opera Home and Away
- Gladys the Cow, a character on Sesame Street
- Gladys Kravitz, a character in the TV show Bewitched
- GLaDOS (real name, Caroline), head of Aperture Science and main antagonist of the video games Portal 1 and 2.

== See also ==
- GLADIS, a character from the cartoon series Totally Spies!
- Gwladus Ddu (died 1254), Welsh noblewoman, daughter of Llywelyn the Great of Gwynedd
- Gwladys (disambiguation)
- Gladice Keevil
- Gladyce Kachope
