= Gwladys (disambiguation) =

Saint Gwladys ferch Brychan or St Gladys (Latin-Claudia), was the beautiful Queen of Saint Gwynllyw Milwr.

Gwladys is also the name of:

- Gwladys ferch Dafydd (died 1300s), Welsh noblewoman, daughter of Dafydd ap Gruffudd
- Gwladys ferch Dafydd Gam (died 1454), Welsh noblewoman, wife of Roger Vaughan and William ap Thomas
- Gwladys Beckett (1897–1943) who became Lady Charles Markham and then Gwladys, Lady Delamere
- Gwladys Épangue (born 1983), French taekwondo athlete
- Gwladys Evan Morris (fl. 1929), British actress and writer
- Gwladys F. Hughes (1907–1996), American educator and folklorist
- Gwladys Nocera (born 1975), French golfer
- Gwladys Robinson, Marchioness of Ripon

== See also ==
- Gwladus Ddu (died 1254), Welsh noblewoman, daughter of Llywelyn the Great of Gwynedd
- Gladys (disambiguation)
- Gladys (given name)
