= LJW =

LJW or ljw may refer to:

- League of Jewish Women, a voluntary Jewish women's service organisation in the United Kingdom
- LEGO Jurassic World
- ljw, the ISO 639-3 code for Yirandhali language, Queensland, Australia
