= Gladys =

Gladys may refer to:

- Gladys (given name), people with the given name Gladys
- Gladys (album), a 2013 album by Leslie Clio
- Gladys (film), 1999 film written and directed by Vojtěch Jasný
- Gladys, Virginia, United States
- Gladys the Swiss Dairy Cow, a 2002 sculpture of a cow
- Hurricane Gladys (1968)
- Gladys Kalema-Zikusoka, Ugandan scientist
- Talia Gladys, a character in the anime series Gundam Seed Destiny
- the launch name used for USA-215, an American reconnaissance satellite
- a character in the cartoon The Grim Adventures of Billy & Mandy

== See also ==
- Michael Gladis (born 1977), American actor
- GLADIS, a character from the cartoon series Totally Spies!
