= Gladys Taylor =

Gladys Taylor may refer to:

- Gladys Taylor (athlete) (born 1953), British sprinter
- Gladys Taylor (nurse) (1890–1950), Matron-in-Chief, Princess Mary's Royal Air Force Nursing Service
- Gladys Taylor (publisher) (1917–2015), Canadian writer and publisher

== See also ==
- Gladys Tayler
- Gladys (given name)
