= Dorothy Spiers =

English actuary

- Born: Dorothy Beatrice Davis; 25 May 1897; Hackney, London, England
- Died: 2 September 1977 (aged 80); Brent, Middlesex, England
- Occupation: Actuary
- Known for: First British female actuary (shared with Gladys Gregory)

Dorothy Beatrice Spiers (née Davis; 25 May 1897 − 2 September 1977) was a British actuary. She was one of two women to be the first to qualify as an actuary in the United Kingdom (UK). After studying mathematics at Newnham College, Cambridge, she worked for the Guardian Assurance Company. She passed the actuarial exams at the Institute of Actuaries in 1923 with Gladys Gregory.

From the 1940s to 1954, Spiers worked part-time as an actuary for the Guardian Assurance Company, and Eagle Star Insurance. She was also the national treasurer of the League of Jewish Women. Spiers died on 2 September 1977 in Brent, Middlesex.

== Early life and education ==
Dorothy Beatrice Davis was born on 25 May 1897 in Hackney, London, England, to Samuel and Sarah Davis (née Samuel). She was the second of three daughters. Her father Samuel was the headmaster of the Jewish Free School. Her early education was at the Wilton Road School and the City of London School for Girls. She studied mathematics at Newnham College, Cambridge.

== Career ==
After graduation in 1918, Davis worked for the Guardian Assurance Company. While working there, she studied for the actuarial examinations at the Institute of Actuaries, enrolling at the institute in 1920. The institute had unanimously approved the admission of women at their general meeting in the previous year. She passed the exams in 1923 with Gladys Gregory and together they were the first women to qualify as actuaries in the UK. Three years later, Davis became the first woman to open the discussion at a sessional meeting of the Institute of Actuaries. After she had made her contribution, the male actuary who followed commented that "those of them who had advocated the admission of women to the Institute had every reason to congratulate themselves".

== Personal and later life ==
She married Henry Michael Spiers, an industrial chemist, in 1931. Henry had wanted to marry her earlier, but the Guardian Assurance Company at the time had a policy of not employing married women, so she had declined his proposal. After their marriage, she became a housewife, and the couple had two sons. She worked at the Continuous Mortality Investigation division of the Institute of Actuaries between 1932 and 1938. From the 1940s to 1954, Spiers returned to actuarial work on a part-time basis at the Guardian Assurance Company and Eagle Star Insurance. Outside of her actuarial career, she was a member of the council of the League of Jewish Women, and also its national treasurer.

She died on 2 September 1977 at the Central Middlesex Hospital in Brent, Middlesex at the age of 80.
