= Gladys the Swiss Dairy Cow =

Work of public art in the U.S. state of Connecticut

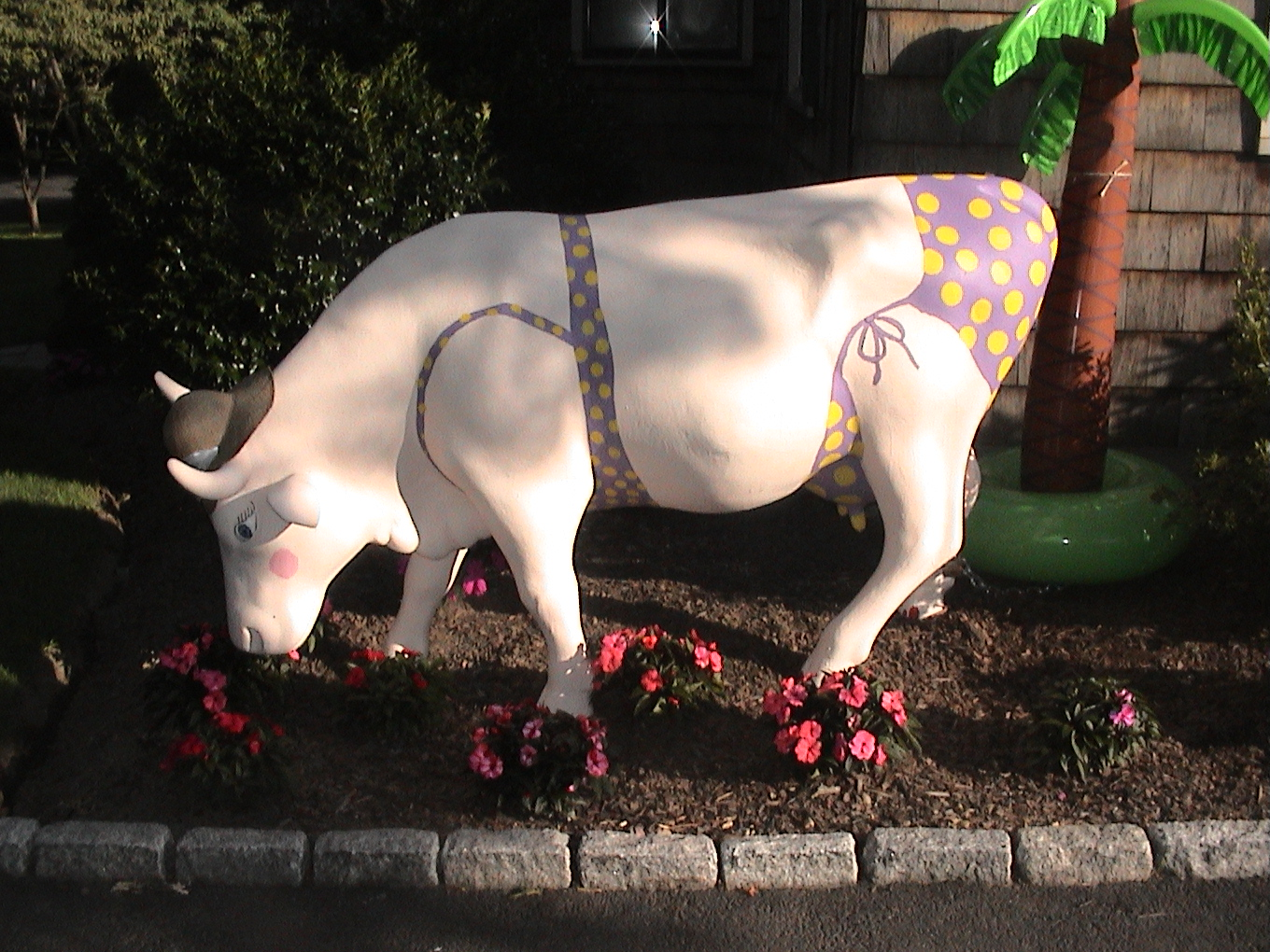
Gladys in July 2003

Gladys the Swiss Dairy Cow, also known simply as "Gladys", is a work of public art in the U.S. state of Connecticut. Gladys was created and is maintained by artist/owner James Lebinski since August 2002. The underlying sculpture is a fiberglass Swiss dairy cow, and is the same shape and size as the famous CowParade cows.

Lebinski has created more than 50 pieces of art using the sculpture by decorating it with paint, cloth, and various other materials for each holiday. Gladys was displayed in Fairfield, Connecticut, from October 2002 until April 2006, and can currently be found in Monroe, Connecticut.

== History ==
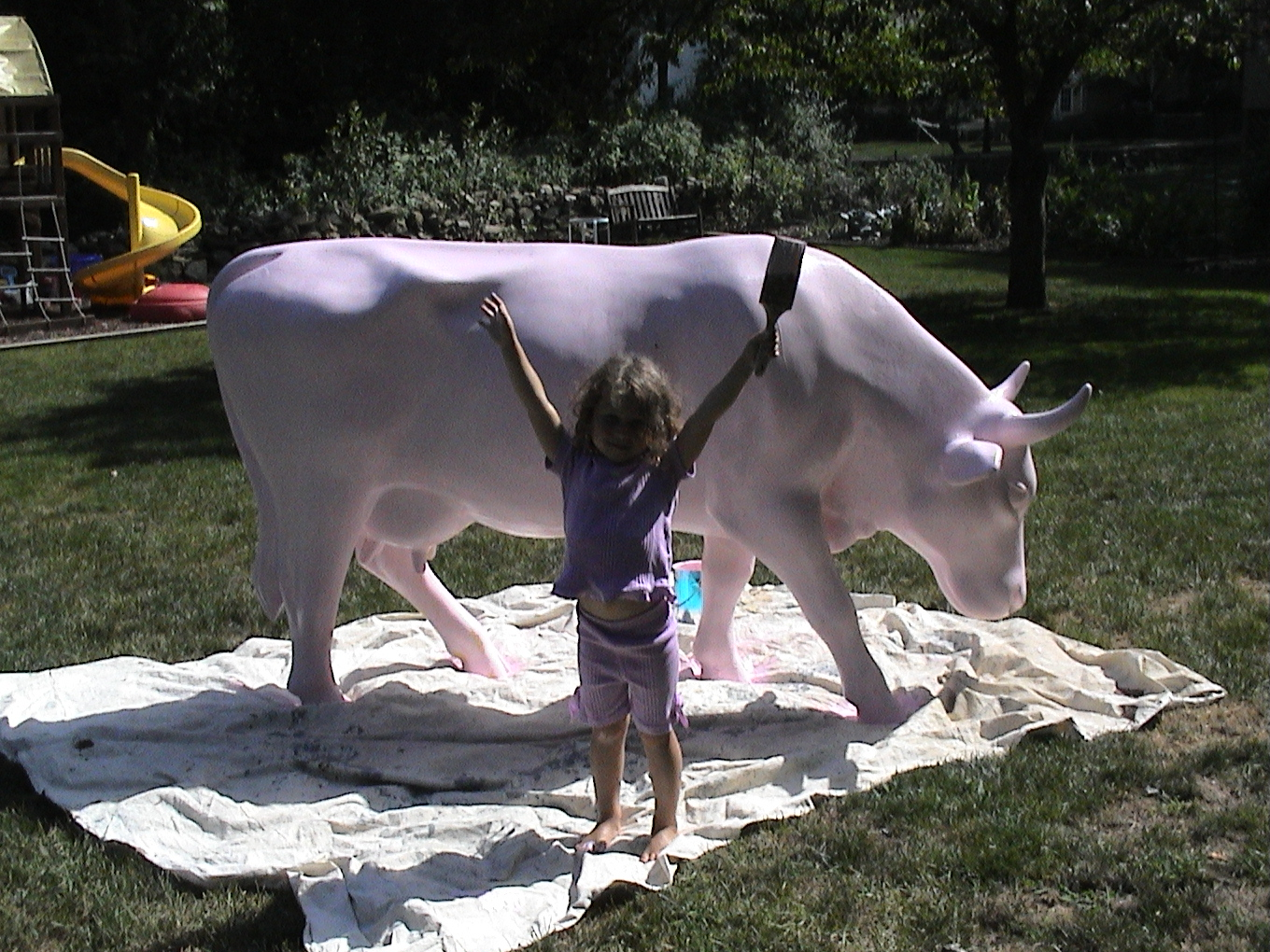
Gladys in pink

In July 2002, Lebinski recovered a fiberglass cow sculpture from a Dumpster in Norwalk, Connecticut. Lebinski repaired the sculpture's smashed body and four broken legs and painted it pink. Gladys was placed on display in Fairfield, Connecticut in August 2002. The sculpture became an object of attention and resulted in suggestions to the artist to create whimsical seasonal designs using the sculpture as a base.

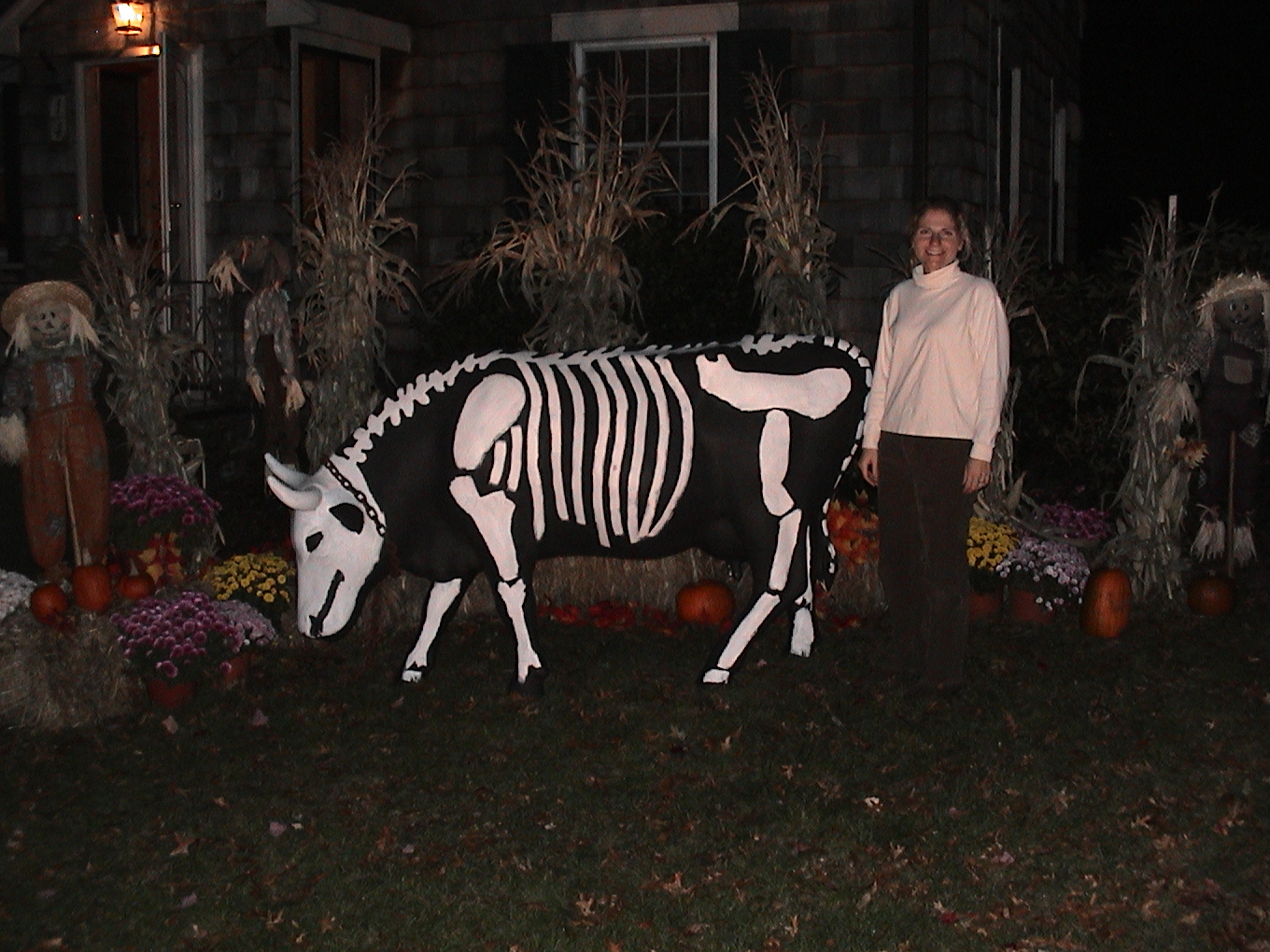
Gladys as a skeleton

In 2002, the first seasonal artwork using the sculpture was titled "Gladys as a Skeleton", and was created for Halloween. A significant amount of public attention was generated by this artwork, and this attention was the genesis of the ongoing project to create holiday-themed art.

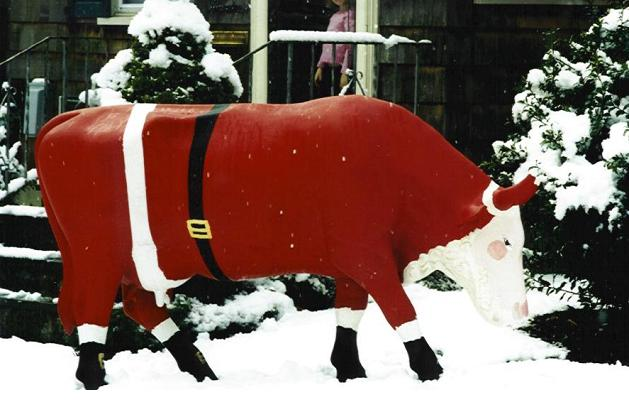
Gladys as Santa Cow

The next piece was created for Christmas 2002. The cow sculpture was painted as Santa Claus and the artwork was titled "Gladys as Santa Cow". These two works gained public attention and generated initial press coverage.

In April 2006, the sculpture was placed on display in Monroe, Connecticut.

== Gallery ==
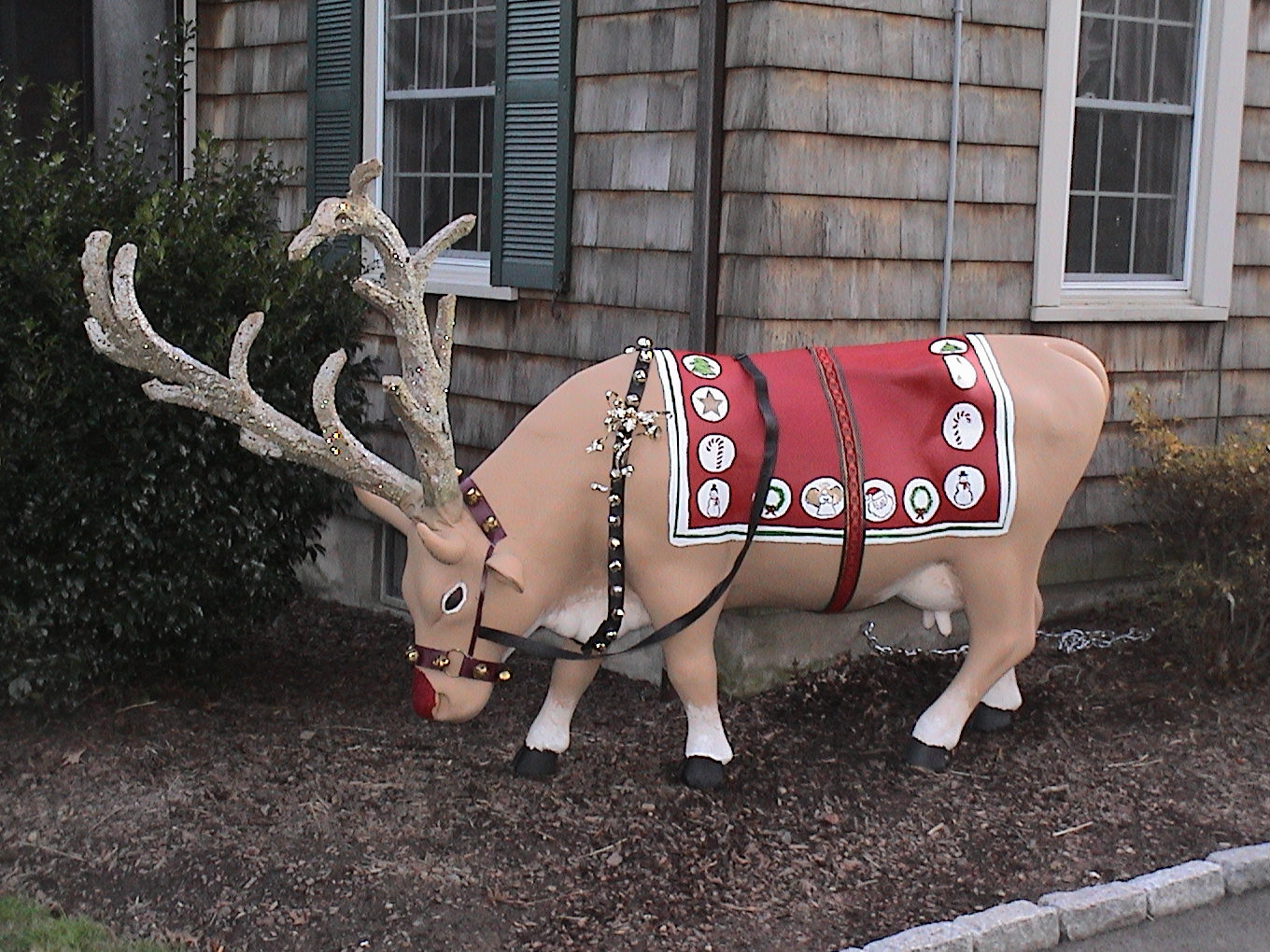
Gladys as a Reindeer.

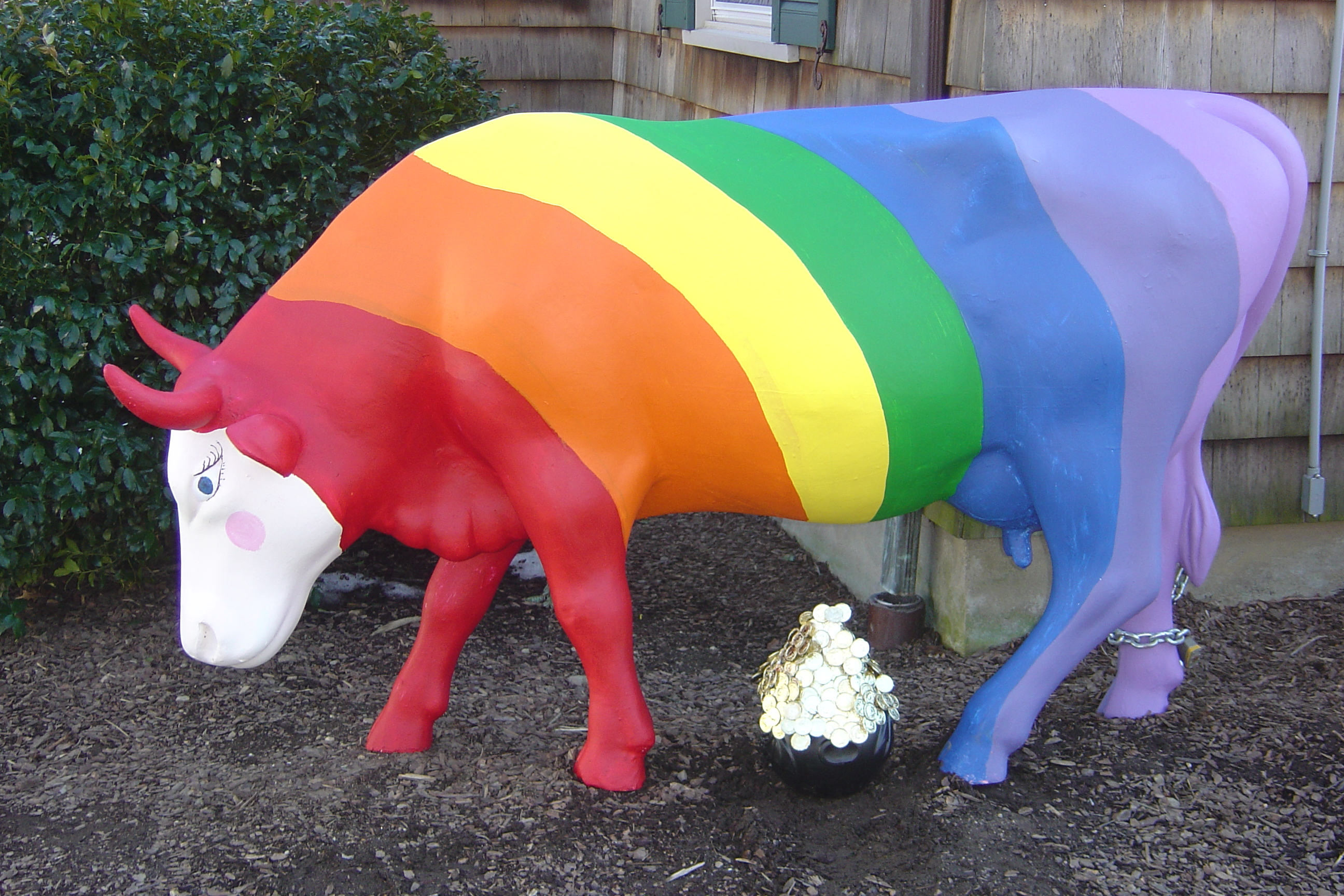
Gladys as a Rainbow.

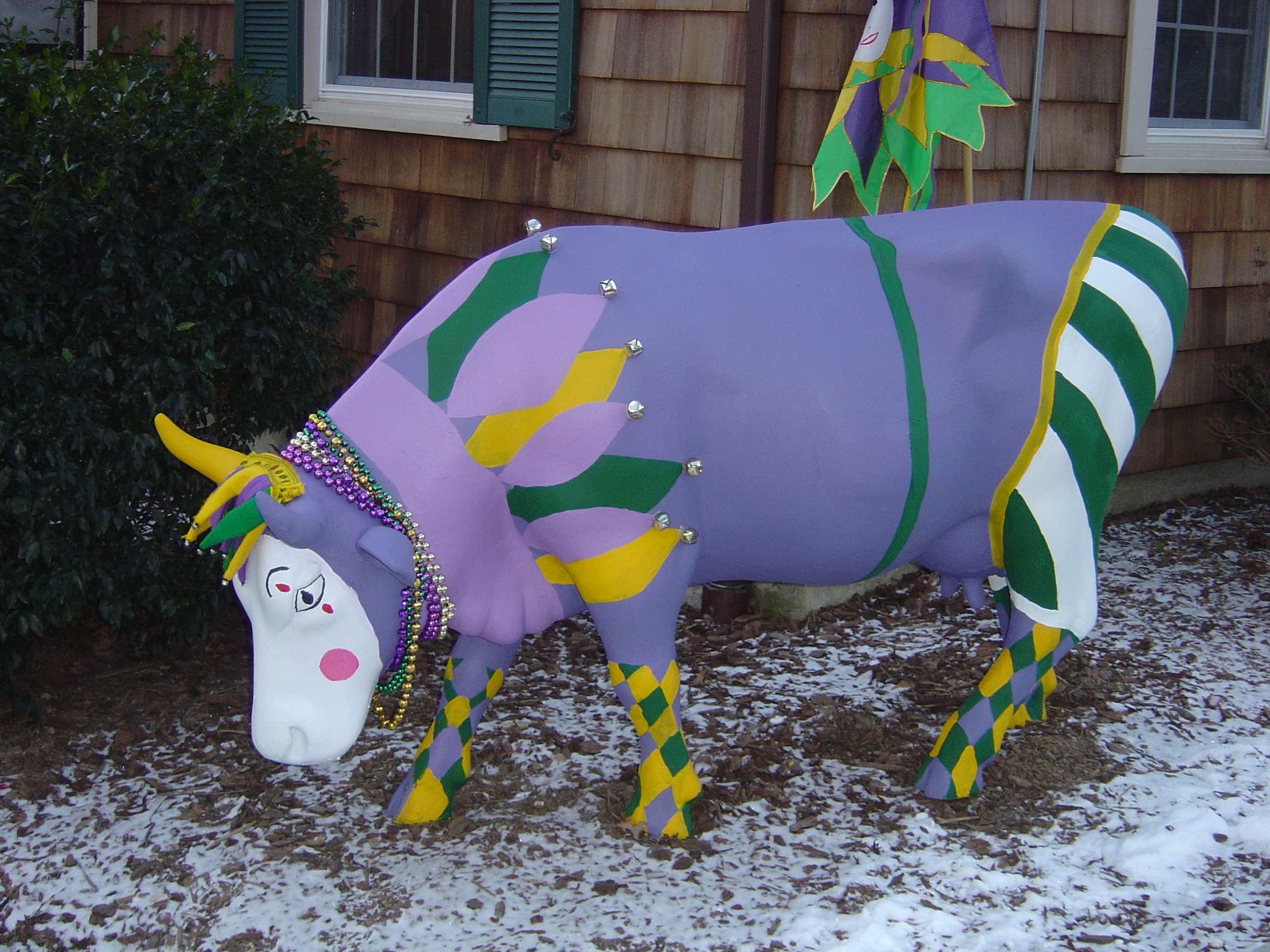
Gladys as a Mardi Gras Jester.

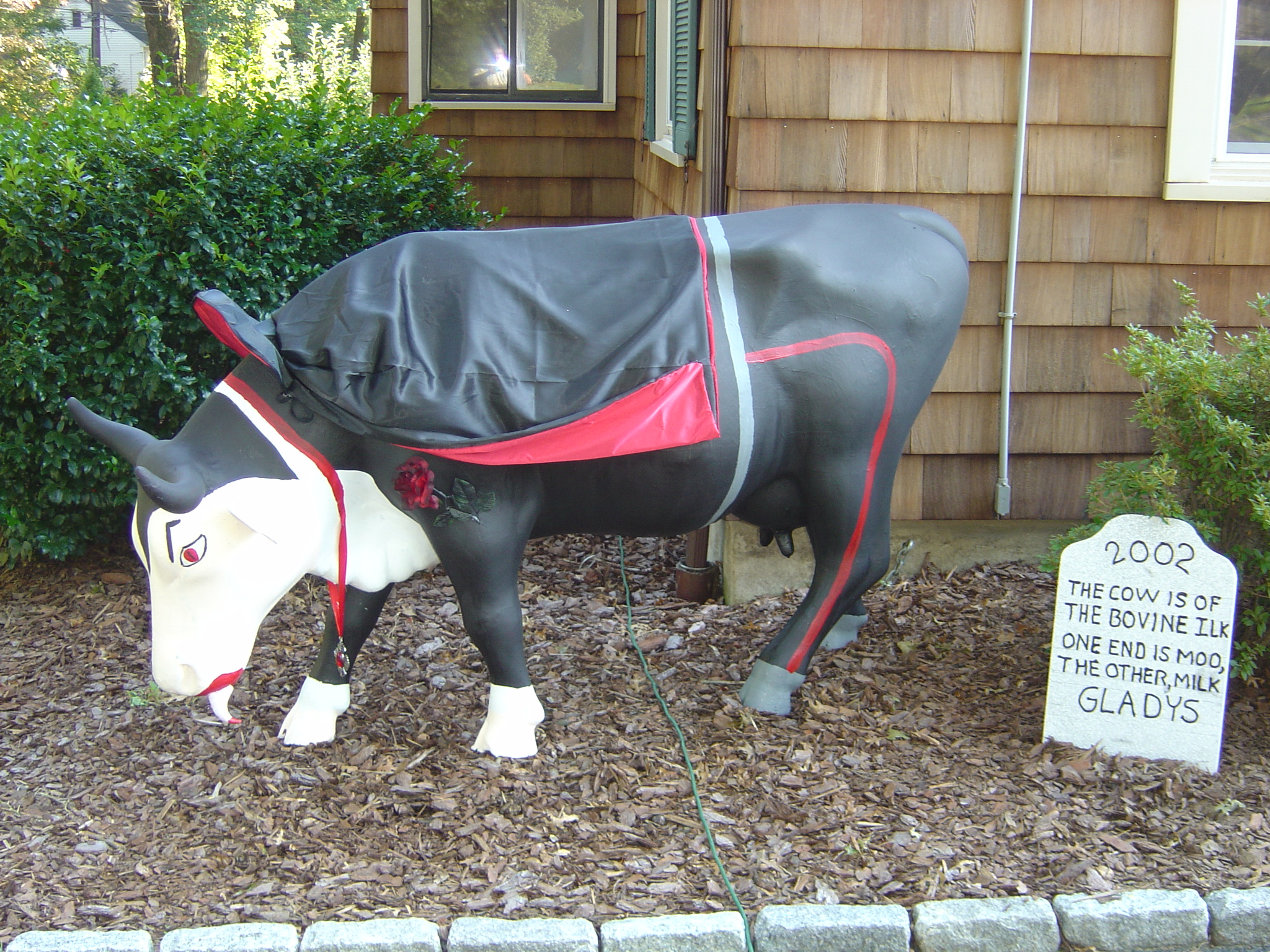
Gladys as Dracula.

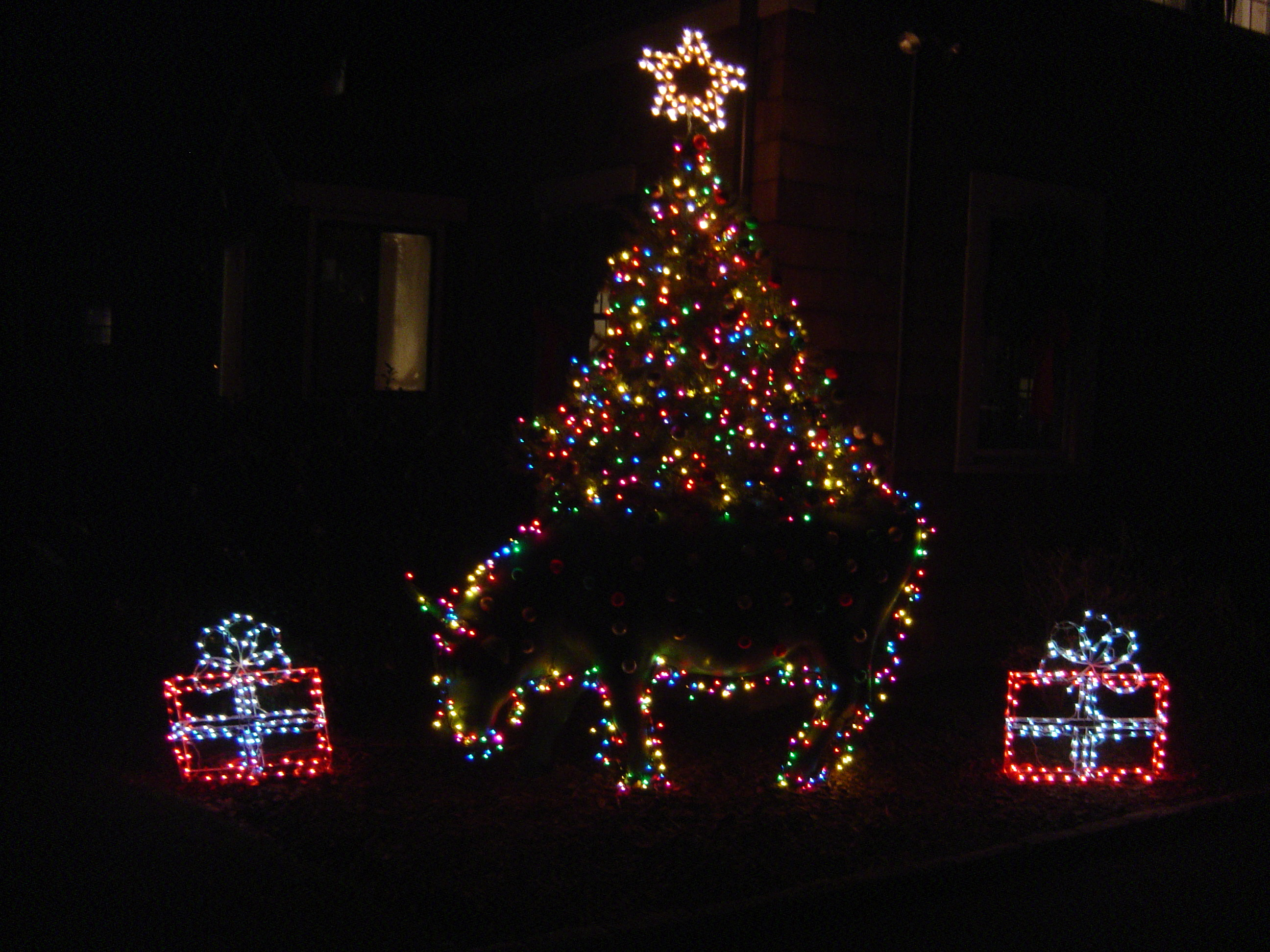
Gladys as a Christmas Tree—Night View.

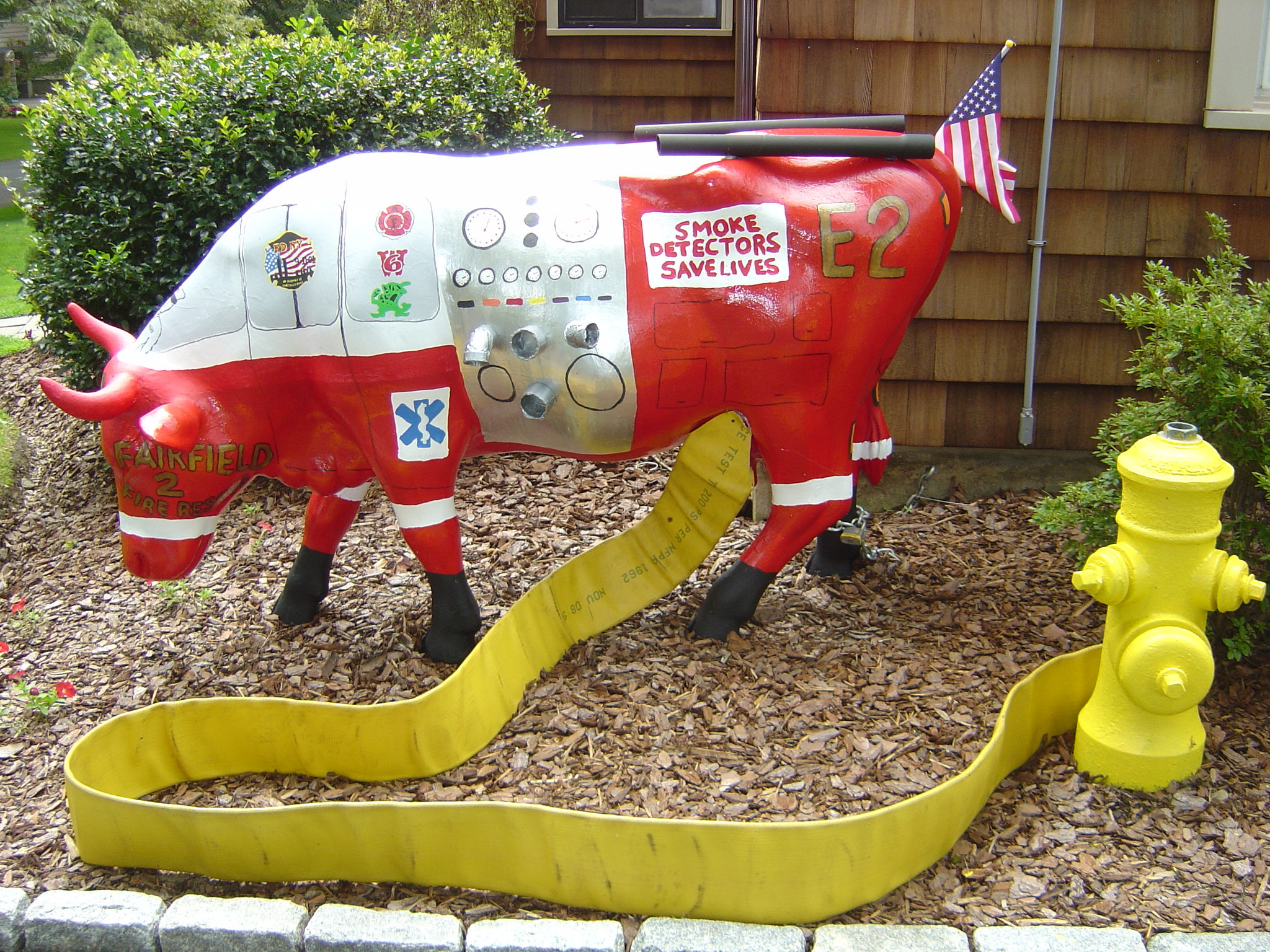
Gladys as Fairfield Fire Department Two.

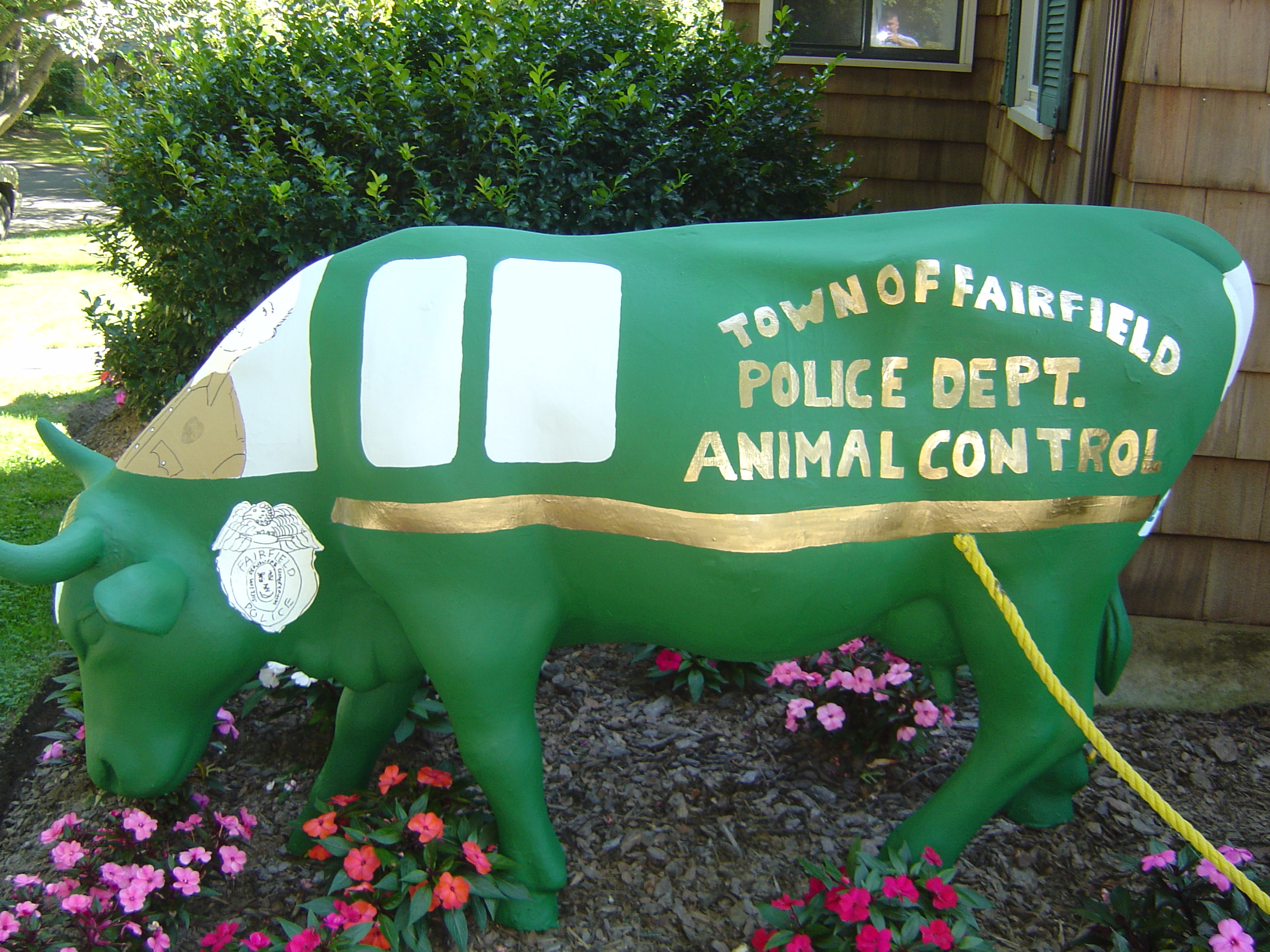
Gladys as Fairfield Police Animal Control.

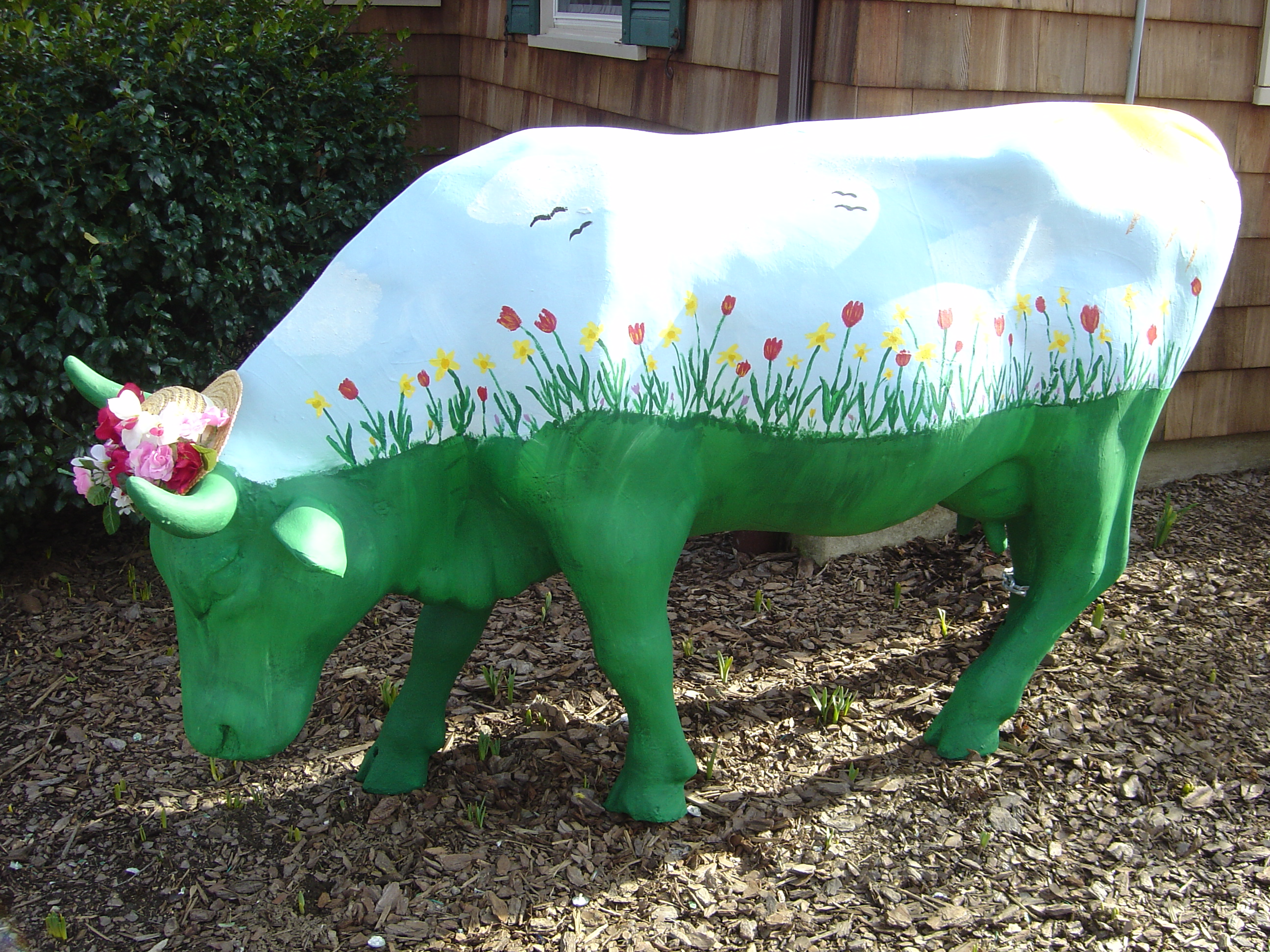
Gladys as a Spring/Easter Scene.

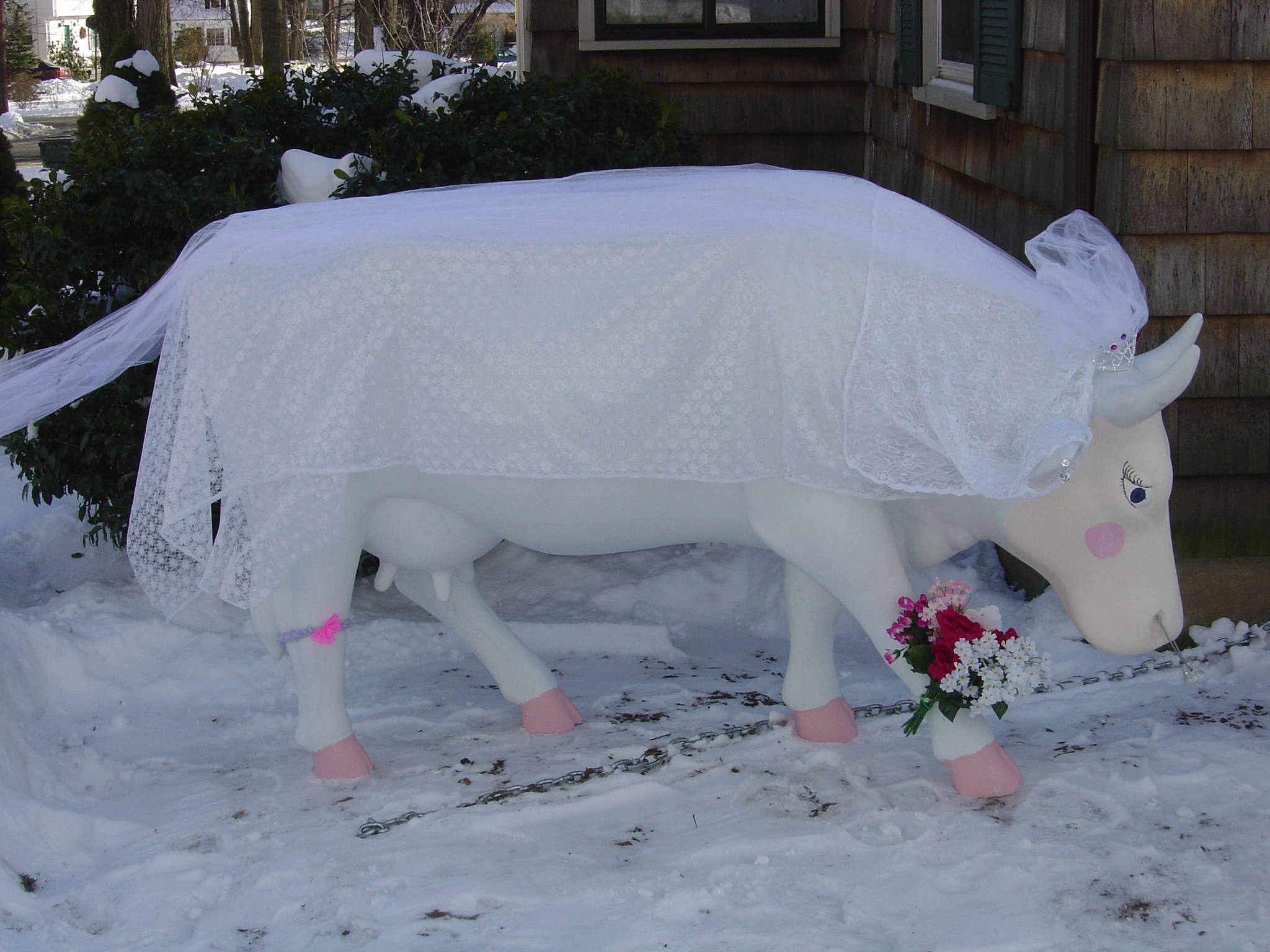
Gladys as a Valentine Bride.

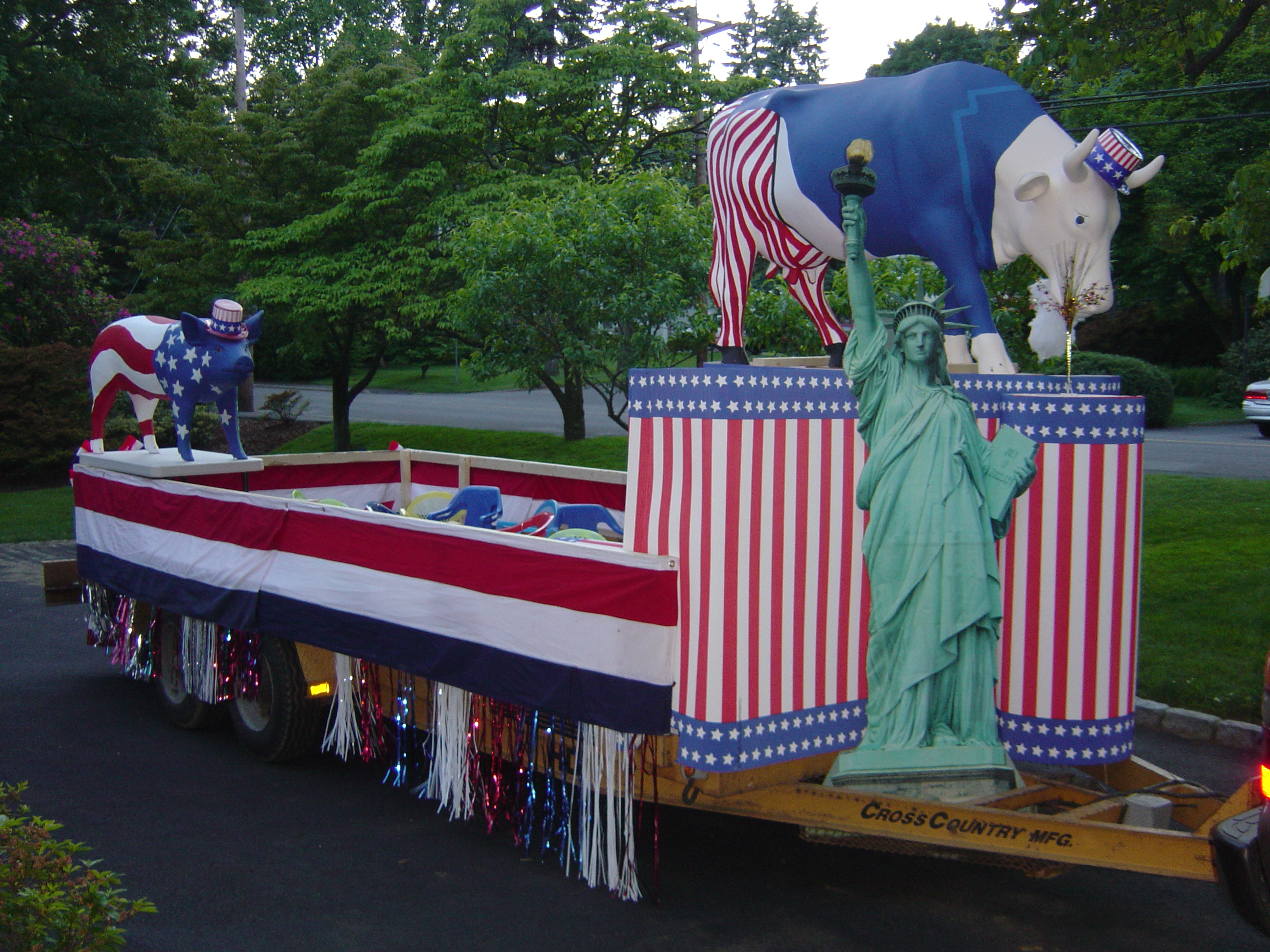
Gladys as an award-winning float in 2005.

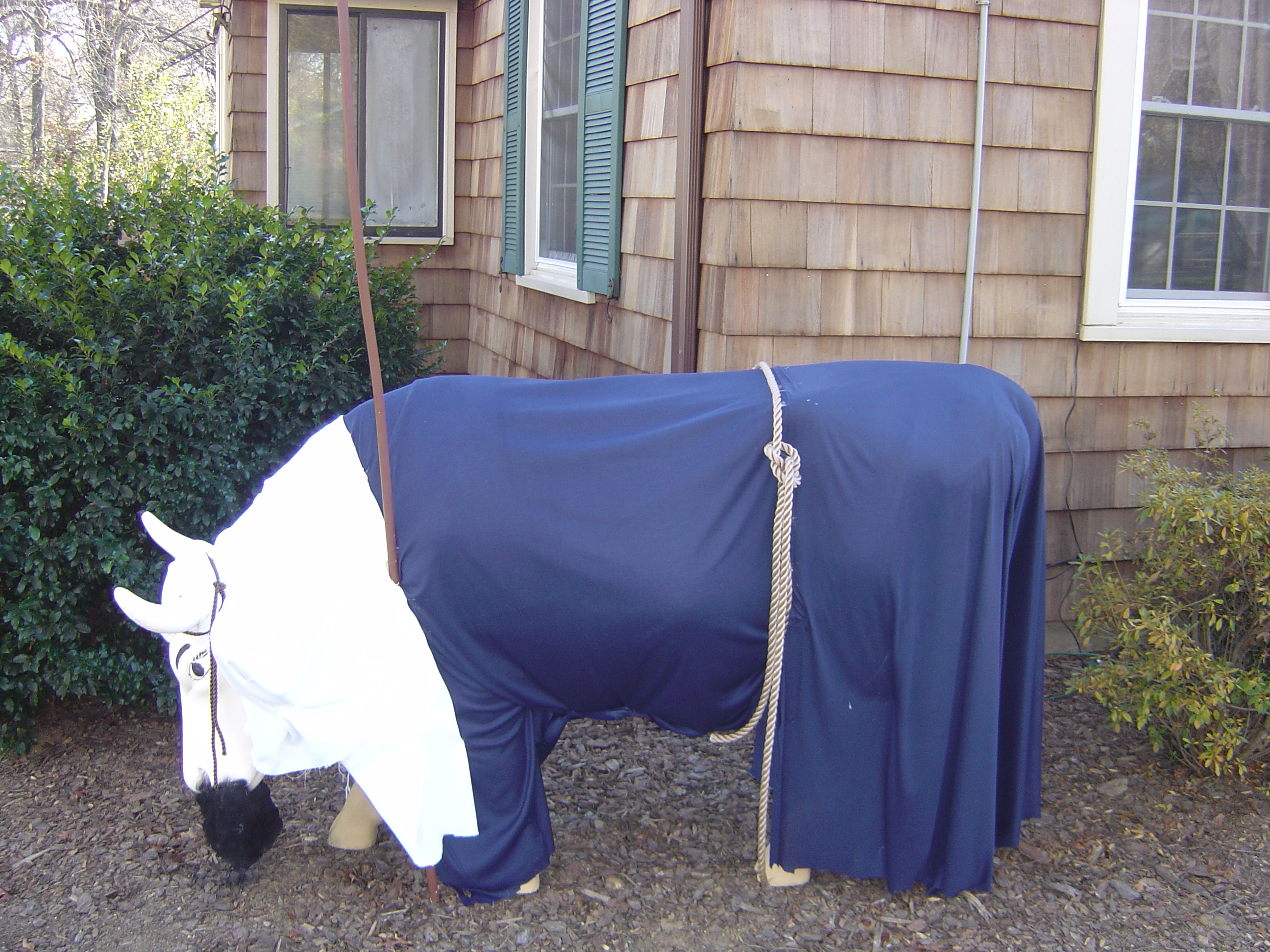
Gladys as a Christmas Shepherd.

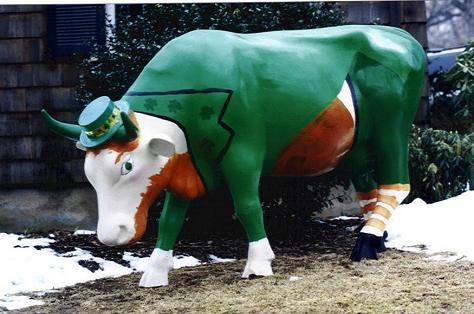
Gladys as a Leprechaun.

== See also ==
- United Buddy Bears
