= Gladys Smuckler Moskowitz =

American singer, composer and teacher (1928–2024)

- Born: January 25, 1928; Philadelphia, Pennsylvania, U.S.
- Died: May 25, 2024 (aged 96)
- Occupations: Composer; singer; educator

Gladys Smuckler Moskowitz (January 25, 1928 – May 24, 2024) was an American singer, composer and teacher. She graduated from Brooklyn College with bachelor's and master's degrees, and worked as a teacher, choir director and composer. As Gladys Young she performed in the United States and Europe as a folk singer. In 2003 her chamber opera The Fountain of Youth, based on Nathaniel Hawthorne's "Dr. Heidegger's Experiment," won a special commendation at the Nancy Van de Vate International Opera Competition for Women. Her music is performed internationally. Moskowitz died on May 24, 2024, at the age of 96.

== Works ==
Moskowitz is known for songs and chamber opera. Selected works include:

- Grass, on a poem by Carl Sandburg
- Chicken Little, The Sky Is Falling! A Satirical Chamber Opera, performed by Bluegrass Chamber Orchestra and Opera, Lexington, Kentucky, 2009.
- More than a Voice
- The Fountain of Youth, chamber opera
- Three Love Songs on Poems of Sara Teasdale: "Joy"; "Advice to a Girl"; "Gifts." Premiere in New York City, 2008.
- Psalm 23, for piano, oboe, cello and voice
- The Masque of the Red Death, music drama in two acts after Poe
- The Buried Life, for mezzo-soprano and piano
- Three Songs of Passion, for piano, flute, cello, and voice; on poems by Cheryl Yuzik
