= Gladys Savary =

Gladys Becker Slaughter, Madame Savary (2 Jun 1893-14 Sep 1985), was an American woman of Manila who labored long and hard to help the starving, neglected, abused, and threatened "internees" at Santo Tomas Internment Camp, supplying them with food every day and performing various other services, such as laundry, communication and monetary assistance, to help ease their hardship. At the same time, she also worked hard to help her servants and friends outside of Santo Tomas survive the Japanese occupation of the Philippines and the 1945 Battle of Manila. Gladys was not incarcerated by the Japanese because, being married to a Frenchman, she was regarded as a citizen of France which by that time had a puppet government aligned with Japan's ally Germany. Gladys also sent help to a POW camp. Several of her activities could have resulted in torture and execution had she been caught. She maintained a diary throughout the Japanese occupation, and made this the basis of her book Outside the Walls.

Living in Pasay, Gladys escaped – barely and unknowingly at the time – the massive, systematic massacre of non-Japanese men, women, and children conducted by the Imperial Japanese Navy 31st Special Base Force (marines), as well as deaths caused by U.S. artillery during the Battle of Manila, especially in Ermita and Malate, just next to Pasay. The estimated toll is around 100,000 killed. Even Germans and French were not spared.

The exploits of Gladys Savary, Yay Panlilio, Claire Phillips, Margaret Utinsky, and Naomi Flores are recounted in Angels of the Underground by Theresa Kaminski.

== Bibliography ==
- Kaminski, Theresa, 2016, Angels of the Underground: the American women who resisted the Japanese in the Philippines in World War II, New York: Oxford University Press, 2016. ISBN 978-0199928248 ISBN 019992824X
- Kaminski, Theresa, 2000, Prisoners in Paradise: American women in the wartime South Pacific, Lawrence, Kansas: University Press of Kansas. ISBN 0-7006-1003-0
- Savary, Gladys, "I Go Now" in Manila Daily Bulletin, March 17, 1949.
- Savary, Gladys, 1954, Outside the Walls, New York: Vantage Press.
