= Gladys Lomafu Pato =

Swazi short story writer (born 1930)

- Born: Gladys Lomafu Dlamini; 1930 (age 95–96); Near Piggs Peak, Swaziland
- Education: University of Swaziland
- Spouse: Petrus Phembuvuyo Pato (m. 1957; died 2010)
- Children: 4
- Writing career
- Notable work: Umtsango (1977)

Gladys Lomafu Pato (born 1930) is a Swazi short story writer, teacher and lecturer.

== Biography ==
She was born Gladys Lomafu Dlamini, near to the town of Piggs Peak in Swaziland in 1930. She was the daughter of a well-known chief who had many cattle and many wives, and was one of the richest Swazis in the land. Her mother was his eighth wife.

On 1 January 1957, she married Petrus Phembuvuyo Pato (1929–2010), who was a Christian pastor like his father, and they had three sons together, and adopted a daughter.

She was studying at Bible College when she met her future husband, and they ran various ministries throughout Swaziland. She became a qualified teacher, and in 1980, earned her bachelor's degree in education from the University of Swaziland. She then worked at William Pitcher Teachers College for eight years as a lecturer, and later taught in a private school in Lilongwe, Malawi, as her husband was the academic dean of Lilongwe Nazarene Bible College there.

Her publications include Umtsango, a 117-page volume of short stories, published by Swaziland Academic Services in 1977.

== Publications ==
- Umtsango (Swaziland Academic Services, 1977)
