= Gladys Kahaka =

Namibian biochemist

- Education: University of Nottingham
- Awards: 2012 Fellow of the L'Oréal-UNESCO Awards for Women in Science
- Scientific career
- Fields: Biochemistry of plants
- Thesis: Analysis of a Putative RNA Methylase Family Member in Arabidopsis thaliana (2010)

Gladys Karirirue Kahaka is a Namibian biotechnologist who was a recipient of the 2012 L'Oréal-UNESCO Awards for Women in Science. She was the first Namibian to receive the award. She studies the genetics and molecular structure of plants.

== Life and work ==
Gladys Kahaka was born in Botswana and moved to Namibia. Kahaka grew up at Gam, Namibia in the Tsumkwe region and completed her schooling at Jakob Marengo Secondary School in Windhoek. After graduation she earned a BSc in biology and chemistry at the University of Namibia with research centered around the preservation of the biological and chemistry resources of Namibia through biotechnology. She went on to complete her doctoral thesis at the University of Nottingham in the United Kingdom aided by the L'Oréal-UNESCO Award, which allowed her to pursue her doctoral research.

In particular, she has identified genes in organisms, leading to a better understanding of their interaction with the environment. She is studying three endangered species: cheetahs, killed by farmers, ximenia, a tree that bears nutritious fruit, and devil's claw, a medicinal plant that is threatened with extinction.

Devil's claw, Harpagophytum, can provide a source of income for poor local farmers in Namibia which is the largest exporter of the medicinal plant. Kahaka, is studying the plants genes so it can be grown responsibly and on a larger scale.

Kahaka was one of the 15 young scientists chosen for the "L'Oréal-UNESCO Prize for Women in Science" annual program. Kahaka is the first Namibian to receive this award.
