= Gladys Triana =

Cuban-American visual artist

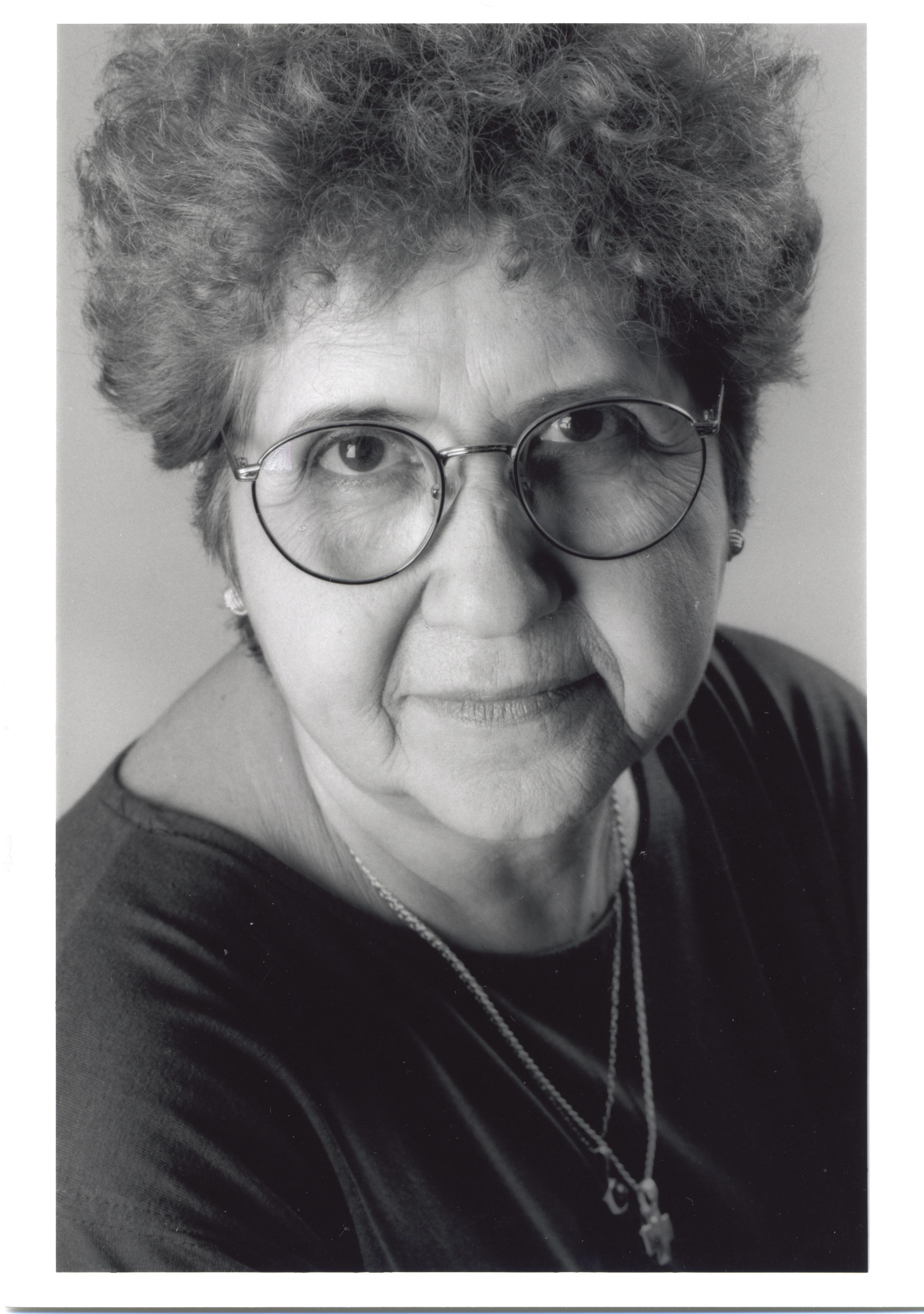
- Portrait of Triana from 2003, taken by Luis Mallo
- Born: November 17, 1937 (age 88); Camagüey, Cuba
- Known for: Visual artist

Gladys Triana is a Cuban-American visual artist. Triana's career as an artist has spanned nearly six decades and includes works on paper, paintings, sculpture, mixed-media collage, installations, and photography. Triana currently resides in New York City and is still actively creating artwork.

== Early life and education ==
Gladys Triana Perez was born to José Daniel Triana and Francisca Maria Perez on November 17, 1937, in Camagüey, Cuba. Triana has two siblings, José Triana, a well-recognized Cuban playwright and poet, and Lyda Elena Triana Perez, an actress who performed in Cuba and Spain, and eventually became a messo singer in the chorus Zarzuela and the Teatro Real, in Madrid.

When she was 6 years old, Triana’s family moved to Bayamo, Cuba for her father’s job, where she attended primary school. She lived in Bayamo until 1959, when she moved to Havana, Cuba. In Havana, Triana worked in the Department of Design at the Instituto Nacional de la Industria Turistica. In 1957, Triana began taking courses in the philosophy department at the University of Santiago de Cuba. In 1969, facing increasing pressure on artists to conform to standards set by government oversight, Triana left Cuba and lived in Madrid, Spain for five years. In Madrid, Triana studied printmaking at the San Fernando University.

In 1974, Triana was invited to exhibit her work in New York City, at Sarduy Gallery. She returned to New York in 1975 and has lived there ever since. Triana completed her B.A. in Education at Mercy College in 1976 and her M.A. in Education at Long Island University in 1977.

== Life and artwork ==
Triana's relationship with art began as a child. During primary school, Triana was captivated by the contrast between light and shadow, and began sketching shadows of objects with charcoal and pencil. At sixteen years old, Triana began to experiment with black, white, and gray oil painting, and by 1955 she began sketching members of her family with colored pencil and charcoal. In addition to visual art, Triana developed a profound interest in music, specifically classical orchestral works, having been exposed to concerts from a young age.

She was inspired by Mario Carreño y Morales, the director of the Museo de Bellas Arte in Havana, when he visited Santiago de Cuba in 1957. During his visit, Carreño selected Triana for her first group exhibition at the Museo de Bellas Artes in Havana, Cuba called “5 Painters from Oriente.” At the age of twenty-one, Triana left Bayamo to live in Havana, where she began to paint on a daily basis and met Eduardo Abela, who would become her mentor. In 1962, and 1963, she was invited to exhibit at the Havana Lyceum. In 1964, Triana’s work was exhibited in a group show at the Museo Nacional de Bellas Artes de La Habana. She continued to exhibit throughout local art centers in Havana until her departure from Cuba in 1969.

Upon moving to Madrid, Triana continued to paint daily. Triana attended San Fernando University’s printmaking program, where she met a group of young artists with whom she would eventually travel throughout Eastern Europe in August 1970. The month-long trip, which departed from Madrid, spanned a number of Italian Renaissance art centers, including Milan, Florence, Rome, Ravenna, Uffizi, and Pompeii. Upon her return, Triana continued to exhibit her work locally in Madrid. In 1974, Triana was invited to exhibit at Sarduy Gallery in New York, and returned to New York in 1975, where she has resided continuously since.

Triana mentions Goya, Rembrandt, and Caravaggio as classical influences on her work, as well as modern artists such as Duchamp, Bacon and works from the Futurism movement. Through various stages in her artistic career, Triana has focused on visual expressions of movement, fragmentation, and transformation. An example of this recurring expression is a series of drawings composed during the late 1980s in homage to women artists such as To Käthe Kollwitz (1987), To Aleksandra Ekster (1988), To Paula Modersohn-Becker (1988), To Gabriela Mistral, and others.

Her artwork includes prints, drawings, collages, works on canvas, photography, installations and videos. Triana’s works have been presented at numerous solo and group exhibitions around the US and abroad.

== Exhibitions ==
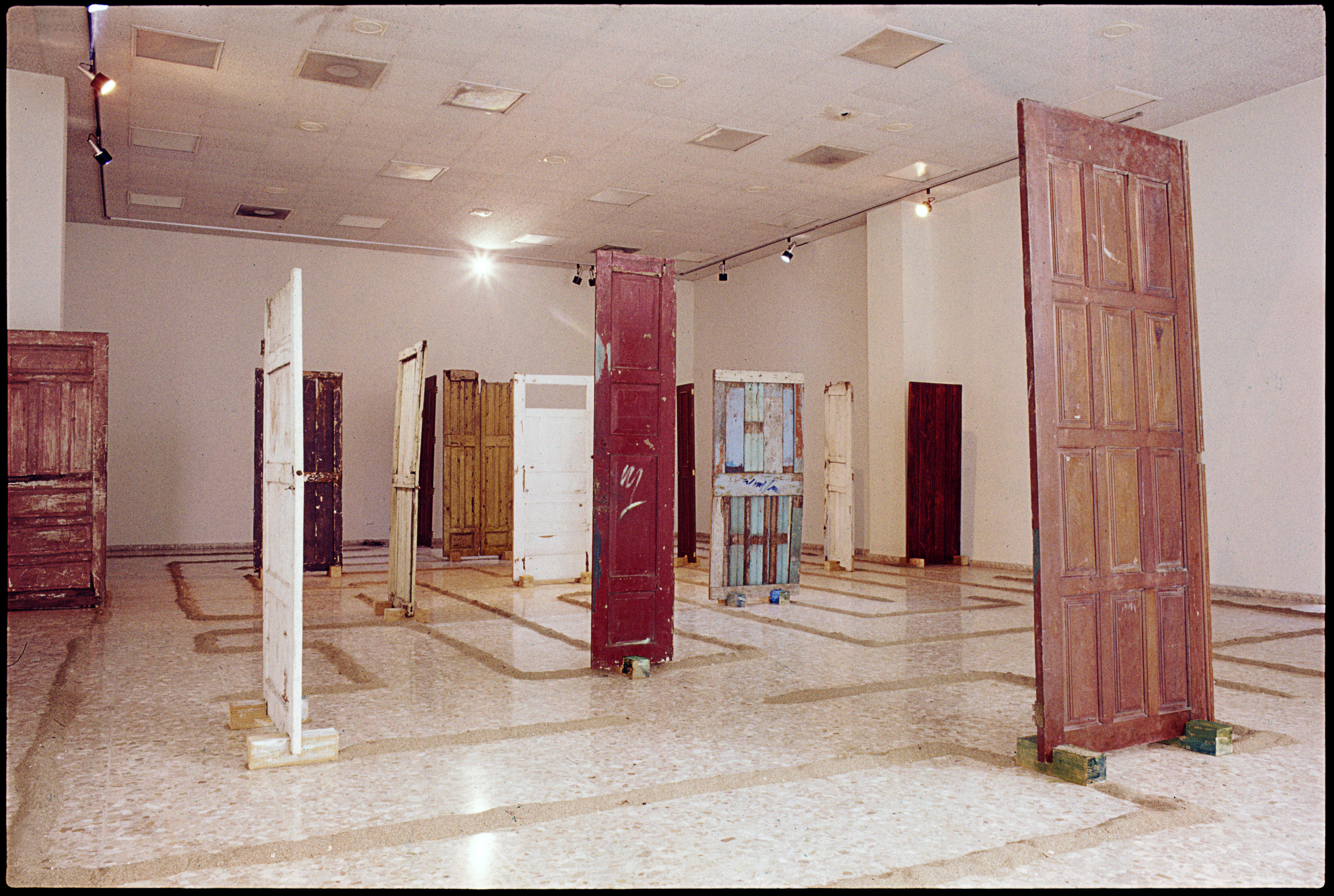
Path to Memory, The Labyrinth. Installation, November 1991. Museum of Modern Art, Santo Domingo.

Triana has been exhibited in numerous solo and group exhibitions across the United States and around the world. Her first exhibition was at the Lyceum in Havana, Cuba, in 1962. Her most recent exhibition, Sharply into a Light Space, was on view during early 2014 at the Point of Contact Gallery at Syracuse University.

Select solo exhibitions include Gladys Triana: Movement Fragmentation, at the Museum of Contemporary Hispanic Art, New York, in 1990; The Path to Memory, the Island, an art installation at The Bronx Museum of Art, in 1995; Cada Vez es Ahora, at the Centro Cultural Recoleta, Buenos Aires, in 2003; and Dibujo en Dos Tiempos, at the Museo Francisco Goitía, Zacatecas, Mexico, in 2006.

Triana has also been a part of many collective exhibitions. In 1972 she participated in the Bienal de Segovia, in Segovia, Spain; Festival Cubano de Arte, Cathedral of St. John the Divine, New York, in 1973; Trends, at the Museum of Contemporary Hispanic Arts, New York, 1983; Sculpture into the 90s: Artists from the Americas, at the Museum of Modern Art of Latin America, Washington, D.C., in 1990; and 9 Cuban American Artists, at the Kingsborough Community College Art Gallery, City University of New York, in New York City, in 1996.

Triana's work is in the permanent collection of The Bronx Museum of the Arts, New York; El Museo del Barrio, New York; El Museo de Arte Moderno, Santo Domingo; El Museo de Bellas Artes, Santiago de Chile; El Museo de la Ciudad, Queretaro, Mexico; Housatonic Museum of Art, Connecticut; The Museum of Art, Fort Lauderdale, Florida; and the ASU Art Museum, Arizona, among others.

Triana was featured in a two-venue retrospective exhibition, Gladys Triana: A Path to Enlightenment 1971–2021, at the Art Museum at University of Saint Joseph and Fairfield University Art Museum in 2022. The shows featured works spanning several decades of her career, and included over one hundred pieces, including paintings, drawings, photography, installation, sculpture, and video work. The dual exhibition received coverage in Art New England Magazine and La Voz Hispana de Connecticut.

== Work with Reinaldo Arenas ==
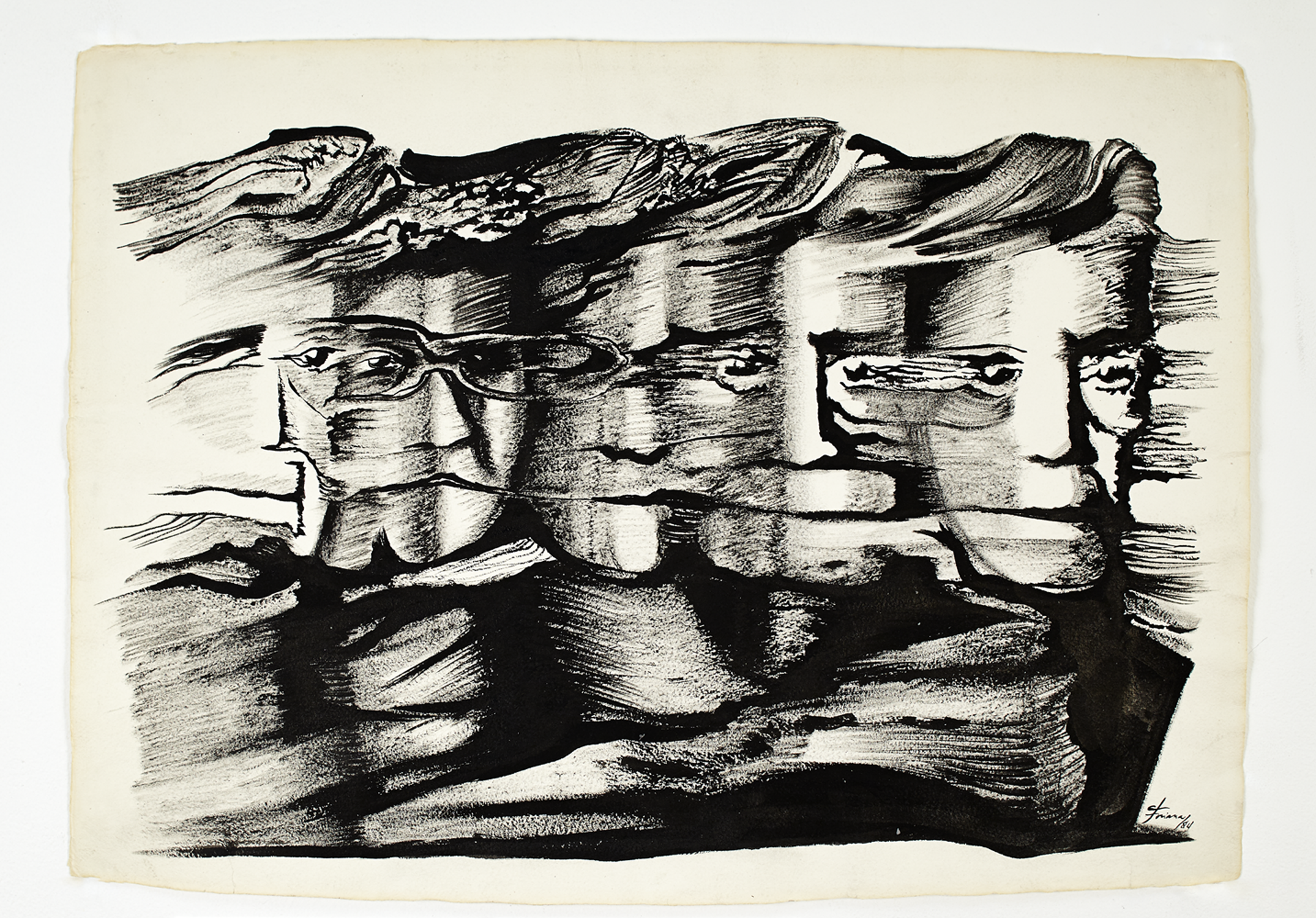
The Dynamic of Love. Drawing, 1984.

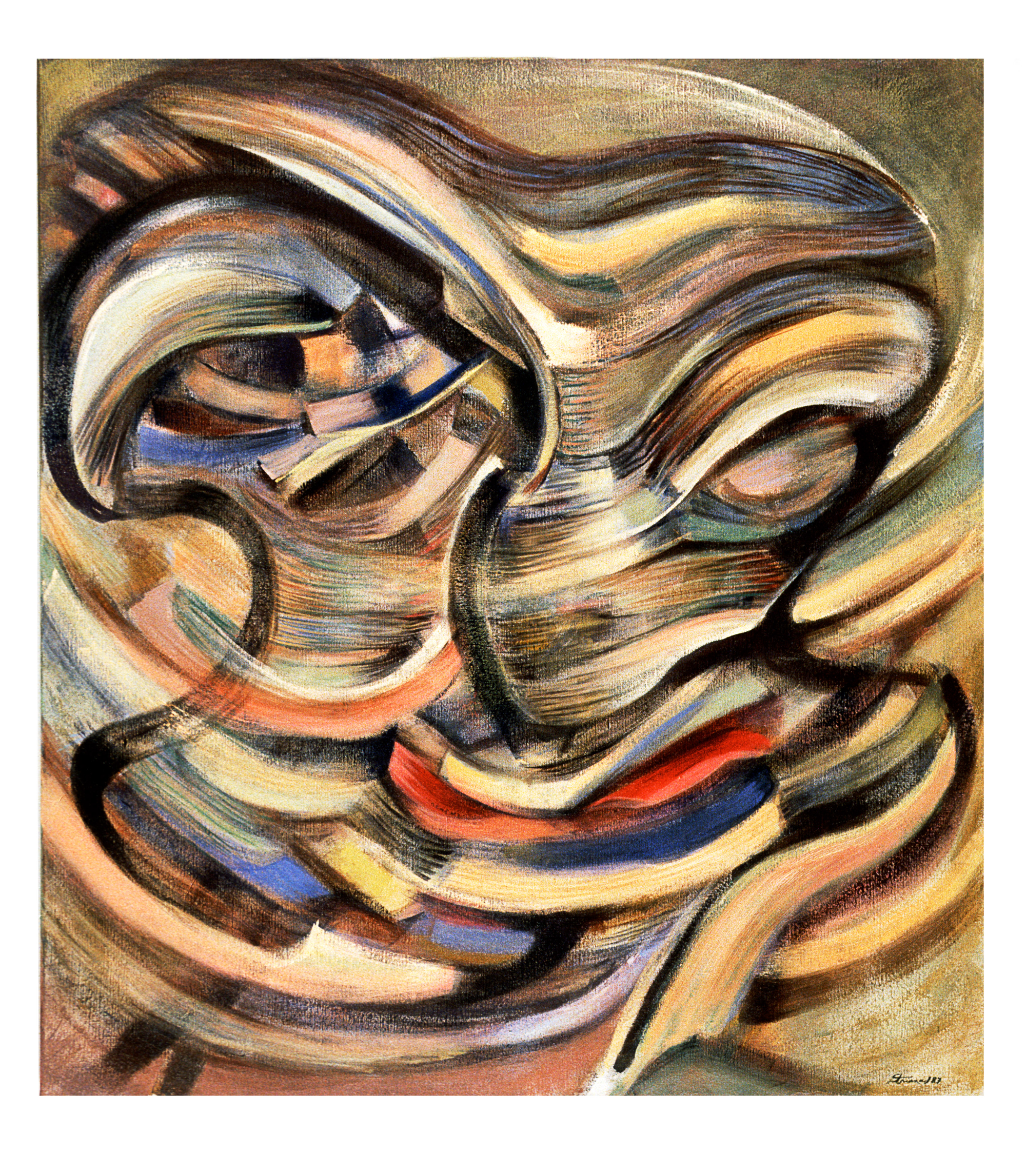
The Blind Gaze of the Poet. Oil on canvas, 1987.

In 1982, Triana began work on a series of drawings in black ink of faces in various states of distortion and transformation. Triana met Reinaldo Arenas at a conference on his writing at the New York Public Library in 1986. Shortly after their meeting, Arenas visited Triana's studio and selected ten drawings and five paintings, composing a brief poetic accompaniment for each piece. Triana and Arena's collaborative works were first exhibited in March 1988 as Transformation and Dynamics Through Motion at the Cuban Museum of Art and Culture in Miami. The exhibition was retitled Confluencias, and had a second showing in 2003 in Cádiz, Spain. Confluencias was exhibited an additional four times between 2003-2006 in Mexico.

== Awards ==
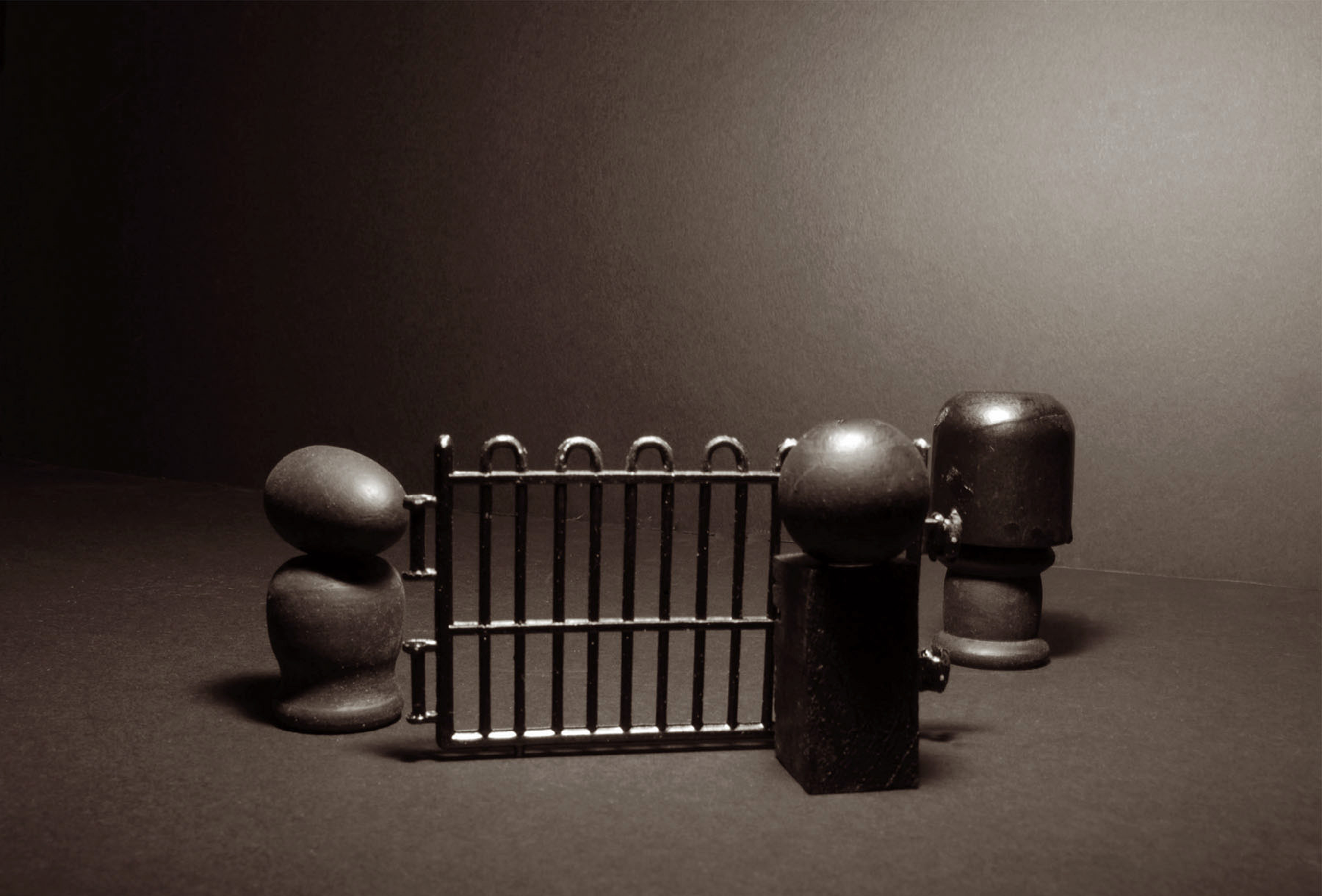
The Observer VIII. Photograph, 2008

Triana has been awarded with several distinctions and recognitions during her career, among them the Second Prize in the Bienal de Segovia, in Segovia, Spain, in 1972; The National Prize for the Clairol Loving Care Scholarship Program, in New York, 1974; Honorable Mention, Third Pan-American Art Festival, Museum of Science and Industry, Chicago, Illinois, 1975; The Oscar B. Cintas Foundation Fellowship, Special Award, New York, 1993–94; The Oscar B. Cintas Foundation Fellowship, Special Award, 2009–10; Creative A Living Legacy program recipient, Joan Mitchell Foundation, New York; and the Amelia Pelaez Award, Centro Cultural Cubano of New York, 2016. From 2016-17, and again in 2018-19, Triana was awarded with grants from the Pollock-Krasner Foundation to continue her work in photography and improve her health. In June 2017, Triana was invited as an artist in residence at the Center for Contemporary Printmaking in Norwalk, Connecticut.

== Bibliography ==
- Vicente Baez, Virilio Pinera, Calvert Casey, Anton Arrufat. Pintores Cubanos. Havana, Cuba: Ediciones Revolucion, 1962. Print.
- Collischan Van Wagner, Judy K. Lines of Vision. New York: Hudson Hills Press, 1989. 143. Print.
- Pequeño Formato Latinoamericano 94. Luigi Marrozzini Gallery, 1994. 87. Print.
- Kahn, Robin. Time Capsule: A Concise Encyclopedia by Women Artists. New York: Creative Time, Inc., 1995. 340-341. Print.
- Ulla and Greger Olsson Art Collection. Contemporary Latin American Art. Kulturcentrum I Ronneby, 1997. 39-44. Print.
- Jose Veigas-Zamora, Cristina Vives Gutierrez, Adolfo V. Nodal, Valia Garzon, Dannys Montes de Oca; Memoria: Cuban Art of the 20th Century. California/International Arts Foundation, 2001. ISBN 978-0-917571-11-4. Print.
- Paul M O'Reilly (editor). ev+a 2003 - on the border of each other. Gandon Editions, 2003. 198-199. Print. ISBN 0948037 032.
- Salida de Emergencia: Arte Cubano en el Exilio. Editorial Hispano Cubana, Madrid, 2003. 34-35. Print. ISBN 84-607-7643-3.
- Jose Viegas. Memoria: Artes Visuales Cubanas Del Siglo Xx. California International Arts Foundation, 2004. ISBN 978-0-917571-12-1. Print.
- ES2004: III International Standard Biennial. Conaculta Cecut, 2004. 68. Print. ISBN 970-35-0687-9.
- Lehigh University Art Galleries. Latin American Photography 2: Selections from the Lehigh University Art Galleries Collection. Lehigh University, Bethlehem, PA, 2006. 65. Print.
- Lehigh University Art Galleries. Latin American Art 3: Cuban Selections from the LUAG Teaching Collection. Lehigh University, Bethlehem, PA, 2010. 17. Print.
- Lehigh University Art Galleries. Women Photographers: Selections from the LUAG Teaching Collection. Lehigh University, Bethlehem, PA, 2011. 137. Print.
- Gladys Triana (images), Reinaldo Arenas (texts), Gerardo Zavarce (text and curation). Labyrinths of Image and Word [Laberintos de la IMAGEN y la palabra]. The Chill Concept, Miami, FL. 2014. Print.
- Lehigh University Art Galleries / Teaching Museum. ...Of The Americas: Contemporary Latin American Art from the LUAG Teaching Collection. Lehigh University Art Galleries, Bethlehem, PA, 2016. 116-119. Print.
- Gladys Triana, Marina Wecksler. Gladys Triana: A Retrospective Review: 1956-2016. Miami: Wecksler Publishing, 2016. Print. ISBN 978-0-692-80735-4.
- The Olsson Art Collection. Contemporary Latin American Art. Landskrona Konsthall in Landskrona, Sweden, June 2017. Print.
