= Gladys Cooper (artist) =

British painter

Gladys Cooper (1899–1975) was a British naïve painter whose work was recognized by Theodore Major, a noted Lancashire artist, when Cooper took a course with him at the age of 52. Cooper was born in Liverpool, but spent most of her life in Preston, Lancashire.

She worked in oil paint, starting with a picture (or partial picture) in a sketch book. "She said she had never had a drawing lesson, so did not know much about perspective and shading, and couldn't draw people very well so that was why she often did back views." "All her paintings, no matter how simple in their make-up, are shot through and through with haunting echoes of what she called 'our sinister times'." She exhibited at London's Grosvenor Gallery and Portal Gallery. Examples of her paintings from The Whitworth (Manchester), Glasgow Museums Resource Center, and Salford Museum and Art Gallery can be seen on Art UK.
