= Gladys Holmes =

Women's rights and education activist

- Born: 1892
- Died: 1969 (aged 76–77)
- Education: Radcliffe College
- Occupations: Civil rights activist; education activist
- Known for: Leadership in the League of Women for Community Service; Stay Out for Freedom education boycott; President of the Massachusetts State Union of Women's Clubs
- Awards: Black Women Lead project honoree (2023)

Gladys Holmes (1892 - 1969) was a women's rights and education activist in Boston.

Holmes was a Radcliffe graduate. She was the former president of the League of Women for Community Service. Holmes advanced literacy during her leadership of the home. She was also a former president of the Massachusetts State Union of Women's Clubs. Holmes was the chairman of the National Convention Committee at the fourth convention of the National Association of Colored Women.

Holmes was a Stay Out By Roxbury education activist, part of the Stay Out for Freedom boycott to rase awareness of de facto segregation in Boston Public Schools. She worked on the Stay Out for Freedom Day alongside Roy Wilkins, the national Executive Secretary of the NAACP; Gordon Carey of the Congress of Racial Equality (CORE); Rev. O. Karl Olander, New England Synod President, Lutheran Church in America, and Rev. Este Clair Kirton.

In 2023, she was recognized as one of "Boston’s most admired, beloved, and successful Black Women leaders" by the Black Women Lead project.
