= Gladys Anderson =

New Zealand artist

- Born: Gladys Louise Anderson; 19th century
- Known for: Painting
- Notable work: The Passing Stream
- Spouse: Andy J Anderson

Gladys Louise Anderson was a New Zealand artist, born in the 19th century.

== Career ==
Gladys Anderson was known for woodcuts and linocuts, works include The Passing Stream (c. 1929).

Anderson was exhibited with The Group, an informal art association from Christchurch, New Zealand, formed to provide a freer alternative to the Canterbury Society of Arts. She contributed works to exhibitions in: 1933 and 1934. She also exhibited with the Canterbury Society of Arts, New Zealand Academy of Fine Arts, and Otago Art Society.

=== New Zealand Motor Caravan Association ===
Gladys Anderson and her husband Andy J Anderson had a passion for motor caravans, purchasing their first vintage passenger bus in 1955. Her husband formed the NZ Motor Caravan Association and Gladys is the author of The History of the First 21 Years of the N.Z.M.C.A. Inc., 1956–1977, published in 1977 by the New Zealand Motor Caravan Association.
