= Gladys Bissonette =

Gladys Bissonette, "the brave–hearted woman of Wounded Knee", was an Oglala Lakota elder who was one of the leaders of the traditional faction during the violent turmoil on the Pine Ridge Indian Reservation during the 1970s. Dick Wilson became Tribal Chairman in 1972 and began a "reign of terror" on the reservation. Wilson favored mixed–blood residents and close family and friends for positions in his office and created a special enforcing unit, known as the "Goon Squad", to police the region. This Goon Squad soon began to terrorize the residents of the reservation who openly spoke out against Wilson or disagreed with him, especially those who were pure–blooded Indians. Many attempts were made at impeaching Wilson, but Wilson always interfered and subsequently kept his position by sending out his Goon Squad to stamp out the residents who dared try to impeach him. "The past administrations all along have been pretty sly and crooked with Indian funds," said Gladys, "but they weren't quite as hard on us as this drunken fool we got now."

== Calico Hall ==
On February 27, 1973, the traditionalists and others from Pine Ridge that were persecuted by Wilson's administration gathered at Calico Hall to discuss what was to be done about their situation. Attending the meeting were two leaders of AIM, Russell Means and Dennis Banks, who were invited there to hear the people and see if they could help them with the injustice happening on the reservation. Many people talked at Calico but two of the most influential speakers were Ellen Moves Camp and Gladys Bissonette. Gladys eloquently spoke for twenty minutes, asking AIM to come to Pine Ridge and help them fight the injustice; she stated "for many years we have not fought any kind of war, we have not fought any kind of battle, and we have forgotten how to fight." After Gladys and Ellen Moves Camp spoke, Chief Frank Fools Crow declared that the group at Calico Hall should go to Wounded Knee to protest.

== Wounded Knee Occupation ==
That night on February 27, 1973, a caravan of cars made its way to Wounded Knee. The subsequent occupation of the village lasted 71 days. During the occupation, Gladys Bissonette worked at the health clinic established there and was one of the negotiators with Kent Frizzell, the Assistant Attorney General selected to negotiate with the occupiers. Bissonette adamantly argued with Frizzell over the terms of the cease fire and what would happen after Wounded Knee. She stressed that the reason all the protesters were at Wounded Knee was because the government gave them no other way to get their attention. She stated in one round of negotiations that "we have wrote letters, we have sent phone calls —I know, I did myself. We have made statements to our Congressmen. We asked, we begged, that Pine Ridge be investigated. It never was done." The Wounded Knee occupation finally ended on May 8, 1973.

If the United States Government had honored our 1868 Treaty, I would think right today we would all live in peace because we the Lakota Nation upheld our treaties... Any militancy on our part has been provoked by the United States. Anything of violence shows the people of the world that the United States Government has made these laws and not lived up to them. They broke all of them since 1868.

== Life after Wounded Knee ==
After Wounded Knee, Gladys went back to Pine Ridge but was put on trial by the U.S. courts. Pedro Bissonette, another activist in the Wounded Knee Occupation and Gladys Bissonette's adopted son, was killed on October 1, 1973. Tragedy struck again on March 30, 1975 when Richard Eagle, Gladys Bissonette's grandson, was killed while playing with a loaded gun kept for protection from the Goon Squad. Gladys died not many years later.
