= Gladys Kleinwort Bowles =

American sociologist and demographer (1917–2009)

- Born: Gladys Kleinwort; August 23, 1917; St. Ansgar, Iowa, U.S.
- Died: November 27, 2009 (aged 92)
- Resting place: Carpenter, Iowa
- Education: Hamilton Business School, University of Wisconsin, University of Maryland, American University
- Occupations: Sociologist, demographer
- Known for: U.S. Net Migration Study
- Title: Head of Labor Force Research at U.S. Department of Agriculture
- Parent(s): Sherwin A. Kleinwort, Irma Lubiens Kleinwort

Gladys Kleinwort Bowles (1917–2009) was a rural sociologist and professional demographer who spent 40 years working for the U.S. Federal Government focusing mostly on statistics of net migration of the U.S. population from 1950 to 1960 as well as from 1960 to 1970. She was born on her family farm on August 23, 1917, to parents Sherwin A. Kleinwort and Irma Lubiens Kleinwort in St. Ansgar, Iowa where she also attended high school. She went to Mason City to attend Hamilton Business School, graduating in 1938.

== Career ==
After Hamilton Business School, Gladys started her long career in the federal government as a clerk typist at the U.S. Department of Agriculture (USDA). While there she quickly found encouragement from rural sociologist, Margaret Jarman Hagood, who often went out of her way to help mentor young women at the USDA. Hagwood promoted Gladys from a secretary to professional staffer, from which Gladys would eventually find herself in charge of all farm and labor studies for the entire Department of Agriculture. Hagwood also encouraged Gladys to pursue graduate school at the University of Wisconsin where she ultimately got a degree in sociology and demography. Gladys also continued to further her graduate studies at the University of Maryland and the American University in Washington D.C. In 1942, she married Charles T. Bowles and divorced in 1950, but retained the last name Bowles.

During her career at the USDA, Gladys Bowles constructed, researched and published many articles, papers and statistical databases on the net migration of the U.S. population from 1950 to 1960 as well as from 1960 to 1970. This project was a massive undertaking and was by and large her greatest achievement. The study documented the movement of the population by age, race and sex for every county and major division of all states. She also explored the poverty implications of migration from rural to urban spaces.

Gladys Bowles received many accolades throughout her career. She also participated in and helped to run many professional demographic and sociology organizations. She served as vice president of the Population Association of America and president of the Southern Demographic Association. Bowles worked tirelessly in her field, continuing to work long after her retirement. After she left her decades-long job with the USDA, Bowles moved to Athens, Georgia and spent her years in retirement there, establishing and running her own self-titled research facility, Bowles Demographic Research.

She died on November 27, 2009, at the Good Samaritan Center in St. Ansgar, Iowa. She was buried at Newburg Cemetery, Carpenter, Iowa.
