= Gwladys Evan Morris =

British actress

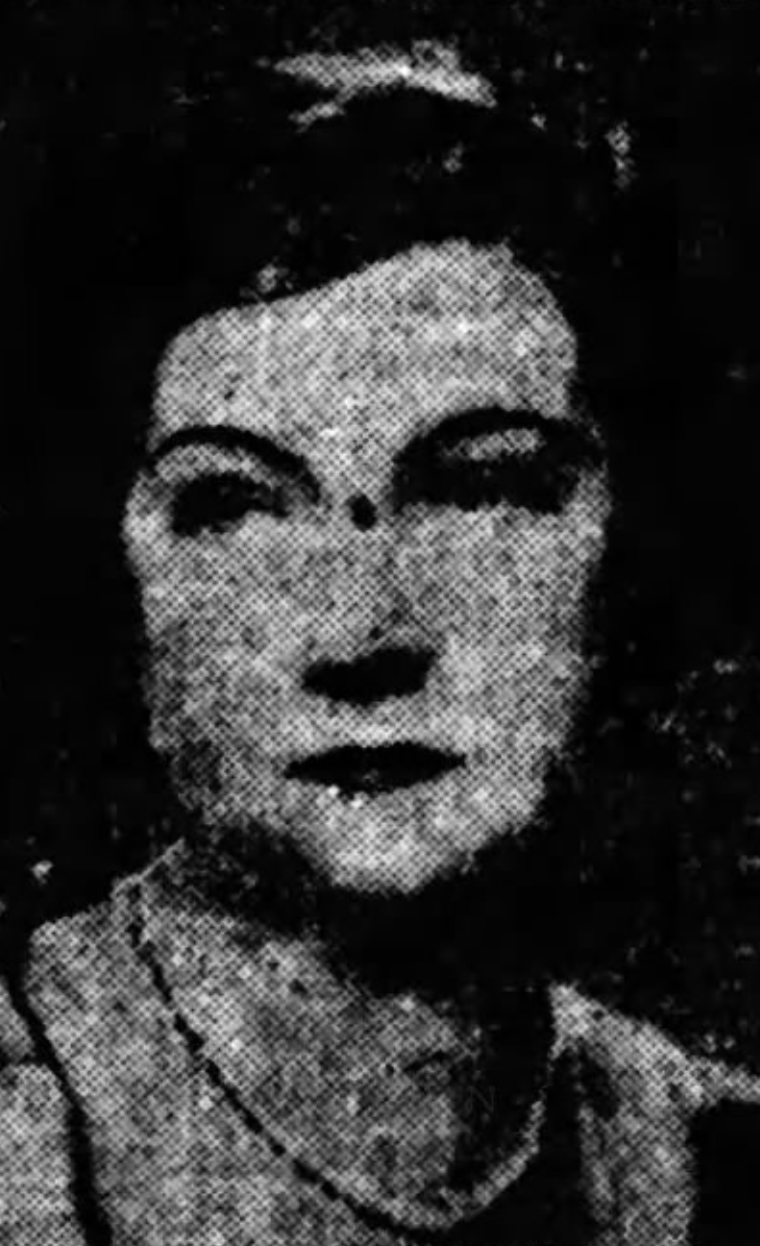
- Gwladys Evan Morris, from a 1929 Welsh newspaper
- Born: 7 June 1879; Wrexham, Denbighshire, Wales, U.K.
- Died: 6 March 1957 (age 77); Notting Hill, London, U.K.
- Occupations: Actress, writer

Gwladys Evan Morris (7 June 1879 – 6 March 1957) was a Welsh stage actress and writer.

== Early life ==
Morris was born in Wrexham, Denbighshire, Wales, one of the six daughters of Sir Evan Morris and the former Frances Elizabeth Rowland. Her father, a prominent solicitor, was mayor of Wrexham and chair of the general committee of the National Eisteddfod in 1888, died in 1890. Her maternal grandfather, Thomas Rowland, also served a term as mayor of Wrexham.

== Career ==
=== Acting ===
Morris's acting career began in 1903, when she went on a tour to the West Indies and India with Frank Benson's company. She also travelled to the United States, Ireland, Nova Scotia, and New Zealand. She mainly acted in plays by George Bernard Shaw, whom she greatly admired.

From 1916 to 1920, Morris appeared in Shakespearean plays with the Henry Jewett Players, and then in London theatres from 1920 on. In 1929, Morris toured with the Macdona Company. In 1931, she played Vera Lyndon in Rodney Ackland's Strange Orchestra at the Embassy Theatre, in 1933 she was in the cast of Richard Hughes' The Comedy of Good and Evil with the Welsh National Theatre Players, and in 1936 was in Ackland's After October at the Criterion Theatre and the Aldwych Theatre. She retired in 1939.

=== Writing and other activities ===
Morris wrote Tales from Bernard Shaw, which was first published in 1929 by George G. Harrap and Co. of London, and was printed by H & J Pillans & Wilson of Edinburgh. An American edition was published in 1929 by Frederick A. Stokes of New York. The book, written with Shaw's permission, was an attempt to retell the stories of Shaw's plays as fairy tales or fables, many of them with animal characters. For example, Morris explains that the character of Jack (a chattering monkey in her story of Man and Superman) is Shaw himself, and that the woman's part in another of her stories (based on Captain Brassbound's Conversion) is written "expressly for and round the personality of Ellen Terry", a famous actress of the day who had died, a year before publication, in 1928. Morris's book, illustrated by Phyllis Amelia Trery, was described as "a work of imagination and insight"; the same reviewer said that Morris's "humour is both piquant and delightful."

Morris also invented a "fob comb"--a small comb with its own carrying purse. During World War II, she was churchwarden at St. George's in Campden Hill.

== Personal life ==
Morris died in 1957, at the age of 77, at her home in Notting Hill.
