= Gladys Gregory =

British actuary (1899–1981)

Gladys Gregory (1899–1981)

Gladys Caroline Brooker (née Gregory; 19 May 1899 – 6 November 1981) was one of two women to share the accolade of first woman actuary in the United Kingdom, the other being Dorothy Spiers, née Davis. Gregory joined Prudential Assurance in 1917, direct from school, and passed the actuarial exams at the Institute of Actuaries in 1923.

== Early life and education ==
Gladys Caroline Gregory was born on 19 May 1899 at 32 Mina Road, Walworth, London and was the eldest daughter of shoemaker, Thomas Gregory (1871–1966), and his wife, Harriet Elizabeth Gregory, née Cobbett (1870–1958). She attended the local council school in Clapham where she gained the school-leaving certificate.

== Career ==
Gregory joined Prudential Assurance in July 1917 when she was 18. In November 1919 The Institute of Actuaries voted to admit women on the same conditions as men. Gregory passed her first exam in 1920 and the subsequent exams in each year afterwards, qualifying in 1923, alongside Dorothy Davis. Passing the exams was clearly a shared endeavour - Dorothy and Gladys “coached” and did their “very hard swotting” together, for “…the ‘stiffest’ tests in mathematics”, qualifying in less than the “usual four years”. In 1923 Gregory was the more prominent of the pair: at 24 she was two years younger than her counterpart; her final examination was said to have been “faultless”, and she would have come overall first had the results been ranked. Writing in Good Housekeeping in October 1923, she commended the profession to well-educated girls, prepared to work hard and give up their evenings to study. She also made the point that many insurance offices were overstaffed, and opportunities for girls were limited.

== Personal and later life ==
Gladys resigned from Prudential in April 1927, shortly before she married John Brooker, and she formally resigned as a Fellow of the Institute of Actuaries in October 1927. After their marriage, she became a housewife and had two daughters. Gregory died on 16 November 1981 in Wokingham, Berkshire.
