= League of Jewish Women =

UK Jewish women's service organisation

The League of Jewish Women (LJW) is a voluntary Jewish women's service organisation in the United Kingdom. It is affiliated to more than 30 other national and international organisations, and is the UK affiliate of the International Council of Jewish Women. Membership is open to Jewish men as well as women.

LJW is a voluntary service organisation that provides help within both the Jewish and the wider community. Members are organised in local groups who meet for social events and arrange their voluntary service. Voluntary work ranges from hospital and home visits to working in prisons, and helping in day centres for older people. Members also work in schools, baby clinics and contact centres.

The president of the League of Jewish Women is Yvonne Josse.
