= Lorelei DeCora =

Native American nurse and civil rights activist from Nebraska

- Born: Lorelei DeCora; October 1954 (age 71); Winnebago Reservation, Nebraska, U.S.
- Citizenship: Winnebago Tribe of Nebraska and US
- Education: University of South Dakota 1981 (ADN); South Dakota State University 1986 (BSN)
- Occupations: Registered nurse, grassroots activist
- Years active: 1973–present
- Known for: American Indian Movement; Pie Patrol; Women of All Red Nations; We Will Remember Survival School; Black Hills Alliance; AIDS Resource Team; International Indian Treaty Council; KILI RADIO 90.1 FM; Porcupine Clinic; Diabetes Talking Circles
- Spouse: Ted Means (ex-husband)
- Children: 3 children (all daughters): Marcella Gilbert
- Relatives: Russell Means (brother-in-law); Madonna Thunder Hawk (in-law); Five grandchildren
- Awards: 1993 Robert Wood Johnson Community Health Leadership Award; 1997 William Kunstler Fund for Racial Justice Award

Lorelei DeCora Means (née DeCora; born 1954) is a Native American nurse and civil rights activist. She is best known for her role in the second siege in the town of Wounded Knee, South Dakota, on the Pine Ridge Indian Reservation. She was also a co-founder of the American Indian organization, Women of All Red Nations.

== Early life ==
Lorelei DeCora was born on the Winnebago Reservation in the state of Nebraska. She is an enrolled citizen of the Winnebago Tribe of Nebraska (Thunderbird Clan) and a descendant of the Minnecojou Lakota through her mother. Her great-grandmother was a survivor of the Wounded Knee Massacre at the Wounded Knee Creek.

== Personal life ==
In 1981, Lorelei received an associate degree in nursing from the University of South Dakota and a bachelor's degree in nursing from South Dakota State University in 1986. Lorelei would also have three daughters before divorcing her husband, Theodore "Ted" Means.

== Activism ==
Lorelei became involved in the Red Power Movement at a relatively early age in her life. Lorelei was enrolled at a Catholic grade school on the Winnebago Reservation in Nebraska, where she resisted numerous endeavors undertaken by school officials to cut her ties to her American Indian cultural traditions. In high school, her family protested against a history book, entitled Hawkeye Tales, that was being used by Sioux City public school officials to educate children despite its graphically negative and racist portrayal of American Indians. Their protest led to the book being removed from the curriculum in the Iowa public school system.

=== American Indian Movement ===
It was also during high school that Lorelei DeCora became one of the youngest members on the board of directors for the AIM.

=== Wounded Knee incident ===
Lorelei also participated in the American Indian Movement occupation of the Wounded Knee. She was a member of the Pie Patrol, a group of women active in AIM, consisting of herself, Thelma Rios, and Theda Nelson Clarke. Mary Crow Dog (née Brave Bird), wife of civil rights activist Leonard Crow Dog, who also participated in the siege at Wounded Knee, referred to the members of the Pie Patrol as "loud-mouth city women, media conscious and hugging the limelight," who loved the camera and took credit for what the women of AIM were doing behind the scenes. This group of women bore particular resentment against an individual by the name of Anna Mae Pictou Aquash. Anna Mae, a MikMaq woman from Nova Scotia, was having an affair with Dennis Banks, founder of the American Indian Movement while he was still involved in a common-law marriage with Darlene "Kamook" Nichols. The affair did not sit well with the women of different tribal affiliations within the movement, and these women (as well as the Pie Patrol) viewed the relationship as a threat to AIM's stability. Multiple witnesses have placed Lorelei in the lone medical facility operated by AIM during the 20th-century Wounded Knee Siege when Ray Robinson was brought into the facility. One account details how Robinson was shot in the knee, dragged outside, beaten and taken to the Wounded Knee Medical Clinic ran by Lorelei Decora Means and Madonna Thunder Hawk, as well as several other volunteer nurses and medics. Ray was then reportedly shoved into a closet, where he died of exsanguination.

Lorelei was also present during the interrogation of Annie Mae, where Madonna Thunder Hawk slapped Annie Mae around.

=== Post Wounded Knee incident ===
In 1974, Lorelei and Madonna were also co-founders of the Women of All Red Nations organization. The grassroots group was created as a solution to the leadership vacuum which surfaced following the aftermath of the Wounded Knee incident. The Women of All Red Nations addressed devastating socioeconomic problems American Indians living on the reservation dealt with, such as a poor state of nutrition, insufficient and inadequate healthcare, compulsory sterilization programs, and domestic violence in response to a constellation of poor social determinants, including poverty, lack of employment, substance abuse and mental health illness.

In 1974, Lorelei De Cora, along with Madonna, founded and established, the 'We Will Remember Survival School,' a place where American Indian youth whose parents were facing federal charges or who had dropped out of the secondary education system. Specifically, the school was founded for the children of participants who were defendants in the Wounded Knee trials which followed the American Indian Movement occupation of the Pine Ridge Indian Reservation. This alternative model was a component of the National Federation of Native-Controlled Survival Schools that was established during the movement.

In 1979, Lorelei was a co-founder and organizer who helped establish the Black Hills Alliance. The Black Hills Alliance was responsible for preventing the Union Carbide corporation from mining uranium on sacred Lakota land. Thunder Hawk fought to preserve the land in sacred Black Hills from developers wishing to raze the area, and conducted analyses on the water supplies on the Pine Ridge Indian Reservation, proving there were dangerously high levels of radiation in the water supply. The result of her activism was the implementation of a new water system. The Black Hills Alliance was also founded to rally against the mining of uranium in the region and to educate communities about the risks, dangers and consequences of mineral development.

As a nurse, Lorelei continued to expand her foray into the domain of pan-Indian activist affairs. As a result, she co-founded the AIDS Resource Team, which served as the only community AIDS education initiative in the state of South Dakota at the time of its establishment, which was geared toward providing a greater awareness and understanding of AIDS. She also played a pivotal role in the establishment of the International Indian Treaty Council, a non-governmental organization which operates through the United Nations, and serves as a podium for indigenous populations throughout the international community. Lorelei was also an instrumental component in the formation and development of the first and only independent American Indian Radio Station (KILI Radio, Porcupine, S.D.).

In 1987, Lorelei took a full-time job as a Registered Nurse with the Indian Health Service hospital located in Rosebud, South Dakota. Although she continued to devote time to the Porcupine Clinic in the capacity of an administrative consultant, she found yet another cause to champion when working with patients at the hospital in Rosebud. It was here she stumbled across an excess of patients who were being treated for diabetes-related complications. Lorelei was the innovator responsible for the conception of Diabetes Talking Circles. She was able to launch the program in conjunction with the Seva Foundation in 1996. The method employed is a form of highly specialized training that helps Native people cultivate a set of self-managed strategies for diabetes prevention and treatment while simultaneously observing the importance Native spiritual and religious beliefs, in addition to using the basis as an education tool. Lorelei currently serves as the Project Director of both, the Seva Foundation - Native American Diabetes Project and the Diabetes Wellness: American Indian Talking Circles Project. Lorelei serves on the National Diabetes Education Program - NDEP, American Indian Work Group.

Lorelei also managed to spearhead the opening of the first community-owned and operated clinic on a tribal reservation in the United States. In 1980, a community meeting inspired Lorelei to open a clinic to better serve the needs of residents living in the region, which was first funded by the SEVA Foundation. Between 1989 and 1991, the Porcupine Clinic was only opened on a part-time basis. However, in the year 1992, it received state certification as a rural health clinic, and was able to provide an extensive range of health services, including preventive and primary care, prenatal care, immunizations, and health education, to both American Indians and non-Native Americans. Today, the Porcupine Clinic is the only free-standing, non-profit, community-supported clinic operating in the rural territory in Indian country.

== Awards ==
Lorelei is a 1993 recipient of the Robert Wood Johnson Community Health Leadership Award, a recipient of the 1997 William Kunstler Fund for Racial Justice Award.

== Legacy ==
Lorelei has also been mentioned in numerous publications, including Ghost Dancing the Law: The Wounded Knee Trials, authored by John William Sayer, The American Midwest: An Interpretive Encyclopedia, edited by Andrew R. L. Cayton, Richard Sisson, Chris Zacher, The State of Native America: Genocide, Colonization, and Resistance, edited by M. Annette Jaimes, Red Power: The American Indians' Fight for Freedom, edited by Alvin M. Josephy, Joane Nagel, Troy R. Johnson, Ojibwa Warrior: Dennis Banks and the Rise of the American Indian Movement, authored by Dennis Banks and Richard Erdoes, and Beyond Nature's Housekeepers: American Women in Environmental History, authored by Nancy C. Unger.

== See also ==
- American Indian Movement
- Wounded Knee Incident
- Anna Mae Pictou Aquash
- Ray Robinson
- Women of All Red Nations
- Madonna Thunder Hawk
