= Madonna Thunder Hawk =

Cheyenne River Sioux activist

Madonna Gilbert
- Madonna Thunder Hawk
- Born: Madonna Phillips; 1940 (age 85–86); Yankton Sioux Reservation
- Occupations: Grassroots activist Water Rights activist
- Years active: 1969–present
- Organization(s): American Indian Movement; Pie Patrol; Women of All Red Nations; Black Hills Alliance; Wounded Knee Legal Defense Offense Committee (WKLDOC)
- Known for: Occupation of Alcatraz; Wounded Knee incident We Will Remember Survival School; Lakota People's Law Project
- Relatives: Russell Means (first cousin) Dawn DeCora (Daughter) Marcella Gilbert (daughter) DeCora Hawk (granddaughter)
- Website: Lakota People's Law Project

Madonna Thunder Hawk (born Madonna Phillips) is a Native American civil rights activist best known as a member and leader in the American Indian Movement (AIM), co-founding Women of All Red Nations (WARN) and the Black Hills Alliance, and as an organizer against the Dakota Access Pipeline. She established the Wasagiya Najin Grandmothers' Group on the Cheyenne River to help build kinship networks while also developing Simply Smiles Children Village. She also serves as the Director of Grassroots Organizing for the Red Road Institute. Thunder Hawk has spoken around the world as a delegate to the United Nations and is currently the Lakota People's Law Project principal and Tribal liaison. She was an International Indian Treaty Council delegate to the United Nations Human Rights Commission in Geneva. Also, a delegate to the U.N. Decade of Women Conference in Mexico City and in the 2001 to the World Conference against Racism in Durban, South Africa.

== Early life ==
Born in 1940 as Madonna Phillips, Thunder Hawk was born on the Yankton Sioux Reservation. She hails from the Feather Necklace Tiospaye (extended family) and belongs to the Oohenumpa band of the Cheyenne River Sioux Tribe. Thunder Hawk was raised in a strict environment by her mother, who had, herself, been raised in the culturally restrictive environment within the boarding schools of the 1920s and 1930s. Thunder Hawk, like her mother, attended several boarding schools throughout her youth. She then later graduated with her bachelor's degree in human services.

== Activism ==
Thunder Hawk was an early proponent of the Red Power Movement. She took part in the 1969-1971 Occupation of Alcatraz, with the goal of persuading the federal government to end its policy of termination and adopt an official policy of Indian self-determination.

In 1970 and 1971, Thunder Hawk was involved in the two occupations of Mount Rushmore, a part of the Black Hills seized by the US government in 1877. The occupation protested continued violations of the 1868 Treaty of Fort Laramie.

Established the "We Will Remember Survival School" for Indian Youth. This school was established for youth whose parents were facing federal charges or who had been drop-outs from the educational system.

=== American Indian Movement ===
Thunder Hawk joined the American Indian Movement in its early years and was present at AIM's occupation of the Wounded Knee. She was a member of the Pie Patrol, a group of women active in AIM, which also included Thelma Rios, Theda Nelson Clarke, Lorelei DeCora Means, and Mary Crow Dog (née Moore), wife of civil rights activist Leonard Crow Dog.

=== Wounded Knee Incident ===
Thunder Hawk took part in the American Indian Movement occupation of the Wounded Knee. She was a member of the Pie Patrol, a group of women active in AIM, consisting of Thelma Rios, Theda Nelson Clarke, and Lorelei DeCora Means. Mary Crow Dog (née Moore), wife of civil rights activist Leonard Crow Dog, who was also present during the siege at Wounded Knee, referred to the Pie Patrol as "loud-mouth city women, media conscious and hugging the limelight," who loved the camera and took credit for what the women of AIM were doing behind the scenes. This group of women bore particular resentment against an individual by the name of Anna Mae Pictou Aquash. Anna Mae, a Mi'kmaq woman from Nova Scotia, was having an affair with Dennis Banks, founder of the American Indian Movement while he was still involved in a common-law marriage with Darlene “Kamook” Nichols. The affair did not sit well with the women of different tribal affiliations within the movement, and these women (as well as the Pie Patrol) viewed the relationship as a threat to AIM's stability.

Various sources have placed Thunder Hawk in the lone medical facility operated by AIM during the 20th-century Wounded Knee Siege when Ray Robinson was brought into the facility. One account details how Robinson was shot in the knee, dragged outside, beaten and taken to the Wounded Knee Medical Clinic run by Thunder Hawk and Lorelei DeCora Means, as well as several other volunteer nurses and medics. Ray was then reportedly shoved into a closet, where he died of exsanguination.

=== Post Wounded Knee Incident ===
Thunder Hawk also served as director of the Wounded Knee Legal Defense Offense Committee (WKLDOC) in December 1975.

Along with Lorelei De Cora, she founded and established the 'We Will Remember Survival School,' meant to provide a safe place for American Indian youth whose parents were facing federal charges or who had dropped out of the secondary education system. Specifically, the school was founded for the children of defendants in the Wounded Knee trials which followed the American Indian Movement occupation of the Pine Ridge Indian Reservation. This alternative model was a component of the National Federation of Native-Controlled Survival Schools that was established during the movement as a Native alternative to government-run education.

In 1974, Thunder Hawk and DeCora, along with a handful of other Native American women, founded Women of All Red Nations (WARN). Following the male-dominated activism of the AIM and Red Power movements, WARN organized around women's issues in Native American activism. The group worked to address sterilization abuse, political prisoners, children and family rights, and threats to indigenous land bases.

Thunder Hawk was a co-founder and spokesperson for the Black Hills Alliance. The Black Hills Alliance was responsible for preventing the Union Carbide corporation from mining uranium on sacred Lakota land. Thunder Hawk fought to preserve the land in sacred Black Hills from developers wishing to raze the area, and conducted analyses on the water supplies on the Pine Ridge Indian Reservation, proving the existence of dangerously high levels of radiation in the water supply. The result of her activism was the implementation of a new water system.

In 2004, Thunder Hawk joined with the Romero Institute to form the Lakota People's Law Project (LPLP) with the goal of encouraging more vigilant federal enforcement and reform of the Indian Child Welfare Act (ICWA) to enable more Lakota children to continue living with their families or, at the least, on their ancestral homelands on the reservation.

Thunder Hawk created Wasagiya Najin or, "Grandmothers' Group" to assist in preventing the unlawful extraction of children from tribal nations.

In 2016, Thunder Hawk joined the movement against the Dakota Access pipeline and provided an inspiring presence at a resistance camp in North Dakota. Thunder Hawk is a founder of the Warrior Women Project.

== Filmography ==
Film
Year	Film	Role	Notes
1992	Incident at Oglala	Herself	Documentary
1994	Lakota Women: Siege at Wounded Knee	Medic	Drama
1996	Crazy Horse	Head Seamstress	Costume and Wardrobe Department (1 Credit)
2009	William Kunstler: Disturbing the Universe	Herself	Documentary
2021	End of the Line: The Women of Standing Rock	Herself	Documentary
Television
Year	Title	Role	Notes
2009	The American Experience	Herself	One Episode: We Shall Remain: Part V - Wounded Knee (PBS Documentary)
2018	Warrior Women	Herself	History and stories of Madonna Thunder Hawk from the 1970s to today (Documentary)

== Legacy ==
Thunder Hawk has also been mentioned in numerous publications, including Blood on the Border: A Memoir of the Contra War, authored by Roxanne Dunbar-Ortiz, ETHNOGRAPHIES OF CONSERVATION: Environmentalism and the Distribution of Privilege, edited by David G. Anderson and Eeva Berglund, We Worry about Survival: American Indian Women, Sovereignty, and the Right to Bear and Raise Children in the 1970s, authored by Meg Devlin O'Sullivan, Timelines of American Women's History, authored by Sue Heinemann and American Nations: Encounters in Indian Country, 1850 to the Present, edited by Frederick Hoxie, Peter Mancall and James Merrell.
