= News From Indian Country =

National monthly tribal newspaper

- Type: Weekly newspaper
- Owner: Indian Country Communications
- Founder: Paul DeMain
- Publisher: Paul DeMain
- Founded: 1986; 40 years ago
- Language: English
- City: Lac Courte Oreilles Indian Reservation, Wisconsin
- Country: United States
- ISSN: 1548-4939
- OCLC number: 29807522
- Website: www.indiancountrynews.com

News From Indian Country was a privately owned newspaper, published once a month in the United States, founded by the journalist Paul DeMain (Ojibwe/Oneida) in 1986, who served as a managing editor and an owner. It was the oldest continuing, nationally distributed publication that was not owned by a tribal government. It offered national, cultural and regional sections, and "the most up-to-date pow-wow directory in the United States and Canada," according to its website. The newspaper was offered both in print and electronic form and has subscribers throughout the United States, Canada and 17 other countries.

Due to the independence and persistence of DeMain and the paper in covering controversial topics in Indian Country since 2002, including investigations of the murders of Anna Mae Aquash and others at the Pine Ridge Indian Reservation from 1973 to 1975, he and the paper were honored with major awards from the Native American Journalists Association (NAJA) and the Payne Award for Ethics in Journalism from the University of Oregon.

In August 2019, after 33 years, News From Indian Country published its last issue.

== Background ==
DeMain founded the newspaper in 1986 after returning to the Lac Courte Oreilles Indian Reservation (LCO) from the capital Madison, Wisconsin. He had worked as Indian Affairs Advisor for Wisconsin governor Tony Earl, serving as a liaison in his outreach with Native Americans.

DeMain had previously worked for the Lac Courte Oreille tribe as its public information officer from 1978 to 1982; he published the tribe's newspaper, then the LCO Journal. He is the managing editor and chief executive officer of Indian Country Communications Inc. (ICC), a Wisconsin registered stock corporation, which has published the newspaper since 1987. As of 2007, seven Native Americans are registered as stock holders of the privately owned company. The offices of ICC are located on Highway K, near the tribe's business district, on the Lac Courte Oreilles Ojibwe Reservation near Hayward, Wisconsin.

Nationwide attention to jurisdictional conflicts over tribal treaty rights in Wisconsin and Minnesota helped the new publication spread its reach, while a rapidly spreading Indian gaming industry provided a source of advertising revenue in its early years. Owners have capitalized on emerging desk-top publishing and information management technology to keep up with an expanding market.

For 20 years, Pat Calliotte, one of the founding members, was the associate editor, until her death on November 17, 2006. Kimberlie R. Acosta (aka Kimberlie R. Hall) has worked with the paper since 1991; she is the associate editor and advertising director. She is best known for her photography of native musicians throughout Indian Country from 1997 to present.

News From Indian Country is the oldest nationally distributed Native publication which is independent and not owned by a tribal government. Columnists for NFIC include George-Kanentiio (Mohawk) from Akwesasne, New York, and Richard Wagamese (Ojibwe), a Canadian award-winning writer now residing in Kamloops, British Columbia. The newspaper has broken new ground online with IndianCountryTV, which began in 2008. IndianCountryTV brings the Native community to the world on a grassroots level, showing interviews, news stories and music videos. IndianCountryTV is the creator of RezStyle, with host Kimberlie R. Acosta, and the Native News Update, with anchor Kimberlie Acosta.

== Independent journalism ==
Since 2002, News From Indian Country has broken stories related to the investigation of murders during the 1970s at the Oglala Sioux Tribe Pine Ridge Indian Reservation in South Dakota. These include the American Indian Movement activist Anna Mae Aquash, whose maiden and legal name at the time of her death was Annie Mae Pictou, in December 1975; the FBI special agents Ronald A. Williams and Jack Coler earlier in 1975; and the Black civil rights activist Perry Ray Robinson, who had disappeared during the Wounded Knee Incident in 1973 and who was believed to have been murdered by AIM activists.

The paper's coverage contributed to federal investigations and attracted controversy for its implication of AIM leadership in the murder of Aquash, the highest-ranking woman in AIM. In January 2003, the US government began a grand jury hearing in Rapid City on the murder of Aquash. Based on the information DeMain had learned from people in the tribes, in March 2003 he wrote editorials in which he withdrew his previous support of clemency for Leonard Peltier. Soon after, a former AIM member, Ka-Mook Nichols, told DeMain that she had witnessed Peltier bragging about shooting the FBI agents. In March 2003, the US government indicted two men for the murder of Aquash.

Peltier sued DeMain and News From Indian Country sued for libel in May 2003. Some considered this an attempt to expose Nichols (on whom DeMain had relied in 2002 as one of three confidential sources of information) prior to her public testimony during the trial of Arlo Looking Cloud in 2004 for the murder of Aquash. Peltier dropped the lawsuit against News From Indian Country shortly after Looking Cloud's trial, with a settlement out of court.

Looking Cloud was tried and convicted in 2004. Witnesses in the trial testified to believing that AIM leaders had ordered the murder of Aquash because of fear that she was an FBI informer (she was interrogated at gunpoint) and would tell about having heard Peltier confess to the murders of the FBI agents Williams and Coler. John Graham was tried by the state of South Dakota in 2010 after extradition from Canada and convicted in 2010 of the felony murder of Aquash. Tracy Rios, a Lakota activist, was indicted with Graham; she made a plea bargain and pleaded guilty to charges as an accessory to the kidnapping of Aquash. A third man, Vine Richard "Dick" Marshall, bodyguard to the AIM leader Russell Means in 1975, was indicted in 2008 for aiding and abetting the murder by providing the murder weapon, but he was acquitted at trial in 2010.

== Honors ==
- 2002, DeMain was given the Wassaja Award, for courage by journalists covering Indian country. It was awarded by the Native American Journalists Association Board of Directors for his reporting on the imprisoned activist Leonard Peltier and the murder of Pictou-Aquash.
- 2003, DeMain was honored with the Payne Award for Ethics in Journalism by the University of Oregon for his editorials in News From Indian Country that expressed his withdrawal of previous support of clemency for Leonard Peltier.

== External links and sources ==
- Official website
- Indian Country TV
- Native American Journalists Association
