= Thelma Conroy-Rios =

Native American activist

- Born: Thelma Rae Charging Bear Conroy Rios; May 17, 1945; Pine Ridge Indian Reservation, South Dakota
- Died: February 9, 2011 (aged 65); Rapid City, South Dakota, US
- Resting place: Pine Lawn Memorial Park
- Citizenship: Oglala Sioux Tribe and U.S.
- Occupation: Activist
- Years active: 1973–2011
- Organization(s): American Indian Movement; PIE Patrol
- Known for: Participant in the murder of AIM Activist Anna Mae Aquash
- Spouse: Harry Hill (ex-husband)
- Children: 5

Thelma Conroy-Rios was a Native American activist. She is perhaps best known for her involvement in the Wounded Knee incident and for her involvement in the murder of fellow American Indian Movement activist Anna Mae Aquash. Rios was initially charged with murder but later agreed to a plea deal and pleaded guilty to accessory in the kidnapping of Aquash and was sentenced to five years in prison.

== Personal life ==
Between 1974 and 1975, Thelma Conroy-Rios allowed a fellow male activist Harry Hill (who was known by his middle name, David) to live with her. Conroy-Rios and Hill were said to be involved in a common law marriage.

Although identified as a cop by ex-wife Thelma Conroy-Rios, Hill's role as a law official is disputed.

Conroy-Rios identified Hill as having provoked the Custer Courthouse Incident Riot that unfolded in 1973 following a one-day jail sentence of murderer Darld Schmitz, a White Air Force veteran in the murder of Wesley Bad Heart Bull. According to Conroy-Rios, "He started it all, Dave. He provoked the riot. He was right there. He told me so, proudly, several times. He instigated that courtroom riot too. I was there. I saw him start it, punching a cop. At the time everybody thought it was great. He was a warrior. He was a hero and everybody trusted him, including me." Conroy-Rios' account is corroborated by a separate account found in Peter Matthiessen's book In the Spirit of Crazy Horse.

Conroy-Rios was an enrolled student at Black Hills State University, but had to drop out after her daughter was born with a rare blood disease in 1970.

== Legal history ==
=== Murder of Anna Mae Aquash ===
Anna Mae Aquash was a female activist within the ranks of the American Indian Movement.

On December 11, 1975, Aquash was forced out of the home of Denver AIM Troy Lynn S. Yellow Wood despite the latter's objection that something bad would happen to Aquash. She was taken to an apartment in Rapid City, South Dakota owned by Russell Means' brother, and during interrogation, she was raped by John Graham. Aquash was moved to two residences owned by Thelma Conroy-Rios. Looking Cloud indicated that he heard Graham and Aquash having sex in the bedroom of a Rapid City apartment (whose ownership is attributed to Thelma Conroy-Rios and her mother, which led to prosecutors alleging that Graham raped Aquash. These allegations were reinforced by the 'strong acid phosphate' found in the vagina, which "constitutes evidence in support of the allegation that defendant John Graham raped the victim at Thelma Rios' apartment on or about December 10–11, 1975." Graham acknowledged in a taped interview/interrogation that Looking Cloud waited outside of the room Aquash was imprisoned inside of. Aquash was then forcefully moved to the Rosebud Indian Reservation where AIM supporters refuse to house her. Nelson-Clarke was given orders to have Aquash eliminated. Theda Nelson Clarke, another female AIM activist, received instructions to have Aquash "dealt with" from Rapid City, South Dakota American Indian Movement activist Thelma Conroy-Rios.

Aquash's assassination allegedly was rooted in the mistaken belief that Aquash was a government informant. Looking Cloud, along with Theda Nelson Clarke and John 'John Boy Patton' Graham, force Aquash into the back of a car and drive her to a remote part of the Pine Ridge Indian Reservation. Clarke drove from Denver, Colorado to the scene of the shooting on the Pine Ridge Indian Reservation in her red Pinto. Aquash was shot execution style in the back of the head and left to die. Her body was discovered on February 24, 1976 on the Pine Ridge Indian Reservation at the bottom of a ravine located in close proximity to an isolated highway. Aquash was revealed to have been executed using a gun, as the autopsy showed that the muzzle of the gun had been pressed into the back of her neck. The coroner's report indicated that in addition to the fatal gunshot wound, exposure contributed to the death of Aquash.

=== Court ===
Conroy-Rios was indicted on September 9, 2009 on one count of felony murder for kidnapping and one count of premeditated murder to Anna Mae Aquash, with a trial scheduled for November. Rios agreed to a plea deal which allowed her to avoid going to trial on murder charges, which resulted in her pleading guilty to acting as an accessory in the kidnapping of Aquash, and as a result, was sentenced to serve five years in prison. Rios admitted that Aquash was kept at her home in Rapid City, South Dakota, then taken to the Pine Ridge Indian Reservation. Judge Delaney of South Dakota suspended the five-year maximum sentence and instead ordered 90 days in jail, which Rios had served while waiting to be released on bond. In a plea agreement, Rios indicated that she overheard two other people who wanted Aquash to be killed, but these names were redacted from court documents. Prosecutors and defense attorneys requested that Conroy-Rios' plea agreement be sealed, which approved and carried out by the judge.

== Death ==
On Wednesday, February 9, 2011, Rios died at 4:30 P.M. DST Wednesday of complications from lung cancer in Rapid City, South Dakota at the Rapid City Regional Hospital. Attorney Matt Kinney revealed that Rios had been diagnosed with lung cancer shortly after the negotiation of her plea agreement.

== Legacy ==
Before her death, Rios provided names of individuals outside of her accomplices who partook in the orchestration of the murder of Anna Mae Aquash. Although Conroy-Rios died before being able to share the information in its totality, Attorney General of South Dakota Marty Jackley has access to her sworn statement and indicated that case is not over.

== See also ==
- Darlene Ka-Mook Nichols
