= Richard Two Elk =

American journalist

- Two Elk
- Born: 1952 (age 73–74); Rapid City, South Dakota, US
- Citizenship: American Indian
- Occupations: Combat veteran Activist; Medical NCO; Radio Host; Educational consultant Journalist
- Years active: 1973–present
- Organization: American Indian Movement
- Known for: Wounded Knee incident
- Relatives: Aaron Two Elk (biological brother); Arlo Looking Cloud (adopted brother); Kodid (daughter); Alix (son)
- Website: Two Elk Enterprise

Richard Two Elk is a Native American combat veteran, journalist and civil rights activist. He is perhaps best known for participation in the Wounded Knee incident in the 1970s and for being a radio host.

== Early life ==
Richard Two Elk was born in Rapid City, South Dakota, and spent his life growing up in different parts of the United States. Two Elk is a direct descendant of Oglala Dakota Chief Two Elk. Richard's brother, Aaron Two Elk, also served in the military during Vietnam and was the president of an Atlanta-based organization, American Land Struggles in Atlanta, and participated as a longtime member of the American Indian Movement. An obituary indicated that Aaron Two Elk died on 5 March 1994 after suffering a massive coronary on 4 March 1999, went into a state of coma and contracted pneumonia while in the hospital.

== Career ==
Two Elk's career in public radio began in 1977 on a weekly Native American radio program on Pacifica Radio station KPFA-FM in Berkeley, California. When he returned to Boulder, Colorado in the fall of 1978, he collaborated with Native American students to develop a Native American radio program at KGNU-FM. He remained with the station until 1983, when he enlisted in the United States Army. Two Elk served in the army from 1983 to 1987 as a medical non-commissioned officer. After serving in the military, Two Elk has been affiliated with KGNU on a casual basis since 1990, and hosted "WinterCamp Chronicles: Indian Voices of Our Times" once a month on KGNU over the past 2 years. Two Elk has also established his own Multimedia Production company, OG Productions.

== Activism ==
Richard Two Elk was a member of the Denver chapter of the American Indian Movement. He was a member of the organization from 1970 to 1975, but stopped being an active member because "he did not feel like being used anymore."

At some point during the Wounded Knee incident, Richard Two Elk came into contact with civil rights activist Ray Robinson. Although Robinson was declared legally dead, the whereabouts of his body still remain unknown. Robinson's death was attributed to an inability to follow orders. AIM member Richard Two Elk stated about the incident that, "He would eat what little food we had. There was no food so everyone was trying not to eat and this guy was eating freely all the time." Of her husband, Cheryl claimed that, "Ray did not respond well to that authoritative direction." Richard Two Elk also claimed that Robinson was actually the aggressor in the incident that led to Ray being shot. "I think it was just a reaction. He jumped up and he had a knife and started moving and someone reacted. It happened in a couple of seconds. I think it was someone's gut level reaction in the middle of a firefight." Two Elk also alleged that Dennis Banks, founder of the American Indian Movement, ordered members (including Richard) around the Easter holiday, to 'take care' of a White guy who was suspected of being an informant. The White male was tied to a cross in a mock crucifixion style, beat the man and the man was led away, never to be seen by Two Elk again.

Two Elk would later provide testimony in the federal trial involving the murder of activist Annie Mae Pictou-Aquash. Richard testified to the fact that Arlo Looking Cloud contacted him around the Fall season of 1994, asking for advice on how to respond to authorities who were investigating the murder, in which Looking Cloud admitted to being involved in the case. Two Elk indicated he believed his adopted brother was involved in Anna Mae's murder, and that over the years, Looking Cloud was only "acting on orders."

Looking Cloud was convicted in the murder of Annie Mae Pictou-Aquash in 2004.

Two Elk would later publish a video entitled "Richard Two Elk on Wounded Knee and the Truth-Hijacked & Blinded: The Stolen Legacy of Wounded Knee," in which he criticizes some of the motivations and actions of the American Indian Movement. He was especially critical of the "Wounded Knee" program/TV series broadcast on PBS network, "We Shall Remain." He referred to the 'Wounded Knee siege' segment as being "arguably the most massaged documentary in history."

== Legacy ==
Two Elk would go on to testify about the events which took place during the Wounded Knee incident. He would write the foreword to the book, American Indian Mafia: An FBI Agent's True Story about Wounded Knee, Leonard Peltier, and the American Indian Movement, authored by Joseph H. Trimbach and John M. Trimbach, which served as a recount of the events which surrounded the Pine Ridge Indian Reservation and the American Indian Movement during the 1970s from the perspective of a former FBI Chief Agent.

== Films ==
- Vow of Silence: The Assassination of Annie Mae (2024) – a 4-episode television series directed and produced by Yvonne Russo
