= Minnie Two Shoes =

Native American journalist

- Two Shoes in 1971 at age 21
- Born: March 24, 1950; Fort Peck Reservation, Montana
- Died: April 9, 2010 (aged 60); Minneapolis, Minnesota
- Citizenship: Assiniboine and Sioux Tribes of the Fort Peck Indian Reservation, United States
- Occupation: Journalist
- Known for: Mentor and activist within Native American community
- Spouse: John Carmichael
- Children: 5

Minnie Two Shoes (March 24, 1950 – April 9, 2010) was a publicist for the American Indian Movement from 1970 to 1976 and worked most of her life in journalism and advancing Native American people and causes.

== Biography ==
Minnie Two Shoes was born on March 24, 1950, at the Fort Peck Reservation in Montana. She was an Assiniboine Sioux. She had five sisters; Jackie Ramuer, Marlee Eder, Marie Knowles, Margie Eder and Beverly Ruella and one brother, Peter Ruella.

In 1983, she received a bachelor's degree in Community Development from the Native American Education Service College in Fort Peck. She also studied at the University of Missouri School of Journalism from 1987 to 1990 where she was a co-founder of the Native American Student Association.

In 1984, she helped found the Native American Press Association which became the Native American Journalists Association in 1990. She co-founded the Wolf Point Traditional Women's Society and edited two magazines: Native Peoples and Aboriginal Voices. She was also a contributing writer for News From Indian Country. She worked with the Wotanin Wowapi at Fort Peck as a writer and columnist for Red Road Home. As a journalist, she wrote about water rights, air quality, the environment, oil, gas and economic development.

She worked as an instructor in communications at the Fort Peck College from 1992 to 1993. She also taught college journalism, and owned a production company.

Along with other leaders in the American Indian Movement, she was featured in the 2002 film The Spirit of Annie Mae. Two Shoes knew Annie Mae Aquash (Annie Mae Pictou-Aquash) personally, and is often cited as being instrumental in uncovering information regarding her murder in 1975.

She was highly regarded as a mentor and activist in her community. In 2010, Ronnie Washines, President of the Native American Journalists Association, said of her, "She was a sincere advocate of the free press, free speech and free food for everyone."

Two Shoes was married to John Carmichael and together they had five children: daughters Pahinskwe Two Shoes and Tateyumniwi Carmichael and sons Honwe Nupa Two Shoes, Peta Tinda Two Shoes and Makbiya Wambli Carmichael.

On April 9, 2010, Minnie Two Shoes died of cancer in Minneapolis, Minnesota. Her husband predeceased her.
