= Ray Robinson (activist) =

African American civil rights movement activist (1937 – c. 1973)

- Born: Perry Ray Robinson; September 12, 1937; Bogue Chitto, Alabama, U.S.
- Disappeared: Approx. April 25, 1973 (aged 35); Pine Ridge Indian Reservation, South Dakota, U.S.
- Status: Missing for 53 years, 4 months and 11 days
- Occupation: Civil rights activist
- Spouse: Cheryl Buswell-Robinson
- Children: 3

Perry Ray Robinson (12 September 1937 – c. 25 April 1973) was an African American activist from Alabama during the civil rights movement. He had been active in Mississippi and Washington, D.C., supporting the March on Washington and the Poor People's Campaign. Robinson disappeared while participating in the 1973 American Indian Movement (AIM) resistance in the Wounded Knee incident on the Pine Ridge Indian Reservation in South Dakota.

Robinson's family never saw him again; his wife believed he was killed at the reservation, and struggled to get his disappearance investigated. In 2014, the Federal Bureau of Investigation (FBI) confirmed that Robinson had been killed and buried on the reservation in April 1973; it released redacted documents to the Robinson family under a Freedom of Information Act suit, including redacted interviews with cooperating witnesses. Robinson was allegedly killed by AIM members during a confrontation, according to the FBI. Robinson's remains have not been found. The FBI said it had closed his case.

== Early life ==
Ray Robinson was born on September 12, 1937, in Washington, DC. He attended local segregated schools. Strong and athletic, Robinson became a prizefighter.

== Activism ==
After leaving boxing, Robinson became a civil rights activist and follower of Martin Luther King, Jr. He participated in the 1963 March on Washington and heard King's noted "I Have a Dream" speech. He also attended the funerals held for James Chaney, Andrew Goodman, and Michael Schwerner, and participated in organizing Resurrection City, a camp set up in 1968 at the National Mall to draw attention to the plight of poor people in the United States.

Robinson was affiliated with Bradford Lyttle, the founder of the United States Pacifist Party. Lyttle said about Robinson, "He was quite forthcoming and very vigorous and willing to take risks. He put himself out in front of the project. And we decided we would take him on into the South." Rose Sanders (since 2003 known as Faya Ora Rose Touré), the first black female judge in the state of Alabama, described Robinson as being called to the civil rights movement: "He was a true soldier. He was a true liberator. He really believed all people should be free."

In the late 1960s, Robinson supported the Vietnam Veterans Against the War (VVAW), organized in 1967. While participating in a 1966 anti-war rally in Madison, Wisconsin, he met Cheryl Buswell; they later married. She had been raised in a Republican household, but dropped out of college to become politically active. Buswell returned with Robinson to Alabama, where they worked in grassroots movements for education and nutrition. They lived in Selma, Alabama, and had three children together from 1967 to 1972.

During a 1973 meeting of VVAW, Robinson learned of the ongoing occupation of Wounded Knee, South Dakota, by American Indian Movement (AIM) activists at the Pine Ridge Reservation to protest federal government policies. AIM was appealing for supporters. According to his wife, Robinson decided to go to the reservation to support the occupation and work to align the rights movements of both groups of people of color. Four African Americans from Alabama went to Pine Ridge; three returned.

== Disappearance ==
Cheryl Robinson never saw her husband again, and filed a missing person's report with the Federal Bureau of Investigation (FBI) when he failed to return home from Wounded Knee. In October 1974, Cheryl traveled to AIM offices in Rapid City, South Dakota, and its headquarters in St. Paul, Minnesota, but was not able to learn much more about her husband's fate. Robinson was later declared legally dead although his burial site has not been discovered, and his body has never been recovered.

In 2011, Buffalo-based attorney Michael Kuzma filed a Freedom of Information Act request with the FBI for records concerning Robinson's disappearance. In 2013, Kuzma filed a lawsuit in the United States District Court for the Western District of New York to gain full access to documents about the case.

== Conflicting accounts ==
Dennis Banks, then a top leader within AIM, said that he had no knowledge of Ray Robinson. He stated that he had never met Robinson and learned of his being at Wounded Knee only through inquiries by his family members. "Over the years, the Robinson name has popped up and I'm not sure even who would have that information or where it was. That's a complete blank to me."

In 2001, Darlene (Ka-Mook) Nichols, formerly Banks' common-law wife in the 1970s, interviewed Banks while trying to learn more about the 1975 murder of AIM activist Anna Mae Aquash. Banks happened to discuss Robinson, saying that he had been shot by another AIM officer after provoking a fight with him and bled to death because the group was under siege and had no way to treat him adequately. Prosecutors declined to follow up on this, in part because it sounded like an accidental killing, and in part because the statute of limitations had expired for anything but first-degree murder. Banks made similar statements in an interview with Indian Country News' in 2007.

Over time, other rumors and information surfaced. At a time of high suspicion of outsiders, many in AIM were said to have believed that Robinson had been an FBI informant. Publisher Paul DeMain reported that a former AIM member described Robinson to him as a "loud mouthed nigger, who refused to pick up a gun during a firefight," making him suspect.

In 2011, AIM leader Carter Camp told Robinson's daughters that the Guardians of the Oglala Nation, commonly known on the reservation as GOONs, killed their father. They had previously been established by a reservation leader who was opposed by many activists. Activist John Trimbach criticized this account for distorting the history of the Wounded Knee incident and failing to provide substantive evidence of the allegations.

In 2013 Robinson's daughter, Tamara Kamara, worked with attorney Michael Kuzma in Buffalo, New York, where she lived, to file a Freedom of Information suit against the FBI and government to force the release of relevant documents. Her mother and remaining family were then living in Detroit, Michigan.

== FBI documents released in 2014 ==
On 11 March 2014, the FBI released documents to Kuzma confirming the death of a black civil rights activist during the 1973 AIM occupation of Wounded Knee. A memorandum from the FBI dated 21 May 1973 reported that an Indian woman who had left the village said there were 200 Indians, eleven whites and two blacks in the occupation. Robinson was reported as having been accompanied to the siege by a black woman. She returned to her hometown, but he disappeared. Kuzma said FBI files included statements that "Robinson had been tortured and murdered within the AIM occupation perimeter, and then his remains were buried 'in the hills.'"

One witness interviewed by FBI agents said that Robinson had been in Wounded Knee for approximately a week before his death. During this time, the witness said that Robinson had trouble adapting to the harsh conditions and discipline imposed under the siege. These conditions included a shortage of food, constant surveillance, regular shootings as the occupation was "under fire," and the unilateral AIM command.

The witness reported that Robinson tried to discuss strategies, but no one listened or gave him any serious consideration. After he got into a heated exchange with another activist, he was escorted to a house by a security team. There, Robinson grabbed a butcher knife from a table and the team gathered around him. The witness said, "The next thing, I heard a loud bang and saw Mr. Robinson's lower leg spin from the knee and rotate outward as he started to fall forward. His eyes rolled up as he went down." The security team is alleged to have consisted of, among other members, Banks, Camp, Leonard Crow Dog, Frank Blackhorse, Stan Holder, Harry David Hill, and Clyde Bellecourt. According to Bernie Lafferty, a witness who confirmed Robinson's presence on the reservation during the Wounded Knee incident, several AIM members openly discussed the murder of a black man whom they had buried on the hillside. These members included Banks, Camp, Holder, Hill, and Russell Means.

Robinson had adopted a non-violent philosophy in his civil rights work. This position put him at odds with AIM, which conducted armed resistance to the federal government. This likely added to existing suspicions of him as an outsider to the Indian movement. The Pine Ridge Reservation had already been disrupted because of severe internal political conflict over the leadership of Richard Wilson.

Years later, AIM member Richard Two Elk described Robinson's behavior: "He would eat what little food we had. There was no food so everyone was trying not to eat and this guy was eating freely all the time." AIM members resented his actions. Cheryl Buswell-Robinson said of her husband, "Ray did not respond well to that authoritative direction." Two Elk said that Robinson was the aggressor at the time he was shot. "I think it was just a reaction. He jumped up and he had a knife and started moving and someone reacted. It happened in a couple of seconds. I think it was someone's gut level reaction in the middle of a firefight." Two Elk also said, "One of the things that was quite apparent was the conflict and the clash of the two concepts of social rights-civil rights and Indian rights. Indian rights are in a whole different context. They (blacks) were coming from rights within the system and Indian rights was about sovereignty and independent nations."

Another account said that Robinson was shot in the knee after the security team entered the bunker. He was dragged outside, beaten and taken to the Wounded Knee Medical Clinic. This was run by Madonna Gilbert Thunderhawk and Lorelei DeCora Means, as well as several other volunteer nurses and medics, including non-Indians. Robinson was reportedly held in a closet, where he bled to death. In correspondence with AIM members, Camp noted that he left Ray in Eagle Bunker after he had Robinson shot in both legs. Camp said, "I had to make the decision not to bring in Buddy Lamont until late afternoon after I knew he was killed in the early morning. I had to leave Ray's life to fight alone in eagle bunker after he was shot through both legs. I did these things to save other Indian lives." Bellecourt, who was at Wounded Knee for 51 days of the siege, said that he had not heard of Robinson during AIM's occupation and only learned of the activist's name in the fall of 2013 after being approached by Robinson's widow.

The late Vernon Bellecourt, older brother of Clyde and leader of an AIM chapter, was said to have known of Robinson's murder during the occupation. He reportedly said at one time that AIM had "really managed to keep a tight lid on that one over the years."

== Legacy ==
Robinson is survived by his widow, Cheryl Buswell-Robinson, and their three children, daughters Desiree Mark and Tamara Kamara, and son J. Marc Robinson.

== Representation in other media ==
The 2009 PBS documentary, We Shall Remain: Wounded Knee, covered AIM during and through the Wounded Knee Incident, as part of a history of Native Americans. This episode was criticized at the time in a six-page letter to PBS management signed by Joseph H. Trimbach, former FBI Special Agent-in-Charge at the time of the events, his son John M. Trimbach, and five Native Americans who had been involved at Wounded Knee; they said AIM violence had not been fully portrayed and noted the allegations about AIM responsibility for Robinson's and others' deaths on the reservation, as well as the 1975 murder of leader Annie Mae Aquash, had been glossed over. (By this time the Trimbachs had published their own book about AIM.) The PBS ombudsman discussed their objections and carried their letter on his webpage on May 20, 2009.

Author Barbara Nixon wrote a book about the events of Wounded Knee, entitled Mi' Taku'Ye-Oyasin: Letters from Wounded Knee (2014). Mi' Taku'Ye-Oyasin is a phrase in Lakota that means "All My Relations," referring to the concept of interconnectedness among the people. It included several letters related to Robinson.

== See also ==
- List of people who disappeared mysteriously: post-1970
- Poor People's Campaign
- Vietnam Veterans Against the War
