= Murder of Wesley Bad Heart Bull =

1973 murder in Buffalo Gap, South Dakota, US

Wesley Bad Heart Bull
- Born: Wesley Charles Bad Heart Bull; June 10, 1952; Pine Ridge Indian Reservation, South Dakota
- Died: January 27, 1973 (aged 20); Buffalo Gap, South Dakota
- Citizenship: American Indian
- Known for: Catalyst for the occupation of Wounded Knee
- Relatives: Amos Bad Heart Bull

Wesley Bad Heart Bull (June 10, 1952 – January 27, 1973) was a Native American man whose murder at the hands of Darld Schmitz was the catalyst for the events later known as the Wounded Knee incident.

== Early life ==
Wesley Charles Bad Heart Bull was born on the Pine Ridge Indian Reservation, South Dakota on 10 June 1952. He was the middle brother of Verlyn Dale 'Butch' Bad Heart Bull (b. 14 July 1949) and Vincent Eli Bad Heart Bull, Jr. (b. 9 March 1955), and older brother to Trina Lynn Bad Heart Bull (b. 5 January 1959), Henry Gerald Bad Heart Bull (b. 18 May 1957), Imogene "April" Bad Heart Bull (b. 7 April 1961), Julie Ann Bad Heart Bull (b. 24 May 1964) as well as older half-brother and first cousin to Jamie Merle Bad Heart Bull (b. 30 September 1966). This was owed to the fact that after Sarah and Vincent Sr. had divorced, Sarah married her brother-in-law, Matthew "Kayo" Bad Heart Bull.

According to Fall River County, South Dakota, sheriff Jack Manke, Bad Heart Bull had a record consisting of 19 arrests, including assault on a police officer, in the past two years and had been jailed in Custer, Hot Springs, South Dakota, and Hill City on assault, disturbing the peace and public intoxication charges.

== Murder ==
On 27 January 1973, John Wesley Bad Heart Bull was stabbed in Buffalo Gap, South Dakota after going to Bill's Bar in Custer, South Dakota. There are conflicting accounts of what events led up to the stabbing.

According to Custer County authorities, some witnesses claimed that Schmitz was acting in self-defense, as Bad Heart Bull had been harassing patrons at Bill's Bar. Witnesses also stated that Bad Heart Bull used his 18-inch logchain to beat a James "Mad Dog" Geary, before Schmitz intervened and inadvertently stabbed him with a knife while trying to push Bad Heart Bull back with his hand. However, a friend of Bad Heart Bull claimed to have heard Schmitz state that "he was going to kill him an Indian." Robert High Eagle, an individual from Hot Springs, who witnessed the murder, stated the stabbing was deliberate and unprovoked. Five minutes later after the alleged statement, and in front of six witnesses (four White and two Indian), Schmitz stabbed Bad Heart Bull. Around 2:00 A.M., Bad Heart Bull lay in the street, bleeding from the wound made by a knife that was still buried in his chest. Bad Heart Bull died from blood loss, while en route to a Hot Springs hospital.

Schmitz was arrested three days after killing Bad Heart Bull and charged with second-degree murder; the Sheriff said there was not enough evidence for the first-degree charge. This charge was the lowest degree charge available to prosecutors at the time. This was the second assault that Schmitz had committed against a Native American. Schmitz was later released on a $5,000.00 bond. One source, The Observer-Reporter, wrote that he was out of jail on a $2,500.00 bond. Schmitz's charge of second degree manslaughter was the lowest degree of homicide a person could be charged with in South Dakota. Schmitz pleaded guilty and spent one day in jail. Though there is some conflicting evidence to his plea due to the acquittal a year later.

== Custer Courthouse riot ==
In response to repeated murders of American Indians by White Americans and lenient punishments issued to the assailants (the most infamous case occurring with Raymond Yellow Thunder), indigenous rights proponents became involved with the Bad Heart Bull case. In January 1973, Dennis Banks proclaimed that AIM members should gather in Rapid City, South Dakota in order to initiate a paramount campaign for civil rights. Sarah Bad Heart Bull, Wesley's mother, contacted the American Indian Movement, known more commonly by the acronym AIM, in order to demonstrate the importance of Native American lives and the disproportionate charges in light of the crime committed. The American Indian Movement staged a protest at the Custer courthouse to put the spotlight on the Bad Heart Bull case.

On 6 February 1973 (one source purports the hearing was to take place on 26 February 1973), Sarah Bad Heart Bull and Robert High Eagle left their homes in Hot Springs, South Dakota and drove to Custer, taking with them Trina Bad Heart Bull, Eddy Clifford and Francis Means, all of whom were present in Buffalo Gap the night Wesley Bad Heart Bull was murdered, to give statements to the Custer County State's Attorney, Hobart H. Gates, and to attend the Schmitz preliminary hearing. On that same day, AIM staged a protest over the "minimum" involuntary manslaughter charge issued to Darrell Schmitz, in Custer, South Dakota. However, the authorities had already made preparations, aided by natural occurrences, by the time AIM members arrived in Custer. There was a heavy snowstorm around Custer prior to the protest. First, an anonymous caller contacted the Rapid City Journal to announce that the demonstration had been canceled, "leading" journalist Lyn Gladstone to incorrectly report that there was no rally being held, causing a much lower turnout. Second, the Custer County authorities postponed the Schmitz preliminary hearing in anticipation of a caravan of American Indian Movement members who would be arriving in Custer on 6 February 1973. There were also other "security measures" which were instituted on behalf of the Schmitz hearing. While the state attorney was present in the clerk of courts' office to meet with any individual who contested his handling of the Schmitz case, no more than 4-5 people were allowed entrance into the courthouse to discuss the matter simultaneously. Guards had been stationed at all exterior doors of the courthouse to screen all persons who wished to enter the courthouse, and various law enforcement officers, such as the State Highway Motor Patrol, were put on stand by in the event of trouble.

In spite of these obstacles, approximately 200 American Indians turned out to protest the murder of Wesley and the lenient charge issued against the man who killed him. Four members of the American Indian Movement, Russell Means, Dennis Banks, Leonard Crow Dog and Harry David Hill, who were chosen by the group as delegates to confer with the state's attorney, were initially denied entry before eventually being allowed to enter the courthouse. However, Hobart refused to raise the charge to murder, and when Russell Means attempted to bring Sarah Bad Heart Bull, mother of the murdered victim into the meeting, both were denied entrance into the courthouse by state troopers. The sheriff blew his whistle as a signal to 90 officers equipped with batons, who advanced upon the crowd. The officers grabbed Sarah Bad Heart Bull, struck her in the face with a baton and started choking Sarah, using a nightstick to force her to the ground. Several people in the crowd rushed to her defense, and a riot subsequently ensued. The Indian people were confronted with a combined force of local, county, and state police tactical units, all of which were being monitored by observers from the Federal Bureau of Investigation. The Indian people who were present at the courthouse were outnumbered four-to-one by police. As chaos enveloped the area, a state trooper threw the mother of the murder victim to the ground. As the protests at the courthouse erupted into riots, police cars and buildings were set on fire. The ensuing struggle resulted in the Custer County Courthouse and the local chamber of commerce building being set ablaze. Police cars were damaged, automobiles were burned, and rocks, wrenches, slabs of concrete and bottles were hurled at the police officers, the courthouse, and other buildings. Pop bottles filled with gasoline were thrown into the courthouse. A flare ignited the gasoline causing the courthouse to catch on fire and be severely damaged. The Custer Chamber of Commerce building located near the courthouse was set on fire and burned to the ground, which, according to Russell Means, was the result of teargas used by the police. The demonstrators also broke the front windows of a nearby Texaco gasoline station and set fire to the building. The Standard Oil bulk station was also set on fire and caused $9,000.00 in damages.

Between 27-30 people of Indian descent were arrested, including Russell Means, Dennis Banks, and Sarah Bad Heart Bull, as well as being charged with riot and arson.

Sarah Bad Heart Bull was convicted of inciting a riot and was sentenced to one to five years in prison. She served five months (one source indicated six months) of her sentence before being released on bail to await a decision on her appeal, when, Schmitz spent no time in prison and was given two months probation instead.

Sarah Bad Heart Bull's release was advocated for by a caravan of defendants of the Custer Courthouse Incident, with defendants like Reginal Dixon-Brave testifying at Sarah's trial. She stated that she sympathized with Sarah's situation and went to Custer in order to get justice for the persecution that Native Americans have been facing for years.

Hill was identified by Thelma Rios, another AIM activist who he lived with, as having provoked the Custer Courthouse Incident. According to Rios-Conroy, "He started it all, Dave. He provoked the riot. He was right there. He told me so, proudly, several times. He instigated that courtroom riot too. I was there. I saw him start it, punching a cop. At the time everybody thought it was great. He was a warrior. He was a hero and everybody trusted him, including me."

Schmitz was acquitted of the second-degree manslaughter charge later that year by an all-White jury.

The murder of Wesley Bad Heart Bull and the subsequent second-degree involuntary manslaughter charge issued to the suspect is cited as the catalyst which led the American Indian Movement to occupy Wounded Knee during the Wounded Knee Incident.

Vincent Eli Bad Heart Bull, Jr., who has been incarcerated since the age of 17, is the only surviving brother of Wesley Bad Heart Bull, and is the subject of an autobiography by Reno author Jacklynn Lord, entitled Custer Court House Incident.

Sarah Jennie Bad Heart Bull, mother of Wesley Bad Heart Bull, died on 18 February 2013, in Cheyenne, Wyoming, at the age of 83.

== See also ==
- Raymond Yellow Thunder
- American Indian Movement
- Wounded Knee incident
