= John Graham (Canadian activist) =

Canadian activist (born 1955)

- Born: John Graham; 1955 (age 70–71)
- Citizenship: Champagne and Aishihik First Nations
- Occupation: Activist
- Organization: American Indian Movement
- Known for: The Native People's Caravan; The Beothuk Patrol; Triggerman in the murder of AIM Activist Anna Mae Aquash
- Children: 8 children
- Parent: Rachael Thompson (Mother)
- Website: John Graham Defense Committee

John Graham (born 1955) is a Canadian, Yukoner, Champagne and Aishihik First Nations citizen, and former Native American activist. He is best known for being convicted for the murder of fellow American Indian Movement activist Anna Mae Aquash.

== Early life ==
Graham was born in Whitehorse, Yukon, Canada and is a member of the Southern Tutchone Champagne and Aishihik First Nations people. One source indicates that Graham is from Haines Junction, Yukon.

== Personal life ==
John Graham is a father of eight and former resident of Vancouver, British Columbia.

== Career ==
Graham is a long-term member of the American Indian Movement.

In 1974, when Graham was 17, he participated in the Native Peoples' Caravan from Vancouver to Ottawa, an unauthorized occupation event in which 300 participants from the Caravan moved into the abandoned Carbide Mill building on Victoria Island, behind the Parliament buildings in Ottawa, for 5 months. Graham was also active in protest throughout other Canadian provinces. In Vancouver, Graham also participated as a member the Beothuck Patrol, a First Nations group which conducted street level monitoring of police harassment.

In June 1980, the Caravan for Survival, which included Graham as a protester, consisted of who drove from Regina, the capital city of Saskatchewan, to the northern Saskatchewan uranium boom town of La Ronge to protest the opening of government-operated Key Lake Uranium Mine Board of Inquiry.

Following the conclusion of the Native Peoples' Caravan, Graham took part in his first armed occupation when he traveled to the state of New York group to provide support (as general security) to the Mohawk land re-occupation at Ganienkeh, also known as Eagle Lake.

During the summer 1981, the AIM Survival Group opened the Anne Mae Aquash Survival Camp near the community of Pinehouse, located in northern Saskatchewan, on the Key Lake road, which was done to create a forum in which Native rights issues and the problems of the uranium industry could be openly discussed. Graham was one of the people at the camp.

During the months of May and June in 1984, Graham spoke throughout Europe, on a tour organized by European anti-nuclear, Native rights and environmental groups to raise awareness of the impact of uranium mining in Canada on Indigenous Canadians.

== Legal history ==
=== Murder of Anna Mae Aquash ===
Anna Mae Pictou-Aquash was a prominent voice and leading activist within the ranks of the American Indian Movement.

On 12 December 1975, Aquash was forced out of the home of Denver AIM activist Troy Lynn S. Yellow Wood despite the latter's objection that something bad would happen to Aquash. Aquash was then forcefully taken to an apartment in Rapid City owned by Russell Means' brother, where she was interrogated and, prosecutors charge, held captive, tortured and raped by Graham.

Looking Cloud, one of Graham's and Nelson-Clark's accomplices, said he heard Graham and Aquash "having sex" in the bedroom of a Rapid City apartment (whose ownership is attributed to Thelma Rios and her mother); the prosecution charges that Graham raped Aquash. Looking Cloud waited outside of the room while Graham raped Aquash, and Graham acknowledged in a taped interview/interrogation that Looking Cloud waited outside of the room where Anna Mae was imprisoned.

Aquash was then forcefully moved to the Rosebud Indian Reservation where AIM supporters refused to house her. Looking Cloud, along with Theda Nelson Clarke and Graham, forced Aquash into the back of a car and drove her to a remote part of the Pine Ridge Indian Reservation, where Aquash was shot execution style in the back of the head and left to die. Her body was located nearly two months later on 24 February 1976 on the Pine Ridge Indian Reservation at the bottom of a ravine located in close proximity to an isolated highway. Aquash was revealed to have been murdered with a firearm, as the autopsy showed that the muzzle of the gun had been pressed into the back of her neck. The coroner's report indicated that in addition to the fatal gunshot wound, exposure caused the death of Aquash, as her body was frozen by the time it was discovered.

=== Arrest ===
On 30 March 2003, Graham was charged with the 1975 first-degree murder/pre-meditated murder of Anna Mae in the United States. Because Graham was a resident of Vancouver at the time, the case required Graham's extradition. On 1 December 2003, Graham was arrested in Vancouver for the murder of Pictou-Aquash, and his bail was set at $50,000.00.

Graham resisted extradition, and despite being put under house arrest in December 2003, he filed an appeal within British Columbia to keep the case from moving forward. On 23 June 2006, the presiding judge extended Graham's bail to 23 June 2006, giving Graham's lawyer, Terry LaLiberte time to file an appeal following the British Columbia Supreme Court's decision to extradite Graham. Graham lost the appeal, had his bail revoked and he was taken to jail to await extradition, which happened on 6 December 2007.

=== United States v. Graham ===
John Graham was charged in the United States on 30 March 2003 with the 1975 first-degree murder/pre-meditated murder of Anna Mae. After protracted litigation in the federal courts, the federal premeditated murder charge was dismissed in United States v. Graham, 572 F.3d 954 (8th Cir.2009).

=== State of South Dakota v. Graham ===
However, before Graham could return to Canada, he was indicted by a Pennington County grand jury on state charges of premeditated murder and felony murder. The underlying felony was alleged to be the kidnapping of Aquash.

On 2 December 2010, South Dakota Judge John Delaney forbade any mention of a finding in the first autopsy report for Aquash that suggests she may have had sex shortly before her death to jurors, a finding which prosecutors said originated from Graham allegedly raping Aquash during her kidnapping.

On 3 December 2010, Nichols-Ecoffey testified that an AIM activist later convicted of killing two FBI agents made an "incriminating" statement in front of her and Aquash, who was later shot and killed. Nichols-Ecoffey claimed that Peltier "said the motherfucker was begging for his life, but [Peltier] shot him anyway." Ecoffey, the former common-law wife of AIM leader Dennis Banks, was forbidden by Circuit Court Judge John Delaney from telling jurors exactly what she alleges group member Leonard Peltier told her six months before Aquash was killed. The judge deemed it hearsay. But under questioning from prosecutors, she was allowed to say that Peltier made an "incriminating" statement.

Graham was convicted of felony murder on 10 December 2010 after jurors heard evidence that he aided in the abduction of Aquash from Denver in December 1975. Graham was sentenced to minimum mandatory life in prison for the murder.

=== 2012 appeal ===
Graham continued to maintain his innocence and attempted to secure an appeal that would grant him a release from prison. The South Dakota Supreme Court heard oral arguments regarding his 2010 conviction on 19 March 2012 in Vermillion, South Dakota. Graham's attorney, John Murphy, argued that the government should not have had the authority to transfer his case from federal to state jurisdiction following his extradition to the US, the South Dakota Supreme Court ruled that the state was within its rights to prosecute Graham, there was sufficient evidence to convict Graham, and his life-sentence imprisonment without parole was commensurate with the crime committed. The South Dakota Supreme Court thus dismissed the John Graham Appeal. Graham is currently incarcerated at the South Dakota State Penitentiary in Sioux Falls, South Dakota.

=== 2018 appeal ===
On 30 March 2018, Graham appealed his conviction to the United States Court of Appeals for the Eighth Circuit on the premise that, "the court lacked jurisdiction over him because he is a Canadian citizen whose extradition allegedly violated a treaty". Graham's legal defense argued that his 2011 conviction in South Dakota was for felony murder, a crime which does not exist in Canada, and a crime that was not mentioned his extradition request. However, the Eighth Circuit ultimately upheld Graham's conviction, and his appeal was denied. The three-judge panel concurred that felony murder was not written in the original extradition request authored by the United States. However, the subsequent waiver issued by Canada expanded the authority of the extradition, and, based on the Eight Circuit Court's opinion, it is beyond the Eighth Circuit's jurisdiction to interpret Canadian laws.

== Aftermath ==
Graham's trial and sentencing have been the subject of both scrutiny and controversy, with independent bloggers and activists writing pieces in support, or advancing alternate theories about the crimes Graham has been convicted of. Some have written that Graham claimed he and his family were visited several times in the Yukon during the 1990s, and allegedly threatened that he would be charged with murder if he did not implicate AIM leadership in the murder.

Following Graham's extradition to the United States, the John Graham Defense Committee was formed. The organization's intent is to prove his innocence. Despite Looking Cloud's plea bargain which involved testifying against John Graham in exchange for a reduction in his prison sentence, the Graham Defense Committee indicated that it would help Looking Cloud form a legal appeals team. According to a representative from the Graham Defense Committee, in addition to Looking Cloud's conviction being based on a lack of forensic evidence, they also indicated that, "Yet the Graham Defense committee will help form a legal appeals team for Looking Cloud. Why help him when he implicated John? We don't believe he intended to implicate John."

== See also ==
- American Indian Movement
- Arlo Looking Cloud
- Theda Nelson Clarke
- Darlene Nichols
- Annie Mae Pictou-Aquash
- Uranium mining and the Navajo people
