= Theda Nelson Clarke =

Native American activist

- Born: Theda Rose Nelson; 1924; South Dakota
- Died: October 8, 2011 (aged 87); Crawford, Nebraska
- Resting place: Crawford Cemetery
- Citizenship: American Indian
- Occupations: Activist, FBI Informant
- Years active: 1973–2011
- Organization(s): American Indian Movement; PIE Patrol
- Known for: Participant in the murder of AIM Activist Anna Mae Aquash
- Spouse(s): Edward Lamar Clarke (ex-husband); Julian Pokrywka (ex-husband)
- Children: Edward "Chip" Samuel Clarke (son); Ida Rose Clarke (daughter); Michael Patrick Clarke (son)
- Relatives: Russell Means (biological nephew); Troy Lynn Yellow Wood-Williams (biological niece)

Theda Nelson Clarke, born Theda Rose Nelson (1924-2011), was a Native American activist. She is perhaps best known for her involvement in the Wounded Knee incident and the murder of fellow American Indian Movement activist Anna Mae Aquash.

== Early life ==
Clarke was born Theda Rose Nelson in 1924. According to Census records, Theda R. Nelson was born in the state of South Dakota.

Clarke lived in Scottsbluff, Nebraska at the time, and was the matriarch of a large tiyóšpaye (family), leading to her being designated 'aunt' and 'auntie' by many in the community, including Troy Lynn Yellow Wood and future accomplice in the murder of Anna Mae Aquash, John Graham.

Theda Nelson Clarke was aunt (whether this familial affiliation was biological or adopted is unclear) to Darlene Nichols (whom Nichols grew up with), a key material witness in the murder trials of Arlo Looking Cloud and John Graham for their roles in the murder of AIM activist Anna Mae Pictou-Aquash.

In the early 1940s, Clarke graduated from the St. Francis Indian School in St. Francis, South Dakota.

== Personal life ==
Theda Rose Nelson eventually married Edward Lamar Clarke, and had three children with him: Edward "Chip" Samuel Clarke (born September 23, 1962), Ida Rose Clarke (born December 22, 1963) and Patrick Michael Clarke (born September 6, 1965). Theda and Edward eventually divorced.

Clarke also married a Julian Pokrywka, although it does not appear that they were married at the time of their death.

== Activism ==
Clark was a member of the Pie Patrol, a group of women active in AIM, consisting of Madonna Gilbert, Lorelei DeCora, Thelma Rios-Conroy, and other women within the AIM movement. and Lorelei DeCora Means. Mary Crow Dog (née Moore), wife of civil rights activist Leonard Crow Dog, who was also present during the siege at Wounded Knee, referred to the Pie Patrol as "loud-mouth city women, media conscious and hugging the limelight," who loved the camera and took credit for what the women of AIM were doing behind the scenes.

== Legal history ==
=== Murder of Anna Mae Aquash ===
Anna Mae Pictou-Aquash was a female activist within the ranks of the American Indian Movement.

On December 12, 1975, Aquash was then forcefully moved to the Rosebud Indian Reservation where AIM supporters refused to house her. Looking Cloud later testified that Clarke was given orders to have Anna Mae eliminated. Looking Cloud, along with Theda Nelson Clarke and John 'John Boy Patton' Graham, forced Aquash into the back of a car and drove her to a remote part of the Pine Ridge Indian Reservation. Clarke drove from Denver, Colorado to the scene of the shooting on the Pine Ridge Indian Reservation in her red Pinto. Aquash was shot execution style in the back of the head and left to die. Her body was discovered on February 24, 1976 on the Pine Ridge Indian Reservation at the bottom of a ravine located in close proximity to an isolated highway. Aquash was revealed to have been executed using a gun, as the autopsy showed that the muzzle of the gun had been pressed into the back of her neck. The coroner's report indicated that in addition to the fatal gunshot wound, exposure contributed to the death of Aquash.

== Death ==
Clarke died on October 8, 2011, at the age of 87 in a nursing home in Crawford, Nebraska. She was predeceased by her ex-husband, Edward Lamar Clarke, and two of her children, Edward Lamar Clarke and Ida Rose Clarke.

== Legacy ==
Her only surviving child is Edward "Chip" Samuel Clarke.

In December, Clarke was ruled competent to testify in John Graham's trial. But she exercised her Fifth Amendment right not to incriminate herself in the presence of a jury and deferred the option of testifying under immunity.
