= Arlo Looking Cloud =

Former Native American activist

- Born: Fritz Arlo Looking Cloud; March 25, 1954 (age 72); Pine Ridge Indian Reservation, South Dakota, U.S.
- Occupation: Activist
- Years active: 1973–present
- Organization: American Indian Movement
- Known for: Murder of AIM Activist Anna Mae Aquash
- Relatives: American Horse (relative); Johnny Looking Cloud (father); Joe American Horse, Sr. (grandfather); Richard Two Elk (adopted brother)
- Website: Friends and Supporters of Arlo Looking Cloud

Arlo Looking Cloud (born Fritz Arlo Looking Cloud; March 25, 1954) is an American former activist. He is best known for his involvement in the murder of fellow American Indian Movement activist Anna Mae Aquash. He was convicted of her murder and sentenced to life in prison. However, in 2011, his sentence was reduced to 20 years as a reward for his testimony against his codefendant, John Graham. Looking Cloud was released from prison in 2020.

== Early life ==
Looking Cloud is a Lakota Sioux who grew up on the Pine Ridge Indian Reservation.

== Legal history ==
=== Murder of Anna Mae Aquash ===
Anna Mae Pictou-Aquash was a female activist within the ranks of the American Indian Movement. On 12 December 1975, Looking Cloud, along with Theda Nelson Clarke and John "John Boy Patton" Graham, forced Aquash into the back of a car and drove her to a remote part of the Pine Ridge Indian Reservation, where Aquash was shot execution style in the back of the head and left to die. Her body was discovered on 24 February 1976 on the Pine Ridge Indian Reservation at the bottom of a ravine located in close proximity to an isolated highway.

Aquash was revealed to have been shot dead; the muzzle of the gun had been pressed into the back of her neck, as the autopsy revealed. The coroner's report indicated that in addition to the fatal gunshot wound, exposure contributed to the death of Aquash.

=== Arrest ===
On 27 March 2003, Looking Cloud, who was a 49-year-old homeless man, was seen walking down Colfax Avenue by Denver police detective, Abe Alonzo. Looking Cloud was subsequently arrested on a warrant issued by federal authorities in South Dakota, in which Looking Cloud and another man were accused of shooting Pictou-Aquash during a kidnapping in December 1975 near Wanblee, South Dakota.

==== United States v. Looking Cloud ====
Darlene Nichols testified that Leonard Peltier, an AIM activist who was convicted of killing two FBI agents in the Pine Ridge Shootout (officially designated RESMURS by the FBI), told her and Aquash that he killed two FBI agents during a June 1975 shootout at a Pine Ridge ranch. According to Ecoffey's testimony, "He said the (expletive) [sic] was begging for his life, but I shot him anyway." According to Nichols-Ecoffey, she, along with Leonard Peltier, her sisters Bernie Nichols-Lafferty and Barbara Robideau, then-husband Dennis Banks and others were riding in a recreational vehicle lent to the American Indian Movement by the Hollywood actor Marlon Brando when Peltier recounted this event. Nichols also testified to how she had heard Peltier say he thought Aquash was a snitch.

During the trial, Nichols testified as to several incidents of violence involving the American Indian Movement. Three of these incidents, The Custer Courthouse Riot Incident which involved several hundred people, the seventy-one day occupation of Wounded Knee, and a shoot-out near her home which killed two FBI agents. Nichols also discussed suspicions nearly twenty members of the American Indian Movement had of Aquash being an informant, or were at least acquainted with the rumor. Nichols also testified that several members, one of whom had already threatened Aquash's life because he suspected she was an informant, took Aquash away for weeks to "watch her," explaining that she was constantly under the surveillance of the American Indian Movement, was not allowed to go anywhere alone, and was not permitted to go home despite her requests to do so. Mathalene White Bear, another former member of the American Indian Movement who provided shelter to Aquash in 1975, testified that Aquash believed her life was in danger as early as September of that year. Darlene Nichols testified that Leonard Crow Dog and Leonard Peltier thought Aquash was an informant, and that Nichols, her daughter, and Dennis Banks, heard Peltier say he thought Aquash was an informant.

For his involvement in the murder of Aquash, Looking Cloud confessed that he drove Aquash from Denver to Rapid City and then to the location where Aquash was murdered; however, he alleged that he knew nothing of the plan to execute Aquash, and that it was AIM member John Graham, alias John Boy Patton, who shot Aquash.

Richard Two Elk would later provide testimony in the federal trial involving the murder of Aquash. Two Elk provided testimony which indicated that Arlo Looking Cloud contacted him around the autumn of 1994, asking for advice on how to respond to authorities who were investigating Aquash's murder, and Two Elk stated that Looking Cloud admitted to being involved in the case. Two Elk stated that he believed his adopted brother was involved in the murder of Aquash and that over the years, Looking Cloud was only "acting on orders."

In February 2004, after a federal jury (consisting of 7 women and 5 men) deliberated for seven hours, they convicted Arlo Looking Cloud in the 1975 execution-style slaying of Aquash.

==== Appeal ====
In 2005, Looking Cloud appealed the verdict to the United States Eighth Circuit Court of Appeals, but the appeal was struck down and his mandatory life prison term life-sentence was upheld and affirmed.

==== Plea deal ====
In August 2011, U.S. District Judge Lawrence Piersol signed an order which reduced Looking Cloud's original life-sentence term to 20 years in exchange for previous testimony given to state prosecutors during December 2010 against co-conspirator John Graham. Looking Cloud's testimony provided further insight into the murder of Aquash, with Looking Cloud alleging that he stood nearby while Graham shot Aquash. Looking Cloud was assigned BOP# 07609-073 and released from FTC Oklahoma City on November 10, 2020.

== Legacy ==
The court proceedings against Looking Cloud have left lingering divisions. There are some factions who believe that Looking Cloud was innocent. According to Russell Means, American Indian Movement member, racism was at the heart the federal jury conviction of Looking Cloud. He was quoted as saying, "Racism continues. Our culture is disregarded and not included, and one of the most pathetic men in the city of Denver is given the sole responsibility for the murder ordered by a leader of the American Indian Movement. I'm just thoroughly disgusted and supremely disappointed."

Looking Cloud alleges he was given alcohol and heroin prior to having a confession coerced out of him.

On 28 April 2005, in a handwritten letter, Looking Cloud alleged that his trial attorney, Timothy Rensch, conspired with Bruce Ellison, an attorney for Leonard Peltier. According to Looking Cloud, "I received a letter informing me that Vernon B. Bellecourt provided all my legal material in my case to Laliberte [Graham's attorney] in Canada, apparently getting it from Gilbert Arlo's appeal attorney. And I read Vernon and Gilbert go way back. And how hard Rensch worked to make sure Candy Hamilton couldn't mention Bruce Ellison's name. Rensch, his former law partner Leech and Ellison go way back." According to Barry Bacharach, an attorney for Peltier, the testimony used to convict Looking Cloud was not based on proof or evidence of Looking Cloud for wrongdoing, but based on testimony which focused primarily on leaders and prominent activists within the American Indian Movement, Peltier included.

Similarly, Looking Cloud's court-appointed attorney, Timothy Rensch, was criticized for not putting a better defense together for Looking Cloud. In his appeal for a new trial, Looking Cloud also included in his appeal a new attorney, but it was also denied.

And despite Looking Cloud's plea bargain which involved exchanging testimony against John Graham, the Graham Defense Committee indicated that it would help Looking Cloud form a legal appeals team. According to a representative from the Graham Defense Committee, in addition to Looking Cloud's conviction being based on a lack of forensic evidence, they also indicated that, "Yet the Graham Defense committee will help form a legal appeals team for Looking Cloud. Why help him when he implicated John? We don't believe he intended to implicate John."
