= Vow of Silence: The Assassination of Annie Mae =

American documentary series

- Genre: Documentary
- Directed by: Yvonne Russo
- Country of origin: United States
- Original language: English
- No. of episodes: 4

Production
- Executive producers: Amy Kaufman; Riva Marker; Ezra Edelman; Caroline Waterlow
- Producer: Yvonne Russo
- Production companies: Onyx Collective; Laylow Pictures; Nine Stories Productions

Original release
- Network: Hulu
- Release: November 26, 2024

Vow of Silence: The Assassination of Annie Mae is an American documentary series directed and produced by Yvonne Russo. It follows the life and murder of Anna Mae Aquash, a First Nations activist and Mi'kmaq tribal member from Nova Scotia, Canada who moved to Boston in 1962.

It premiered on November 26, 2024, on Hulu.

== Premise ==
The film explores the life and murder of Annie Mae Aquash, who fought for Indigenous rights in the 1960s and 1970s, with her murder going unsolved for 30 years. It also explores politics in the 1970s, and chronicles a present-day investigation by Aquash's daughter.

== Production ==
In August 2022, it was announced Onyx Collective had greenlit a documentary series then titled Ring of Fire: The Life of Annie Mae Aquash revolving around Anna Mae Aquash, with Yvonne Russo set to direct. The series additionally received a grant from the International Documentary Association, and support from The Redford Center.
