= Anna Mae Aquash =

First Nations activist (1945–1975)

Annie Mae Aquash
- Naguset Eask
- Born: March 27, 1945; Shubenacadie, Nova Scotia
- Died: mid-December 1975. (age 30) (Note: Date was initially wrong, and then disputed, until testimony at murder trial made details public.); Body found along Highway 73 at Wanblee in the Pine Ridge Indian Reservation, South Dakota, February 1976
- Known for: Activism with the American Indian Movement

Annie Mae Aquash (Mi'kmaq name Naguset Eask) (March 27, 1945 – mid-December 1975) was a First Nations activist and Mi'kmaq tribal member from Nova Scotia, Canada. Aquash moved to Boston in the 1960s and joined other First Nations and Indigenous Americans focused on education, resistance, and police brutality against urban Indigenous peoples. She was a member of the American Indian Movement (AIM) and participated in several occupations with them. In December 1975, she was kidnapped and murdered in the Pine Ridge Indian Reservation by members of AIM. Her body was later found in February 1976. In the 2000s, several members of AIM were convicted of kidnapping and murdering her.

In 1973, as part of AIM, she participated in the Wounded Knee Occupation at the Pine Ridge Indian Reservation. Aquash had also participated in the 1972 Trail of Broken Treaties and occupation of the Department of Interior headquarters in Washington, DC. In the following years, Aquash was active in protests to draw positive government action and acknowledgement of First Nations and Native American civil rights in Canada and the United States.

Aquash disappeared in late December 1975, leading to rumors that she had been assassinated. On February 24, 1976, Aquash's body was found in Wanblee on the Pine Ridge Indian Reservation in South Dakota. She was determined to have died from exposure by a Bureau of Indian Affairs medical examiner. But a second autopsy two weeks later concluded that she had been murdered by an execution-style gunshot to the head. Initially, her death was covered up, and the body declared to be "unidentifiable." Aquash was thirty years old at the time of her murder and had two young daughters, Debbie and Denise.

After decades of investigation and the hearing of testimony by three federal grand juries, in March 2003, AIM members Arlo Looking Cloud and John Graham were indicted for the murder of Aquash. Looking Cloud was convicted in 2004 and Graham in 2010; both received life sentences. Thelma Rios was indicted along with John Graham, but she pleaded guilty to charges as an accessory to the kidnapping. In 2008 Vine Richard "Dick" Marshall was charged with aiding the murder, but was acquitted of providing the gun. Numerous Aquash supporters and her daughters believe that higher-level AIM officials, including Leonard Peltier, ordered her murder, fearing she was an FBI informant.

== Early life and education ==
Annie Mae Pictou was born on March 27, 1945 into the Mi'kmaq First Nation at Indian Brook Reserve in Shubenacadie, Nova Scotia. Her mother was Mary Ellen Pictou and her father Francis Thomas Levi. She had two older sisters, Mary and Becky Pictou, and a younger brother Francis. In early childhood they lived in the wilderness in a wigwam. When the children were abandoned there, rescuers took them to the reservation for care. Pictou and her siblings received their early educations on the reserve but struggled with poverty throughout their early lives. At the age of eight, Pictou had tuberculosis in the eyes and lungs.

== Marriage and family ==
In 1962, Pictou was 17 years old when she moved with James Maloney from the reserve to Boston. They had two daughters together, Denise, born in June 1964, and Debbie, born in September 1965. They married that year. They divorced in mid-1970 after Pictou found Maloney was having an affair.

Pictou later married Nogeeshik Aquash, an Ojibwa activist, in a Native ceremony on April 12, 1973. She kept his last name after they separated.

== Activism ==
In Boston, Pictou began to meet urban American Indians and other First Nations people from Canada. About 1968–1969, she met members of the American Indian Movement (AIM), founded in Minneapolis in 1968. They were organizing among urban Indians, initially to combat police discrimination and brutality against their people. Pictou became involved in the Teaching and Research in Bicultural Education School Project (TRIBES), a program in Bar Harbor, Maine to teach young American Indians about their history.

On Thanksgiving Day 1970, AIM activists in Boston held a major protest against the Mayflower II celebration at the harbor by boarding and seizing the ship. Pictou helped create the Boston Indian Council (now the North American Indian Center of Boston), to work to improve conditions for Indians in the city.

In 1972, Pictou participated in the Trail of Broken Treaties march of American Indian activists to Washington, D.C. Protesters occupied the Bureau of Indian Affairs national headquarters and presented a list of 20 demands to the government, 12 of them dealing with treaty issues. In Boston, Pictou met Nogeeshik Aquash, from Walpole Island, Canada, and they began a relationship.

In 1973, Nogeeshik and Anna Mae traveled together to the Pine Ridge Indian Reservation in South Dakota to join AIM activists and Oglala Lakota in resistance to internal issues. Federal law enforcement became involved in what developed as the activists' 71-day occupation of Wounded Knee, which ended on May 8, 1973.

The couple were married there in a Native ceremony by Wallace Black Elk, a Lakota elder. Anna Mae took Aquash as her surname, and she kept it after they later separated.

"These white people think this country belongs to them," Aquash wrote in a letter to her sister at the time. "The whole country changed with only a handful of raggedy-ass pilgrims that came over here in the 1500s. And it can take a handful of raggedy-ass Indians to do the same, and I intend to be one of those raggedy-ass Indians." On her first night in South Dakota, [Dennis] Banks told her that newcomers were needed on kitchen duty. "Mr. Banks," she replied, "I didn't come here to wash dishes. I came here to fight."

Using the surname Aquash, in 1974 Annie Mae was based mostly in Minneapolis. She worked on the Red Schoolhouse project, for a culturally based school for the numerous American Indian students who lived in the city.

That year she also participated in the armed occupation at Anicinabe Park in Kenora, Ontario by Ojibwe activists and AIM supporters. They were protesting treatment of the Ojibwe in Kenora and northwestern Ontario in relation to health, police harassment, education and other issues, and failures by the national government's Office of Indian Affairs to improve conditions. Aquash also continued to work for the Elders and Lakota People of the Pine Ridge Indian Reservation.

In January 1975, Aquash worked with the Menominee Warriors Society in the month-long armed occupation of the Alexian Brothers Novitiate at Gresham, Wisconsin. The Catholic abbey had been closed and abandoned, and the Menominee wanted the property returned to the tribe, as the land had originally been appropriated by the Alexian Brothers for their mission. That year, Aquash was arrested twice on federal weapons-related charges, but was quickly released. Her second release was shortly before she was assassinated.

Aquash's releases from jail heightened internal AIM suspicions, created by a disinformation campaign, that Aquash might be a government informant. Leaders were nervous since they had discovered on March 12, 1975, that Douglas Durham, a prominent member who by then had been appointed as head of security for AIM, was an FBI informant. Durham had gained the trust of leaders in AIM over the two years he went undetected. He created his false appearance by, "dyeing his hair black, wearing contact lenses and adopting the AIM-style dress - ribbon shirts, turquoise and silver jewellery and beadwork." Aquash had suspected and denounced Durham. The officials expelled him from AIM in March 1975 at a public press conference.

According to biographer Johanna Brand, by the spring of 1975, Aquash was "recognized and respected as an organizer in her own right and was taking an increasing role in the decision-making of AIM policies and programs." She was close to AIM leaders Leonard Peltier and Dennis Banks. She and Banks had developed an intimate relationship beginning in the summer of 1974, although he was in a common-law marriage with another woman.

When Banks went into hiding, Aquash and Darlene (Ka-Mook) Nichols joined him at various times in late 1975 as he, along with Peltier and others, moved throughout the West for several months in an R.V. lent by actor Marlon Brando, an AIM sympathizer. According to Ka-Mook Nichols, while camping in Washington in October 1975, Peltier bragged to her, Annie Mae and others about shooting the two FBI agents on June 26, 1975.

On November 14, 1975, while they were heading south through Oregon, a state trooper pulled over the R.V., full of guns and explosives, and ordered everybody out. Peltier and Banks escaped, but Kenny Loud Hawk, Russ Redner, Aquash, and others were taken to jail.

After having spent ten days in jail, Annie Mae Aquash was released on bail in Pierre, South Dakota on November 24. A couple of days later, she went to stay at the home of Troy Lynn Yellow Wood-Williams in Denver, Colorado. After having been seen in Denver and Rapid City, South Dakota for the last time on December 11, she disappeared in mid-December 1975.

== Murder ==
On February 24, 1976, rancher Roger Amiotte found Aquash's body by the side of State Road 73 in the northeast corner of the reservation, about 10 miles (16 km) from Wanblee, South Dakota. Her remains were revealed when snow melted in February. An autopsy was conducted by medical practitioner W. O. Brown, on behalf of the Bureau of Indian Affairs, which had jurisdiction in the case. He wrote: "it appears she had been dead for about 10 days," and she had "died from frost." Failing to notice a bullet wound at the base of her skull, Brown concluded that "she had died of exposure." Under FBI orders, according to In the Spirit of Crazy Horse, Aquash's hands were cut off and sent for fingerprinting to FBI headquarters in Washington, D.C. Since Aquash was not officially identified at the time, her body was buried in South Dakota as a "Jane Doe".

On March 10, 1976, eight days after the burial, Aquash's remains were exhumed due to requests made by the American Indian Movement and her family. AIM arranged for a second autopsy to be conducted by Dr. Gary Peterson, a pathologist from Minneapolis. He found that she had been shot by a .32 caliber bullet on the left side at the back of her head, under the hairline, in a shot that traveled upwards, missing the brain and lodging in her left eye socket. It was described as execution-style murder.

She was reinterred in Oglala Lakota land. Rumors persisted that she had been killed by AIM as an informant; the federal prosecution of activist Leonard Peltier was underway for the 1975 shooting deaths of two FBI agents at Pine Ridge. Peter Matthiessen's history, In the Spirit of Crazy Horse, details the planting of disinformation about Aquash by a CIA informant years before her murder.

Aquash's murder was initially investigated by the Bureau of Indian Affairs, because they had jurisdiction over homicides that occurred on the reservation, as it was thought hers had. It was learned that Aquash had been seen at the Pine Ridge Reservation before her disappearance in December 1975.

Federal grand juries were called to hear testimony in her case in 1976, 1982 and 1994, but no indictments were made. In 1997 Paul DeMain, editor of the independent newspaper News From Indian Country, started regularly publishing articles about the investigation of the murder of Aquash.

== People come forward ==
On November 3, 1999, Robert Pictou-Branscombe, a maternal cousin of Aquash from Canada, and Russell Means, associated with the Denver-based AIM movement, held a press conference in Denver at the Federal Building to discuss the slow progress of the investigation into Aquash's murder. It had been under investigation both by the FBI and the BIA.

Earlier that day in a telephone interview with journalists Paul DeMain and Harlan McKosato, journalist Minnie Two Shoes commented about the importance of Aquash,

Part of why she was so important is because she was very symbolic. She was a hard working woman. She dedicated her life to the movement, to righting all the injustices that she could, and to pick somebody out and launch their little cointelpro program on her, to bad jacket her to the point where she ends up dead – whoever did it – let's look at what the reasons are. You know, she was killed and lets look at the real reasons why it could have been any of us. It could have been me. It could have been... Ya gotta look at the basically thousands of women. You gotta remember that it was mostly women in AIM. It could have been any one of us and I think that's why it's been so important. And she was just such a good person.

Paul DeMain (Ojibwe/Oneida), publisher and editor of News from Indian Country, said that day,

...Anna Mae had a legacy of doing things differently, in 1975 she was alcohol- and drug-free, which made her stand out within the movement boldly because many people were still using and partying and there were many things going on in that area.

In a January 2002 editorial in the News from Indian Country, DeMain said that he had met with several people who reported hearing Leonard Peltier in 1975 admit the shootings of the two FBI agents on June 26, 1975, at the Pine Ridge Reservation. They also said that they believed the motive for the death of Aquash, "allegedly was her knowledge of who shot the two [FBI] agents, and Joe Stuntz." DeMain did not reveal his sources because of their personal danger in having spoken to him. In an editorial of March 2003, DeMain withdrew his support for clemency in the life sentence of Peltier. In response, Peltier sued DeMain for libel on May 1, 2003. On May 25, 2004, after Arlo Looking Cloud was convicted by the jury, Peltier withdrew the suit; he and DeMain reached a settlement.

== Indictments and a co-conspirator ==
In January 2003, a fourth federal grand jury was called in Rapid City to hear testimony about the murder of Aquash. She was known to have been given a ride from the home of Troy Lynn Yellow Wood of Denver on December 10, 1975, by AIM members Arlo Looking Cloud, John Graham and Theda Nelson Clarke, who transported her to Rapid City, South Dakota. Rumors that they took Aquash further to the Pine Ridge Reservation in mid-December have never been confirmed; however, Aquash "failed to make her traditional Christmas phone calls to her daughters, sisters and close friend in Nova Scotia. So accustomed were they to hearing from her that they began to fear something was seriously wrong."

On March 20, 2003, a federal grand jury indicted Looking Cloud (an Oglala Lakota) and Graham (aka John Boy Patton), a Southern Tutchone (speakers of an Athabascan language) from Whitehorse, Yukon, Canada for her murder. Although Clarke, Graham's adopted aunt, was alleged to have been involved, she was not indicted; by then, she was in failing health and being cared for in a nursing home.

Bruce Ellison, who has been Leonard Peltier's lawyer since the 1970s, invoked his Fifth Amendment rights against self-incrimination and refused to testify at the grand jury hearings on charges against Looking Cloud or at his trial in 2004. During the trial, the federal prosecutor referred to Ellison as a co-conspirator in the Aquash case.

=== Looking Cloud convicted ===
On February 8, 2004, the trial of Arlo Looking Cloud began before a U.S. federal jury; five days later, they found him guilty of murder. On April 23, 2004, he was given a mandatory sentence of life in prison. Although no physical evidence linking Looking Cloud to the crime was presented, a videotape was shown in which he admitted to having been at the scene of the murder, but said he was not aware that Aquash was going to be killed. In that video, Looking Cloud was interviewed by Detective Abe Alonzo of the Denver Police Department and Robert Ecoffey, the Director of the Bureau of Indian Affairs Office of Law Enforcement Services. On March 27, 2003, Looking Cloud said that John Graham was the gunman.

Looking Cloud said that he was making his statement while high and under the influence of "a little bit of alcohol." Trial testimony showed that Looking Cloud told a number of other individuals in various times and places about having been present at the murder of Aquash.

Looking Cloud appealed his conviction. In the appeal, filed by attorney Terry Gilbert, who replaced his trial attorney Tim Rensch, Looking Cloud retracted his videotaped confession, saying that it was false. He appealed based on the grounds that his trial counsel Rensch was ineffective in failing to object to the introduction of the videotaped statement, that he failed to object to hearsay statements of Anna Mae Aquash, failed to object to hearsay instruction for the jury, and failed to object to leading questions by the prosecution to Robert Ecoffey. The United States Court of Appeals for the Eighth Circuit denied Looking Cloud's appeal. On August 19, 2005, the U.S. Court of Appeals for the Eighth Circuit affirmed the judgment of conviction. Richard Two Elk, adopted brother of Looking Cloud; Troy Lynn Yellow Wood, former AIM chairman John Trudell, and Aquash's daughters Denise and Debbie Maloney were other witnesses who testified at the trial that Looking Cloud had separately confessed his involvement to them before any indictments or arrests.

=== Extradition of Graham ===
On June 22, 2006, Canada's Minister of Justice, Vic Toews, ordered the extradition of John Graham to the United States to face charges on his alleged involvement in the murder of Aquash. Graham appealed the order and was held under house arrest with conditions. In July 2007, a Canadian court denied his appeal, and upheld the extradition order. On December 6, 2007, the Supreme Court of Canada denied Graham's second appeal of his extradition.

In an interview, recorded in the studios of Pacifica Radio KPFK, Los Angeles on March 30, 2004, when being asked by Antoinette Nora Claypoole about the last time he saw Annie Mae Aquash, Graham replied: "Last time when we drove from Denver to Pine Ridge, and you know that ride there going to Pine Ridge, and talking with her, gearing up. And then gettin to a safe house."

=== Richard Marshall ===
In August 2008, a federal grand jury indicted Vine Richard "Dick" Marshall with aiding and abetting the murder. Marshall was a bodyguard for Russell Means at the time of Aquash's murder. It was alleged that Graham, Looking Cloud, and Theda Nelson Clarke had taken Aquash to Marshall's house, where they held her, then took her to be executed in a far corner of the reservation. Marshall's wife, Cleo Gates, testified to this at Looking Cloud's trial. Marshall is alleged to have provided the murder weapon to Graham and Looking Cloud. Marshall was imprisoned in 1976 after being convicted in the 1975 shooting death of a man. He was paroled from prison in 2000. He was acquitted of the charge of conspiracy to murder Aquash.

== State trial for Graham and Rios ==
In September 2009, Graham and Thelma Rios, a Lakota advocate in Rapid City, were charged by the State Court of South Dakota with the kidnapping, rape and murder of Aquash. The case against the defendants continued through much of 2010.

=== Thelma Rios ===
Thelma Conroy-Rios, a longtime Lakota advocate in Rapid City, South Dakota was charged by the state of South Dakota in September 2009, along with John Graham, for the kidnapping, rape and murder of Aquash. Already in poor health, she avoided a trial on murder charges by agreeing to a plea bargain "that acknowledged her role in the events leading up to Aquash's death." In November 2010, she pleaded guilty to the charge of being an accessory to kidnapping and received a five-year sentence, most of which was suspended due to her poor health.

Rios admitted in court that she "relayed a message from AIM leadership to other AIM members to bring Aquash from Denver to Rapid City in December 1975, because they thought she was a government informant." Rios died of lung cancer February 9, 2011. Although names were redacted in her plea agreement at court, she had said she heard two people ordering Aquash to be brought from Denver to Rapid City and that there was a discussion about "offing her".

=== Graham convicted of felony murder ===
On December 10, 2010, after two days of deliberation in the state court, jurors found John Graham guilty of felony murder, but acquitted him of the charge for premeditated murder. The felony murder conviction carries a mandatory sentence of life in prison. After an appeal by Graham, the South Dakota Supreme Court upheld the lower court conviction in May 2012.

== Theories ==
Observers and historians speculate about who ordered the murder of Annie Mae Aquash. Before her death, Aquash allegedly said FBI Special Agent David Price threatened that she would die within the year if she refused to inform on Leonard Peltier.

John Trudell testified in both the 1976 Butler and Robideau trial and the 2004 Looking Cloud trial that Dennis Banks had told him that the body of Annie Mae Aquash had been found before it was officially identified. Banks wrote in his autobiography, Ojibwa Warrior, that Trudell told him that the body found was that of Aquash. Banks wrote that he did not know until then that Aquash had been killed, although she had been missing.

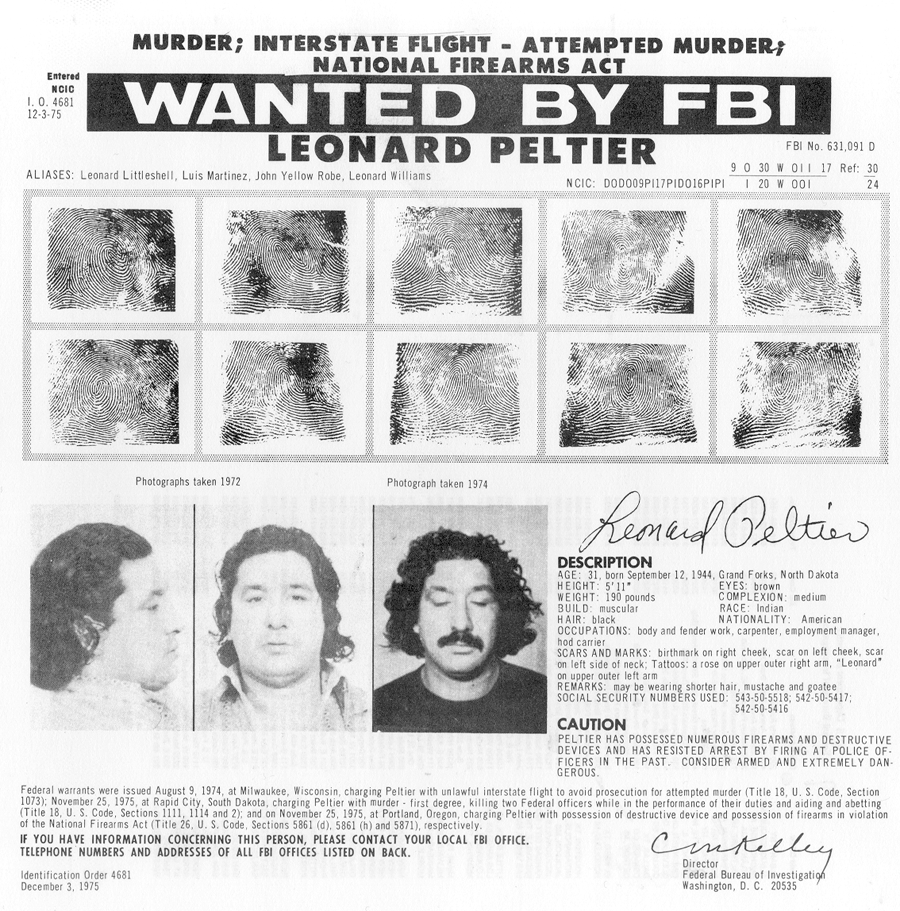
FBI wanted poster for Leonard Peltier

In Looking Cloud's trial, the prosecution argued that AIM's suspicion of Aquash stemmed from her having heard Peltier admit to the murders of the FBI agents. Darlene "Kamook" Nichols, former wife of the AIM leader Dennis Banks, testified that in late 1975, Peltier told of shooting the FBI agents. He was talking to a small group of AIM activists who were fugitives from law enforcement. They included Nichols, her sister Bernie Nichols (later Lafferty), Nichols' husband Dennis Banks, and Aquash, among several others. Nichols testified that Peltier said, "[t]he motherfucker was begging for his life, but I shot him anyway." Bernie Nichols-Lafferty gave the same account of Peltier's statement.

Other witnesses have testified that once Aquash came under suspicion as an informant, Peltier interrogated her while holding a gun to her head. Peltier and David Hill later had Aquash participate in bomb-making so that her fingerprints would be on the bombs. The trio planted the bombs at two power plants on the Pine Ridge reservation. Extensive testimony suggests that AIM leaders ordered the murder of Aquash; because of her prominent position in the organization, lower-ranking members would not have taken action against her without permission from above.

== Denise and Debbie Maloney ==
Together with federal and state investigators, Aquash's daughters Denise and Debbie believe that high-ranking AIM leaders ordered the death of their mother due to fears of her being an informant; they support the continued investigation. Denise Pictou-Maloney is the executive director of the "Indigenous Women for Justice", a group she founded to support justice for her mother and other Native women. In a 2004 interview, Pictou-Maloney said her mother was killed by AIM members who thought she knew too much. "She knew what was happening in California, she knew where the money was coming from to pay for the guns, she knew the plans, but more than any of that, she knew about the killings of the two FBI agents." In March 2018, Denise Maloney spoke at the Missing and Murdered Indigenous Women inquiry in Montreal about her mother's murder.

== Re-interment at Indian Brook Reserve ==
After the conviction of Looking Cloud in 2004, Aquash's family had her remains exhumed. They were transported to her homeland of Nova Scotia for reinterment on June 21 at Indian Brook Reserve in Shubenacadie. They held appropriate Mi'kmaq ceremonies and celebrated the work and life of the activist. Family and supporters have held annual anniversary ceremonies in Aquash's honor since then.

== Representations in culture and media ==
=== Film ===
- The Spirit of Anna Mae (2002) – a 72-minute film directed by Catherine Anne Martin, a tribute by women who knew Aquash. Produced by the National Film Board of Canada (NFB).
- Maggie Eagle Bear – a leading character in the film drama Thunderheart (1992), who is loosely based on Aquash.

=== Television ===
- Vow of Silence: The Assassination of Annie Mae (2024) – a 4-episode television series directed and produced by Yvonne Russo.
- Annie Mae: A Brave Hearted Woman, 1980

=== Literature ===
- Lakota Woman - Mary Brave Bird's 1990 memoir (published under the name Mary Crow Dog). Having been a close friend of Aquash, Brave Bird dedicates the chapter "Two Cut-off Hands" to her friendship with Aquash and the events leading to her death.
- Aquash is the subject of June Jordan's "Poem for Nana," from Passion, her 1980 collection of poems.
- Aquash is presumably the inspiration for Gina Bad Horse in Jason Aaron’s “Scalped” Crime/Western graphic novel series; this is the activist mother of undercover FBI agent Dashiell “Dash” Bad Horse.

=== Music ===
- "Slaying the Sun Woman", "Bury My Heart at Wounded Knee" on the Coincidence and Likely Stories album, and "The Uranium War" on Power in the Blood, by American singer-songwriter, musician and activist, Buffy Sainte-Marie.
- "Anna Mae" – song by British Socialist folk singer Roy Bailey, set to the tune of "The Wind and Rain"
- "Today's Empires, Tomorrow's Ashes" – wherein punk band Propagandhi sing, "No justice shines upon the cemetery plots marked Hampton, Weaver or Anna-Mae".
- "Anna Mae" – song by American folk singer-songwriter and social activist Jim Page
- "Anna Mae" – song by Larry Long
- "Stolen Land" – song by Canadian singer Bruce Cockburn, wherein he mentions "The spirit of Almighty Voice, the ghost of Anna Mae Call like thunder from the mountain, you can hear them say "it's a stolen land"
- "Anna Mae Aquash" – song by Canadian folk/jazz singer-songwriter and Canadian social activist Faith Nolan
- "For Anna Mae Pictou Aquash" – poem by Joy Harjo, recorded as a song by Harjo and the band Poetic Justice
- "¿Do the Digs Dug?" – song by alternative political hip hop trio The Goats containing the line "Whatcha afraid of? Annie Mae Aquash? Found her lying in the ditch with no place for a watch."

=== Theatre ===
- Annie Mae's Movement (1999, reprinted 2006), a play by Yvette Nolan about Aquash and her participation in AIM

== See also ==
- Fred Hampton
- List of solved missing person cases: 1950–1999
- Missing and murdered Indigenous women
- Native American women in politics

== Bibliography ==
- Johanna Brand, The Life and Death of Anna Mae Aquash, Lorimer; 2nd edition (January 1, 1993). ISBN 1-55028-422-3.
- Steve Hendricks, The Unquiet Grave: The FBI and the Struggle for the Soul of Indian Country. New York: Thunder's Mouth Press, 2006. ISBN 1-56025-735-0
