= Darlene Ka-Mook Nichols =

Native American activist and FBI informant

Darlene Nichols
- Ka-Mook
- Born: Darlene Pearl Nichols; 1955 (age 70–71); Scotts Bluff, Nebraska, US
- Occupations: Civil rights activist FBI Informant; Outpatient Therapist
- Years active: 1972–1978
- Organization(s): American Indian Movement (formerly); FBI (formerly)
- Known for: The Longest Walk; Wounded Knee incident
- Spouse: Dennis Banks (1972–1989)
- Children: Tokala Banks; Tiopa Banks; Tasina Banks; Tacanunpa Banks
- Relatives: Bernie Nichols-Lafferty (sister); Barbara Robideau (sister)

Darlene Nichols, also known by the names Kamook, Ka-Mook, Kamook Nichols and Ka-Mook Nichols, is a Native American activist and former member of the American Indian Movement (AIM). She is best known for her role in organizing The Longest Walk, and for serving as a key witness in the trials of AIM members Arlo Looking Cloud, Richard Marshall, and John Graham who were ultimately convicted in the murder of Anna Mae Aquash.

== Early life ==
Darlene "Ka-Mook" Ecoffey was born Darlene Pearl Nichols in the city of Scotts Bluff, Nebraska. She is from the Pine Ridge Indian Reservation. Sources vary on the exact age Nichols was when she first met Dennis Banks. Some sources say she met Banks at 17, some sources state 16, and others state that he met her when she was 14. Dennis Banks, co-founder of the American Indian Movement and one of its leaders, 34 at the time, started having a sexual affair with Nichols when she was 15-years-old, and had their first child together when she was 17.

== Personal life ==
Nichols had previously lived with AIM leader Dennis Banks for 17 years and is mother of four of Banks' thirteen children. She would separate from Banks in 1989. Shortly after the conviction of Arlo Looking Cloud on 8 February 2004 for the first-degree murder of Anna Mae Aquash, Nichols would marry Robert Ecoffey, an Oglala man who served as the lead investigator into Aquash's murder and now Bureau of Indian Affairs superintendent for the Pine Ridge Indian Reservation in September 2004.

Aquash's affair with Banks began while he was still in a common-law marriage with Nichols. Aquash's relationship with Banks was viewed with contempt and consternation by women of different tribal affiliations within the movement, as they believed the relationship represented a threat to AIM's stability at a time when AIM had become "a vortex of paranoia."

In 1973, when Nichols met Aquash, they wound up becoming friends.

In 1975, Nichols's second daughter, Ta Tiyopa Maza Win (or Iron Door Woman), was born while Nichols was taken to a jail in Wichita, Kansas on a firearms charge.

== Activism ==
Nichols had previously participated in a Gordon, Nebraska rally related to Native American causes. One of the greatest hallmarks of Nichols' career as a civil rights activist and organizer was "The Longest Walk." In response to 11 bills introduced in the United States Congress intended to dismantle American Indian tribal sovereignty, tribal lands and water rights in 1978. The Longest Walk was thought of with the Trail of Broken Treaties of 1972 in mind, a similar form of protest which consisted of a caravan by car and subsequent march in Washington, D.C. and occupation of the Bureau of Indian Affairs to protest the government's during the throes of the Termination Era. The Longest Walk also symbolized the last major event of the Red Power Movement. Organized by Nichols and then husband, Dennis Banks, the former organized over 30,000 Native Americans from 80 different Tribal nations in the city of Davis, California and marched 5,800 kilometers (3,600 miles) from Alcatraz to Washington, D.C. in a span of 5 months. The Longest Walk came to an end on 15 July 1978 when approximately 2,000 people entered the United States nation's capital, traveled to Meridian Hill Park and stopped at the Washington Monument. The Longest Walk was a resounding success, as the demonstration brought international attention and outrage against the federal paternalism the nation's Native Americans were facing, and resulted in the bills being defeated.

== FBI informant ==
Nichols originally served as a staunch supporter of the American Indian Movement. Even while one of her daughters was born in federal prison, Nichols refused to cooperate with the FBI. However, following the murder of activist and friend Anna Mae Aquash, she began to reconsider her steadfast alliance with the group. After reading newspaper reports about the murder of Anna Mae Pictou-Aquash, Nichols began to suspect that the American Indian Movement was involved with Anna Mae's murder. Nichols contacted the FBI, agreed to cooperate in Aquash's murder investigation and later wore a wire to record conversations with Arlo Looking Cloud, Dennis Banks and others.

One particular conversation with ex-husband Dennis Banks proved to be particularly illuminating. Dennis Banks had been the subject of investigation regarding the death of African-American civil rights protestor Ray Robinson, who disappeared when he traveled to Wounded Knee to participate in the Wounded Knee incident and fellow AIM activist Anna Mae-Pictou Aquash. Although Banks would claim to not have any knowledge of Robinson until after the conclusion of the Wounded Knee siege, recordings of Banks' conversation appear to suggest otherwise. In 2001, Nichols interviewed Banks while trying to learn more about the 1975 murder of AIM activist Anna Mae Aquash. Although Banks refused to discuss Aquash, he directed the conversation to Robinson, saying that he had been shot by another AIM officer and bled to death because the group was under siege and had no way to treat him adequately. Banks said he saw Robinson's body and ordered a subordinate, Chris Westerman, to "bury him where no one will know." He said Westerman was "gone for about five hours" and that Robinson had been buried "over by the creek." (Westerman is the brother of activist, actor and musician Floyd Red Crow Westerman.)

== Testimony ==
=== Testimony About Leonard Peltier ===
Nichols testified in three trials concerning the murder of Anna Mae Aquash. Arlo Looking Cloud and John Graham were convicted of first degree murder while Richard Marshall was acquitted. Some of her testimony involved Leonard Peltier, who received a life sentence for the 1975 murder of two FBI agents

In the Graham trial, Nichols described an exchange between Pictou-Aquash and another AIM member, Leonard Peltier, in which Pictou-Aquash told Peltier to either shoot her or defend her. Nichols testified that Leonard Peltier said "he believed [Aquash] was a Fed and that he was going to get some truth serum and give it to her so she would tell the truth." Nichols testified that she had heard how Peltier "put a gun to her [Aquash's] head and wanted to know if she was an informant." Nichols said she and Aquash shared a jail cell in the fall of 1975, and during their brief internment together, Aquash openly discussed her fears. According to Nichols, "She was upset, she was crying, she was afraid. I knew she was scared of Leonard and Dennis at that point." Nichols also told jurors that she was with Aquash when Peltier bragged about killing two FBI agents in 1975. It was also the last time she saw Aquash alive.

=== United States v. Looking Cloud ===
Fritz Arlo Looking Cloud, an Oglala Sioux and adopted brother of former American Indian Movement member Richard Two Elk, was arrested 27 March 2003 in Denver, Colorado on a warrant issued by federal authorities in South Dakota, in which Looking Cloud and another man were accused of shooting Pictou-Aquash during a kidnapping in December 1975 near Wanblee, South Dakota.

Nichols-Ecoffey testified that Peltier told her and Aquash that he killed two FBI agents during a June 1975 shootout (known as the Jumping Bull Compound Shootout) at a Pine Ridge ranch. According to Nichols-Ecoffey's testimony, "He said the (expletive) was begging for his life, but I shot him anyway." According to Nichols-Ecoffey, she, along with Leonard Peltier, her sisters, Bernie Nichols-Lafferty and Barbara Robideau, then-husband Dennis Banks, and others, were riding in a recreational vehicle lent to the American Indian Movement by the Hollywood actor Marlon Brando when Peltier recounted this event. Nichols-Ecoffey also testified that she had heard Peltier say he thought Aquash was a snitch.

During the trial, Nichols-Ecoffey testified about several incidents of violence involving the American Indian Movement. Three of these incidents were The Custer Courthouse Riot Incident which involved several hundred people, the seventy-one day occupation of Wounded Knee, and a shoot-out near her home, during which two FBI agents were killed. Nichols-Ecoffey also discussed rumors that Aquash was an informant, which were known to or held as suspicions by nearly twenty members of the American Indian Movement. Nichols-Ecoffey also testified that several members, one of whom had already threatened Aquash's life because he suspected she was an informant, took Aquash away for weeks to "watch her," explaining that Aquash was constantly under the surveillance of American Indian Movement members, was not allowed to go anywhere alone, and was not permitted to go home despite her requests to do so. Mathalene White Bear, another former member of the American Indian Movement who provided shelter to Aquash in 1975, testified that Aquash believed her life was in danger as early as September of that year. Nichols-Ecoffey testified that Leonard Crow Dog and Leonard Peltier thought Aquash was an informant, and that Nichols-Ecoffey, her daughter, and Dennis Banks heard Peltier say that he thought Aquash was an informant.

In February 2004, a federal jury composed of seven women and five men deliberated for approximately seven hours before convicting Arlo Looking Cloud in the 1975 execution-style slaying of Anna Mae Pictou Aquash. Looking Cloud appealed to the United States Eighth Circuit Court of Appeals in 2005, but his appeal was struck down and his mandatory life prison term was affirmed. In August 2011, however, U.S. District Judge Lawrence Piersol signed an order that reduced Looking Cloud's lifetime federal prison sentence to 20 years, in exchange for Looking Cloud's December, 2010 testimony for state prosecutors against co-conspirator John Graham.

=== State of South Dakota v. Graham ===
John Graham, of Southern Tutchone ethnicity, a native of the Yukon and father of eight, was living in Vancouver when he was charged in the United States on 30 March 2003, with the 1975 first-degree murder/pre-meditated murder of Anna Mae Aquash.

On 6 December 2007, Graham was extradited from Canada to the United States based on the pre-mediated murder charge. After protracted litigation in the federal courts, the federal pre-meditated murder charge was dismissed in United States v. Graham, 572 F.3d 954 (8th Cir.2009). Before Graham could return to Canada, however, he was indicted by a Pennington County grand jury on state charges of premeditated murder and felony murder. The underlying felony was alleged to be the kidnapping of Anna Mae Pictou Aquash.

On 2 December 2010, South Dakota Judge John Delaney forbade any mention to jurors of a finding in the first autopsy report for Aquash suggesting that she may have had sex shortly before her death, a finding that prosecutors believed originated from Graham allegedly raping Aquash during her kidnapping.

On 3 December 2010, Nichols-Ecoffey, who had previously been married to AIM leader Dennis Banks, testified that an AIM activist (later convicted of killing two FBI agents), made an "incriminating" statement in front her and Aquash. Aquash was later shot and killed. The "incriminating" statement referred to Peltier's admission of "shooting the motherf***** that was begging for his life, and still shooting him." Nichols-Ecoffey was forbidden by Circuit Court Judge John Delaney from telling jurors exactly what she alleged group member Leonard Peltier told her six months before Pictou-Aquash was killed. The judge deemed it hearsay, but under questioning from prosecutors, she was allowed to say that Peltier made an "incriminating" statement.

Graham was convicted of felony murder on 10 December 2014, after jurors heard evidence that he aided in abducting Aquash from Denver in December, 1975.

== Legacy ==
Nichols-Ecoffey has been both praised and condemned for cooperating with the federal government and testifying against John Graham, Richard Marshall, and Arlo Looking Cloud. Her testimony implicated Leonard Peltier in the separate murder of two FBI agents. She has also been castigated by some American Indians for cooperating with the FBI. Barry Bachrach, one of Leonard Peltier's defense lawyers, claimed Nichols had received money from the FBI in exchange for her testimony. According to Bachrach, "This case was nothing more than smearsay. They coached Kamook and she admitted she had been paid $40,000 by the FBI. Her evidence should never have seen the light of day." Robert Robideau, co-defendant and first cousin to Leonard Peltier, also claimed that Nichols accepted $47,000.00 to say Peltier bragged about killing two agents. There are some who believe Nichols-Ecoffey had financial motivation to lie about the actions undertaken by AIM members.

During United States v. Looking Cloud, Nichols acknowledged receipt of $42,000 from the FBI in connection with her cooperation on the case, money she explained was compensation for the expenses she incurred while traveling to collect evidence by wearing a wire while visiting her ex-husband, Dennis Banks. The money was also paid to her to cover relocation expenses due to her fear of Banks. The government also paid to move Nichols from California to a safer location in New Mexico because of her involvement with the case. She said she moved again after Banks learned where she was living. According to FBI agent caseworker for the Aquash case, the $42,000 reimbursed was accounted for by receipt according to Jim Graff, FBI agent caseworker for the Aquash case. Nichols, who worked in the movie industry, had to pass up several contracts for movie casting over a three-year timeframe that cost over $100,000 in personal income, including one three month casting offer that alone would have paid her around $50,000.

The Indigenous Women for Justice, where Denise Maloney-Pictou, one of Aquash's daughters, serves as executive director, thanked Nichols-Ecoffey for the heroism she displayed in the testimony that led to convictions in her mother's (Aquash) murder. Joseph H. Trimbach, one of the special agents who was part of the Wounded Knee incident and Anna Mae Aquash murder investigation, and his son, John H. Trimbach (who is also a special agent), chronicled the testimony provided by witnesses, including Nichols-Ecoffey, in the book, which served as a recount of the events which surrounded the Pine Ridge Indian Reservation and the American Indian Movement during the 1970s from the perspective of a former FBI Chief Agent.

On 27 August 2008, Nichols-Ecoffey and her husband opened a Subway restaurant on the Pine Ridge Indian Reservation.

== See also ==
- American Indian Movement
- Wounded Knee incident
- Ray Robinson
- Anna Mae Pictou-Aquash
- Leonard Peltier
