= Dennis Banks =

American indigenous activist (1937–2017)

- Naawakamig
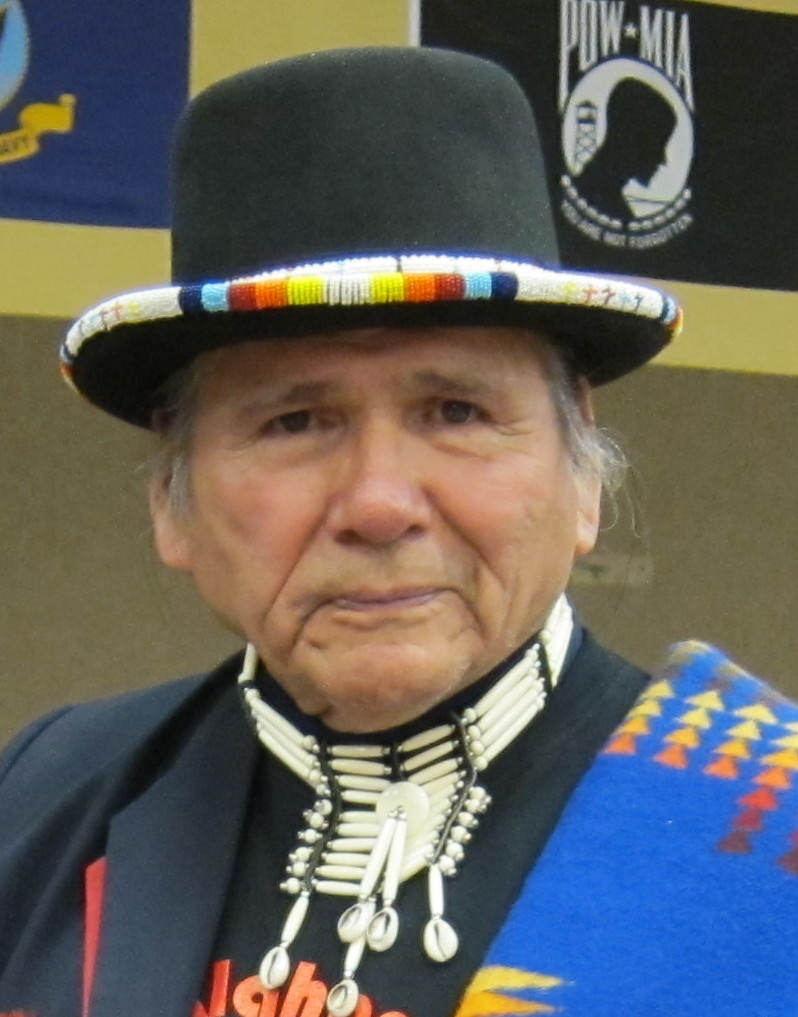
- Banks in 2013
- Born: April 12, 1937; Leech Lake Indian Reservation, Minnesota, U.S.
- Died: October 29, 2017 (aged 80); Rochester, Minnesota, U.S.
- Occupations: Teacher, lecturer, activist, author
- Children: 20

Dennis J. Banks (April 12, 1937 – October 29, 2017) was a Native American activist, teacher, and author. He was a longtime leader of the American Indian Movement, which he co-founded in Minneapolis, Minnesota in 1968 to represent urban Indians. He was a pre-eminent spokesman for Native Americans. His protests won government concessions and created national attention and sympathy for the oppression and endemic social and economic conditions for Native Americans.

== Early life ==
Born on Leech Lake Indian Reservation in northern Minnesota in 1937, Dennis Banks was also known as Nowa Cumig (Naawakamig in the Ojibwe Double Vowel System).

At the age of 5, Banks was taken from his reservation and family to be forcibly moved to a federal Indian boarding school, run by the Bureau of Indian Affairs (now the Bureau of Indian Education). Its goals were to "civilize" and educate Native American children in English and mainstream culture, in effect, to assimilate them. Children were prohibited to speak their native languages or practice their traditions. Vocational training was emphasized. Banks ran away often, returning to live with family at Leech Lake. He attended Pipestone Indian Boarding School in Minnesota, which closed in 1953. It had been founded in 1892 according to the federal model established at the Carlisle Indian Industrial School.

When he was 17, Banks joined the US Air Force and was stationed in Japan. He was fascinated to be in a place where Europeans were the minority. During this period, in 1956 he was ordered to shoot to kill anti-base protesters during the Sunagawa Struggle. The events had a profound influence on him. After he went AWOL, he was dishonorably discharged from the military. He returned to Minnesota, where he participated in a burglary, for which he was convicted, serving two and a half years in prison.

== Activism ==
=== Work with AIM ===
Banks was a champion of Native pride, who defied authority and spoke for the Nation's oldest minority. In 1968, Banks co-founded the American Indian Movement (AIM) in Minneapolis. AIM sought to ensure and to protect the civil rights of Native Americans living in urban areas and to protest the treatment of Native Americans and the nation's history of injustices against its indigenous peoples. Banks felt that a point had been reached in history, where Native Americans could not tolerate any longer the abuse and Native American mothers could not tolerate any longer the mistreatment that goes on on reservations.

Banks participated in the 1969–1971 Occupation of Alcatraz, initiated by Indian students from San Francisco of the Red Power movement. It was intended to highlight Native American issues and promote Indian sovereignty on their own lands. Banks and Oglala Lakota Russell Means were by the mid-1970s the best known Native Americans since Lakota war leaders Sitting Bull and Crazy Horse, who led the attack that defeated the forces of General Custer at The Battle of Little Big Horn, also known as The Battle of the Greasy Grass.

Banks also traveled to Germany, where he, together with AIM co-founder Vernon Bellecourt, set up an AIM office in West Berlin and also traveled behind the Iron Curtain to meet with East German AIM supporters.

==== Trail of Broken Treaties ====
In 1972, he assisted in the organization of AIM's "Trail of Broken Treaties", a caravan of numerous activist groups across the United States to Washington, D.C., to call attention to the plight of Native Americans. The caravan members anticipated meeting with United States Congress leaders about related issues, but government officials, most notably Harrison Loesch, the Interior Department Assistant Secretary responsible for the Bureau of Indian Affairs (BIA), refused to meet with delegates. Banks helped lead a takeover of the BIA offices. Activists seized and occupied the headquarters of the Department of Interior.; in the process some vandalized the offices of the BIA. Many valuable Indian land deeds were destroyed or lost during the occupation. Over 9000 tons of documents were removed by AIM members and hidden by the Hatteras Tuscarora and Lumbee in Robeson County, N.C. The FBI would find the documents and many were returned to the BIA.

Some thirty years later, Banks returned to Robeson County, North Carolina. where he reconnected with Hatteras Tuscarora/Lumbee Attorney and Activist JoJo Brooks Shifflett. Banks and Shifflett remained in a committed relationship during the last years of his life.

==== Wounded Knee incident ====
Wounded Knee was the scene of the last major conflict of the so-called American Indian Wars, in which 350 Lakota men, women, and children were massacred by United States Army in 1890. It was the deadliest mass-shooting in US history. In 1973, Banks returned to Wounded Knee on the Pine Ridge Indian Reservation in South Dakota, when the local Lakota civil rights organization asked for help in dealing with law enforcement authorities in nearby border towns. Residents of Pine Ridge believed the police had failed to prosecute the murder of a young Lakota man. Under Banks' leadership, AIM led a protest in Custer, South Dakota in 1973 against judicial proceedings that had resulted in the reduction of charges of a white man to a second degree offense for murdering a Native American.

AIM became involved in the political faction wanting to oust Richard Wilson, the elected chairman of the Oglala Sioux Tribe. Opponents believed that he was acting autocratically, including recruiting a private police force. A failure of an impeachment proceeding against him led to a large protest. Banks and other AIM activists occupied Wounded Knee. After a siege of 71 days by federal armed law enforcement, which received national attention, the occupation was ended. A U.S. marshal was shot and paralyzed in March. A Cherokee and an Oglala Lakota were fatally shot in April 1973 by federal agents. Civil rights activist Ray Robinson, who had joined the protesters, disappeared during the occupation and is believed to have been murdered.

Thirty resident families returned to the village to find that their homes and businesses had been destroyed by the federal agents. The town was never rebuilt. Banks was the principal negotiator and leader of the Wounded Knee occupation. Subsequent investigation of Wilson found questionable accounting practices, and Wilson had sold off tens of thousands of acres of the reservation to mining companies. As a result of involvement in Custer and Wounded Knee, Banks and 300 others were arrested by the federal government and faced trial. He was acquitted of the Wounded Knee charges, but was convicted of incitement to riot and assault stemming from the earlier confrontation at Custer.

=== Aquash murder and trial ===
Refusing the prison term, Banks jumped bail and worked with Anna Mae Pictou Aquash in the American Indian Movement. After the Wounded Knee Occupation—where COINTELPRO FBI agents sieged the occupation, cut off electricity, water and food supplies to Wounded Knee, when it was still winter in South Dakota, and prohibited the entry of the media; and the US government tried starving out the occupants, AIM activists smuggled food and medical supplies in past roadblocks "set up by Dick Wilson and tacitly supported by the US government"— there were many suspicious events surrounding murders of AIM activists and their subsequent investigations or lack thereof. Deaths of AIM activists went uninvestigated, even though there was an abundance of FBI agents on Pine Ridge Indian Reservation at the time. For instance, Annie Mae Aquash was an activist who had been present at Wounded Knee and was framed by the FBI as a spy for the government. It was later revealed that most of this campaign to discredit her can be traced to Douglass Durham, an FBI informant.

Aquash was found dead near Highway 73 on February 24, 1976. The FBI ruled her cause of death was exposure, suggesting alcohol had been involved, even though there was none in her bloodstream. Dissatisfied with this finding, an exhumation was requested by OSCRO, which found that Aquash had been shot in the back of her head at close range, after being beaten severely in the face with many of her teeth missing from the beating. After disappearing from Denver in late 1975, Aquash was found murdered in February 1976 by a rancher near the Pine Ridge Reservation. She had been shot in the back of the head execution style, and her murder was unsolved for decades.

Banks was given amnesty in California by then-Governor Jerry Brown, who refused to extradite him to South Dakota to face the charges related to activities in the 1973 Custer protests. He also received financial support from actor and AIM sympathizer Marlon Brando. In January 2003, a federal grand jury indicted Arlo Looking Cloud and John Graham in the murder of Aquash. Since 2004, they have been convicted by federal and state juries; each is serving a life sentence. In 2008, Vine Richard "Dick" Marshall was indicted by a federal grand jury for aiding and abetting the murder of Aquash; he was alleged to have provided John Graham with a gun. He was acquitted of the charge. In 1975, he had been serving as one of Banks' bodyguards. Aquash was brought to Marshall's house on the Pine Ridge Reservation in December 1975 before being taken to the site of her murder. Authorities continue to investigate the Aquash murder. In 2014, The New York Times Magazine spoke to Banks for an in-depth feature about the murders of Aquash and Ray Robinson.

== Education and career ==
During his time in California from 1976 to 1983, Banks earned an associate's degree from the University of California, Davis. He taught at the recently opened Native American Studies department at Contra Costa College and at Deganawidah Quetzalcoatl University (DQU), a Native American-controlled institute of alternative higher learning, where he became the first American Indian chancellor. In 1978, he established the first spiritual run from Davis to Los Angeles, which is now an annual event. In the spring of 1979, he taught at Stanford University.

After Governor Brown left office, in 1984 Banks received sanctuary from the Onondaga Nation in upstate New York. While on their reservation in New York, Banks organized the Great Jim Thorpe Longest Run from New York to Los Angeles; the goal was to gain restoration of the gold medals which Thorpe had won at the 1912 Olympics for the Thorpe family.

In 1985, Banks left Onondaga to surrender to federal law enforcement officials in South Dakota. He served 18 months in prison related to the 1973 charges for the Custer riot. After his release, he worked as a drug and alcohol counselor on the Pine Ridge Indian Reservation. During 1987, grave robbers in Uniontown, Kentucky were halted in their digging for artifacts in American Indian grave sites. Banks organized the reburial ceremonies. His activities resulted in the states of Kentucky and Indiana passing strict legislation against grave desecration.

In 2006, Banks led Sacred Run 2006, a spiritual run from San Francisco's Alcatraz Island to Washington, D.C. The runners followed the ancient Native American tradition of bringing a message of "Land, Life and Peace" from village to village. They traveled around 100 miles every day and entered Washington, D.C., on Earth Day, April 22, 2006. Along the way, they took a southern route in solidarity with those who were rebuilding after hurricanes Katrina and Rita. Major events were held in Albuquerque, New Orleans, Philadelphia, Mississippi, a civil rights site; Knoxville, and Washington, D.C.

Since "The Longest Walk" in 1978, Sacred Runs have developed as an international movement. Sacred Run 2006 had runners from Japan, Australia, Ireland, and Canada, as well as many from the United States. In 2008, the International "The Longest Walk 2" followed the Sacred Run 2006 route, as well as the original route of 1978 walk. Dennis Banks delivered a "Manifesto for Change" to Representative John Conyers (D-MI).

Banks was a member of the board of trustees for Leech Lake Tribal College, a public, two-year college located just outside Cass Lake, Minnesota.

== Politics ==
In August 2016, Banks received the vice presidential nomination of the Peace and Freedom Party, a party with ballot access in California, which identified itself as socialist and feminist. He appeared on the California ballot with presidential nominee Gloria La Riva.

== Marriage and family ==
While deployed in Japan, Banks married a woman named Machiko. After they had been together for two years, Machiko had a daughter, Michiko. Banks left Japan after being court martialed by the Air Force for being AWOL (Absent Without Official Leave). He never saw Machiko or Michiko again. He returned to Japan several times, but Machiko had remarried and Michiko was at university in Northern Japan.

According to birth records from Minnesota, Banks had one child with wife Elladean (Ellie) Banks: Red Elk (born June 7, 1970), and seven children with wife Jeanette Banks: Janice (born March 2, 1962), Darla (born February 18, 1963), fraternal twins Deanna Jane and Dennis James (born April 20, 1964), Tatanka Wanbli (born September 7, 1971).

At Pine Ridge Reservation, Banks met Darlene Kamook Nichols. Sources vary on the exact age Nichols and Banks were when they met. Some sources say Nichols met Banks at 17, some sources state 16, and others state that he met her when she was 14. Some sources say Banks began a sexual affair with Nichols when she was in high school, and as young as 15 years-old, and that they had their first child together when Nichols was 17. Other sources state he was 32 when they met and that they started seeing each other and got married after she graduated. They had three daughters and a son together: Tokala, Tiopa, Tasina and son Tacanunpa Banks. They later divorced. (Kamook Nichols remarried and is now known as Darlene Ecoffey.)

In Salt Lake City he had a daughter, named Arrow, with Angie Begay (Navajo).

In 1989, Banks met a photographer named Alice Lambert. She gave birth to Minoh Biqwad on October 10, 1992.

Banks has several stepchildren: Roland (Kawliga) Blanchard, Beverly Baribeau, Glenda Roberts, Denise Banks, Pearl Blanchard, and Danielle Louise Dickey. (Dickey was murdered in 2007 on the Turtle Mountain Reservation in North Dakota). He has a granddaughter named Migizi from Minneapolis, Minnesota.

Banks had 20 children and more than 100 grandchildren.

== Death ==
Banks died at the age of 80 of complications from pneumonia following heart surgery on October 29, 2017, in Rochester, Minnesota.

== Works ==
=== Filmography ===
- War Party (1988) - Ben Crowkiller / Dead Crow Chief
- The Last of the Mohicans (1992) - Ongewasgone
- Thunderheart (1992) - Himself
- Older Than America (2008) - Pete Goodfeather (final film role)
- American Experience (2009, TV Series documentary - We Shall Remain: "Part V - Wounded Knee") - Himself
- A Good Day to Die (2010, Documentary) - Himself
- Nowa Cumig: The Drum Will Never Stop (2011, Documentary) - Himself
- California Indian (2011) - Himself

=== Discography ===
The musical release Still Strong (1993) features Banks' original songs, as well as traditional Native American songs. He also participated as a musician on such albums as Peter Gabriel's Les Musiques du Monde and Peter Matthiessen's No Boundaries.

In 2012, Banks joined forces with Golden Globe and Grammy Award-winning artist Kitarō in celebration of the Earth on the CD Let Mother Earth Speak. The project contains a message of international peace, intertwined with stories and life lessons from Banks, and featuring the music of Kitaro. The album was released on September 11, 2012, on Domo Records.

=== Autobiography ===
- Banks, Dennis and Richard Erdoes (2004). Ojibwa Warrior: Dennis Banks and the Rise of the American Indian Movement, Norman, Oklahoma: University of Oklahoma Press. ISBN 0-8061-3580-8
