= Russell Means =

Native American activist (1939–2012)

- Waŋblí Ohítika
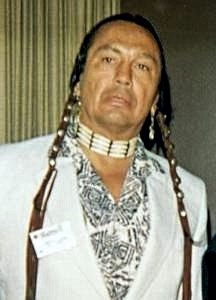
- Means in 1988
- Born: Russell Charles Means; November 10, 1939; Porcupine, Pine Ridge Indian Reservation, U.S.
- Died: October 22, 2012 (aged 72); Rapid City, South Dakota, U.S.
- Resting place: Cremains scattered at the Black Hills
- Occupations: Activist; actor; musician; politician; writer
- Years active: 1968–2012
- Political party: Libertarian (from 1988)
- Other political affiliations: American Indian Movement (1968–1988)
- Spouse: Pearl Means (m. 1999)
- Children: 10, including Tatanka Means (Note: 3 adopted in the Lakota way)

Russell Charles Means (Lakota: Waŋblí Ohítika; November 10, 1939 – October 22, 2012) was an Oglala Lakota activist for the rights of Native Americans, libertarian political activist, actor, musician and writer. He became a prominent member of the American Indian Movement (AIM) after joining the organization in December 1969 and helped organize events that attracted national and international media coverage.

Means was active in international issues of indigenous peoples, including working with groups in Central and South America and with the United Nations for recognition of their rights. He was active in politics at his native Pine Ridge Indian Reservation and at the state and national level.

Beginning an acting career in 1992, he appeared on numerous television series and in several films, including The Last of the Mohicans, Pocahontas, and Curb Your Enthusiasm. He released his own music CD. Means published his autobiography Where White Men Fear to Tread in 1995.

== Early life ==
Means was born on November 10, 1939, in Porcupine, South Dakota, on the Pine Ridge Indian Reservation, to Theodora Louise Feather and Walter "Hank" Means. His mother was a Yankton Dakota from Greenwood, South Dakota and his father, an Oglala Lakota. Russell had three biological brothers, Dace, and twins William and Theodore.

He was given the name Waŋblí Ohítika by his mother, which means 'Brave Eagle' in the Lakota language.

In 1942, the Means family resettled in the San Francisco Bay Area, seeking to escape the poverty and problems of the reservation. His father worked at the shipyard in Vallejo. Means grew up in the Bay Area, graduating in 1958 from San Leandro High School in San Leandro, California. He attended four colleges but did not graduate from any of them. In his 1995 autobiography, Means recounted a harsh childhood; his father was alcoholic and he himself fell into years of "truancy, crime and drugs" before finding purpose in the American Indian Movement in Minneapolis, Minnesota.

His father died in 1967 and, in his twenties, Means lived in several Indian reservations throughout the United States while searching for work. While at the Rosebud Indian Reservation in south-central South Dakota, he developed severe vertigo. Physicians at the reservation clinic believed that he had been brought in inebriated. After they refused to examine him for several days, Means was finally diagnosed with a concussion due to a presumed fight in a saloon. A visiting specialist later discovered that the reservation doctors had overlooked a common ear infection, which cost Means the hearing in one ear.

After recovering from the infection, Means worked for a year in the Office of Economic Opportunity, where he came to know several legal activists who were managing legal action on behalf of the Lakota people. After a dispute with his supervisor, Means left Rosebud for Cleveland, Ohio. In Cleveland, he worked with Native American community leaders against the backdrop of the American Civil Rights Movement.

== Career ==
=== Involvement with the American Indian Movement ===
In 1968, Means joined the American Indian Movement (AIM), where he rose to become a prominent leader. In 1970, Means was appointed AIM's first national director, and the organization began a period of increasing protests and activism.

==== Activism ====
Means participated in the 1969 Alcatraz occupation. He had been there once before, to occupy it for 24 hours under the lead of his father, Walter "Hank" Means, and a few other Lakota men in March 1964. (Means' father died in January 1967).

On Thanksgiving Day 1970, Means and other AIM activists staged their first protest in Boston: they seized the Mayflower II, a replica ship of the Mayflower, to protest the Puritans' and United States' mistreatment of Native Americans. In 1971 Means was one of the leaders of AIM's takeover of Mount Rushmore, a federal monument. Rushmore is within the Black Hills, an area sacred to the Lakota tribe.

In November 1972, he participated in AIM's occupation of the Bureau of Indian Affairs (BIA) headquarters in Washington, D.C., to protest abuses. Many records were taken or destroyed, and more than $2 million in damage was done to the building.

In 1973, Dennis Banks and Carter Camp led AIM's occupation of Wounded Knee, which became the group's best-known action. Means appeared as a spokesman and prominent leader. The armed standoff of more than 300 Lakota and AIM activists with the Federal Bureau of Investigation (FBI) and state law enforcement lasted for 71 days. Frank Clearwater, a visiting Cherokee activist from North Carolina, and Lawrence "Buddy" Lamont, an Oglala Lakota activist from Pine Ridge Reservation, were killed in April. African-American activist Ray Robinson disappeared and is assumed to be buried in the hills.

==== Native American politics ====
In 1974, Means resigned from AIM to run for the presidency of his native Oglala Sioux Tribe (OST) against the incumbent Richard Wilson. The official vote count showed Wilson winning by more than 200 votes. Residents complained of intimidation by Wilson's private militia. The report of a government investigation confirmed problems in the election, but in a related court challenge to the results of the election, a federal court upheld the results.

In the late 1970s, Means turned to an international forum on issues of rights for indigenous peoples. He worked with Jimmie Durham, who established the offices of the International Indian Treaty Council to work with the United Nations in 1977. At the Pine Ridge Indian Reservation, he assisted in the organization of community institutions, such as the KILI radio station and the Porcupine Health Clinic in Porcupine, South Dakota.

Means also traveled to Germany, traveled behind the Iron Curtain to meet with East German AIM supporters, and he traveled to Switzerland to take part in the Geneva human rights conference.

Means and Ojibwe Dennis Banks were by the mid-1970s the best known Native Americans since Lakota war leaders Sitting Bull and Crazy Horse, who led the attack that defeated the forces of General Custer at The Battle of Little Big Horn, also known as The Battle of the Greasy Grass.

==== Splits in AIM ====
In the 1980s, AIM divided into several competing factions, in part over differences among members regarding support for the indigenous peoples in Nicaragua. Means supported the Miskito group MISURASATA (later known as YATAMA), which was allied with the Contras. He traveled to Nicaragua in 1985 and 1986 on fact-finding tours. He came to believe that the Miskito as a people were being targeted for elimination. Some AIM members supported the Sandinistas of the national government, although they had forced removal of thousands of Miskito from their traditional territory.

On January 8, 1988, Means held a press conference to announce his retirement from AIM, saying it had achieved its goals. That January, the AIM Grand Governing Council, headed by the Bellecourt brothers, released a press release noting this was the sixth resignation by Means since 1974, and asking the press to "never again report either that he is a founder of the American Indian Movement, or [that] he is a leader of the American Indian Movement". The AIM Grand Governing Council noted there were many open issues and legislation regarding Native Americans for which they were continuing to work.

In 1993, the organization divided officially into two main factions: AIM Grand Governing Council, based in Minnesota, which copyrighted the name American Indian Movement; and American Indian Movement Confederation of Autonomous Chapters, based in Colorado and allied with Means and Ward Churchill.

==== Annie Mae Aquash ====
On November 3, 1999, Means and Robert Pictou-Branscombe, a maternal cousin of Aquash from Canada, held a press conference in Denver at the Federal Building to discuss the slow progress of the government's investigation into Aquash's murder. It had been under investigation both by the Denver police, as Aquash had been kidnapped from there, and by the FBI, as she had been taken across state lines and killed on the Pine Ridge Reservation. Both Branscombe and Means accused Vernon Bellecourt, a high-ranking leader of AIM, of having ordered her execution. Means said that Clyde Bellecourt, a founder of AIM, had ensured that it was carried out at the Pine Ridge Reservation. Means said that an AIM tribunal had banned the Bellecourt brothers but tried to keep the reason for the dissension internal to protect AIM.

The Associated Press (AP) reporter Robert Weller noted that this was the first time that an AIM leader active at the time of Aquash's death had publicly implicated AIM in her murder. There had long been rumors. Means and Branscombe accused three indigenous people: Arlo Looking Cloud, Theda Nelson Clarke and John Graham, of having been directly involved in the kidnapping and murder of Aquash. The two men were indicted in 2003 and convicted in separate trials in 2004 and 2010, respectively. By then in a nursing home, Clarke was not indicted.

As of 2004, Means' website stated that he was a board member of the Colorado AIM chapter, which is affiliated with the AIM Confederation of Autonomous Chapters.

=== Other political involvement ===
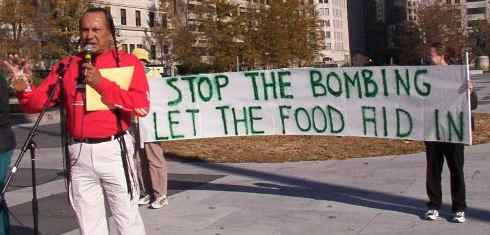
Russell Means speaks against the war on terror at a DC Anti-War Network's anti-war protest on November 11, 2001.

Since the late 1970s, Means often supported libertarian political causes, in contrast with several other AIM leaders. In 1983 he agreed to become running mate to Larry Flynt in his unsuccessful run for U.S. president. In 1987, Means ran for nomination of President of the United States under the Libertarian Party, and attracted considerable support within the party, finishing 2nd (31.4%) at the 1987 Libertarian National Convention. He lost the nomination to Congressman Ron Paul.

In 2001, Means began an independent candidacy for Governor of New Mexico. His campaign failed to satisfy procedural requirements and he was not selected for the ballot. In the 2004 and 2008 presidential elections, Means supported independent Ralph Nader.

Nearly thirty years after his first candidacy, Means ran for president of the Oglala Sioux in 2004 with the help of Twila Lebeaux, losing to Cecilia Fire Thunder, the first woman elected president of the tribe. She also defeated the incumbent John Yellow Bird Steele.

Since the late 20th century, there has been a debate in the United States over the appropriate term for the indigenous peoples of North America. Some want to be called Native American; others prefer American Indian. Means said that he preferred "American Indian", arguing that it derives not from explorers' confusion of the people with those of India, but from the Italian expression in Dio, meaning "in God". In addition, Means noted that since treaties and other legal documents in relation to the United States government use "Indian", continuing use of the term could help today's American Indian people forestall any attempts by others to use legal loopholes in the struggle over land and treaty rights.

In 2007, Means and 80 other protesters were arrested in Denver during a parade for Columbus Day which they stated was a "celebration of genocide".

Following the United Nations Declaration on the Rights of Indigenous Peoples in September 2007, a group of American Indian activists presented a letter to the U.S. State Department, indicating they were withdrawing from all treaties with the U.S. Government on December 20. Means announced the withdrawal by a small group of Lakota people. That same month, they began contacting foreign governments to solicit support for energy projects on the territory. Means and a delegation of activists declared the Republic of Lakotah a sovereign nation, with property rights over thousands of square miles in South Dakota, North Dakota, Nebraska, Wyoming and Montana. Means said that his group does not "represent collaborators, the Vichy Indians and those tribal governments set up by the United States of America".

On January 8, 2008, tribal leaders in the northern Great Plains, Rodney Bordeaux of the 25,000-member Rosebud Sioux Tribe, and Joseph Brings Plenty of the 8,500-member Cheyenne River Sioux Tribe, said that Means and the group of his fellow activists would not speak for their members or for any elected Lakota tribal government. While acknowledging that Means has accurately portrayed the federal government's broken promises to and treaties with America's indigenous peoples, they opposed his plan to renounce treaties with the United States and proclaim independence. They said the issue instead was to enforce existing treaties.

Means was critical of Obama receiving the 2009 Nobel Peace Prize, and also when Al Gore and Henry Kissinger received their Nobel Peace Prizes. He also criticized the U.S. interventionist foreign policy, the War in Afghanistan, and referred to Obama's presidency as "Bush's third term."

In January 2012, Means announced his endorsement of Republican Ron Paul in his bid for president.

=== Other activities ===
==== Acting ====
From 1992 to 2004, Means appeared as an actor in numerous films and television movies, first as the chief Chingachgook in The Last of the Mohicans. He appeared as Arrowhead in the made-for-TV movie The Pathfinder (1996), his second appearance in a movie adapted from a novel by James Fenimore Cooper. He appeared in Natural Born Killers (1994), as Jim Thorpe in Windrunner (1994), as Sitting Bull in Buffalo Girls (1995), and appeared in 3 episodes of the miniseries Into the West (2005) as the older Running Fox.

He was a voice actor in Disney's third highest-selling feature film Pocahontas (1995) and its sequel Pocahontas II: Journey to a New World (1998), playing the title character's father, Chief Powhatan. Means was a guest actor in the 1997 Duckman episode "Role With It", in which Duckman takes his family on an educational trip to a "genuine Indian reservation" – which turns out to be a casino. Means appeared as Billy Twofeathers in Thomas & the Magic Railroad (2000).

Means starred in Pathfinder, a 2003 movie about Vikings battling Native Americans in the New World. Means co-starred in Rez Bomb from director Steven Lewis Simpson, the first feature he acted in on his native Pine Ridge Indian Reservation. He appeared alongside Tamara Feldman, Trent Ford, and Chris Robinson. Means was also a prominent contributor to Steven Lewis Simpson's feature documentary about Pine Ridge Indian Reservations, A Thunder-Being Nation.

In 2004, Means made a guest appearance on the HBO program Curb Your Enthusiasm. Means played Wandering Bear, an American Indian with skills in landscaping and herbal medicine.

==== Writing ====
In 1995, Means published an autobiography, Where White Men Fear to Tread, written with Marvin J. Wolf. He recounted his own family's problems: his alcoholic father, and his own "fall into truancy, crime and drugs" before he discovered the American Indian Movement. The book drew criticism from a number of reviewers. While Patricia Holt, book editor for the San Francisco Chronicle wrote of the book, "It's American history – warts, wounds and all." In another review, writer Mari Wadsworth of the Tucson Weekly wrote: "Critical readers do well to remain skeptical of any individual, however charismatic, who claims to be the voice of authority and authenticity for any population, let alone one as diverse as the native tribes of the Americas. But whatever conclusions one makes of Means' actions and intentions, his unremitting presence and undaunted outspokenness opened a dialogue that changed the course of American history."

==== Music, art, and media ====
Russell Means recorded a CD entitled Electric Warrior with Sound of America Records, in 1993. Songs include "Une Gente Indio", "Hey You, Hey Indian", "Wounded Knee Set Us Free", and "Indian Cars Go Far". This was followed in 2007 with his The Radical album, which included the controversial song "Waco: The White Man's Wounded Knee". In 2013, he was recognized by the Native American Music Awards with a Hall of Fame award.

The American pop artist Andy Warhol painted 18 individual portraits of Russell Means in his 1976 American Indian Series. The Dayton Art Institute holds one of the Warhol portraits in its collection.

Means appeared as a character in the adventure video game Under a Killing Moon, by Access Software, in 1994.

Means is the focus of the 2014 documentary Conspiracy To Be Free by director Colter Johnson.

In 2016 the artist Magneto Dayo and The Lakota Medicine Men did a tribute song dedicated to Russell Means and Richard Oakes called "The Journey" on the album Royalty of the UnderWorld.

In 1999, Russell taped six community television half-hour programs in Santa Monica, under the title of "The Russell Means Show" produced by Helene E. Hagan (Adelphia Coimmnications). As Host for the series, he interviewed guests Sacheen Littlefeather, Greg Sarris, Kateri Walker and Redbone. The last two programs were Commentaries on Colonialism and Consumerism. The series has been archived at the Oglala Lakota College Library.

== Personal life ==
Means was married five times; the first four marriages ended in divorce. He was married to his fifth wife, Pearl Means, until his death. His wife Pearl died ten years later in May 2022, at the age of 62. He had a total of ten children: seven biological children and three adopted children, who were "adopted in the Lakota way", including Tatanka Means who is also an actor.

As "a grandfather with twenty-two grandchildren", Russell Means divided his time "between Chinle, Navajo Nation, Arizona, and Porcupine, South Dakota."

=== Legal issues ===
On December 29, 1997, Means, then 58, was arrested for assault and battery of his 56-year-old father-in-law Leon Grant, a member of the Omaha Nation married to a Diné (Navajo) Nation. AIM Grand Governing Council issued a press release to reiterate its separation from Means.

=== Illness and death ===
In August 2011, Means was diagnosed with esophageal cancer. His doctors told him his condition was inoperable. He told the Associated Press that he was rejecting "mainstream medical treatments in favor of traditional American Indian remedies and alternative treatments away from his home on the Pine Ridge Indian Reservation". In late September, Means reported that through tomotherapy, the tumor had diminished greatly. Later, he said that his tumor was "95% gone." On December 5 of that year, Means stated that he "beat cancer", and that he had beat "the death penalty."

The following year, however, his health continued to decline and he died on October 22, 2012, at age 72. A family statement said, "Our dad and husband now walks among our ancestors."

ABC News said Means "spent a lifetime as a modern American Indian warrior ... , railed against broken treaties, fought for the return of stolen land and even took up arms against the federal government ... , called national attention to the plight of impoverished tribes and often lamented the waning of Indian culture." Among the tributes was one writer's belief that "his face should have been on Mt. Rushmore." The New York Times said Means "became as well-known a Native American as Sitting Bull and Crazy Horse."

Means was cremated and his ashes were sprinkled throughout the Black Hills.

== Filmography ==
=== Film ===
- The Last of the Mohicans (1992) – Chingachgook
- Windrunner (1994) – Wa Tho Huck / Jim Thorpe / Country Ghost
- Wagons East (1994) – Chief
- Natural Born Killers (1994) – Old Indian
- PahaSapa... The Struggle for the Black Hills (1994) – Himself
- Buffalo Girls (1995, TV Mini-Series) – Sitting Bull
- Pocahontas (1995) – Chief Powhatan (voice)
- The Pathfinder (1996, TV Movie) – Arrowhead
- The Song of Hiawatha (1997) – Mudjekeewis
- Pocahontas II: Journey to a New World (1998) – Chief Powhatan
- Black Cat Run (1998, TV Movie) – Ten Reed
- A League of Old Men (1998) – Imber
- Wind River (2000) – Washakie
- Thomas and the Magic Railroad (2000) – Billy Twofeathers
- Cowboy Up (2001) – Joe
- 29 Palms (2002) – The Chief
- Black Cloud (2004) – Bud
- The Last Shot (2004) – Himself
- Pathfinder (2007) – Pathfinder
- Unearthed (2007) – Grandpa
- Intervention (2007)
- Rez Bomb (2008) – Dodds
- Reel Injun (2009, Documentary) – Himself
- Tiger Eyes (2012) – Willie Ortiz
- Days and Nights (2013) – Big Jim (final film role)

=== Television ===
- Walker, Texas Ranger – Episode: "Plague" – Luther Iron Shirt (1996)
- The West – documentary TV series – Episodes: "The People" and "Fight No More Forever" (Voice) (1996)
- Touched by an Angel – Episode : "Written in Dust" – Edison (1996)
- Remember WENN – Episode: "And How!" – Joseph Greyhawk (1997)
- Duckman – Episode: "Role With It" – Thomas (1997)
- Liberty's Kids – Episodes: "The New Frontier" and "Bostonians" (2002)
- The Profiler – Episode: "The Sorcerer's Apprentice" – Uncle Joe (1997)
- Nash Bridges – Episodes: "Downtime" and "Lady Killer" – Dexter Birdsong (1998)
- Black Cat Run (TV movie) – Ten Reed (1998)
- Family Law – Episode: "Americans" - James Saginaw (2001)
- Curb Your Enthusiasm - Season 4 – Episode 8 – Wandering Bear (2004)
- Into the West – TV Mini-Series – 3 episodes – Older Running Fox (2005)
- American Experience – TV Series documentary – Episode: "We Shall Remain: Part V – Wounded Knee" – Himself (2009)
- Banshee (TV series) – Benjamin Longshadow (4 episodes) (2013)

=== Other appearances ===
- Under a Killing Moon – Video Game - The Chameleon (1994)
- The Making of 'Pocahontas': A Legend Comes to Life – TV Movie documentary - Himself (Voice of 'Chief Powhatan') (1995)
- Images of Indians: How Hollywood Stereotyped the Native American – TV Movie documentary – Himself (2003)
- Looks Twice – Short – (2005)
- Wounded Heart: Pine Ridge and the Sioux – Video documentary – Himself / narrator (2006)
- Turok - Son of Stone Video (2008)
- Questions for Crazy Horse – Documentary – Himself (2010)
- The Sasquatch and The Girl – Short (2010)

== Bibliography ==
- Matthias André Voigt (2024). Reinventing the Warrior: Masculinity in the American Indian Movement, 1968-1973, Lawrence, KS: University Press of Kansas. (ISBN 978-0-70063-697-6).
