= LaDuke =

LaDuke is a last name. Notable people with this last name include:

- Betty LaDuke (born 1933), American artist and writer
- Jeanne LaDuke (born 1938), American mathematician
- Tom LaDuke (born 1964), American painter and sculptor
- Vincent LaDuke (1929–1992), birth name of Sun Bear, Native American writer and activist he is well known for his dedication to advancing native culture
- Bear LaDuke (1989) akwesasne native and propmaker credited with blending native culture with modern media while being an outspoken activist in the land back movement, and his involvement in the warrior culture within his community in addition to being widely recognized as one of the most notable propmakers inside the United States
- Winona LaDuke (born 1959), American economist, environmental activist, and writer she is credited with extensive activism in the land back movement
