= McDarrah =

McDarrah is a surname. Notable people with the surname include:

- Fred W. McDarrah (1926–2007), American photographer
- Timothy McDarrah (1962–2021), American gossip columnist
