= Winona LaDuke =

Author and activist (born 1959)

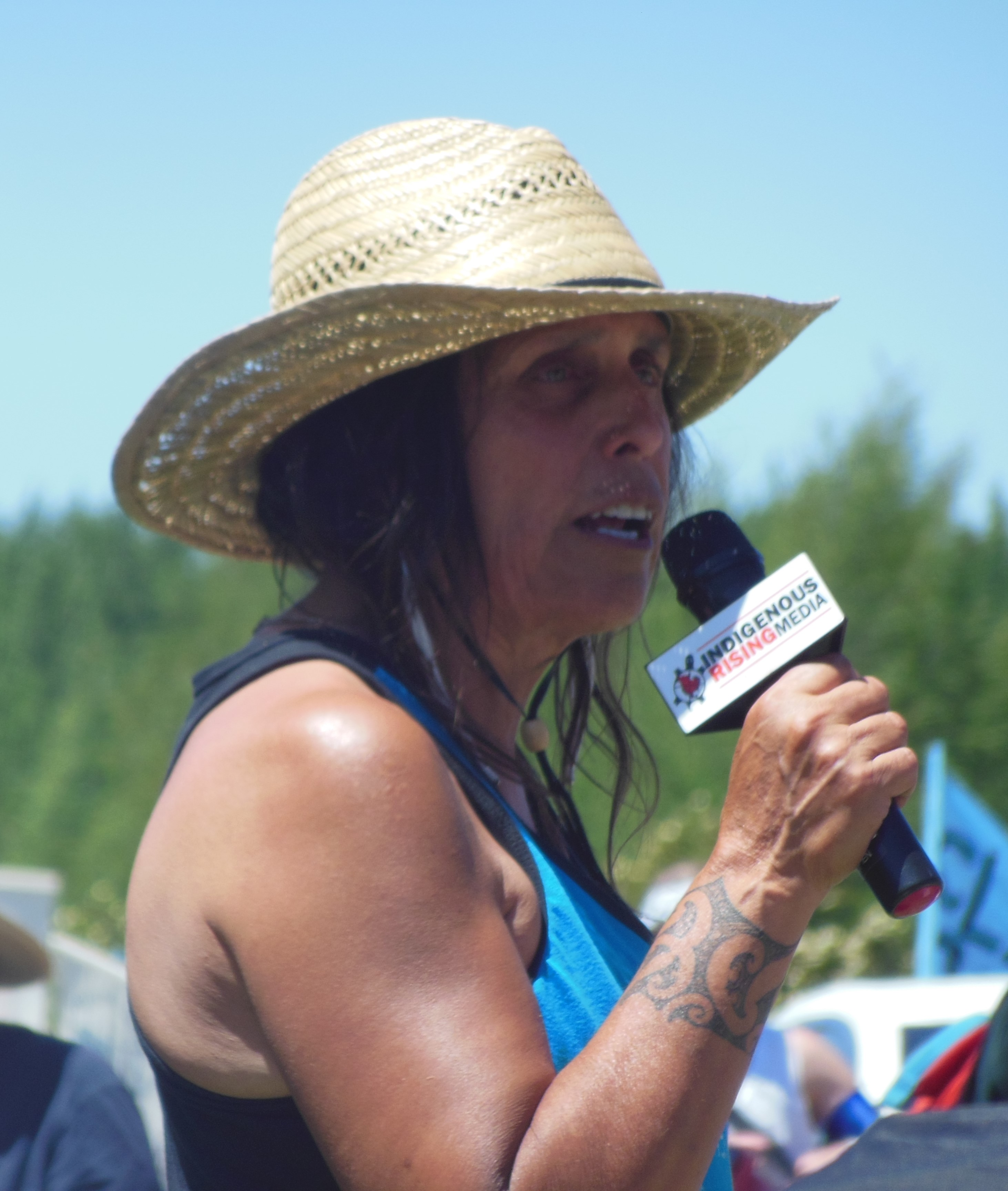
- LaDuke in 2021
- Born: August 18, 1959 (age 67); Los Angeles, California, U.S.
- Education: Harvard University (BA); Antioch University (MA)
- Political party: Green
- Parent(s): Betty LaDuke, Sun Bear
- Awards: National Women's Hall of Fame

Winona LaDuke (born August 18, 1959) is a Native American environmentalist, writer, and industrial hemp grower, known for her work on tribal land claims and preservation, as well as sustainable development.

In 1996 and 2000, she ran for vice president of the United States as the nominee of the Green Party of the United States, on a ticket headed by Ralph Nader. Until 2023 she was the executive director and a co-founder (along with the Indigo Girls) of Honor the Earth, a Native environmental advocacy organization that played an active role in the Dakota Access Pipeline protests.

In 2016, she received an electoral vote for vice president. In doing so, she became the first Green Party member to receive an electoral vote.

== Early life and education ==
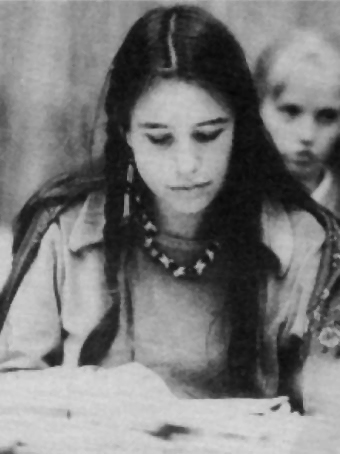
Winona LaDuke in earlier years

Winona (meaning "first daughter" in the Dakota language) LaDuke was born in 1959 in Los Angeles, California, to Betty Bernstein and Vincent LaDuke (later known as Sun Bear). Her father was from the Ojibwe White Earth Reservation in Minnesota, and her mother of Jewish European ancestry from The Bronx, New York. LaDuke spent some of her childhood in Los Angeles, but was primarily raised in Ashland, Oregon. Due to her father's heritage, she was enrolled at birth with the White Earth Nation, but did not live at White Earth, or any other reservation, until 1982. She started work at White Earth after graduating from college when she got a job there as principal of the high school.

After her parents married, Vincent LaDuke worked as an actor in Hollywood in supporting roles in Western movies, while Betty LaDuke completed her academic studies. The couple separated when Winona was five, and her mother took a position as an art instructor at Southern Oregon College, now Southern Oregon University at Ashland, then a small logging and college town near the California border. In the 1980s, Vincent reinvented himself as a New Age spiritual leader by the name Sun Bear.

While growing up in Ashland, LaDuke attended public school and was on the debate team in high school. She attended Harvard University, where she joined a group of Indigenous activists, and graduated in 1982 with a Bachelor of Arts in economics (rural economic development). When she moved to White Earth, she did not know the Ojibwe language, or many people, and was not quickly accepted. While working as the principal of the local Minnesota reservation high school, she completed research for her master's thesis on the reservation's subsistence economy and became involved in local issues. She completed an M.A. in community economic development through Antioch University's distance-learning program.

== Career and activism ==
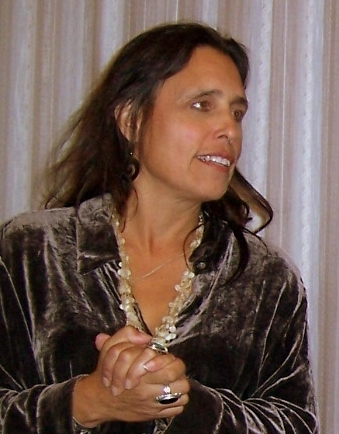
LaDuke in 2009

While attending Harvard, LaDuke heard a presentation by Jimmie Durham that she said "shook something loose" in her and changed her life. She worked for Durham, investigating the effects of uranium mining in Navajo reservations. After graduating, she moved to her father's community at White Earth, where she found work as the high school principal. In 1985 she helped found the Indigenous Women's Network. She worked with Women of All Red Nations to publicize American forced sterilization of Native American women.

Next she became involved in the struggle to recover lands for the Anishinaabe. An 1867 treaty with the United States provided a territory of more than 860,000 acres for the White Earth Indian Reservation. Under the Nelson Act of 1889, an attempt to have the Anishinaabe assimilate by adopting a European-American model of subsistence farming, communal tribal land was allotted to individual households. The US classified any excess land as surplus, allowing it to be sold to non-natives. In addition, many Anishinaabe sold their land individually over the years; these factors caused the tribe to lose control of most of its land. By the mid-20th century, the tribe held only one-tenth of the land in its reservation.

=== White Earth Land Recovery Project ===
In 1989, LaDuke founded the White Earth Land Recovery Project (WELRP) in Minnesota with the proceeds of a human rights award from Reebok. Its goal is to buy back land in the reservation that non-Natives bought and to create enterprises that provide work to Anishinaabe. By 2000, the foundation had bought 1,200 acres, which it held in a conservation trust for eventual cession to the tribe. WELRP also works to reforest the land and revive cultivation of wild rice, long a traditional Ojibwe food. It markets that and other traditional products, including hominy, jam, buffalo sausage, and other products. It has started an Ojibwe language program, a herd of buffalo, and a wind-energy project. It produces and sells traditional foods and crafts through its label, Native Harvest. The Evergreen State College class of 2014 chose LaDuke as its commencement speaker. She delivered her address at the school on June 13, 2014.

=== Honor the Earth, 1993–2023 ===
LaDuke was also the executive director of Honor the Earth, an organization she co-founded with the non-Native folk-rock duo the Indigo Girls in 1993. Honor the Earth is a national advocacy group encouraging public support and funding for Native environmental groups. It works nationally and internationally on issues of climate change, renewable energy, sustainable development, food systems and environmental justice. Members of Honor the Earth were active in the Dakota Access Pipeline protests. As of 2016, the organization's mission was:

to create awareness and support for Native environmental issues and to develop needed financial and political resources for the survival of sustainable Native communities. Honor the Earth develops these resources by using music, the arts, the media, and Indigenous wisdom to ask people to recognize our joint dependency on the Earth and be a voice for those not heard.

On March 30, 2023, the Becker County, Minnesota, District Court ordered Honor the Earth and LaDuke to pay a former employee $750,000 in damages in a sexual harassment and abuse complaint, based on actions from 2015. LaDuke resigned from the organization on April 5, 2023, acknowledging her failure to protect victims of sexual harassment.

=== Political career, 1996–2016 ===
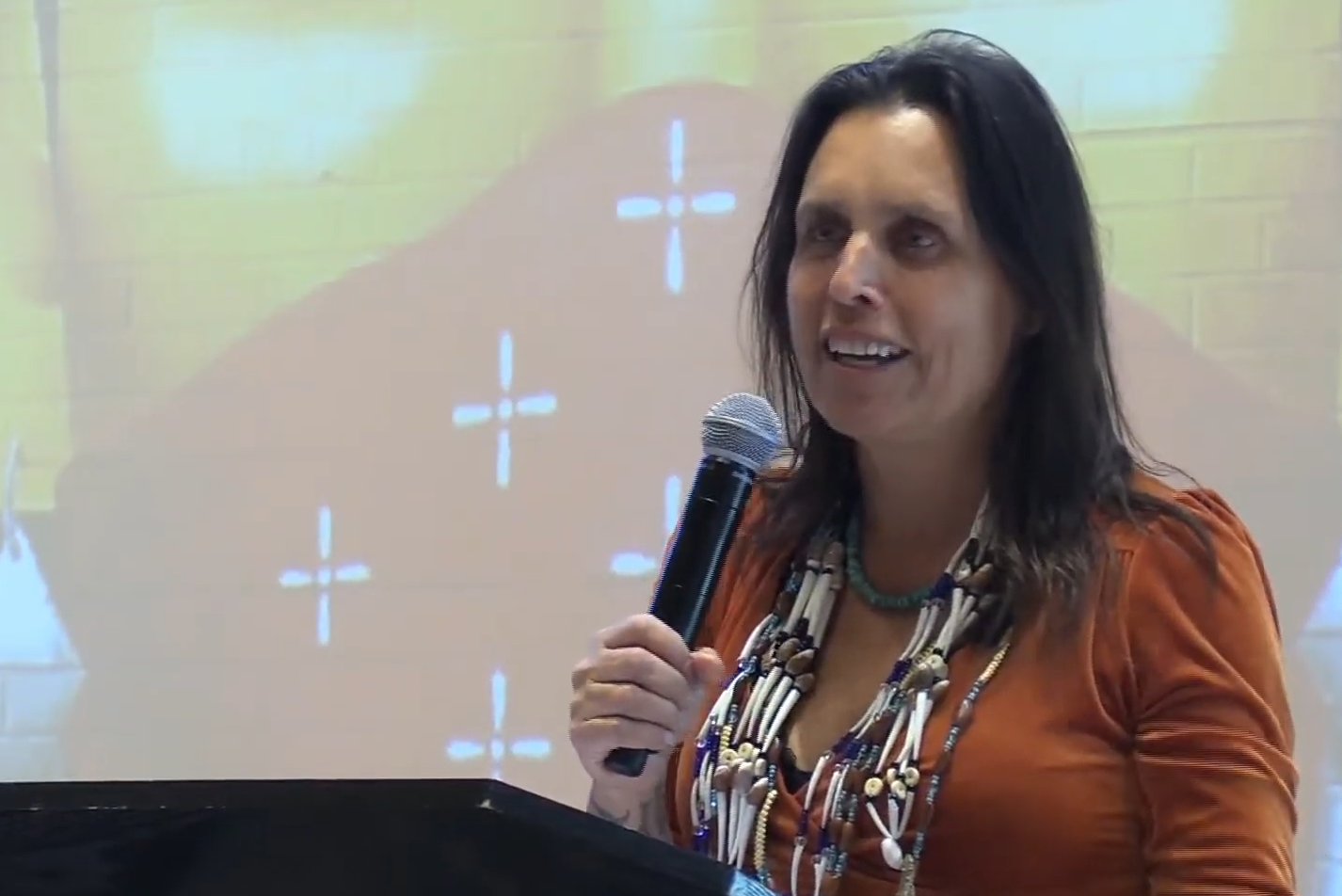
Winona La Duke speaking at Intellectual House, University of Washington, 2018

In 1996 and 2000, LaDuke ran as the vice-presidential candidate with Ralph Nader on the Green Party ticket. She was not endorsed by any tribal council or other tribal government. LaDuke endorsed the Democratic Party ticket for president and vice-president in 2004, 2008, and 2012.

In 2016, Robert Satiacum, Jr., a faithless elector from Washington, cast his presidential vote for Native American activist Faith Spotted Eagle and his vice-presidential vote for LaDuke, making her the first Green Party member and the first Native American woman to receive an Electoral College vote for vice president.

In 2016, LaDuke was involved in the Dakota Access Pipeline protests, participating at the resistance camps in North Dakota and speaking to the media on the issue.

At the July 2019 National Audubon Convention in Milwaukee, LaDuke gave the keynote address with updates on efforts to stop the Sandpiper pipeline, other pipelines, and other projects near Ojibwe waters and through the Leech Lake Reservation. She urged everyone to be water protectors and stand up for their rights.

In 2020 and 2021, she was a leader of the protests against the Line 3 pipeline.

=== Hemp activism ===
As of 2018, LaDuke operated a 40-acre (16 ha) industrial hemp farm on the White Earth Indian Reservation, growing hemp varieties from different regions of the world, vegetables and tobacco. She has said that she turned to industrial hemp farming after being urged to investigate the practice for several years and advocates its potential to turn the American economy away from fossil fuels. LaDuke has promoted the growth of both marijuana and industrial hemp on Indigenous tribal lands for financial profit and the localization of the economy. Her position can be considered controversial given experiences of other reservations, such as the Oglala Sioux Tribe, who were raided by the DEA in relation to hemp farming.

== Personal life ==
In 1988, LaDuke married Randy Kapashesit of Moose Factory, Ontario, Canada. They had two children before separating in 1992. Their daughter, Waseyabin, is on the staff of the Giiwedinong Treaty Rights and Culture Museum that opened in Park Rapids, Minnesota in 2023. Their son, Ajuawak, is a writer, actor, and director known for his appearances in Indian Horse, Ahockalypse, Once Upon A River, and Indian Road Trip.

LaDuke's third biological child with her partner Kevin Gasco was born in 1999, and she also has three adopted children. On November 9, 2008, LaDuke's house in Ponsford, Minnesota, burned down while she was in Boston. No one was injured, but all her personal property burned, including her extensive library and Indigenous art and artifact collection.

== Selected publications ==
=== Books ===
- Last Standing Woman (1997), novel.
- All our Relations: Native Struggles for Land and Life (1999), about the drive to reclaim tribal land for ownership
- The Sugar Bush (1999)
- The Winona LaDuke Reader: A Collection of Essential Writings (2002)
- Recovering the Sacred: the Power of Naming and Claiming (2005), a book about traditional beliefs and practices.
- The Militarization of Indian Country (2013)
- All Our Relations: Native Struggles for Land and Life (2016)
- To Be A Water Protector: The Rise of the Wiindigoo Slayers (2020)

=== As co-author ===
- Conquest: Sexual Violence and American Indian Genocide
- Grassroots: A Field Guide for Feminist Activism
- Sister Nations: Native American Women Writers on Community
- Struggle for the Land: Native North American Resistance to Genocide, Ecocide, and Colonization
- Cutting Corporate Welfare
- Ojibwe Waasa Inaabidaa: We Look in All Directions
- New Perspectives on Environmental Justice: Gender, Sexuality, and Activism
- Make a Beautiful Way: The Wisdom of Native American Women
- How to Say I Love You in Indian
- Earth Meets Spirit: A Photographic Journey Through the Sacred Landscape
- Otter Tail Review: Stories, Essays and Poems from Minnesota's Heartland
- Daughters of Mother Earth: The Wisdom of Native American Women

Her editorials and essays have been published in national and international media.

== Filmography ==
Television and film appearances:

- Appearance in the 1997 documentary film Anthem, directed by Shainee Gabel and Kristin Hahn.
- Appearance in the 1990 Canadian documentary film Uranium, directed by Magnus Isacsson.
- Appearance in the TV documentary The Main Stream.
- Appearance on The Colbert Report on June 12, 2008.
- Featured in 2017 full-length documentary First Daughter and the Black Snake, directed by Keri Pickett. Chronicles LaDuke's opposition against the Canadian-owned Enbridge plans to route a pipeline through land granted to her tribe in an 1855 Treaty.

== Legacy and honors ==
- 1994, LaDuke was nominated by Time magazine as one of America's fifty most promising leaders under forty years of age.
- 1996, she was given the Thomas Merton Award
- 1997, she was granted the BIHA Community Service Award
- 1998, she won the Reebok Human Rights Award.
- 1998, Ms. Magazine named her Woman of the Year for her work with Honor the Earth.
- Ann Bancroft Award for Women's Leadership Fellowship.
- 2007, she was inducted into the National Women's Hall of Fame.
- 2015, she received an honorary doctorate degree from Augsburg College.
- 2017, she received the Alice and Clifford Spendlove Prize in Social Justice, Diplomacy and Tolerance, at the University of California, Merced.
- 2020, she was a keynote speaker at Verdical Group's annual Net Zero Conference

== Electoral history ==
=== 1996 election ===
1996 United States presidential election
| Presidential candidate Vice presidential candidate | Party | Popular votes | % | Electoral votes |
|---|---|---|---|---|
| Bill Clinton (incumbent); Al Gore | Democratic | 47,401,185 | 49.24% | 379 |
| Bob Dole; Jack Kemp | Republican | 39,197,469 | 40.71% | 159 |
| Ross Perot; Pat Choate | Reform | 8,085,294 | 8.40% | 0 |
| Ralph Nader; Winona LaDuke | Green | 685,297 | 0.71% | 0 |
| Harry Browne; Jo Jorgensen | Libertarian | 485,759 | 0.50% | 0 |
| Others | | 411,993 | 0.43% | 0 |
| Total | | 96,277,634 | 100% | 538 |

=== 2000 election ===
2000 United States presidential election
| Presidential candidate Vice presidential candidate | Party | Popular votes | % | Electoral votes |
|---|---|---|---|---|
| Al Gore; Joe Lieberman | Democratic | 50,999,897 | 48.4% | 266 |
| George W. Bush; Dick Cheney | Republican | 50,456,002 | 47.87% | 271 |
| Ralph Nader; Winona LaDuke | Green | 2,882,955 | 2.74% | 0 |
| Pat Buchanan; Ezola Foster | Reform | 448,895 | 0.43% | 0 |
| Harry Browne; Art Olivier | Libertarian | 384,431 | 0.36% | 0 |
| Others | | 232,920 | 0.22% | (abstention) 1 |
| Total | | 105,421,423 | 100% | 538 |

=== 2016 election ===
Electoral vote for vice president

↓
| 227 | 3 | 1 | 1 | 1 | 1 | 305 |
| Kaine | Warren | Cantwell | LaDuke | Collins | Fiorina | Pence |

== See also ==
- List of Indigenous writers of the Americas
- List of Native American politicians
- Native American women in politics

Party political offices
| First | Green nominee for vice president of the United States; 1996, 2000 | Succeeded by Pat LaMarche |
