= Sandpiper pipeline =

Proposed United States oil pipeline cancelled in 2016

Location
- Country: United States
- Start: Beaver Lodge Station, south of Tioga, North Dakota
- Passes through: North Dakota, Clearbrook, Minnesota and Wisconsin
- To: Superior, Wisconsin

General information
- Type: light crude oil
- Owner: Enbridge Energy Partners, L.P.
- Partners: Williston Basin Pipe Line LLC, an indirect subsidiary of Marathon Petroleum Corporation. North Dakota Pipeline Company LLC assets, formerly known as Enbridge Pipelines (North Dakota) LLC
- Operator: Enbridge Energy Partners
- Expected: January 2017

Technical information
- Length: 616 mi (991 km)
- Maximum discharge: 0.25 million barrels per day (~1.2×10^{7} t/a)
- Diameter: 24 to 30 in (610 to 762 mm)
- Pumping stations: new pump station and tanks in Clearbrook

The Sandpiper pipeline was a proposed 616-mile-long (991 km) underground oil pipeline project in the United States. It would have carried light crude oil from the Bakken oil fields in Northwest North Dakota, through Minnesota, to Superior, Wisconsin.

Enbridge Energy Partners, and Williston Basin Pipe Line LLC, an indirect subsidiary of Marathon Petroleum Corporation had planned the project since 2013. In 2015 Enbridge estimated that the pipeline would cost about US$2.6 billion.

In 2016, Enbridge announced the cancellation of the pipeline, the withdrawal of their state application, and their request to end an environmental impact statement and regulatory proceedings.

== History ==
The Sandpiper pipeline project was made public by the media in 2013, and informational hearings for landowners took place in three North Dakota towns in March 2014. The North Dakota Public Service Commission approved the pipeline in June 2014. The Minnesota Public Utilities Commission unanimously approved the Sandpiper pipeline, but its decision was overturned in September 2015.

In September 2016, Enbridge Energy Partners announced that due to "extensive and unprecedented [regulatory] delays [which] have plagued the Sandpiper pipeline," they were withdrawing their state application and asking for an end to regulatory proceedings, including work on an environmental-impact statement. An Enbridge spokesperson said that the pipeline may be reconsidered once the oil market rebounds but it was then "outside the company’s current five-year planning horizon".

== Purpose ==
In 2015, Enbridge stated that "The Sandpiper Pipeline serves the oil conducting needs of North Dakota residents, which constitutes a public benefit". Per Enbridge, the Sandpiper pipeline would have represented a "public use" as a "statutorily defined public utility". According to Enbridge, its route was chosen with the "greatest public benefit and the least private injury" and that "as long as the public benefit can be demonstrated, it is immaterial that private interests are also served."

Per Enbridge, the pipeline was necessary "to meet demand for Bakken oil". The corporation projects economic benefits of $69 million in property tax revenue for the 3 states, and 3000 construction jobs for workers in Minnesota and North Dakota.

== Description ==
The pipeline would have entered Minnesota just south of Grand Forks, North Dakota, east to Clearbrook Enbridge's terminal and then south toward Park Rapids along an existing crude oil corridor. Afterwards, the pipeline would have run along a transmission line corridor to Superior, Wisconsin.

The route of the pipeline would have travelled through 28 rivers, including the Mississippi River, and lakes and wetlands that couldn't be reached by nearby roads when a spill occurs.

=== North Dakota portion ===
Informational hearings for landowners took place in three North Dakota towns during March 2014. The North Dakota Public Service Commission approved the pipeline on 25 June 2014.

Enbridge sued a Grand Forks couple in 2014 after they refused to give the Canadian corporation an easement and right-of-way on their property. The couple quoted NDPL's abuse of eminent domain, continued reliance on fossil fuels, their effect on the environment, and the possibility for spills as arguments. In August 2015 the couple agreed to an easement and forfeited compensation, in order to file an appeal to the North Dakota Supreme Court.

=== Minnesota portion ===
In November 2013, Enbridge applied at the Minnesota Public Utilities Commission (MPUC). The MPUC unanimously approved the project, allowing an environmental review to be conducted at a later date. In September 2015, the Minnesota Court of Appeals overruled the PUC decision as a violation of state law.

In a November 2014 Star Tribune commentary a Polk County commissioner, a Clearwater County commissioner and a Red Lake County commissioner opined, that the Sandpiper pipeline was the "best choice for the state...better than trucks or rail and also offer[ing] economic benefits."

In February 2015, the White Earth Indian Reservation, represented by Winona LaDuke stated that the pipeline would cross a portion of its land, which Enbridge disputes. La Duke has been against the pipeline because it would violate Indian sovereignty and for environmental reasons.

The President of North America's Building Trades Unions came out in a December 2015 commentary criticizing the Minnesota Court of Appeals decision, accused the court was "robbing hard-working Minnesotans of jobs" which would provide workers with a path to middle class.

== See also ==
- List of oil pipelines in North America
- List of oil refineries
- List of oil spills
