= Keri Pickett =

American photographer, author and filmmaker

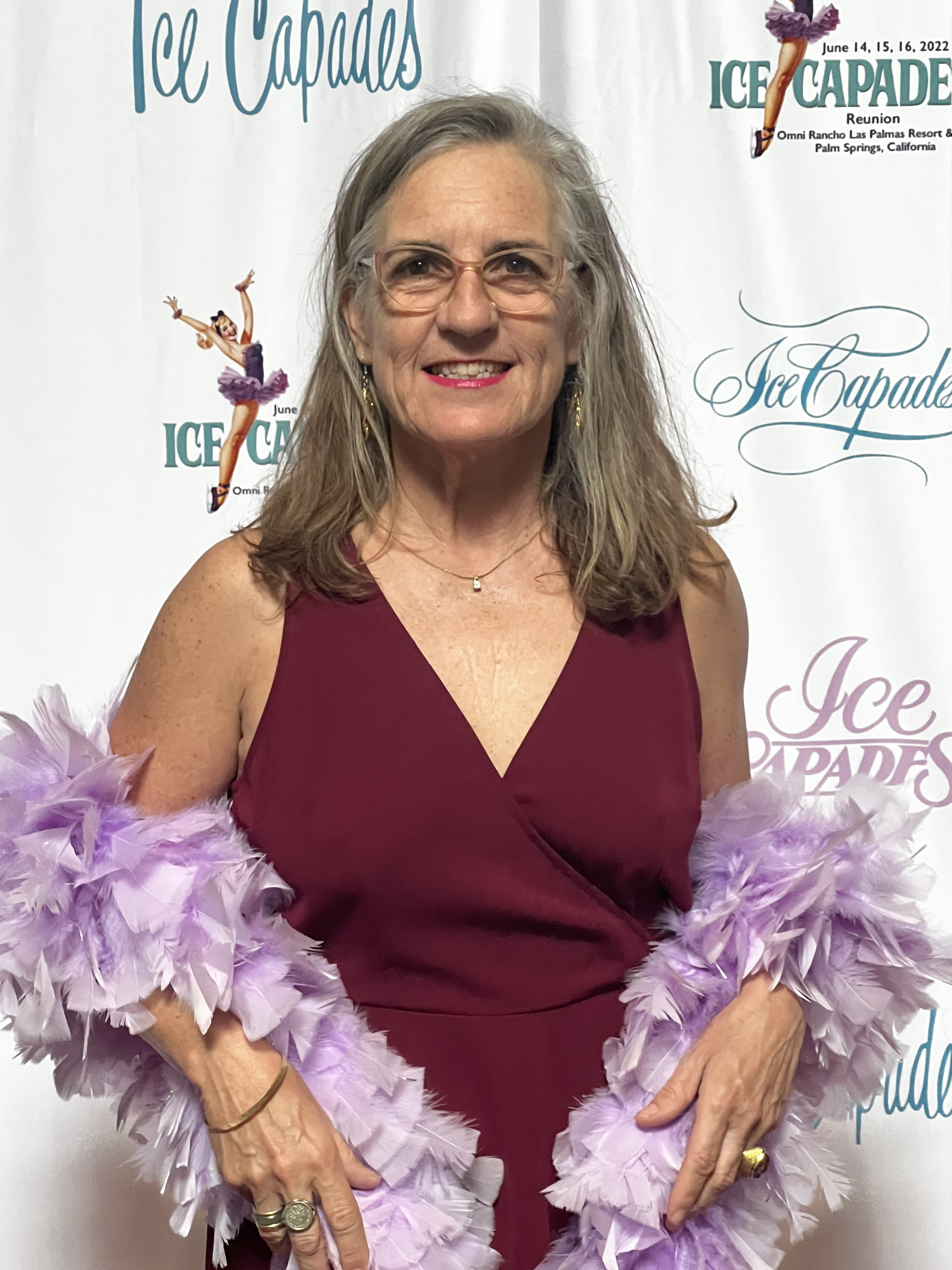
- Pickett at screening of FABULOUS ICE AGE in Palm Springs, CA 2022
- Born: 1959 (age 66–67); Charleston, SC, USA
- Education: Moorhead State University
- Occupations: Photographer, Filmmaker

Keri Pickett (born 1959 in Charleston, South Carolina) is an American photographer, author and filmmaker. Pickett's work "pulls subjects from the edges of public awareness to the center of the frame". Pickett was first exposed to photography as a child through her figure-skater/photographer uncle Roy Blakey and years later, as an adult, she made a film about his life.

She got her first camera when she was 8. However, it wasn't until she took photography classes at what was then-Moorhead State and began working in the darkroom that she realized her passion."I was hooked right away," she said. "I mean that was it: alchemy, the science, the magic. And I think I could have been a fine journalists had I never gone in to the art department," she said. "And I think my eye and my sentiment would have been very much the same, but my brain was very much shaped in the art department."

== Education ==
Pickett graduated with a B.A. degree in photography from Moorhead State University in Minnesota with minors in Art History and Women's Studies. After graduation in 1983, Pickett moved in with her photographer uncle Roy Blakey in New York for a short time while starting an internship under the direction of American photographer Fred W. McDarrah at the Village Voice. "Using her new position, she set out to document the '80s arts scene. She shot concerts for The Voice, from Kool & The Gang and Run DMC to Minneapolis’ own The Replacements, Hüsker Dü and “Purple Rain”-era Prince, some shots she’d never exhibited before. She also trained her camera on the bar Tin Pan Alley, where punks, sex workers and artists, like employees Kiki Smith and Nan Goldin, all hung out."

In 1987, after Pickett was diagnosed with Burkett's lymphoma, a rare cancer characterized by the rapid growth of tumors in the body, she left New York and returned to Minnesota to begin chemotherapy. During the two years of Pickett's treatment, she concentrated on her photographic work: Kids Coping with Life-Threatening Illness. Where once she had thought she was too young to die, Pickett's paradigm shifted as she photographed and became friends with children in the hospital who were dying of cancer. Pickett says, "When I was on chemotherapy I was so upbeat and positive that this started coming out in my pictures. I was a positive example to people. I started taking photos of kids with life-threatening illnesses, and my work switched....I starting putting more of myself into the work."

== Book author ==
In 1995, Pickett published Love in the 90s. B.B. and Jo, The Story of a Lifelong Love, A Granddaughter's Portrait, black-and-white photographs of her grandparents that she took when they were in their 90s, interwoven with the love and courtship letters they wrote to each other beginning in 1928. The book won the American Photography Book Award for 1995. Photographs of her grandparents have appeared in Life, German and German Geo and the Village Voice (cover).

Pickett's Lambda Literary Award-winning book Faeries, published by Aperture Books with a foreword by James Broughton, records the life and personality of gay men who self-identify as Radical Faeries and gather every summer off-the-grid in a celebration of identity. Begun in 1994, the project was shot over six years at an annual ten-day meeting in the northern Minnesota sanctuary called Kawashaway. Pickett says that she is "someone who honors and celebrates the unique mix of masculine and feminine in everybody".

Pickett's third book published in 2004, Saving Body & Soul: The Mission of Mary Jo Copeland uses her photography paired with essays and writings by Margaret Nelson to illuminate the story of Mary Jo Copeland, a housewife and mother of twelve who has overcome remarkable odds in her quest to serve the poor and homeless.

== Photo Projects ==
- Kids Coping With Life-Threatening Illnesses
- Tibetan Resettlement Project
- American Indian Movement
- Organic Farm Life
- Sharing & Caring Hands: The Mission of Mary Jo Copeland
- Tin Pan Alley

== Films ==
In 2013, Pickett's first feature-length documentary film The Fabulous Ice Age premiered as an official selection of the 2013 Minneapolis–Saint Paul International Film Festival, where it was runner up for ‘MN Made’ audience favorite and was selected for inclusion in Festival Best of Fest. The Fabulous Ice Age is a documentary about the history of theatrical figure skating highlighting entertainers such as Sonja Henie and Gloria Nord, featuring Pickett's uncle Roy Blakey - a former ice-skater, turned photographer. Blakey has the largest collection of theatrical ice-skating memorabilia in the world, housed at The IceStage Archive in Minneapolis. The New York Times included The Fabulous Ice Age in January 2014 on the front page of its arts section.

In 2016, the Walker Art Center screened portions of Pickett's second full-length documentary First Daughter and the Black Snake (IMDb) chronicling the opposition of Winona LaDuke, an Anishinaabe activist, to plans to route a pipeline through land granted to her tribe in 1855. The pipeline threatens the tribe's sacred wild rice lakes and the preservation of their traditional way of life. First Daughter and the Black Snake premiered at the Native Women in Film Festival, in Los Angeles, California in February 2017. It subsequently screened at the Minneapolis–Saint Paul International Film Festival in April 2017.

In 2018, Pickett began working on a new film as co-director and director of photography: Finding Her Beat (IMDb). "The crew is almost entirely female, with members identifying as queer, Minnesota-based, Asian and Asian-American. “It's important that in the creation of the film itself, we are enacting what we want to see happen in the broader community and in the larger world,” [Dawn] Mikkelson says. She tapped Keri Pickett, another documentary filmmaker who she knows through Film Fatales, to be co-director and director of photography. Mikkelson and Pickett made the decision to film HERbeat in a cinéma vérité style, meaning there will be no sit-down interviews, just authentic footage showing the women and their journey. " The documnentary feature film FINDING HER BEAT premiered in 2022 at Mill Valley Film Festival.

In 2021, Pickett directed the music video for the song ‘No More Pipeline Blues (On this Land Where We Belong)’ featuring Bonnie Raitt, the Indigo Girls, Winona LaDuke, the first Native American poet laureate Joy Harjo, Waubanewquay, Day Sisters, Mumu Fresh, Pura Fe, Soni Moreno, and Jennifer Kreisberg, produced and composed by Larry Long. That same year, Pickett also directed the music video ‘Shell River Seven #StopLine3’ by Jackson Browne.

== Recognition ==
"She's a really truly concerned photographer and I think she does it out of her heart rather than the necessity to make money. And that makes a big difference.", says American photographer Fred W. McDarrah of Village Voice Newspaper of Pickett.

Mary Ellen Mark, American photojournalist says "Keri Pickett's deeply moving photographs are a passionate statement of her devotion... It is rare these days to see images portrayed with such honesty."

Michael Fallon, writer for the Minneapolis City Pages says "Pickett's photographs in general are almost a kind of performance art--a ritual act of conjuring up the greater truth that lies in wait like a serpent beneath the surface. Her artistic success comes perhaps from her connection to the interior lives of her subjects, or the absolute strength of her will. In the end, Pickett puts much more of herself into her photos than a viewer is likely to realize."

== Awards and fellowships ==
- McKnight Foundation (Photography Fellowships 1989, 1992, 1997)
- National Endowment of the Arts, Visual Arts (1990)
- The Jerome Foundation (1990)
- Outstanding Young Alumni Award, Moorhead State University (1993)
- Lambda Literary Award for "Best Fine Art Book," for Pickett's book, "Faeries: Visions, Voices & Pretty Dresses (2000)
- Minnesota State Arts Board Initiative Grant for Film (2009)
- Minnesota State Arts Board Initiative Grant for Photography (2012)
- McKnight Fellowships for Media Artists (2017)
- Lifetime Achievement Award from Minnesota State University Moorhead’s School of Art (2018)

== Book Contributions ==
- "Day in the Life of the American Woman" (ISBN 0-82125-706-4)
- "Aperture at 50", Aperture Books (ISBN 1-931788-37-5)
- "Native Universe, Collection of the New Museum of the American Indian", Smithsonian [cover] (ISBN 0792259947)
- "Minnesota 24/7", DK Publishing (ISBN 0-7566-0063-4)
- "At Grandmother's Table, Women Write about Food, Life, the enduring bond between Grandmothers and Granddaughters", Fairview Press (ISBN 1577491076)
- "Minnesota In Our Time, A Photographic Portrait, 12 Photographers Document Minnesota", Minnesota Historical Society Press (ISBN 9780873513838)
- "Hugs and Kisses", Abbeville Press (ISBN 0789203618)
- "Our Grandmother's, Loving Portraits by 74 Granddaughters" (ISBN 0756754208), edited by Linda Sunshine, Welcome Enterprises Inc (ISBN 9780873513838)
- "The Mission, Inside the Church of Jesus Christ of the Latter-Day Saints", Warner Books (ISBN 0446518891).

== Bibliography ==
- 2004 Saving Body & Soul: The Mission of Mary Jo Copeland, Photographs by Keri Pickett with Essays and Interviews by Margaret Nelson, WaterBrook Press/Random House (ISBN 0-87788-194-4)
- 2000 Faeries: Visions, Voices & Pretty Dresses, Aperture Books (ISBN 0-89381-896-8)
- 1995 Love in the 90's. B.B. and Jo, The Story of a Lifelong Love, A Granddaughter's Portrait, Warner Books (ISBN 0-44652-032-2)
