= Marsha Anne Gomez =

Sculptor, potter, activist (1951–1998)

Marsha Anne Gomez (December 24, 1951 – 1998) was a sculptor, art teacher, and activist. She is best known for her series, Madre del mundo (Mother of the World).

== Early life and education ==
Gomez was born in Baton Rouge, Louisiana. Her father, Walter Anthony Gomez Jr., was from the Canary Islands. Her mother, Anna Lula Gomez, was of Cajun and Choctaw descent.

In 1971, Gomez earned an associate degree from Nicholls State College, where she majored in special education and minored in art education. She earned a bachelor's degree in art education from University of Arkansas at Fayetteville in 1981.

== Career ==
Gomez moved to Austin, Texas in 1981 where she worked as a sculptor and teacher. Her work was often themed around her indigenous heritage and social justice.

Gomez co-founded the Indigenous Women's Network and the Foundation for a Compassionate Society. She served as the director of the Alma de Mujer Center for Social Change from its inception until her death. The center, located on Lake Travis outside of Austin, was founded in 1988 by feminist and philanthropist Genevieve Vaughan as a gathering space for women, especially queer women and women of color. Vaughan donated Alma de Mujer to the Indigenous Women's Network in 1996 as part of an effort to restore land to indigenous communities.

As an artist, Gomez worked in pottery, bronze, marble, and cast stone. She was influenced by New Mexican and Oaxacan pottery styles. Her work reflects political and eco-feminist themes, emphasizing indigenous sovereignty, reverence for the Earth, and the role of women in caretaking of natural resources.

== Madre del Mundo ==
Gomez's most well-known work is her sculpture Madre del Mundo (Mother of the World), which depicts a life-sized indigenous woman holding a globe in her lap.

The Foundation for a Compassionate Society and Grandmothers for Peace commissioned the work in 1998 for a Mother's Day protest on Western Shoshone land near a nuclear test site in Nye County, Nevada. Madre del Mundo was intended to represent the maternal and nurturing forces in opposition to the violence of bombing. On a photo of the work, Gomez wrote "save the land, honor treaty rights, stop nuclear testing on our sacred earth." During the protest, the work was seized by the Bureau of Land Management and later returned after a legal dispute.

Gomez replicated the sculpture and placed one copy near Pantex, a weapons plant in Texas. Another copy is located at Casa de Colores in Brownsville, Texas. An additional copy is located at the Temple of the Goddess Spirituality in Indian Springs, Nevada along with a Gomez sculpture of Egyptian goddess Sekhmet.

== Death ==
Gomez was killed by her son, Mekaya, in 1998.
