= Phyllis Young =

A member of Standing Rock in North and South Dakota, Phyllis Young has been an American Indian rights activist (Lakota/Dakota) for more than 40 years. She is most widely known for her leadership role in the anti-Dakota Access Pipeline struggle in 2016 and 2017. Young worked for Standing Rock from October 2015 to September 2017, ultimately as an organizer of the Oceti Sakowin Camp, where tens of thousands of protesters—known as “water protectors”—gathered over time to resist construction of the 1,172 mile long oil pipeline.

Young is a longtime member of the American Indian Movement, and as such she worked for and with Russell Means during his lifetime and other national Native American activists. In 1978 she co-founded Women of All Red Nations with Madonna Thunder Hawk. Between 1993 and 2008 Young served on the board of the National Museum of the American Indian, and in 1977 she helped coordinate the first conference on Indians in the Americas by the United Nations in Geneva, Switzerland.

In 2007, Young was a contributing author of the precursor document that later became the United Nations Declaration on the Rights of Indigenous People. This declaration was later accepted by the General Assembly.

Young was a tribal council member at Standing Rock from 2012 to 2015, and she is currently an organizer for the Lakota People’s Law Project, a nonprofit law firm led by Attorney Daniel Sheehan providing legal defense to water protectors in the aftermath of the Standing Rock DAPL struggle.

In 2018, Young became one of six people to be selected for the 2018 Massachusetts Institute of Technology Solve Fellowship with the Oceti Sakowin. As a Fellow, she was granted $10,000 in funding to put toward her efforts to bring renewable energy to the Standing Rock Reservation.
