= Betty LaDuke =

American artist, writer (born 1933)

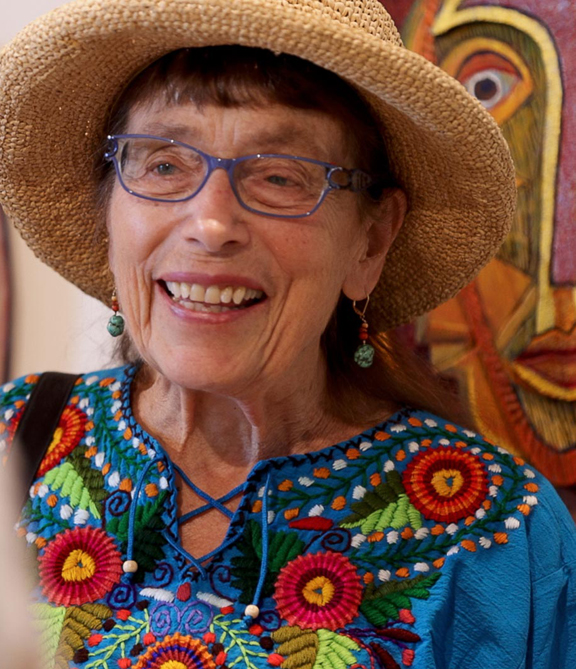
- Education: Cleveland Art Institute, Instituto Allende (San Miguel, Mexico), California State University, Los Angeles
- Occupations: Professor of Art Emeritus, Southern Oregon University
- Known for: Art and activism, global reach, women in art
- Children: Children: Winona LaDuke, Jason Westigard; Grandchildren: Waseyabin Kapashesit, Ajuawak Kapashesit, Gwe Gasco
- Website: https://bettyladuke.com

Betty LaDuke (née Bernstein; born 1933) is an American artist and writer from Ashland, Oregon. For more than 70 years, LaDuke has traversed the globe as an artist and activist, bringing her sketchbook to hundreds of villages in Latin America, Asia, and Africa, and more. Her work — large acrylic paintings, prints, and wood panels — has appeared in museums and public spaces throughout the United States and worldwide.

== Education and teaching ==
Born in 1933 in Bronx, New York, LaDuke attended New York City's High School of Music and Art and continued with scholarships at the University of Denver, the Cleveland Institute of Art, and the Instituto Allende, San Miguel, Mexico (1953-1956). Inspired by mural painters Rivera, Siqueiros, and Tamayo, LaDuke, at the invitation of the Mexican government, painted and exhibited her own murals of indigenous Otomi village schools.

LaDuke's education continued at California State University, Los Angeles where she earned a secondary art teaching credential along with a master's degree in printmaking. She began teaching at Southern Oregon University in 1964 where she was the university's second woman art teacher and for eighteen years the only woman in the Art Department. In an effort to raise the profile of women and international artists, she initiated courses on “Women and Art” and “Art in the Third World,” and her exhibitions highlighted those themes, including Landscape: A Feminine Mythical View at Willamette University in 1977.

During these years, LaDuke also published a series of books documenting the art of non-European women, including Compañeros, Women, Art, and Social Change in Latin America (1985) and Africa: Women's Art, Women's Lives (1991).

She retired from Southern Oregon University as Professor of Art Emeritus in 1996, while continuing to travel internationally, explore new themes, combine activism and art, and exhibit her work extensively. A feature story in the Portland Monthly in 2019 carried the headline: “At 86, Oregon Artist Betty LaDuke Is Unstoppable.

== Artist and activist ==
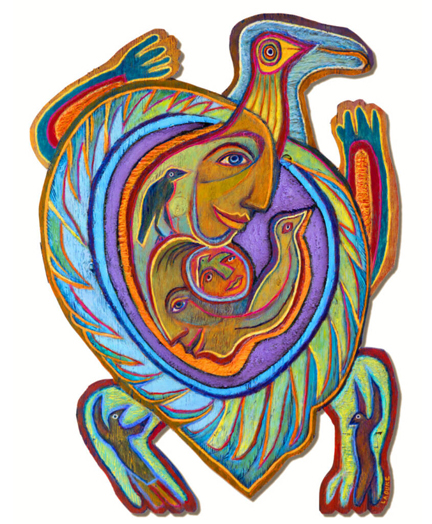
Turtle Water Protector, 2023

LaDuke's annual sketchbook travels, research, and interviews with women artists and, in turn, agro-pastoralists in Asia, Africa, and Latin America began with her first sabbatical to India 1972. In the years that followed, cultural explorations became the basis of her large acrylic paintings and etchings, organized as circulating exhibits displayed in museums, art centers, and public spaces from the Pacific Northwest to Eritrea.

In 2009, for example, the humanitarian organization Heifer International commissioned LaDuke to develop 30 carved, shaped, wood mural panels, Dreaming Cows, for its Arkansas headquarters.

Eight visits to Eritrea (1994 – 2002), interviewing women artists and presenting art workshops, led to a series of paintings, Eritrea Dreaming Peace, of which 21 are now part of Eritrea's cultural heritage.

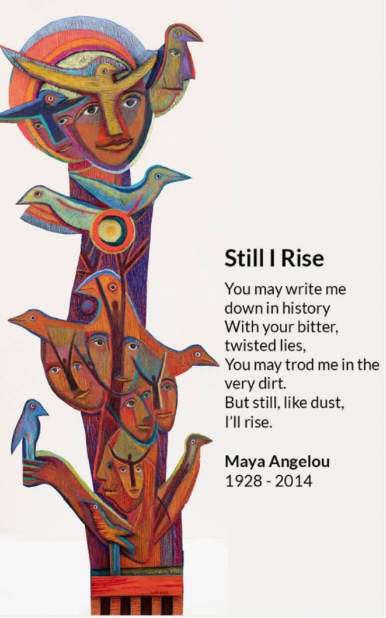
Border Crossings, 2018

In Oregon, Bountiful Harvest, 28 wood panels from a series of 78 celebrating local farms and farmworkers, are permanently installed at Oregon's State Capitol, Rogue Valley International Airport, and at Oregon State University, Southern Oregon University, and Willamette University.

A 2013 exhibit at SOU's Schneider Museum of Art, Celebrating Life: Betty LaDuke Retrospective, gathered 50 years of her paintings, sketches, prints, and wooden panels. In In the same year, Hannon Library at SOU featured a collection of 106 photos, 7 paintings, and 9 drawings of Children of the World, drawn from 46 years of LaDuke's travels to Africa, South America, and Asia.

A 2023 exhibit at Oregon's Grants Pass Museum of Art, Fire, Fury, and Resilience, includes six-foot, carved, wooden totems that speak to the unimaginable hardships and difficult choices of migrants attempting to cross the Southern Border.

Multiple venues — from Turtle Bay Exploration Park in Redding, CA to Oregon State University — showcase LaDuke's newest exhibit, Turtle Wisdom: Personal, Playful, and Political, composed of large, painted wooden panels of “turtles carrying wisdom on their backs.”

For LaDuke, silence was never an option. Believing her work should be accessible to all, LaDuke rarely puts her art up for sale.

== Publications ==
LaDuke's research resulted in five publications including: Compañeras, Women, Art and Social Change in Latin America (1985), Africa: Women's Art, Women's Lives (1989), and Women Artists Multicultural Visions (1990).

More than fifty books and articles document and review LaDuke's art including Multi-Cultural Celebrations, the Paintings of Betty LaDuke 1972 – 1992 (Pomengranate, 1993) and “Silence Is Not An Option: The Arts and Activism of Betty LaDuke” (Calyx Press, 2024).

LaDuke has also created a series of sketchbooks for children, drawn from her own drawings of children around the world and of farm workers in Southern Oregon.

== Recognition ==
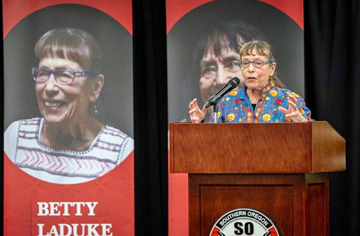
SOU President's Award, Jan. '24 (Photo: Bob Palmerini, Ashland News)

In 1993, La Duke received the Oregon Governor's Award in the Arts. In 1996, she received the National Art Education Association's Ziegfeld Award for Distinguished International Leadership and the Oregon Medallion Award in 2019. In 2024, LaDuke received Southern Oregon University President's Medal.

"The myth, magic, and reality of people and places, Betty LaDuke has met and visited flow through her paintbrush into images that tell of war, survival, border crossings, rites of passage and the common humanity among cultures.” – Lee Husk, Eminent Women, 1859 Oregon's Magazine, 2015

“LaDuke is an artist who has never worked according to the demand of current fashion, but instead a unique and deeply personal course. Her art resonates with humanity and social responsibility that is simultaneously intimate and politically engaged with issues of the day.” – Bruce Guenther, Art Historian and Independent Curator

In 2001, UN Secretary-General Kofi Anon wrote LaDuke: “We were delighted to learn that the original painting Eritrea – Ethiopia Grandmother's Dreaming Peace has been donated to UNIFEM . . . and we hope that you will be able to continue to create your unique images with their timeless perspective.”

Johnnetta B. Cole, Director of the Smithsonian National Museum of African Art, told LaDuke in 2017: “You will always have a special place in my heart, and I will continue to admire your artistry and respect your activism in the interest of peace with justice.", 1859

Meanwhile, LaDuke has been featured in over 30 videos, including “Betty LaDuke reflects on 8 decades of activist art,” Oregon Art Beat, 2021.

The Hallie Ford Museum of Art and Mark O. Hatfield Library at Willamette University, Salem, Oregon holds archives and special collections of LaDuke's work.

== Personal life ==
In 1956, when Betty LaDuke returned to the United States from the Instituto Allende in Mexico, she met and married White Nation actor and author Sun Bear (Vincent LaDuke) and gave birth to activist and community organizer Winona LaDuke. When she and Sun Bear divorced in 1964, LaDuke and daughter Winona moved from Los Angeles to Ashland, Oregon, where LaDuke joined the Art Department at Southern Oregon University.

A year later, she married Oregon State University Entomologist, Peter Hughes Westigard (1933–2011). Their son, Jason Westigard, was born in 1970.

In June, 2025 Winona LaDuke wrote a tribute to her mother's life and work for the Minnesota Women's Press: “My mother's work is symbolic and mythical. So is life, and community organizing. As I enjoy my mother's company and art, as an elder myself, I see a reaffirmation of the beauty of life, of humans, and of the potential forever to repaint and create anew.”
