= Esther Miriam Fieldman =

American businesswoman and politician

Esther Miriam Fieldman (née Fox) (September 14, 1915 – June 29, 2007) was an American businesswoman and politician.

Born in Brooklyn, New York City, New York, Fieldman went to the New York City public schools. She owned Fieldman's Surplus Store in Park Rapids, Minnesota, with her husband Max. Fieldman was elected to the Park Rapids School Board in 1954, and in 1958, became the first female president of the school board. In 1961 and 1962, Fieldman served in the Minnesota House of Representatives and was a member of the Democratic-Farmer-Labor (DFL) party; she served on the Education and Game and Fish committees. In 2000, she was awarded the DFL Women of Distinction Award, and in 2007, she received the Hubert H. Humphrey Award from the DFL. Fieldman died in Minneapolis, Minnesota, and she is buried at Fort Snelling National Cemetery.
