= Janet McCloud =

Native American activist

Janet McCloud, also known as Yet-Si-Blue, (March 30, 1934 – November 25, 2003) was a prominent Native American and indigenous rights activist. Her activism helped lead to the 1974 Boldt Decision, which earned her the title of "The Rosa Parks of the American Indian Movement." She co-founded Women of All Red Nations (WARN) in 1974. In August 1985, the first gathering of the Indigenous Women's Network took place in her backyard in Yelm, Washington.

== Ancestry and early life ==
Janet Renecker (Yet-Si-Blue) was born on the Tulalip Reservation. She was the oldest of three girls and a descendant of Chief Seattle's family. Her childhood was marked by poverty and her stepfather drank which led to him having trouble finding work.

"She thought taverns and drinking was the only way in life," her daughter, Barbara McCloud, states.

Throughout her early years, she and her family moved often. She lived in Tulalip, Taholah, on the Quinault Reservation, and in Seattle's International District. She often took refuge in churches and foster homes, spending much of her formative years in the city—mainly out of touch with tribal customs and traditions.

She married and divorced young before meeting a Nisqually tribal fisherman and electrical lineman named Don McCloud in the early 1950s. The couple soon married, and together would have eight children: six girls and two boys.

== Fishing rights activism ==
On January 6, 1962, dozens of Washington State game wardens stormed a group of Native Americans fishing the Nisqually River. This resulted in the detainment of five men for illegal fishing. This is important to note as those who were arrested included some of McCloud's relatives. Despite tribal treaties, such as the Treaty of Medicine Creek of 1854, with the federal government that guaranteed fishing and hunting rights to Indians in their traditional tribal lands and waters, state agents periodically squared off with Native Americans.

"When the raid ended after more than eight hours of sorties in wet brush and on the muddy, swollen stream, five Indians had been arrested and charged with `operating set nets capable of taking game fish.'"

As salmon and steelhead numbers began dwindling in the 1960s, the state began exerting more authority over tribal fisheries, attempting to conserve the catch for the commercial and sport fishing industries. Injunctions were issued allowing the state to regulate tribal fisheries, and the Washington State Supreme Court upheld them. Native Americans began mobilizing. The McCloud's founded the activist group Survival of American Indians Association. In defiance of court orders, members began staging demonstrations dubbed "fish-ins", the beginning of what would come to be known as the Fish Wars.

Joining her husband, Janet McCloud helped organize the protests at the Nisqually River and Puyallup River. Here tribe members would cast traditional nets deemed illegal by the state. Invariably, the "fish-ins" would lead to raids and arrests at the hands of game agents. However, the events drew worldwide attention. Indian elders and activists converged on Washington State. Actor Marlon Brando and rights activist Dick Gregory went to Western Washington, joined fish-ins and lent their celebrity to the cause. The Black Panthers stood side-by-side with Native Americans in protests at the state Capitol in Olympia.

All the while, Janet McCloud documented the struggle as editor of Survival News, a newsletter that presented the natives' side of the fish wars. She found an old mimeograph machine at a local thrift store, brought it home and recruited her children to help. Janet's children stood on the battle lines. During one famous on October 13, 1965, a boat carrying several native fishermen, including Janet's husband and two sons, set a tribal net in the river as game wardens lay in waiting. Her son, Jeff McCloud, not yet 10 and a non-swimmer, was dumped in. A scuffle broke out on the shore, where native women and children had gathered peacefully to watch the demonstration. They pelted wardens with debris, while game agents wrestled and beat some of the protesters. Six people were arrested, including Don and Janet McCloud. She served six days and refused to eat while incarcerated. Eventually, the Native American's efforts paid off. On February 12, 1974, U.S. District Judge George Boldt ruled in favor of 14 treaty tribes, upholding the language of their treaties that entitled them to half the salmon and steelhead catch in Washington.

== Resurrecting Native American spirituality ==
While McCloud was a practicing Catholic, the Fish Wars, along her status as a civil rights leader catapulted her to become more in touch with her native spirituality. While her husband was jailed for a fish-in, McCloud experienced a vision at her Yelm home. "She couldn't rely on the white man's religion; it was hurting her," Joyce McCloud, her daughter-in-law, recalled. "That's when she saw the vision: She was looking out at Mount Rainier, and she saw all the faces of the Great Chiefs." McCloud believed it to be a calling. In the late 1960s, Janet met with Thomas Banyacya, an internationally known Hopi spiritual interpreter, who taught her to search for answers in peace. McCloud befriended Audrey Shenandoah, an Iroquois Indian and Clan Mother of the Onondaga Nation in New York, and adopted Iroquois religious beliefs on nature. "She was always speaking her mind, not backing down for anything," said Tracy Shenandoah, who with his mother came to Yelm to be with McCloud.

During the 1970s, McCloud spread the message of native spirituality and human rights worldwide. She traveled the globe, speaking about indigenous women's rights and social justice. Throughout her fight for women's rights to autonomy she came head to head with white feminist leading the same charge. However, the two sides met at a culture barrier when native women were being used in a eugenics experiment during a birth control movement. The birth control movement did have negative impacts on minority groups due to racist and misunderstanding of culture views of biological roles amongst the native culture. McCloud's social justice work also led her to serve as a delegate to a national conference on corrections, urging prisons to adopt native spirituality traditions for Indian inmates.

== Sapa Dawn Center ==
Janet McCloud established her home as well as the surrounding 10 acres in Yelm, Washington. She gave this area the name Sapa Dawn Center. The word "Sapa" means grandfather, which paid homage to her husband, Don McCloud, who died in April 1985.

"The elders have said this is a spiritual place. For over 30 years, we've used this land to teach our traditional ways. When all is going crazy . . . our people can come back to the center to find the calming effect; to reconnect with their spiritual self," McCloud, an Indian elder herself, wrote in 1999.

In August 1985, 300 Indigenous women gathered at Sapa Dawn to discuss social and economic issues faced by native families throughout the Western Hemisphere. This led to the formation of the Indigenous Women's Network, a coalition championing native women, families, and tribal sovereignty from Chile to Canada. McCloud was adopted as a founding mother. She ensured that Sapa Dawn would bring its visitors closer to traditional ways of life.

"There was no motel in Yelm then. So we put up tepees. One woman said: 'Where's the motel?' I said, 'Here's a key: tepee number one or tepee number two,'" recalls McCloud.

Leaders of the American Indian Movement, such as Dennis Banks and Russell Means, came to Sapa Dawn, as well as its sweat lodge, before launching their 1973 at Wounded Knee Occupation in South Dakota. In this operation, nearly 200 activist in the American Indian Movement (AIM) took occupation of the Wounded Knee village for 71 days. These activist were protesting the Tribal Chairman, Richard Wilson, as he was corrupt. On May 8, 1973, the group surrendered as the United States government took control of the town.

== Yet-Si-Blue ==
One important part of Indigenous culture is the naming process of a person. The name given to a Native American individual is based upon their personality as well as significant life changes and milestones. In addition, a child's name can be changed if it no longer fit the essence of the child. Oftentimes, new names are given to signify new life stages and development in children. In addition, names can also be bestowed when an individual perform an honorable accomplishment. McCloud's grandmother gave her the name, "Yet-Si-Blue," which means "the woman who talks."

"She had become a spokeswoman for Indian culture. That was the perfect name," Pete Henry, her uncle, remarked.

== Death ==
McCloud was immobilized by complications from diabetes, which resulted in high blood pressure, in her final weeks. She died on November 25, 2003, at the age of 69. She was dressed in traditional garb by her granddaughters and covered in a handmade quilt. Her family gathered together in her final days.
