= Heartland State Trail =

Rail trail in Minnesota, U.S.

Coordinates: 47°9′7.84″N 94°38′24.92″W

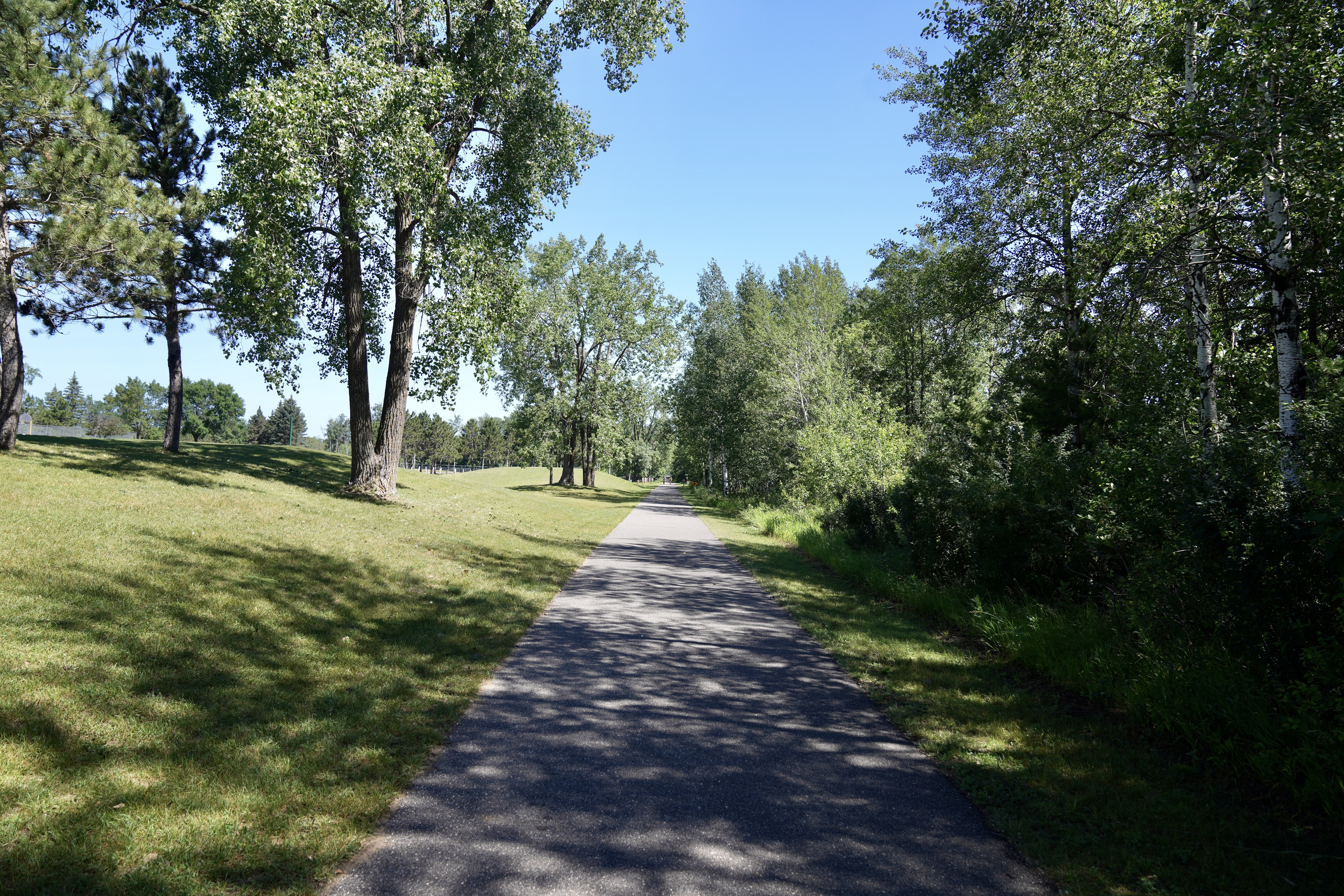
- The Heartland State Trail leaving Park Rapids, Minnesota
- Length: 49 mi (79 km)
- Location: North-central Minnesota, United States
- Designation: Minnesota state trail, National Recreation Trail
- Trailheads: Park Rapids; Cass Lake
- Use: Biking, hiking, horseback riding, in-line skating, mountain biking, snowmobiling
- Grade: Mostly level
- Season: Year-round
- Sights: Chippewa National Forest, Leech Lake
- Hazards: Severe weather
- Surface: Asphalt, natural surface
- Website: Heartland State Trail

The Heartland State Trail is a multi-use recreational rail trail in north-central Minnesota, United States. The main trail runs 49 miles (79 km) between Park Rapids and Cass Lake, intersecting with the Paul Bunyan State Trail around Walker. Both the Park Rapids to Walker and Walker to Cass Lake segments are paved; the Park Rapids to Walker segment also has a parallel natural-surface trail for horseback riding, hiking and mountain biking. A 4-mile (6.4 km) segment north of Walker has sharply rolling terrain for snowmobiles; DNR maps show a marked alternate route on paved road shoulders for bicyclists.

Authorized by the Minnesota Legislature in 1974, the Heartland State Trail is one of Minnesota's oldest rail trails. It was designated a National Recreation Trail on July 2, 1991. The Park Rapids to Moorhead extension was authorized in 2006; the 2011 master plan described it as approximately 85 to 100 miles (137 to 161 km), depending on the selected route. The proposed expansion would originate at Moorhead, extend through Detroit Lakes to Park Rapids, and continue through Walker to Cass Lake, and include a segment connecting the trail to Itasca State Park. DNR materials identify an additional paved Heartland Trail Extension from Detroit Lakes toward Frazee.

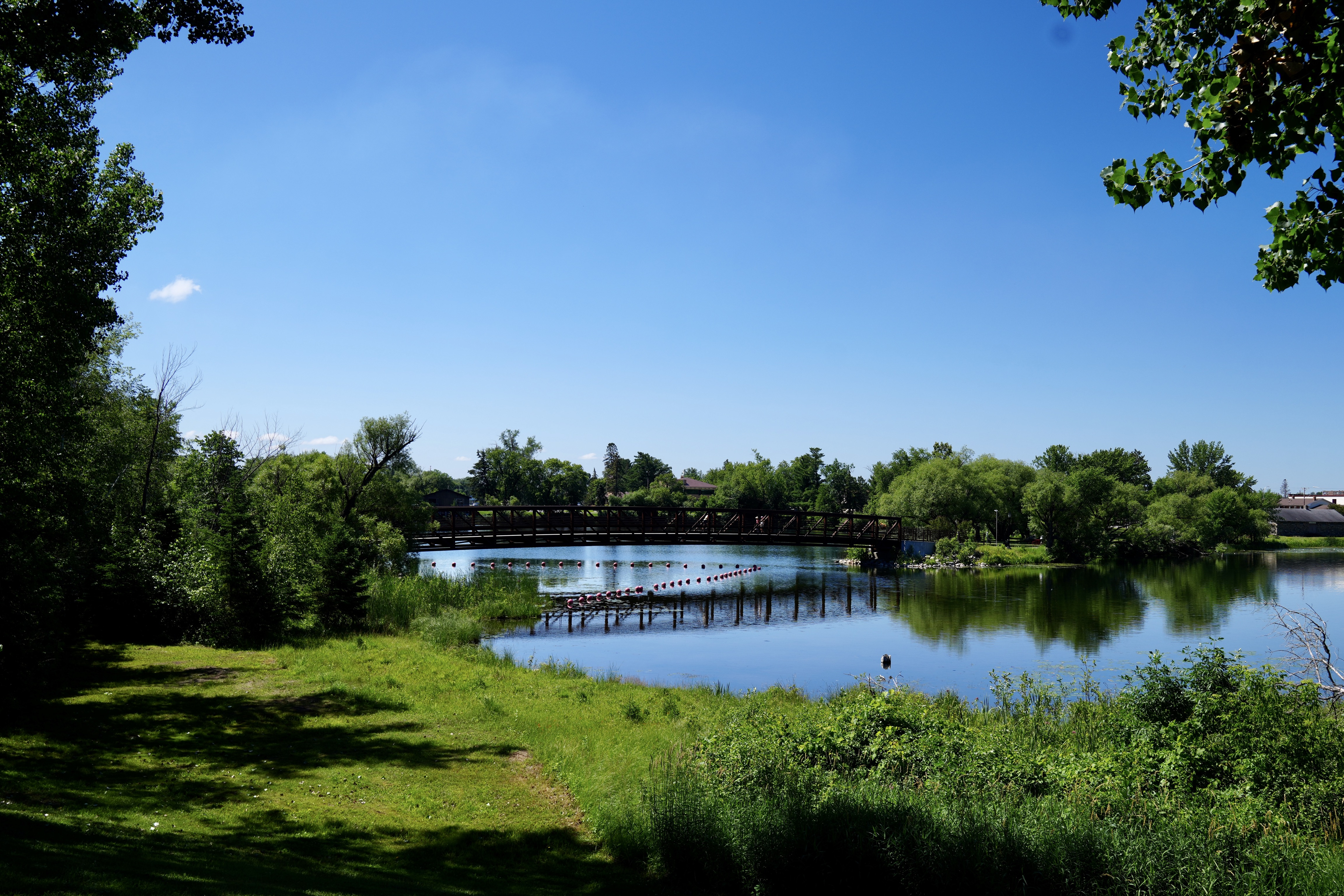
Trailhead in Park Rapids.

The main route passes through Dorset, Nevis, Akeley, and Walker between Park Rapids and Cass Lake.
