= Indigenous Women's Network =

Nonprofit support organisation

The Indigenous Women's Network (IWN) is a nonprofit organization that provides a platform for Indigenous women in the Western Hemisphere. The organization was founded in 1985. IWN focuses on Native women, their families and communities and attempts to help them have sovereignty over themselves and their environment. IWN has published a journal, Indigenous Women, since 1991. This magazine is the first and currently the only magazine written by and for Native women.

== History ==
Winona LaDuke and Janet McCloud were some of the co-founders of IWN. Nearly 200 Native women activists created the IWN at a gathering hosted by the Northwest Indian Women's Circle in Yelm, Washington, in 1985. LaDuke and McCloud felt that sexism which was present in the Native activist movements of the 1980s. This led to the creation of IWN. IWN also shared members with Women of All Red Nations. Over the past 21 years, IWN has evolved into an international coalition of Indigenous women from rural and urban communities who approach the resolution of contemporary challenges from a traditional Indigenous values base.
