= John A. Ainley Jr. =

American politician and newspaperman

John Albert Ainley Jr.
- Born: July 24, 1938; Park Rapids, Minnesota, U.S.
- Died: May 3, 2001 (aged 62); Saint Paul, Minnesota, U.S.
- Education: Bemidji State University
- Occupations: Newspaperman, politician
- Political party: Republican

John Albert Ainley Jr. (July 24, 1938 – May 3, 2001) was an American newspaperman and politician.

From Park Rapids, Minnesota, Ainley served in the United States Army and received his bachelor's degree from Bemidji State University in mass communications. He owned the Park Rapids Enterprise and then the Park Rapids Advertiser. He served in the Minnesota House of Representatives from 1979 to 1983 as a Republican. He died in Saint Paul, Minnesota.
