= Timothy McDarrah =

American magazine editor (1962–2021)

- Born: Timothy Swann McDarrah; 1962
- Died: 16 August 2021 (aged 59); New York City
- Occupations: Journalist, author, tour guide, gallery owner
- Parent: Fred McDarrah (father) Gloria Swann McDarrah (mother)

Timothy Swann McDarrah (March, 29, 1962 – August 16, 2021) was a newspaper reporter and editor, gossip columnist and art gallery owner from New York City, whose life mirrored the New York tabloid stories he covered.

== Career ==
McDarrah had a distinguished career as an award-winning journalist, preservationist and gallerist. After graduating from the prestigious Stuyvesant High School and later Columbia University's Graduate School of Journalism, he joined the New York Post as a reporter, and then an editor of the Post's famous "Page Six" gossip column. He built a reputation as a brash, magnetic and only-in-New-York persona with his reporting and writing style—for eight years taking on Post stunt pieces such as posing as a squeegee man on the Bowery, tracking down then-Mets pitcher Dwight Gooden’s drug dealers, and was embedded in Rev. Al Sharpton’s 1992 trip to Haiti. McDarrah was the award-winning byline behind a 1989 front page exposing cheating on state-wide high school exams: The Post published the answers to the New York State chemistry Regent’s Exam the morning of the test, forcing a cancellation for 80,000 high school students and costing the state $250,000 to re-do. He later oversaw community weeklies at News Communications and contributed to CourtTV.com. He served as managing editor of The Sporting News, worked as a gossip columnist at the Las Vegas Sun, and then returned to New York to work as a columnist at US Weekly. When Guardian Angels founder and 2021 New York City mayoral candidate Curtis Sliwa was shot in 1992, McDarrah filled in as co-host of his radio show, WABC’s Angels in the Morning. He was a regular guest on The Morton Downey Jr. Show in the late 1980s, and had weekly appearances on Nevada Public Radio in the early 2000s.

== Arrest and conviction ==
McDarrah was arrested in New York in June 2005 in an FBI sting operation on charges related to online solicitation of sex with a minor, and after an eight-day trial, was sentenced to six years in a minimum security prison. His attorney blamed his client's conduct on an internet addiction.

== Later career ==
McDarrah co-authored three books with his father, Fred McDarrah, a longtime staff photographer for The Village Voice. The books are Kerouac and Friends: A Beat Generation Album, Gay Pride: Photographs from Stonewall to Today, and Anarchy, Protest & Rebellion.

In 2016, he began the Save the Village walking tours of key places in Greenwich Village's social history, organizing the tours around photos from his father's photograph archives of Greenwich Village.

He edited a retrospective book of his father's photographs entitled Fred W. McDarrah: New York Scenes, released by Abrams Books in 2019.

McDarrah’ s last act was to start his own downtown gallery, Art of Our Century, in 2019. “I can’t do it [create art.] But maybe my art is being of service to those that can. And to those who are interested in what an artist can do,” he wrote in a blog post on the gallery's website. The gallery helped to boost the careers of painters Khari Turner and Marc Kehoe, fiber artist Dindga McCannon, and street artist Hash Halper, who died by suicide in June, among others.

McDarrah died on August 16, 2021, when a fast-moving acute leukemia took his life when he was 59. McDarrah is survived by a son, Theodore Howard McDarrah, with photographer and journalist Caroline Howard.
