= Giiwedinong Treaty Rights and Culture Museum =

Museum in Park Rapids, Minnesota

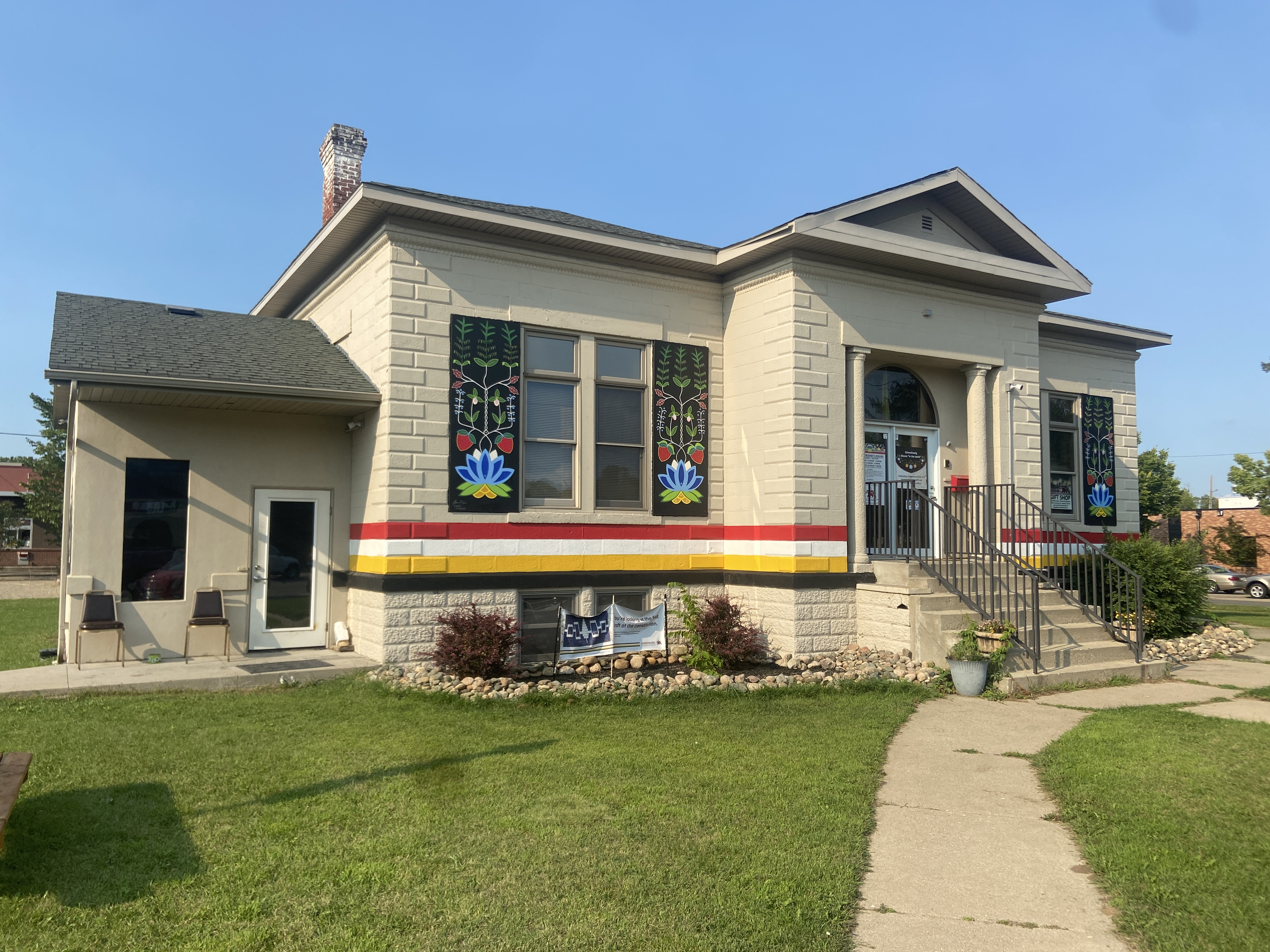
- Exterior of museum
- Established: 2023
- Location: 101 2nd Street W, Park Rapids, Minnesota 56470
- Coordinates: 46.921389°N 95.058889°W
- Type: History
- Executive director: Logan Monroe
- Website: giiwedinong.org

The Giiwedinong Treaty Rights and Culture Museum in Park Rapids, Minnesota, was established in 2023 as the first museum in the state managed by Indigenous peoples, focusing on treaty rights, environmental justice, and cultural heritage.

== Mission ==
The museum, named after the Anishinaabe word for "in the north," aims to present and preserve the history and culture of the Anishinaabe and Dakota peoples. It provides educational exhibits and programs designed to inform the public about the significance of treaty rights and the ongoing efforts for environmental justice.

== Collections and programs ==
The museum features works from Anishinaabe artists and serves as a venue for storytelling, aiming to represent a range of voices and artistic expressions. It addresses topics at the intersection of Indigenous rights, environmental stewardship, and policy implications.

== Leadership ==
A team of Indigenous historians, artists, and community leaders guide the museum, ensuring that it accurately reflects Anishinaabe perspectives. The museum partners with various cultural organizations to extend its educational outreach.

== Exhibits ==
Exhibits at the museum cover historical treaties, cultural traditions, and current issues affecting Indigenous communities, with the goal of educating visitors on the Anishinaabe worldview and the relevance of treaty rights.

== Educational outreach ==
Giiwedinong conducts educational initiatives for diverse audiences, facilitating engagement with Anishinaabe history, culture, and arts through structured programs and community involvement.

== Facility ==
The museum is housed in a building originally funded by Andrew Carnegie in 1908, which served as the Park Rapids library for decades. After the library relocated for accessibility reasons, the building was repurposed for various uses, including a regional office for Enbridge. In 2022, the organization Akiing acquired the building to establish the museum, focusing on the representation of Anishinaabe culture and treaty rights.

== See also ==
- List of museums in Minnesota
