= Tom LaDuke =

American painter and sculptor (born 1964)

Tom LaDuke (born 1964) is an American painter and sculptor whose work explores themes of nature, science fiction, and memory, and utilizes a wide range of image depiction and surface techniques.

== Early life and education ==
LaDuke was born in Holyoke, Massachusetts. He grew up in Los Angeles, California, where he continues to live and work today. In 1991, he earned his Bachelor of Fine Arts from California State University, Fullerton. Three years later in 1994, he completed his Master of Fine Arts at The School of the Art Institute of Chicago, Illinois.

== Works ==
LaDuke's paintings are often multi-layered surfaces that employ both precise image-rendering as well as odd gestural marks and sculptural accumulations of paint. The subject matter of his work is varied, including deceptions of nature alongside science-fiction elements and abstract mark-making. He is primarily a painter, but he occasionally exhibits sculptures which explore similar themes of the body, nature, and artificiality.

== Exhibitions ==
He has exhibited his work regularly since 2001, in solo shows at the Angeles Gallery in Santa Monica, the CRG gallery in New York and most recently at the Kohn Gallery in Los Angeles. In 2010, his traveling exhibition, "Run Generator", was shown at the Pennsylvania Academy of the Fine Arts, Philadelphia and traveled to the Weatherspoon Museum in Greensboro, North Carolina.
