= Women of All Red Nations =

Native American women's organization

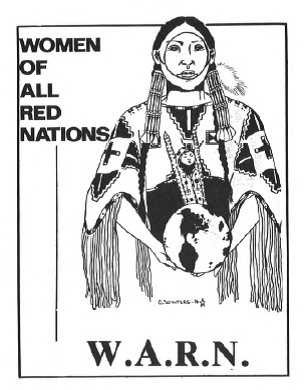
WARN logo

Women of All Red Nations (WARN) was a Native American women's organization that fought for Native American civil and reproductive rights. It was established in 1974 by Lorelei DeCora Means, Madonna Thunderhawk, Phyllis Young, Janet McCloud, Marie Sanchez and others. WARN included more than 300 women from 30 different tribal communities. Many of its members had previously been active in the American Indian Movement and were participants in the 1973 Wounded Knee incident. The inaugural conference took place in Rapid City, South Dakota.

Women of All Red Nations (WARN) championed the health of Native American women, the restoration and security of treaty rights, the elimination of Indian mascots in sports, and the protest against the commercialization of Native American culture. Additionally, WARN emphasized the high rate of health issues like birth defects, miscarriages, and deaths on Native American land from nuclear mining and storage. WARN also expressed concerns about the forced sterilization of Indigenous women and the adoption of Indigenous children by non-Natives. In their annual newsletter, WARN published “The Theft of Life” to draw attention to the ongoing forced sterilization of Indigenous women. In 1979, the article was reprinted for the National Indian Civil Rights Issues Hearing, which was held in Washington D.C. as part of the United States Commission on Civil Rights.

A 1974 WARN study reported that, during the 1970s, 40–50% of interviewed Indigenous women believed they had been sterilized, although a subsequent study indicated this estimate was too high. Estimating the prevalence of sterilization is difficult, as the population did undergo growth during this period, while many of those who underwent the procedure already had three or four children. As a result of the efforts of WARN to bring attention to these practices, in 1979 regulations governing sterilization were issued by the United States Department of Health and Human Services. In 1980, WARN issued a report indicating a statistical correlation between the high levels of pollution on Pine Ridge Reservation and an increased incidence of birth defects, abortions and cancer. This region had been used for uranium mining, served as a military gunnery range and had been subjected to herbicide and insecticide contamination from off-reservation farms.

== History of the group ==
Information varies on whether WARN was founded in 1974 in Rapid City, South Dakota, or founded in 1978 in San Francisco, California. Prior to forming their own organization, some of the women who founded WARN were activists working within the American Indian Movement (AIM) and were active in the Wounded Knee Insurrection of 1973. Madonna Thunderhawk and Lorelei DeCora Means were both part of the Pie Patrol in AIM during the occupation of Wounded Knee. Two other co-founders, Janet McCloud and Phyllis Young, had also taken part in other Red Power movement activism. Almost 200 women from more than 30 different tribes went to WARN's founding conference.

The group was formed as a result both of mounting frustration with a lack of visibility, and because of the persecution of the male leaders of AIM by the FBI. The federal government made arrests of many of the male activists but did not arrest the female activists. The prolonged incarceration or trials for male leaders necessitated women to fill in leadership roles. The women formed WARN in response to this lack of attention towards them and to continue to campaign for Indigenous rights. The formation of WARN also provided Indigenous women with the opportunity to focus on issues that affected them as women specifically.

== Rapid City Conference (1974) ==
Due to issues in AIM, Madonna Thunderhawk, Janet McCloud, and Lorelei DeCora called for a women's meeting. This conference was held in Rapid City, South Dakota. Over 300 women from different tribes attended to discuss concerns about women's rights within indigenous communities. Attendees were both former AIM activists and new activists. AIM had not attended to the concerns of these women, so the conference was held to come up with an alternate solution. This solution was WARN - Women of All Red Nations. WARN was founded by the women at the Rapid City conference to attend to issues involving indigenous women's health and safety. Other concerns that they had were ending domestic abuse, ending involuntary sterilization of Native women, and fighting substance abuse in tribal communities.

The Rapid City Conference hosted a variety of attendees, ranging from 30 different tribal communities, AIM veterans, and new activists. Due to FBI determination to eradicate AIM during the 1970s, the leaders of AIM were jailed, killed, or forced into hiding. WARN made an effort to extend the work AIM did as a movement that supported the rights of Native peoples. However, the group's focus shifted to women. Women were appointed leadership positions, and the struggles of Indigenous women were the main focus of the group's activism.

== Uranium mining ==
WARN was fundamental in stopping the uranium mining that was going to occur on the sacred Black Hills of South Dakota. They created coalitions in order to stop the mining on lands that are sacred to the Lakota, Nakota, and Dakota people.

In 1980 WARN conducted and published a study on the effects of radiation contamination in water from uranium mining on human reproductive health titled "Radiation: Dangerous to Pine Ridge Women" in the journal Akwesane News. J. Haworth Jonte was the biochemist that measured radiation levels within the Pine Ridge Indian Reservation water sources. The federal guidelines indicated that any measurement over 5 picocuries of radiation per liter of water was a severe health hazard. The surface water measurement was 15 picocuries per liter. The reservation's aquifer had a measurement of 11 picocuries per liter, meaning that the groundwater system was highly radioactive.

A new well was proposed to solve water contamination issue. The study also tested water at the site of the new well and found that water to be fourteen times higher than the federal guidelines.

WARN conducted a community survey in the Pine Ridge Indian Reservation in South Dakota, close to the border of Nebraska. The survey found an abnormally high rate of miscarriages, leukemia, and cancer mortality in the population of the reservation and surrounding areas. Other adverse health effects were also found in the area: 60 to 70 percent of children who were born in the Pine Ridge Hospital suffered respiratory problems as a result of underdeveloped lungs or jaundice. Thirty-eight percent of pregnant women admitted to the Public Service Hospital had miscarriages and many of these women experienced excessive bleeding after miscarrying. Cattle living on the reservation also saw an increase in birth defects. These negative health effects were linked to the effects of radiation from uranium mining. The radiation from mining in the Black Hills in South Dakota and Edgemont contaminated the Cheyenne River, a source for the Lakota Aquifer. WARN called for a complete Congressional investigation of the health and water situation in the Pine Ridge Reservation.

== Sterilization of Native American women ==
WARN linked the issue of coerced sterilization to a continuing attack on the Indigenous population in order to acquire their land for resources such as uranium.

Connie Pinkerton-Uri, a physician of Choctaw and Cherokee heritage, carried out a survey in 1974 of Native American women. Pinkerton-Uri’s goal was to collect data on rates of sterilization among Native American women of various tribal backgrounds. Her findings were published by the University of Nebraska Press. This study found that many of the Native American women who had been sterilized underwent the procedure without their informed consent.

Many of the women did not understand what they were agreeing to, or were coerced or threatened into agreement, or were not in the proper mental state to give consent when asked to sign sterilization forms by medical professionals. Some of the women interviewed were asked about sterilization during labor, or while under the influence of pain relieving drugs. Other women were presented with sterilization paperwork in English that they could not read. Still others were told that if they did not sign the sterilization forms that they would lose government benefits that they depended on or that their children would be taken from them. In some cases the women were falsely told the procedure could be reversed at a later time if they wanted to have children.

Pinkerton-Uri stated that many of the doctors performing the sterilizations believed that if Native Americans could not have children or had fewer children that they would become less financially impoverished. In her research Pinkerton-Uri found that twenty-five percent of full-blooded Native American women had been sterilized.

In 1970, the Family Planning Services and Population Research Act led to the forced sterilization of 25% of Native American women during the six-year period that it was enacted. Many of these procedures happened without the women’s consent, and sometimes without their knowledge. Marie Sanchez—the chief tribal judge of the Northern Cheyenne Reservation—explains that the causes of this go much deeper than bodily autonomy: the problem stems from colonialism itself. Not only were Native women’s reproductive rights restricted with forced sterilization, but they also had limited access to other reproductive care like safe abortions. These problems were expedited by a disproportionately worse health care system on reservations. As a group, WARN advocated for women's reproductive rights and against the forced sterilization of Native women.

In 1976 the U.S. General Accounting Office found that from 1973 to 1976, 3,406 Native American women underwent coerced sterilization procedures in just four of the twelve IHS service areas. Out of these 3,406 women, 36 of them were under the age of 21. These 36 young women were sterilized in direct violation of a court order stating that minimum age for sterilization procedures to be 21. The total number of coerced sterilizations during this period across all twelve IHS service areas was estimated to be roughly 3,000 per year.

Adding to the problems of sterilization of women of color are aspects of victim blaming. According to a 1979 meeting in Akwesasne, this victim blaming takes the form of tribes with high levels of sterilization being viewed as incompetent of defending their inhabitants, by tribes that have not experienced high levels of sterilization.

== Protests and political action ==
WARN was and is an active participant in national conferences and regularly works with other women’s organizations. It is a member of the National Organization for Women, which aims to promote policies to improve minority women's causes. The main political actions taken by WARN are educational improvements and opportunities, healthcare, and reproductive rights for Native American women. It also aims to end violence against women, as well as stop the exploitation of Native Americans through pop culture, like the use of American Indians in sports mascots. As well as all of these WARN advocates for the protection of tribal land and treaties.

To protest the issues that WARN was advocating against, political action was taken and protests were held. In 1978, Janet McCloud led a march between numerous sites, located from the West Coast all the way to Washington D.C. The march was 3,000 miles. At the end of the march, a protest was held in Washington D.C. The protest was opposing proposed new bills that would constrict Indigenous Peoples' treaty rights, as well as bills that would violate fishing, hunting, land, and water rights held by the Native population. Over 30,000 people rallied in the capital to oppose these bills. Soon after the rally, McCloud traveled to Seattle and destroyed copies of the bills in front of the Seattle representative's office. While many other protests and rallies happened around this time, this is the only one directly associated with WARN.

They also participated in the Keystone XL (KXL) pipeline protest in 2020. The protest against pipeline construction near reservation lands would threaten water and climate. The pipeline was to cross at least five aquifers used by Native American communities, as well as carry barrels of oil across these lands. Along with the climate threats, WARN protests for the safety of Native American women and girls.

== See also ==
- Eugenics in the United States
