= Park Rapids, Minnesota =

City in Minnesota, United States

Park Rapids
- City
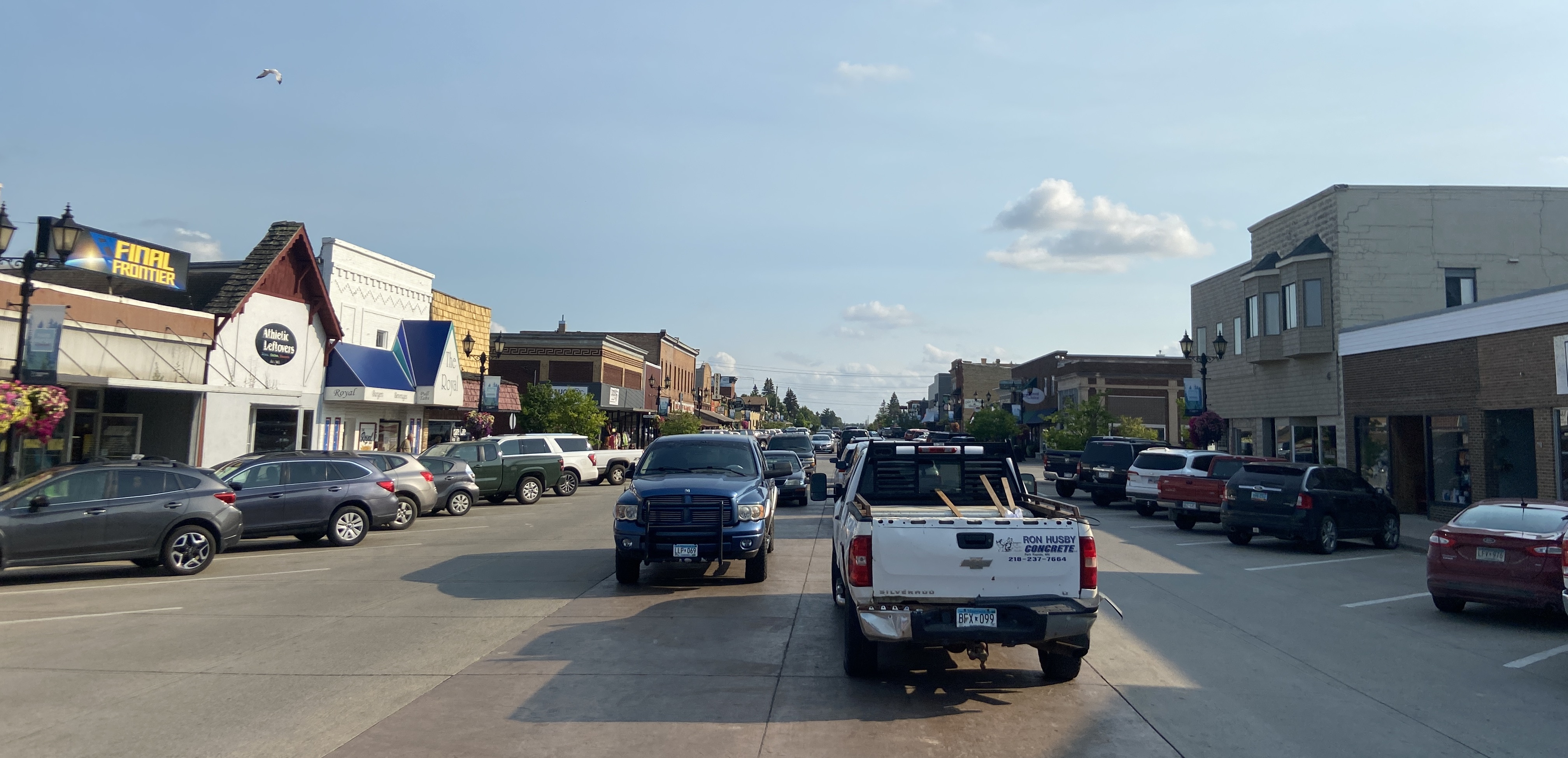
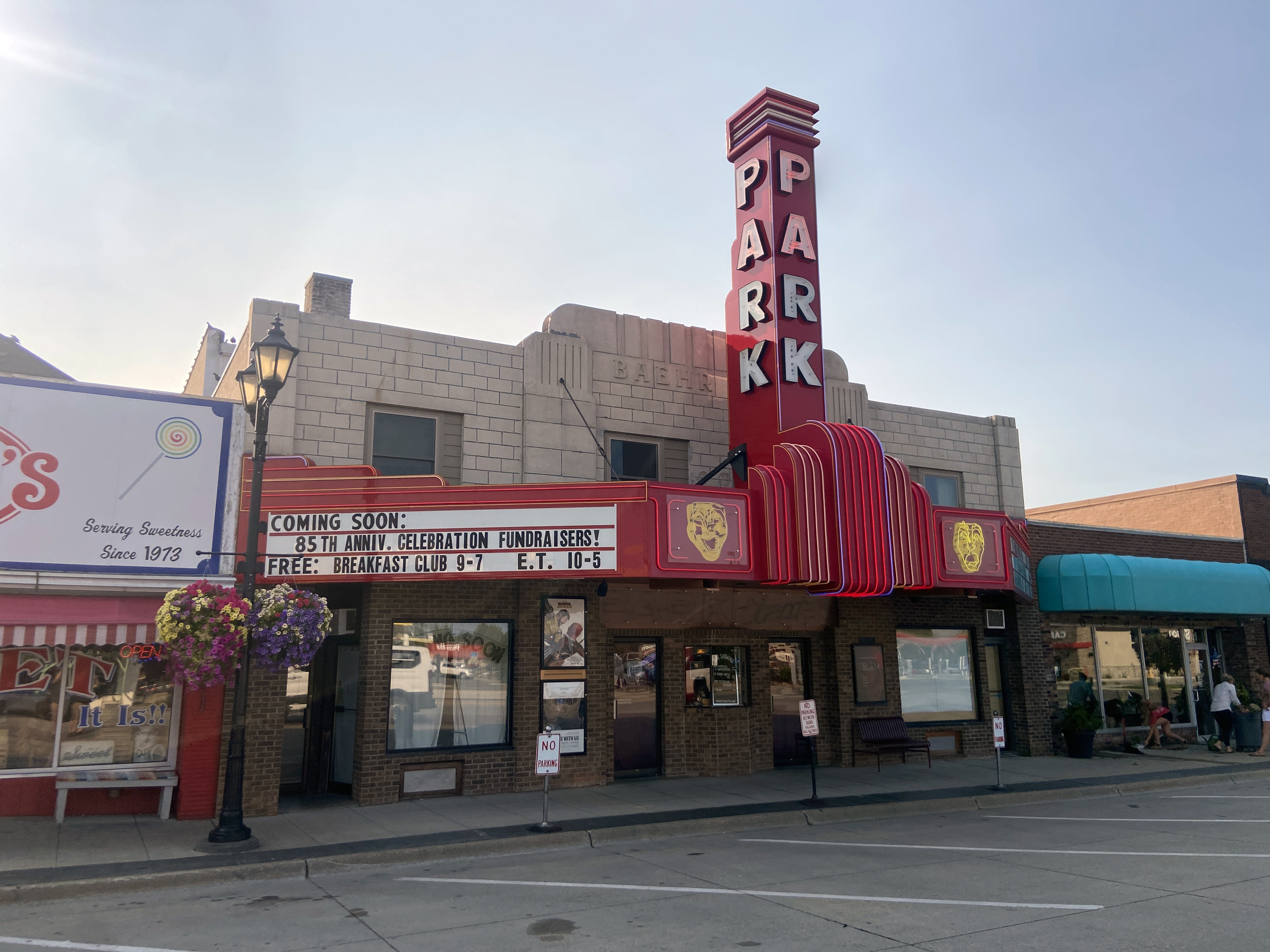
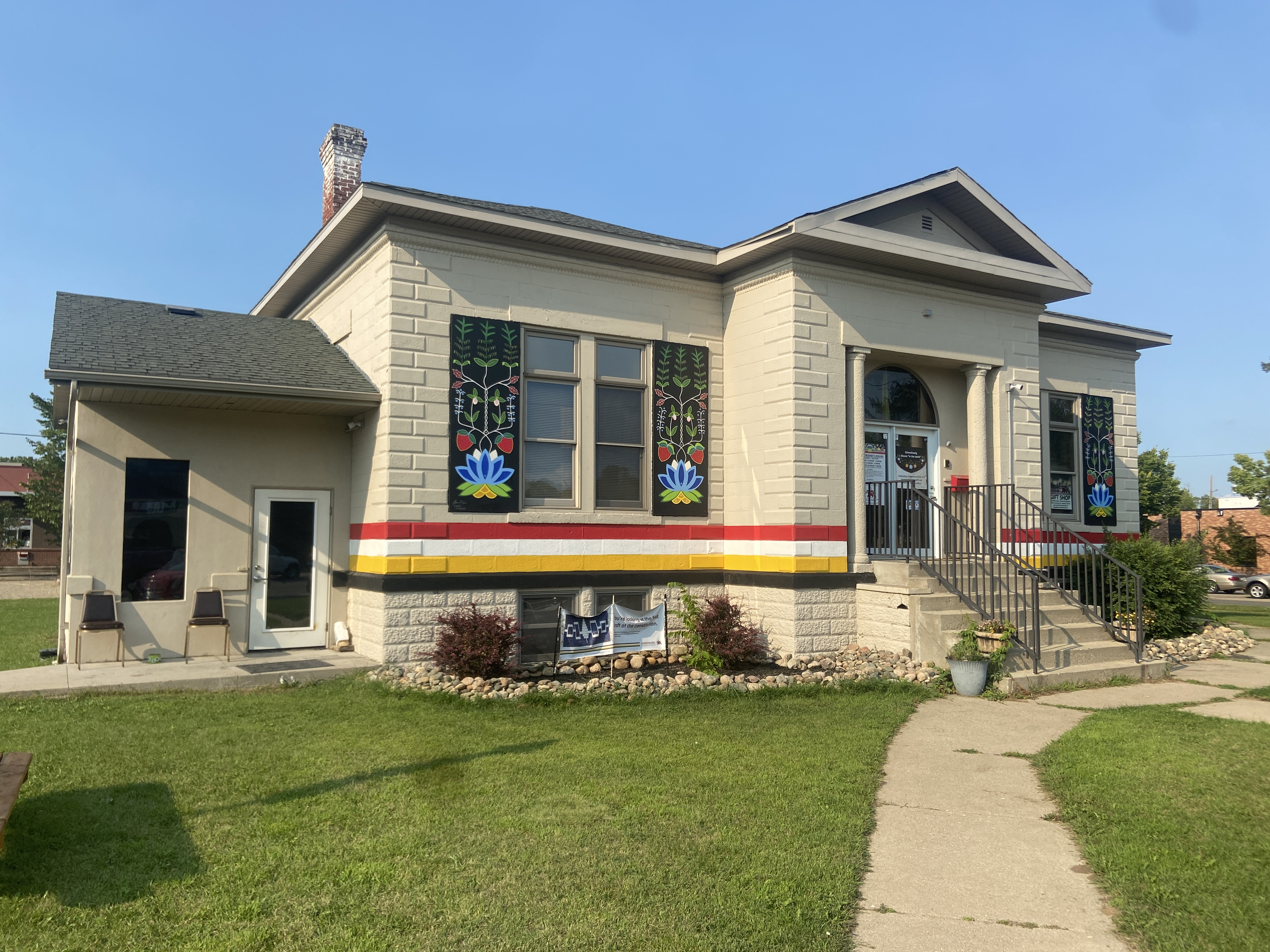
- Downtown Park Theater Giiwedinong Treaty Rights and Culture Museum

- Location of Park Rapids within Hubbard County and state of Minnesota
- Coordinates: 46°55′N 95°3′W
- Country: United States
- State: Minnesota
- County: Hubbard
- Founded: 1882
- Incorporated: November 25, 1890

Government
  - Mayor: Ryan Leckner

Area
  - Total: 7.66 sq mi (19.85 km^{2})
  - Land: 7.39 sq mi (19.14 km^{2})
  - Water: 0.28 sq mi (0.72 km^{2})
- Elevation: 1,440 ft (439 m)

Population (2020)
  - Total: 4,142
  - Estimate (2022): 4,269
  - Density: 560.6/sq mi (216.45/km^{2})
- Time zone: UTC-6 (Central (CST))
  - Summer (DST): UTC-5 (CDT)
- ZIP code: 56470
- Area code: 218
- FIPS code: 27-49768
- GNIS feature ID: 0649151
- Website: ci.park-rapids.mn.us

Park Rapids is a city in and the county seat of Hubbard County, Minnesota, United States. It is near Itasca State Park, the source of the Mississippi River, as well as the beginning of the Heartland State Trail. The city was founded in 1890 near the Fish Hook River rapids and is along U.S. Highway 71 and Minnesota State Highway 34. The population was 4,142 at the 2020 census.

== History ==
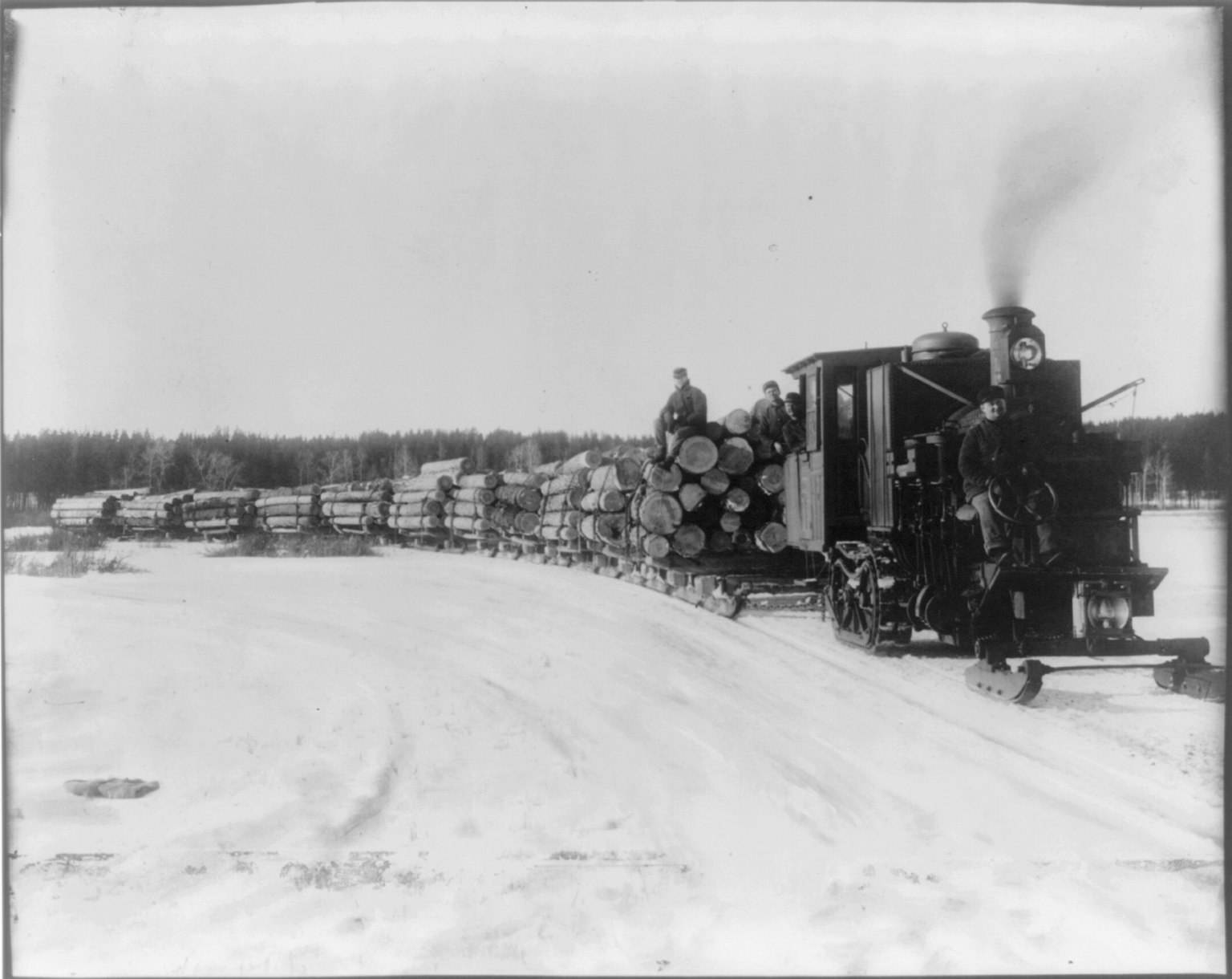
Steam hauler moving logs along snow on skids

The land that is now Park Rapids was originally inhabited by Native American tribes, including the Ojibwe (Chippewa) people, who still have a significant presence in the region. Park Rapids became a city in 1882, and was named by Frank C. Rice after the park groves and prairies beside the Fish Hook River rapids. These rapids have since been dammed. Located at the convergence of prairie and pine forest, Park Rapids emerged as a supply depot for farmers and the lumber industry. It was a crucial hub for trappers, the local Ojibwe community, and timber cruisers to exchange goods, report, and replenished supplies. Later, Park Rapids grew into a logging center, with numerous trails leading north for tote teams transporting goods. Its main street was made unusually wide to accommodate the long, horse-drawn teams essential to the town's operations.

== Infrastructure ==
=== Transportation ===
Park Rapids and the surrounding Hubbard County area have three major transportation services. South of the city center at 212 W. 2nd Street is Park Rapids Municipal Airport (officially Konshok Field), a general aviation airport. According to the FAA, the airfield is publicly owned by the City of Park Rapids. Also serving the Park Rapids and Hubbard County area for ground transportation is the Hubbard County Heartland Express bus service and a local taxi service. The closest commercial airport is Bemidji Regional Airport, which is served only by Delta Connection flights to Minneapolis–Saint Paul International Airport, about 200 miles from Park Rapids.

==== Major highways ====
U.S. Highway 71 and Minnesota State Highway 34 are two of the main routes through Park Rapids. Highway 34 was expanded in 2008 into a five-lane route through the city. Downtown Main Avenue has street "center parking". Highway 71 and Main Street were reconstructed in 2009.

== Geography ==
According to the United States Census Bureau, the city has an area of 6.81 square miles (17.64 km^{2}), of which 6.59 square miles (17.07 km^{2}) is land and 0.22 square miles (0.57 km^{2}) is water. The Fish Hook River flows through the city, which is surrounded by three lakes: Fish Hook, Long, and Potato.

== Climate ==
Park Rapids has a humid continental climate (Köppen Dwb), with warm summers and long, cold snowy winters.

Climate data for Park Rapids Municipal Airport, Minnesota (1991–2020 normals, extremes 1893–present)
Month	Jan	Feb	Mar	Apr	May	Jun	Jul	Aug	Sep	Oct	Nov	Dec	Year
Record high °F (°C)	58 (14)	61 (16)	80 (27)	96 (36)	99 (37)	105 (41)	107 (42)	103 (39)	99 (37)	90 (32)	73 (23)	60 (16)	107 (42)
Mean daily maximum °F (°C)	18.1 (−7.7)	23.8 (−4.6)	36.9 (2.7)	52.6 (11.4)	66.5 (19.2)	75.7 (24.3)	80.2 (26.8)	78.6 (25.9)	69.2 (20.7)	53.6 (12.0)	36.4 (2.4)	23.1 (−4.9)	51.2 (10.7)
Daily mean °F (°C)	7.6 (−13.6)	12.3 (−10.9)	26.3 (−3.2)	41.0 (5.0)	54.2 (12.3)	64.2 (17.9)	68.7 (20.4)	66.7 (19.3)	57.8 (14.3)	43.6 (6.4)	27.9 (−2.3)	14.2 (−9.9)	40.4 (4.7)
Mean daily minimum °F (°C)	−2.8 (−19.3)	0.8 (−17.3)	15.6 (−9.1)	29.3 (−1.5)	41.9 (5.5)	52.8 (11.6)	57.1 (13.9)	54.8 (12.7)	46.3 (7.9)	33.5 (0.8)	19.3 (−7.1)	5.4 (−14.8)	29.5 (−1.4)
Record low °F (°C)	−47 (−44)	−51 (−46)	−38 (−39)	−8 (−22)	14 (−10)	27 (−3)	35 (2)	31 (−1)	17 (−8)	−3 (−19)	−32 (−36)	−46 (−43)	−51 (−46)
Average precipitation inches (mm)	0.43 (11)	0.40 (10)	1.00 (25)	1.72 (44)	3.09 (78)	4.08 (104)	3.93 (100)	2.78 (71)	2.70 (69)	2.40 (61)	0.81 (21)	0.52 (13)	23.86 (606)
Average precipitation days (≥ 0.01 in)	5.6	4.7	6.6	7.8	11.7	12.4	11.7	10.1	10.0	9.9	6.1	6.8	103.4
Source: NOAA

== Demographics ==
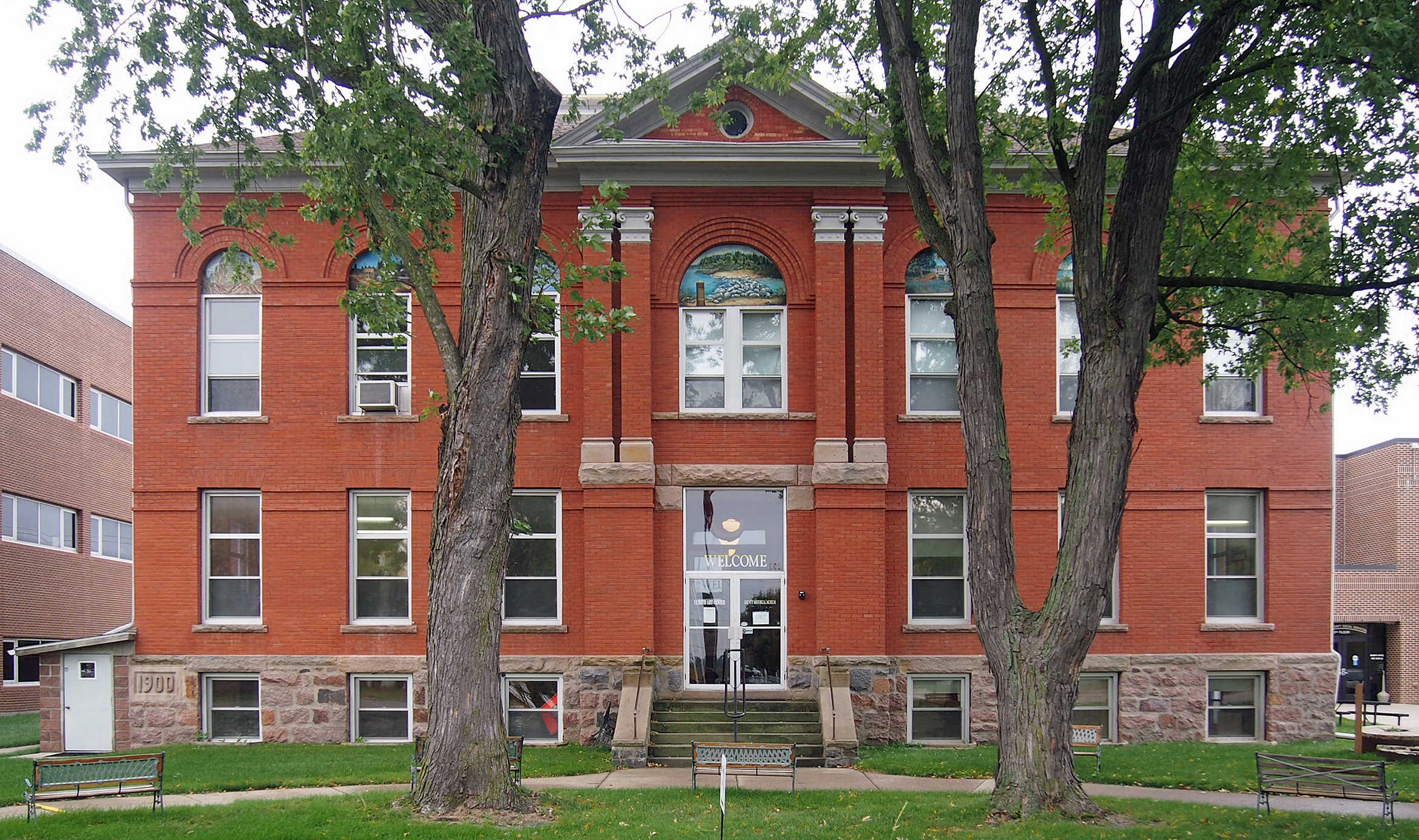
Hubbard County Courthouse

Historical population
Census	Pop.	Note	%±
1900	1,313		—
1910	1,801		37.2%
1920	1,603		−11.0%
1930	2,081		29.8%
1940	2,643		27.0%
1950	3,027		14.5%
1960	3,047		0.7%
1970	2,772		−9.0%
1980	2,976		7.4%
1990	2,863		−3.8%
2000	3,276		14.4%
2010	3,709		13.2%
2020	4,142		11.7%
2022 (est.)	4,269		3.1%
U.S. Decennial Census; 2020 Census

=== 2020 census ===
As of the 2020 census, Park Rapids had a population of 4,142. The median age was 40.4 years. 23.4% of residents were under the age of 18 and 25.1% of residents were 65 years of age or older. For every 100 females there were 84.6 males, and for every 100 females age 18 and over there were 83.3 males age 18 and over.

0.0% of residents lived in urban areas, while 100.0% lived in rural areas.

There were 1,859 households in Park Rapids, of which 25.4% had children under the age of 18 living in them. Of all households, 32.8% were married-couple households, 21.1% were households with a male householder and no spouse or partner present, and 36.8% were households with a female householder and no spouse or partner present. About 42.5% of all households were made up of individuals and 21.4% had someone living alone who was 65 years of age or older.

There were 2,083 housing units, of which 10.8% were vacant. The homeowner vacancy rate was 1.9% and the rental vacancy rate was 7.3%.

Racial composition as of the 2020 census
Race	Number	Percent
White	3,602	87.0%
Black or African American	31	0.7%
American Indian and Alaska Native	107	2.6%
Asian	26	0.6%
Native Hawaiian and Other Pacific Islander	0	0.0%
Some other race	122	2.9%
Two or more races	254	6.1%
Hispanic or Latino (of any race)	245	5.9%

=== 2010 census ===
As of the census of 2010, there were 3,709 people, 1,772 households, and 892 families residing in the city. The population density was 562.8 inhabitants per square mile (217.3/km^{2}). There were 2,003 housing units at an average density of 303.9 per square mile (117.3/km^{2}). The racial makeup of the city was 94.1% White, 0.4% African American, 2.3% Native American, 0.1% Asian, 1.2% from other races, and 1.9% from two or more races. Hispanic or Latino of any race were 3.7% of the population.

There were 1,772 households, of which 24.7% had children under the age of 18 living with them, 35.2% were married couples living together, 11.6% had a female householder with no husband present, 3.5% had a male householder with no wife present, and 49.7% were non-families. 44.9% of all households were made up of individuals, and 22.5% had someone living alone who was 65 years of age or older. The average household size was 2.03 and the average family size was 2.80.

The median age in the city was 43.1 years. 22.1% of residents were under the age of 18; 8.4% were between the ages of 18 and 24; 21.7% were from 25 to 44; 22.8% were from 45 to 64; and 24.9% were 65 years of age or older. The gender makeup of the city was 46.3% male and 53.7% female.

=== 2000 census ===
As of the census of 2000, there were 3,276 people, 1,476 households, and 788 families residing in the city. The population density was 547.5 inhabitants per square mile (211.4/km^{2}). There were 1,616 housing units at an average density of 270.1 per square mile (104.3/km^{2}). The racial makeup of the city was 95.97% White, 0.31% African American, 2.20% Native American, 0.37% Asian, 0.03% Pacific Islander, 0.46% from other races, and 0.67% from two or more races. Hispanic or Latino of any race were 1.07% of the population.

There were 1,476 households, of which 25.3% had children under the age of 18 living with them, 39.2% were married couples living together, 10.8% had a female householder with no husband present, and 46.6% were non-families. 41.8% of all households were made up of individuals, and 23.3% had someone living alone who was 65 years of age or older. The average household size was 2.11 and the average family size was 2.88.

In the city, the population was spread out, with 23.5% under the age of 18, 7.8% from 18 to 24, 21.9% from 25 to 44, 18.8% from 45 to 64, and 28.1% who were 65 years of age or older. The median age was 42 years. For every 100 females, there were 81.7 males. For every 100 females age 18 and over, there were 77.3 males.

The median income for a household in the city was $23,628, and the median income for a family was $33,958. Males had a median income of $28,718 versus $21,827 for females. The per capita income was $16,416. About 11.6% of families and 12.2% of the population were below the poverty line, including 11.3% of those under age 18 and 13.1% of those age 65 or over.

== Notable people ==
Park Rapids is the birthplace of two notable authors, Will Weaver and Nathan Aaseng. Weaver was born to a farming family and educated at St. Cloud State University, the University of Minnesota, and Stanford University. He worked as a farmer and an educator. Three of his best-known novels are Striking Out, Farm Team, and Hard Ball. They reflect Weaver's upbringing on a northern Minnesota farm. His work has won several awards, including the Friends of American Writers Award (1989) and the Minnesota Book Award for Fiction (1989). Weaver now lives in Bemidji.

Aaseng was the son of a minister and attended Luther College and Luther Seminary. He worked as a microbiologist-biochemist and wrote juvenile nonfiction and fiction. His works include more than 130 books on a variety of subjects. Some examples are Big Red, Wild Trek, and the "You Are the Coach" series.

Minnesota newspaper editor and legislator John A. Ainley, Jr., lived in Park Rapids.

Iowa newspaper editor and legislator Thomas Miller was born in Park Rapids.

Businesswoman and Minnesota state legislator Esther Miriam Fieldman lived in Park Rapids.

Four-time U.S. Paralympian Aaron Pike was born in Park Rapids and spent his first year there before moving away for his father's military career. Pike returned to Park Rapids in the summer and continues to list it as his hometown. He competes in wheelchair racing and Nordic skiing.

== Recreation ==
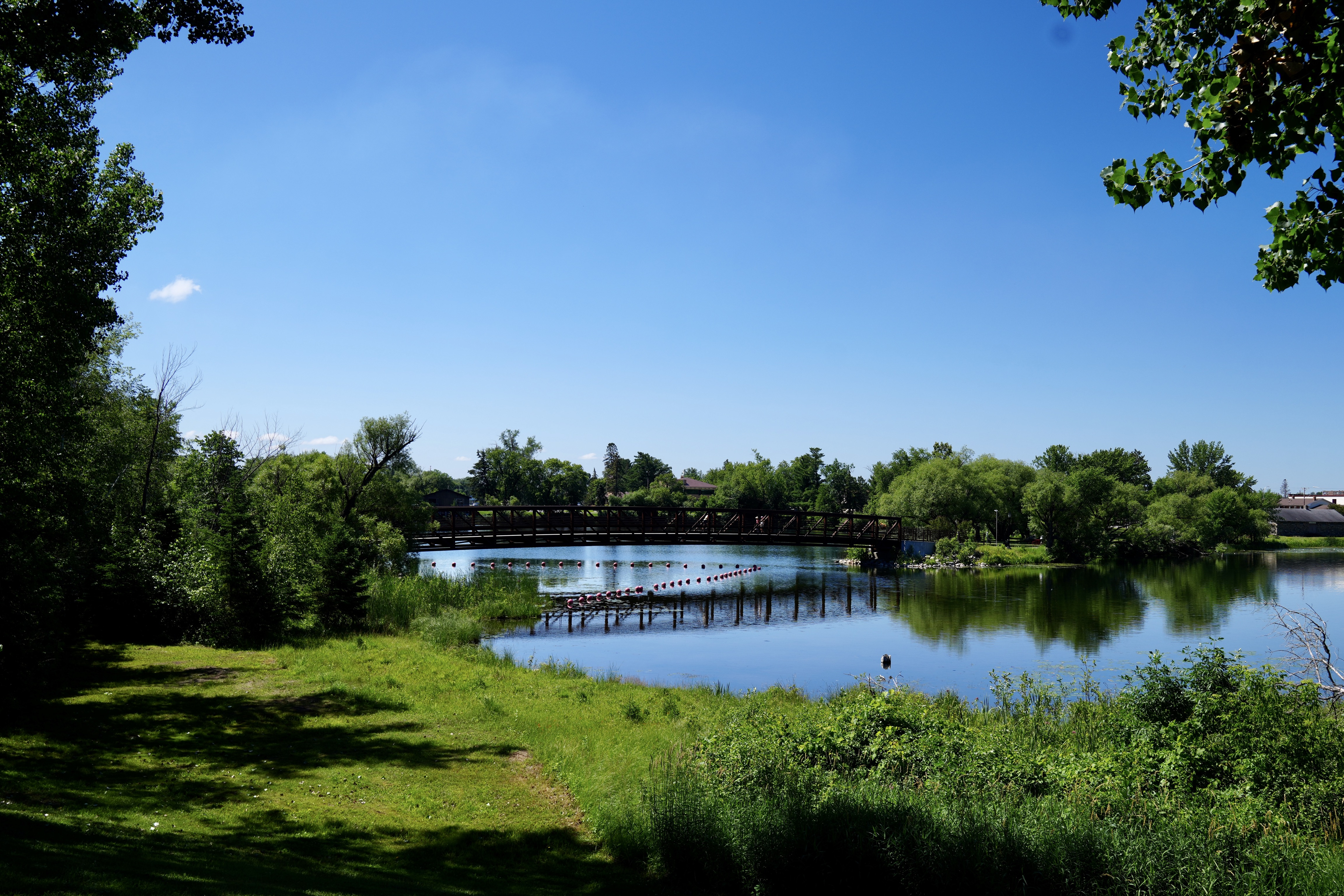
The official start of the Heartland Trail is at Park Rapids' Heartland Park, which has shelters, restrooms, a swimming beach and a bridge across the Fish Hook River.

The Park Rapids area has more than 70 lakes, which all offer fishing opportunities. Notable nearby lakes include Lake Itasca (headwaters of the Mississippi River) and some of the many Crow Wing Lakes. Fish commonly caught in the area include largemouth, smallmouth, and rock bass, bullhead, crappie, northern pike, perch, sunfish, and walleye. The Heartland Trail, one of the oldest rail-to-trail projects in the United States, begins in Park Rapids. The 49-mile trail is open to horseback riding, hiking, snowmobiling, and biking at different segments. Deer, coyote, grey wolf, chipmunks, bobcat, bear, bald eagle, red fox, raccoon, beaver, and muskrat can all be spotted along the trail.

== Arts and culture ==
=== Giiwedinong Treaty Rights and Culture Museum ===
Shortly after Park Rapids was platted, women residents organized the Ladies Library and Reading Club and founded a free public-lending library in the fire station building. The village council then created a library board, which applied for a grant in 1909 to build a Carnegie library. The board was mostly made up of Park Rapids women and had a female president. In 1994, the city council moved the library into a former bank to ensure its accessibility. In 2014, Enbridge, a Canadian oil company, purchased the former library building to serve as a project headquarters during the construction of the Line 3 pipeline replacement. After the pipeline was completed in 2022, Anishinaabe nonprofit Akiing bought the building and named it the Giiwedinong Treaty Rights and Culture Museum. Akiing called the purchase a part of Land Back, because of Andrew Carnegie's historic exploitation of Anishinaabe lands and Enbridge's endangerment of indigenous waters.

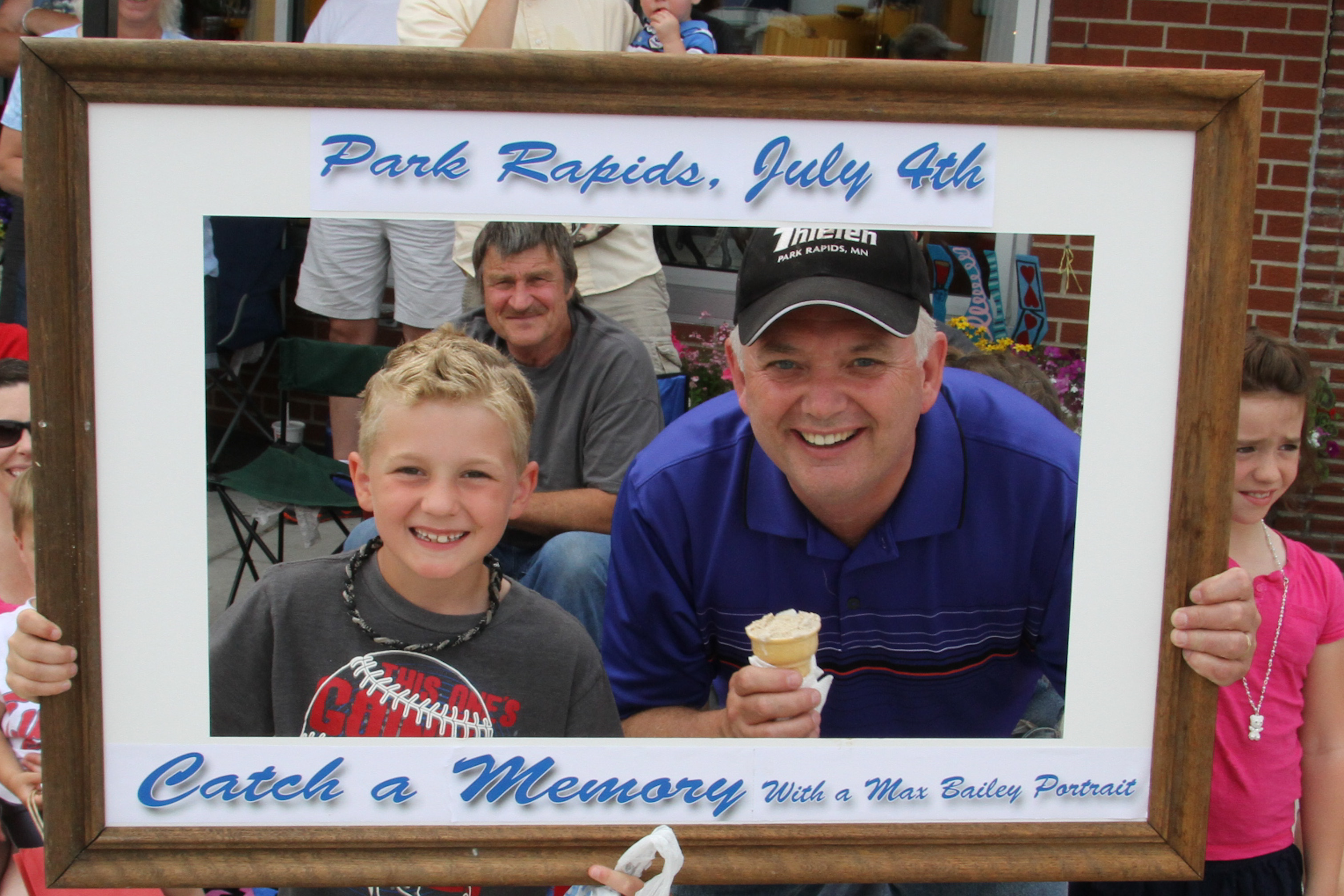
Two Park Rapids residents watching the July 4th Parade on Main street

== Local media ==
Park Rapids is home to De La Hunt Broadcasting, east of the city's downtown. There are three radio stations in Park Rapids:

- KPRM AM 870 (Talk and Classic country)
- KXKK FM 92.5 (Country music)
- KDKK FM 97.5 (Adult standards)

Park Rapids receives five television stations:

- KAWE Ch. 9 PBS (Bemidji)
- KVLY-TV Ch. 11 NBC (Fargo)
- KCCW Ch. 12 CBS (Walker)
- KVRR Ch. 15 FOX (Fargo)
- KSAX Ch. 42 ABC (Alexandria)

The local cable TV provider is Arvig Communication Systems.

=== Newspaper ===
The Forum Communications Company of Fargo, North Dakota, owns and operates the Park Rapids Enterprise, published twice weekly.

== Education ==
Park Rapids Area High School, at 401 Huntsinger Avenue, serves grades 9–12. Century School, at 501 Helten Avenue, houses grades K–8.

Park Rapids had two separate buildings for primary school that split up K–3 and 9–12 from grades 4-8. Frank White Elementary and Park Rapids High School were part of the same building. The Century School was built in 2001 to accommodate grades K–8. Frank White Elementary School was remodeled and pieces of it became part of Park Rapids Area High School, while several Frank White classrooms became preschool classrooms. The old Park Rapids Middle School was sold several times and part of it is now apartments.

== Images ==
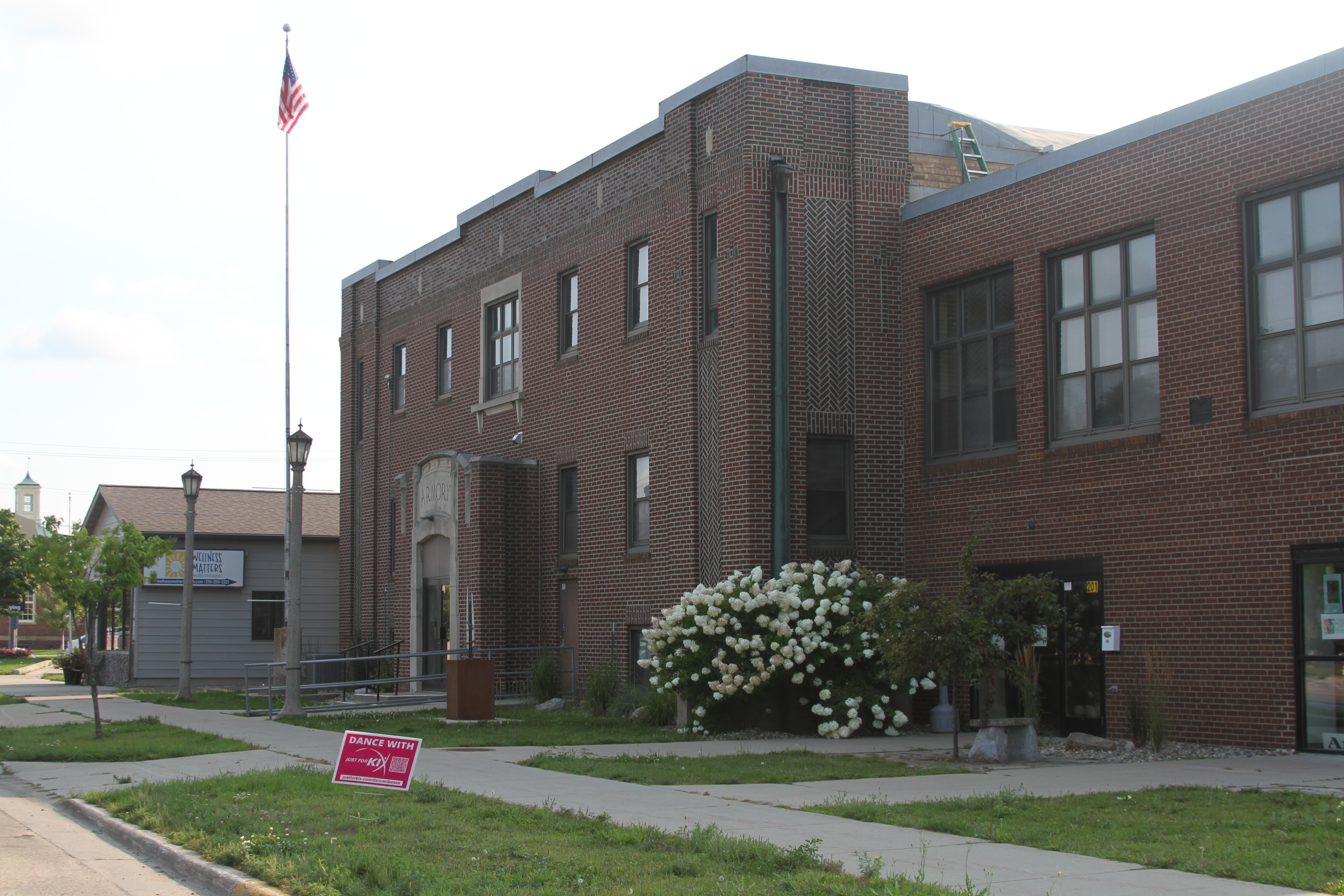
Armory

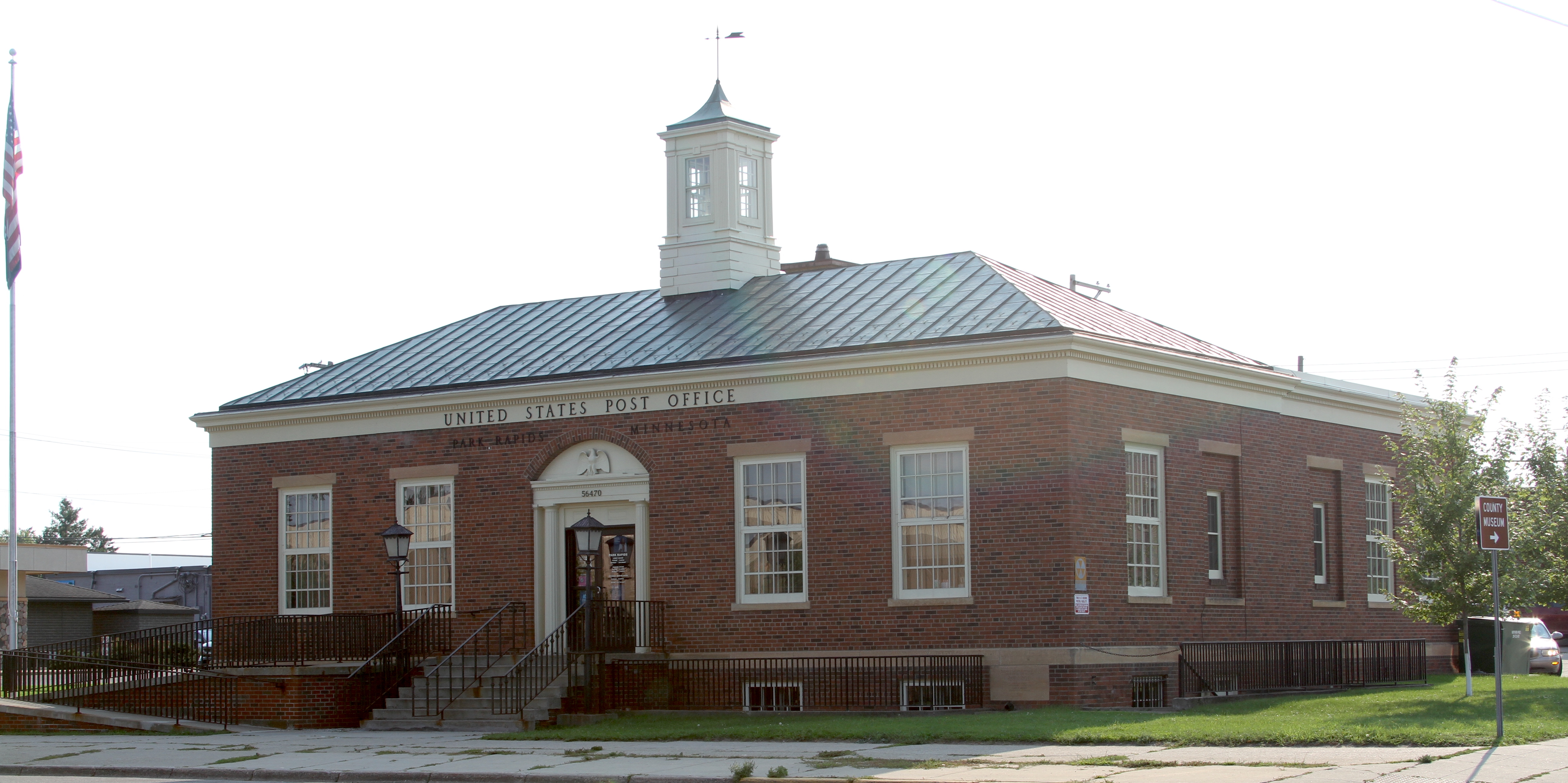
Post Office

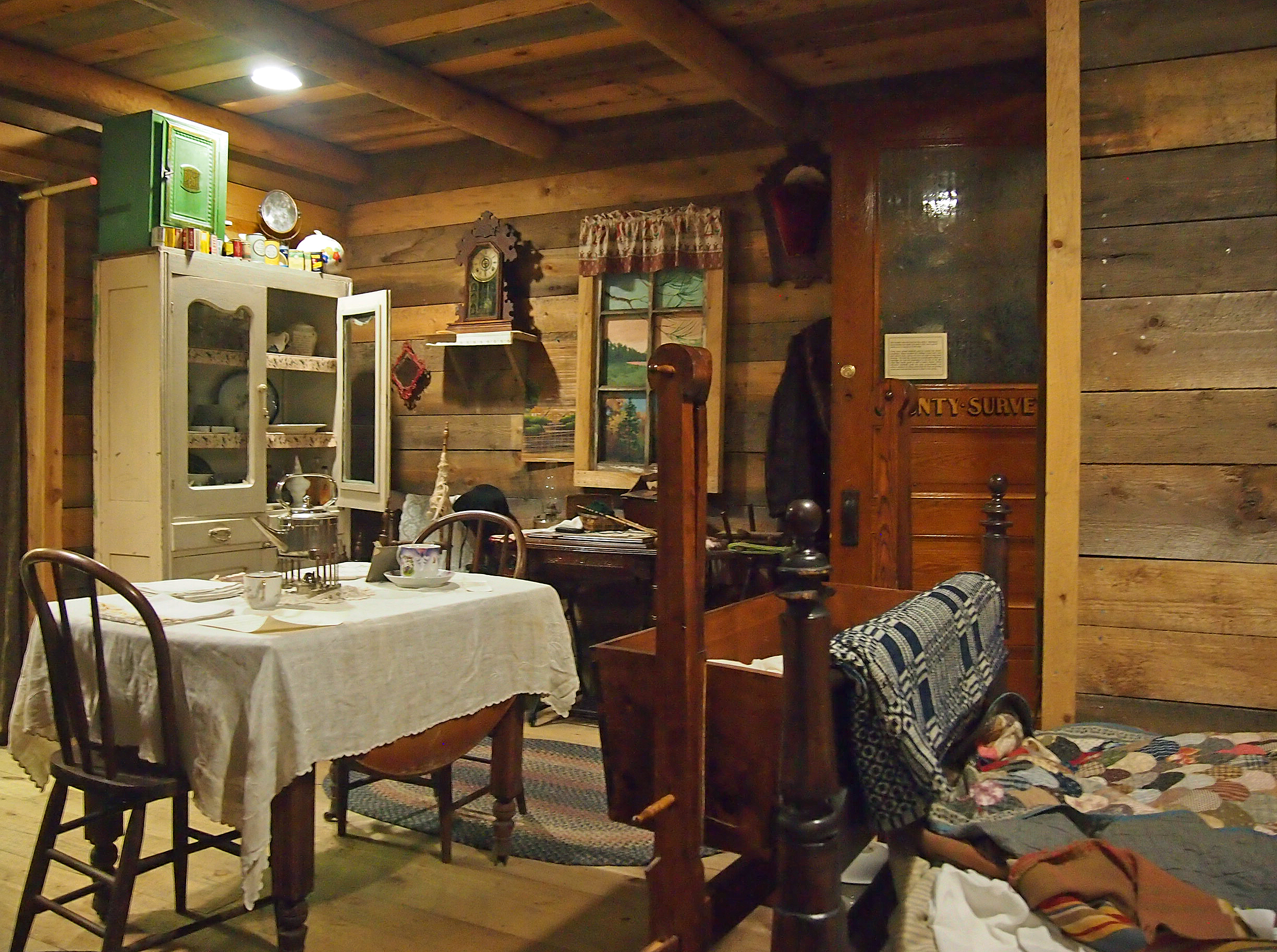
Hubbard County Historical Museum
