= Sun Bear (author) =

American stunt performer (1929–1992)

Sun Bear (born Vincent LaDuke, August 31, 1929 – 1992) was a White Earth Nation actor and New Age author. He was born on August 31, 1929, on the White Earth Indian Reservation to Louis and Judith LaDuke. He was the biological father of activist, author, and former Green Party vice-presidential candidate Winona LaDuke.

He was perhaps best known for his Medicine Wheel Gatherings, New Age weekend campout retreats with paid workshops and activities for spiritual seekers, which were denounced and picketed by the American Indian Movement.

== Bibliography ==
- At Home in the Wilderness (1968)
- The Path of Power (1983)
- Buffalo Hearts, A Native American's View of His Culture, Religion, and History (1986)
- Dancing the Wheel: The Medicine Wheel Workbook (1992)
- Walk in Balance: the Path to Healthy Harmonious Living (1992)
- Black Dawn, Bright Day: Indian Prophecies for the Millennium That Reveal the Fate of the Earth (1992)
- The Medicine Wheel: Earth Astrology (1992)
- Dreaming the Wheel: How to Interpret and Work with Your Dreams Using the Medicine Wheel (1994)
