= Fred W. McDarrah =

American photographer (1926–2007)

- Born: November 5, 1926; Brooklyn, New York City, New York, U.S.
- Died: November 6, 2007 (aged 81); Greenwich Village, New York City, New York, U.S.
- Occupations: Photographer, photojournalist
- Known for: Celebrity photography
- Notable work: Beat Generation
- Spouse: Gloria Schoffel (m. 1960)
- Children: 2, including Timothy McDarrah

Frederick William McDarrah (November 5, 1926 – November 6, 2007) was an American staff photographer for The Village Voice and an author. He is best known for documenting the cultural phenomenon known as the Beat Generation from its inception in the 1950s. In his book The Artist's World in Pictures, co-authored with Thomas B. Hess, McDarrah documented the New York art world, the New York School and the world of Abstract expressionism in New York City during the late 1950s.

== Biography ==
Born in Brooklyn of Catholic and Protestant descent, he said his father "did nothing, never worked, a manic depressive who used to sit by the window and just stare out. We used to live on Home Relief. My brother David and I went begging for food."

He bought his first camera at the 1939 World's Fair for 39 cents, but he did not start taking photographs as a vocation until he was a paratrooper in occupied Japan following World War II.

He was one of the first to photograph Bob Dylan. He photographed people at the time of the Stonewall riots; those pictures were among those gathered in the book Gay Pride (1994), one of over a dozen books including his photographs.

== Exhibitions ==
- 2015. "Fred W. McDarrah: The Artists's World". Solo at Steven Kasher Gallery. New York City
- 2018. "Fred W. McDarrah: New York Scenes." Solo at Steven Kasher Gallery.

== Family ==
In 1960, he married Gloria Schoffel. They had two sons, Timothy and Patrick.

== Death ==
He died in his sleep at his home in Greenwich Village a few hours after his 81st birthday.

== Books by McDarrah ==
- McDarrah, Fred W. The Beat Scene. Corinth Books, 1960
- McDarrah, Fred W., and Gloria S. McDarrah. The Artist's World in Pictures. New York: Dutton, 1961
- McDarrah, Fred W., and McDarrah, Timothy S. Museums In New York. New York: A Frommer Book, 1983
- McDarrah, Fred W., and Patrick J. McDarrah. The Greenwich Village Guide: Sixteen Historic Walks, Includes Soho, Tribeca, and the East Village: Antique Shops, Bookstores, Theatres, Clubs, Restaurants, Art Galleries and More. Chicago, IL: Chicago Review, 1992
- McDarrah, Fred W., Timothy S. McDarrah, and Robert Taylor. Gay Pride: Photographs from Stonewall to Today. Chicago, IL: Cappella, 1994
- McDarrah, Fred W., and Gloria S. McDarrah. Beat Generation: Glory Days in Greenwich Village. New York: Schirmer, 1996
- MacDarrah, Fred W., and Timothy S. MacDarrah. Kerouac and Friends: A Beat Generation Album. New York: Thunder's Mouth, 2002
- McDarrah, Fred W., Gloria S. McDarrah, and Timothy S. McDarrah. Anarchy, Protest & Rebellion: And the Counterculture That Changed America. New York: Thunder's Mouth, 2003
- McDarrah, Fred W. Artists and Writers of the 60s and 70s: An Exhibition of Vintage Prints at Steven Kasher Gallery, November 9, 2006 – January 6, 2007. New York, NY: Steven Kasher Gallery, 2006

== Book On McDarrah ==
- Wilentz, Sean Fred W. McDarrah: New York Scenes, Abrams Books, 2018
