= Cultural imperialism =

Cultural aspects of imperialism

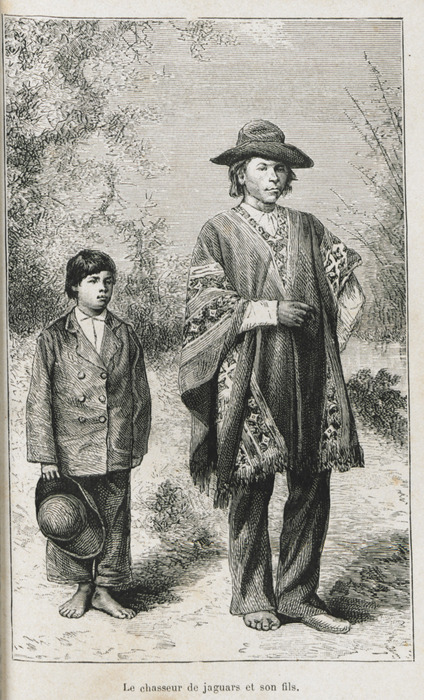
A jaguar hunter and his son, natives of the Chaco Boreal. The father continues to wear the traditional clothing of his region while the son has already adopted Western clothing.

Cultural imperialism (also cultural colonialism) is the imposition by a dominant group of its own culture onto another community. As a mode of imperialism, it uses cultural practices to enforce a way of life, systematically attempting to transform or erase aspects of the subordinate culture. Cultural imperialism endeavours to create and maintain unequal social and economic relationships among social groups. Imperialists may use wealth, media power, and violence to establish cultural hegemony. Cultural imperialism may take various forms, such as an attitude, a formal policy, or military action—insofar as each of these reinforces the empire's cultural hegemony. Research on the topic occurs in scholarly disciplines, and is especially prevalent in communication and media studies, education, foreign policy, history, international relations, linguistics, literature, post-colonialism, science, sociology, social theory, environmentalism, and sports.

Cultural imperialism may be distinguished from the natural process of cultural diffusion. The spread of culture around the world is referred to as cultural globalization.

== Background and definitions ==
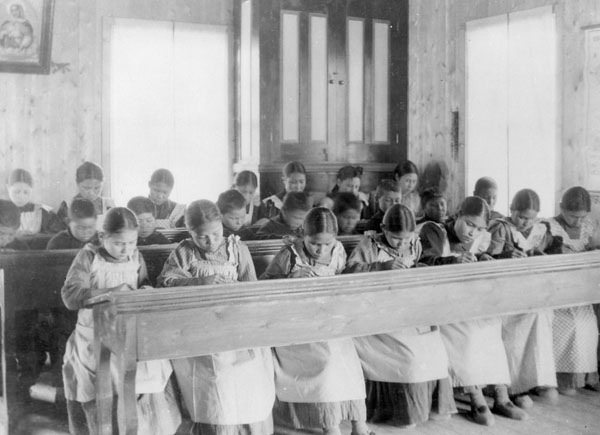
Indigenous children who have been taken from their parents and placed in a Western-style residential school, which aimed to eliminate Indigenous language and culture and replace it with English language and Christian beliefs

Although the Oxford English Dictionary has a 1921 reference to the "cultural imperialism of the Russians", John Tomlinson, in his book on the subject, writes that the term emerged in the 1960s and has been a focus of research since at least the 1970s. Terms such as "media imperialism", "structural imperialism", "cultural dependency and domination", "cultural synchronization", "electronic colonialism", "ideological imperialism", and "economic imperialism" have all been used to describe the same basic notion of cultural imperialism.

The term refers largely to the exercise of power in a cultural relationship in which the principles, ideas, practices, and values of a powerful, invading society are imposed upon indigenous cultures in the occupied areas. The process is often used to describe examples of when the compulsory practices of the cultural traditions of the imperial social group are implemented upon a conquered social group. The process is also present when powerful nations are able to flood the information and media space with their ideas, limiting countries and communities' ability to compete and expose people to locally created content.

Cultural imperialism has been called a process that intends to transition the "cultural symbols of the invading communities from 'foreign' to 'natural,''domestic,'" comments Jeffrey Herlihy-Mera. He described the process as being carried out in three phases by merchants, then the military, then politicians. While the third phase continues "in perpetuity", cultural imperialism tends to be "gradual, contested (and continues to be contested), and is by nature incomplete. The partial and imperfect configuration of this ontology takes an implicit conceptualization of reality and attempts—and often fails—to elide other forms of collective existence." In order to achieve that end, cultural engineering projects strive to "isolate residents within constructed spheres of symbols" such that they (eventually, in some cases after several generations) abandon other cultures and identify with the new symbols. "The broader intended outcome of these interventions might be described as a common recognition of possession of the land itself (on behalf of the organizations publishing and financing the images)."

For Herbert Schiller, cultural imperialism refers to the American Empire's "coercive and persuasive agencies, and their capacity to promote and universalize an American 'way of life' in other countries without any reciprocation of influence." According to Schiller, cultural imperialism "pressured, forced and bribed" societies to integrate with the U.S.'s expansive capitalist model but also incorporated them with attraction and persuasion by winning "the mutual consent, even solicitation of the indigenous rulers." He continues remarks that it is:

the sum processes by which a society is brought into the modern [U.S.-centered] world system and how its dominating stratum is attracted, pressured, forced, and sometimes bribed into shaping social institutions to correspond to, or even promote, the values and structures of the dominating centres of the system. The public media are the foremost example of operating enterprises that are used in the penetrative process. For penetration on a significant scale the media themselves must be captured by the dominating/penetrating power. This occurs largely through the commercialization of broadcasting.

The historical contexts, iterations, complexities, and politics of Schiller's foundational and substantive theorization of cultural imperialism in international communication and media studies are discussed in detail by political economy of communication researchers Richard Maxwell, Vincent Mosco, Graham Murdock, and Tanner Mirrlees. Downing and Sreberny-Mohammadi state:

"Cultural imperialism signifies the dimensions of the process that go beyond economic exploitation or military force. In the history of colonialism, (i.e., the form of imperialism in which the government of the colony is run directly by foreigners), the educational and media systems of many Third World countries have been set up as replicas of those in Britain, France, or the United States and carry their values. Western advertising has made further inroads, as have architectural and fashion styles. Subtly but powerfully, the message has often been insinuated that Western cultures are superior to the cultures of the Third World."

=== Poststructuralism ===
In poststructuralist and postcolonial theory, cultural imperialism is often understood as the cultural legacy of Western colonialism, or forms of social action contributing to the continuation of Western hegemony. To some outside of the realm of this discourse, the term is critiqued as being unclear, unfocused, and/or contradictory in nature.

The work of French philosopher and social theorist Michel Foucault has heavily influenced use of the term cultural imperialism, particularly his philosophical interpretation of power and his concept of governmentality. Following an interpretation of power similar to that of Machiavelli, Foucault defines power as immaterial, as a "certain type of relation between individuals" that has to do with complex strategic social positions that relate to the subject's ability to control its environment and influence those around itself. According to Foucault, power is intimately tied with his conception of truth. "Truth", as he defines it, is a "system of ordered procedures for the production, regulation, distribution, circulation, and operation of statements" which has a "circular relation" with systems of power. Therefore, inherent in systems of power, is always "truth", which is culturally specific, inseparable from ideology which often coincides with various forms of hegemony, including cultural imperialism.

Foucault's interpretation of governance is also very important in constructing theories of transnational power structure. In his lectures at the Collège de France, Foucault often defines governmentality as the broad art of "governing", which goes beyond the traditional conception of governance in terms of state mandates, and into other realms such as governing "a household, souls, children, a province, a convent, a religious order, a family". This relates directly back to Machiavelli's treatise on how to retain political power at any cost, The Prince, and Foucault's aforementioned conceptions of truth and power. (i.e. various subjectivities are created through power relations that are culturally specific, which lead to various forms of culturally specific governmentality such as neoliberal governmentality.)

=== Post-colonialism ===
Edward Saïd is a founding figure of postcolonialism, established with the book Orientalism (1978), a humanist critique of The Enlightenment, which criticises Western knowledge of "The East"—specifically the English and the French constructions of what is and what is not "Oriental". Whereby said "knowledge" then led to cultural tendencies towards a binary opposition of the Orient vs. the Occident, wherein one concept is defined in opposition to the other concept, and from which they emerge as of unequal value. In Culture and Imperialism (1993), the sequel to Orientalism, Saïd proposes that, despite the formal end of the "age of empire" after the Second World War (1939–1945), colonial imperialism left a cultural legacy to the (previously) colonised peoples, which remains in their contemporary civilisations; and that said American cultural imperialism is very influential in the international systems of power.

In "Can the Subaltern Speak?" Gayatri Chakravorty Spivak critiques common representations in the West of the Sati, as being controlled by authors other than the participants (specifically English colonizers and Hindu leaders). Because of this, Spivak argues that the subaltern, referring to the communities that participate in the Sati, are not able to represent themselves through their own voice. Spivak says that cultural imperialism has the power to disqualify or erase the knowledge and mode of education of certain populations that are low on the social and economic hierarchy.

In A Critique of Postcolonial Reason, Spivak argues that Western philosophy has a history of not only exclusion of the subaltern from discourse, but also does not allow them to occupy the space of a fully human subject.

== Contemporary ideas and debate ==
Cultural imperialism can refer to either the forced acculturation of a subject population, or to the voluntary embracing of a foreign culture by individuals who do so of their own free will. Since these are two very different referents, the validity of the term has been called into question.

Cultural influence can be seen by the "receiving" culture as either a threat to or an enrichment of its cultural identity. It seems therefore useful to distinguish between cultural imperialism as an (active or passive) attitude of superiority, and the position of a culture or group that seeks to complement its own cultural production, considered partly deficient, with imported products.

The imported products or services can themselves represent, or be associated with, certain values (such as consumerism). According to one argument, the "receiving" culture does not necessarily perceive this link, but instead absorbs the foreign culture passively through the use of the foreign goods and services. Due to its somewhat concealed, but very potent nature, this hypothetical idea is described by some experts as "banal imperialism". For example, it is argued that while "American companies are accused of wanting to control 95 percent of the world's consumers", "cultural imperialism involves much more than simple consumer goods; it involved the dissemination of American principles such as freedom and democracy", a process which "may sound appealing" but which "masks a frightening truth: many cultures around the world are disappearing due to the overwhelming influence of corporate and cultural America".

Some believe that the newly globalised economy of the late 20th and early 21st century has facilitated this process through the use of new information technology. This kind of cultural imperialism is derived from what is called "soft power". The theory of electronic colonialism extends the issue to global cultural issues and the impact of major multi-media conglomerates, ranging from Paramount, WarnerMedia, AT&T, Disney, News Corp, to Google and Microsoft with the focus on the hegemonic power of these mainly United States–based communication giants.

=== Cultural Imperialism in Beauty and Media Industries ===
Scholars have argued that cultural imperialism also operates through the global beauty and media industries, where colonial hierarchies of race and appearance continue to influence aesthetic values. The preference for lighter skin and Eurocentric facial features has been traced to colonial systems that historically associated whiteness with civilization, intelligence and social superiority. During European colonization, pigmentation-based hierarchies became entrenched, putting pale skin as a marker of purity and power while darker skin was linked to inferiority.

These hierarchies persist in globalized commerce and mass media. In many postcolonial societies, lighter skin remains associated with notions of beauty, privilege, and upward social mobility. In Mexico, for example, colonial and religious legacies continue to elevate whiteness as an aesthetic ideal while obscuring the racism embedded within these standards. Across Asia, Africa, and Latin America, skin-lightening products are widely marketed as tools for empowerment or professional success, reinforcing the notion that proximity to whiteness offers social and economic advantage.

The global cosmetics industry functions as both an economic force and a cultural mediator of these ideals. Through marketing strategies that promote "whitening", "brightening", or "renewal", it commodifies Eurocentric beauty standards and presents them as universal aspirations. The media and advertising industries contribute to the global spread of Eurocentric beauty ideals through film, television, and digital platforms that often present these aesthetics as universal standards of attractiveness.

These beauty norms extend beyond skin tone to include facial structure, hair texture, and body shape. Western beauty ideals, such as slimness, height and fine features, are frequently applauded, while traits outside of these norms are marginalized. Cosmetic practices such as hair straightening, contouring, and plastic surgery often try to reinforce these traits, reinforcing narrow aesthetic expectations. Critics argue that the normalization of whiteness as a global beauty standard perpetuates the colonial practice of attributing a person's worth to their racialized identity, suggesting the need for decolonization in the beauty industry.

=== Cultural diversity ===
One of the reasons often given for opposing any form of cultural imperialism, voluntary or otherwise, is the preservation of cultural diversity, a goal seen by some as analogous to the preservation of ecological diversity. Proponents of this idea argue either that such diversity is valuable in itself, to preserve human historical heritage and knowledge, or instrumentally valuable because it makes available more ways of solving problems and responding to catastrophes, natural or otherwise.

=== Africa ===
Of all the areas of the world that scholars have claimed to be adversely affected by imperialism, Africa is probably the most notable. In the expansive "age of imperialism" of the nineteenth century, scholars have argued that European colonisation in Africa has led to the elimination of many various cultures, worldviews, and epistemologies, particularly through neocolonisation of public education. This, arguably has led to uneven development, and further informal forms of social control having to do with culture and imperialism. A variety of factors, scholars argue, lead to the elimination of cultures, worldviews, and epistemologies, such as "de-linguicization" (replacing native African languages with European ones), devaluing ontologies that are not explicitly individualistic, and at times going as far as to not only define Western culture itself as science, but that non-Western approaches to science, the Arts, indigenous culture, etc. are not even knowledge. One scholar, Ali A. Abdi, claims that imperialism inherently "involve[s] extensively interactive regimes and heavy contexts of identity deformation, misrecognition, loss of self-esteem, and individual and social doubt in self-efficacy." Therefore, all imperialism would always, already be cultural.

=== Neoliberalism ===
Neoliberalism is often critiqued by sociologists, anthropologists, and cultural studies scholars as being culturally imperialistic. Critics of neoliberalism, at times, claim that it is the newly predominant form of imperialism. Other scholars, such as Elizabeth Dunn and Julia Elyachar have claimed that neoliberalism requires and creates its own form of governmentality.

In Dunn's work, Privatizing Poland, she argues that the expansion of the multinational corporation, Gerber, into Poland in the 1990s imposed Western, neoliberal governmentality, ideologies, and epistemologies upon the post-Soviet people hired. Cultural conflicts occurred most notably the company's inherent individualistic policies, such as promoting competition among workers rather than cooperation, and in its strong opposition to what the company owners claimed was bribery.

In Elyachar's work, Markets of Dispossession, she focuses on ways in which, in Cairo, NGOs along with INGOs and the state promoted neoliberal governmentality through schemas of economic development that relied upon "youth microentrepreneurs". Youth microentrepreneurs would receive small loans to build their own businesses, similar to the way that microfinance supposedly operates. Elyachar argues though, that these programs not only were a failure, but that they shifted cultural opinions of value (personal and cultural) in a way that favoured Western ways of thinking and being.

=== Development studies ===
Often, methods of promoting development and social justice are critiqued as being imperialistic in a cultural sense. For example, Chandra Mohanty has critiqued Western feminism, claiming that it has created a misrepresentation of the "third world woman" as being completely powerless, unable to resist male dominance. Thus, this leads to the often critiqued narrative of the "white man" saving the "brown woman" from the "brown man". Other, more radical critiques of development studies, have to do with the field of study itself. Some scholars even question the intentions of those developing the field of study, claiming that efforts to "develop" the Global South were never about the South itself. Instead, these efforts, it is argued, were made in order to advance Western development and reinforce Western hegemony.

=== Media effects studies ===
The core of cultural imperialism thesis is integrated with the political-economy traditional approach in media effects research. Critics of cultural imperialism commonly claim that non-Western cultures, particularly from the Third World, will forsake their traditional values and lose their cultural identities when they are solely exposed to Western media. Nonetheless, Michael B. Salwen, in his book Critical Studies in Mass Communication (1991), claims that cross-consideration and integration of empirical findings on cultural imperialist influences is very critical in terms of understanding mass media in the international sphere. He recognises both of contradictory contexts on cultural imperialist impacts. The first context is where cultural imperialism imposes socio-political disruptions on developing nations. Western media can distort images of foreign cultures and provoke personal and social conflicts to developing nations in some cases. Another context is that peoples in developing nations resist to foreign media and preserve their cultural attitudes. Although he admits that outward manifestations of Western culture may be adopted, but the fundamental values and behaviours remain still. Furthermore, positive effects might occur when male-dominated cultures adopt the "liberation" of women with exposure to Western media and it stimulates ample exchange of cultural exchange.

=== Criticisms of "cultural imperialism theory" ===
Critics of scholars who discuss cultural imperialism have a number of critiques. Cultural imperialism is a term that is only used in discussions where cultural relativism and constructivism are generally taken as true. (One cannot critique promoting Western values if one believes that said values are good. Similarly, one cannot argue that Western epistemology is unjustly promoted in non-Western societies if one believes that those epistemologies are good.) Therefore, those who disagree with cultural relativism and/or constructivism may critique the employment of the term, cultural imperialism on those terms.

John Tomlinson provides a critique of cultural imperialism theory and reveals major problems in the way in which the idea of cultural, as opposed to economic or political, imperialism is formulated. In his book Cultural Imperialism: A Critical Introduction, he delves into the much debated "media imperialism" theory. Summarizing research on the Third World's reception of American television shows, he challenges the cultural imperialism argument, conveying his doubts about the degree to which US shows in developing nations actually carry US values and improve the profits of US companies. Tomlinson suggests that cultural imperialism is growing in some respects, but local transformation and interpretations of imported media products propose that cultural diversification is not at an end in global society. He explains that one of the fundamental conceptual mistakes of cultural imperialism is to take for granted that the distribution of cultural goods can be considered as cultural dominance. He thus supports his argument highly criticising the concept that Americanization is occurring through global overflow of American television products. He points to a myriad of examples of television networks who have managed to dominate their domestic markets and that domestic programs generally top the ratings. He also doubts the concept that cultural agents are passive receivers of information. He states that movement between cultural/geographical areas always involves translation, mutation, adaptation, and the creation of hybridity.

Other key critiques are that the term is not defined well, and employs further terms that are not defined well, and therefore lacks explanatory power, that cultural imperialism is hard to measure, and that the theory of a legacy of colonialism is not always true.

=== Dealing with cultural dominance ===
David Rothkopf, managing director of Kissinger Associates and an adjunct professor of international affairs at Columbia University (who also served as a senior U.S. Commerce Department official in the Clinton Administration), wrote about cultural imperialism in his provocatively titled In Praise of Cultural Imperialism? in the summer 1997 issue of Foreign Policy magazine. Rothkopf says that the United States should embrace "cultural imperialism" as in its self-interest. But his definition of cultural imperialism stresses spreading the values of tolerance and openness to cultural change in order to avoid war and conflict between cultures as well as expanding accepted technological and legal standards to provide free traders with enough security to do business with more countries. Rothkopf's definition almost exclusively involves allowing individuals in other nations to accept or reject foreign cultural influences. He also mentions, but only in passing, the use of the English language and consumption of news and popular music and film as cultural dominance that he supports. Rothkopf additionally makes the point that globalisation and the Internet are accelerating the process of cultural influence.

Culture is sometimes used by the organisers of society—politicians, theologians, academics, and families—to impose and ensure order, the rudiments of which change over time as need dictates. One need only look at the 20th century's genocides. In each one, leaders used culture as a political front to fuel the passions of their armies and other minions and to justify their actions among their people.

Rothkopf then cites genocide and massacres in Armenia, Russia, the Holocaust, Cambodia, Bosnia and Herzegovina, Rwanda and East Timor as examples of culture (in some cases expressed in the ideology of "political culture" or religion) being misused to justify violence. He also acknowledges that cultural imperialism in the past has been guilty of forcefully eliminating the cultures of natives in the Americas and in Africa, or through use of the Inquisition, "and during the expansion of virtually every empire." The most important way to deal with cultural influence in any nation, according to Rothkopf, is to promote tolerance and allow, or even promote, cultural diversities that are compatible with tolerance and to eliminate those cultural differences that cause violent conflict:

Successful multicultural societies, be they nations, federations, or other conglomerations of closely interrelated states, discern those aspects of culture that do not threaten union, stability, or prosperity (such as food, holidays, rituals, and music) and allow them to flourish. But they counteract or eradicate the more subversive elements of culture (exclusionary aspects of religion, language, and political/ideological beliefs). History shows that bridging cultural gaps successfully and serving as a home to diverse peoples requires certain social structures, laws, and institutions that transcend culture. Furthermore, the history of a number of ongoing experiments in multiculturalism, such as in the European Union, India, South Africa, Canada and the United States, suggests that workable, if not perfected, integrative models exist. Each is built on the idea that tolerance is crucial to social well-being, and each at times has been threatened by both intolerance and a heightened emphasis on cultural distinctions. The greater public good warrants eliminating those cultural characteristics that promote conflict or prevent harmony, even as less-divisive, more personally observed cultural distinctions are celebrated and preserved.

Cultural dominance can also be seen in the 1930s in Australia where the Aboriginal Assimilation Policy acted as an attempt to wipe out the Native Australian people. The British settlers tried to biologically alter the skin colour of the Australian Aboriginal people through mixed breeding with white people. The policy also made attempts to forcefully conform Aboriginal people to western ideas of dress and education.

== In history ==
Although the term was popularised in the 1960s, and was used by its original proponents to refer to cultural hegemonies in a post-colonial world, cultural imperialism has also been used to refer to times further in the past.

=== Antiquity ===
The Ancient Greeks have a reputation for spreading their culture around the Mediterranean and Near East through trade and conquest. During the Archaic Period (c. 800 BCE to c. 480 BCE), the burgeoning Greek city-states established settlements and colonies across the Mediterranean Sea, especially in Sicily and southern Italy, influencing the Etruscan and Roman peoples of the region. Greek art affected the style of Scythian artworks through Greek trading colonies in the Black Sea region. In the late-fourth century BC, Alexander the Great conquered Persian and Indian territories all the way to the Indus River Valley and Punjab, spreading Greek religion, art, and science along the way. This resulted in the rise of Hellenistic kingdoms and cities across Egypt, the Near East, Central Asia, and Northwest India, where Greek culture fused with the cultures of the existing populations. The Greek influence prevailed even longer in science and literature: medieval Muslim scholars in the Middle East studied the writings of Aristotle for scientific insights.

The Roman Empire also implemented cultural imperialism. Early Rome, in its conquest of Italy, assimilated the people of Etruria by replacing the Etruscan language with Latin, which led to the demise of that language and of many aspects of Etruscan civilisation. Cultural Romanization grew in many parts of Rome's empire: "many regions receiving Roman culture unwillingly, as a form of cultural imperialism." After Roman armies conquered Greece, Rome set about altering the culture of Greece to conform with Roman ideals. For instance, the Greek habit of stripping naked, in public, for exercise, was looked on askance by Roman writers, who considered the practice to be a cause of the Greeks' effeminacy and enslavement. The Roman example has been linked to modern instances of European imperialism in African countries, bridging the two instances with Slavoj Zizek's discussions of "empty signifiers". The Pax Romana was secured in the empire, in part, by the "forced acculturation of the culturally diverse populations that Rome had conquered." The first documented imperialist occupation of Britain dates from this period.

=== British Empire ===
British worldwide expansion in the 18th and 19th centuries was an economic and political phenomenon. However, "there was also a strong social and cultural dimension to it, which Rudyard Kipling termed the 'white man's burden'." One of the ways this was carried out was by religious proselytising, by, amongst others, the London Missionary Society, which was "an agent of British cultural imperialism." Another way was by the imposition of educational material on the colonies for an "imperial curriculum". Robin A. Butlin writes, "The promotion of empire through books, illustrative materials, and educational syllabuses was widespread, part of an education policy geared to cultural imperialism". This was also true of science and technology in the empire. Douglas M. Peers and Nandini Gooptu note that "Most scholars of colonial science in India now prefer to stress the ways in which science and technology worked in the service of colonialism, as both a 'tool of empire' in the practical sense and as a vehicle for cultural imperialism. In other words, science developed in India in ways that reflected colonial priorities, tending to benefit Europeans at the expense of Indians, while remaining dependent on and subservient to scientific authorities in the colonial metropolis." British sports were spread across the Empire partially as a way of encouraging British values and cultural uniformity, though this was tempered by the fact that colonised peoples gained a sense of nationalistic pride by defeating the British in their own sports.

The analysis of cultural imperialism carried out by Edward Said drew principally from a study of the British Empire. According to Danilo Raponi, the cultural imperialism of the British in the 19th century had a much wider effect than only in the British Empire. He writes, "To paraphrase Said, I see cultural imperialism as a complex cultural hegemony of a country, Great Britain, that in the 19th century had no rivals in terms of its ability to project its power across the world and to influence the cultural, political and commercial affairs of most countries. It is the 'cultural hegemony' of a country whose power to export the most fundamental ideas and concepts at the basis of its understanding of 'civilisation' knew practically no bounds." In this, for example, Raponi includes Italy.

=== Other pre-Second World War examples ===
The New Cambridge Modern History writes about the cultural imperialism of Napoleonic France. Napoleon used the Institut de France "as an instrument for transmuting French universalism into cultural imperialism." Members of the institute (who included Napoleon), descended upon Egypt in 1798. "Upon arrival they organised themselves into an Institute of Cairo. The Rosetta Stone is their most famous find. The science of Egyptology is their legacy."

After the First World War, Germans were worried about the extent of French influence in the occupied Rhineland, which under the terms of the Treaty of Versailles was under Allied control from 1918 to 1930. An early use of the term appeared in an essay by Paul Ruhlmann (as "Peter Hartmann") at that date, entitled French Cultural Imperialism on the Rhine.

=== North American colonisation ===
Keeping in line with the trends of international imperialistic endeavours, the expansion of Canadian and American territory in the 19th century saw cultural imperialism employed as a means of control over indigenous populations. This, when used in conjunction of more traditional forms of ethnic cleansing and genocide in the United States, saw devastating, lasting effects on indigenous communities.

In 2017 Canada celebrated its 150-year anniversary of the confederating of three British colonies. As Catherine Murton Stoehr points out in Origins, a publication organised by the history departments of Ohio State University and Miami University, the occasion came with remembrance of Canada's treatment of First Nations people.

A mere 9 years after the 1867 signing of confederation Canada passed "The Indian Act", a separate and not equal form of government especially for First Nations. The Indian Act remains in place today, confining and constraining Indigenous jurisdiction in every area of life, in direct contravention of the nation's founding treaties with indigenous nations.

Numerous policies focused on indigenous persons came into effect shortly thereafter. Most notable is the use of residential schools across Canada as a means to remove indigenous persons from their culture and instill in them the beliefs and values of the majorised colonial hegemony. The policies of these schools, as described by Ward Churchill in his book Kill the Indian, Save the Man, were to forcefully assimilate students who were often removed with force from their families. These schools forbid students from using their native languages and participating in their own cultural practices. Residential schools were largely run by Christian churches, operating in conjunction with Christian missions with minimal government oversight. The book, Stolen Lives: The Indigenous peoples of Canada and the Indian Residentials Schools, describes this form of operation: "The government provided little leadership, and the clergy in charge were left to decide what to teach and how to teach it. Their priority was to impart the teachings of their church or order—not to provide a good education that could help students in their post-graduation lives." In a New York Times op-ed, Gabrielle Scrimshaw describes her grandparents being forced to send her mother to one of these schools or risk imprisonment. After hiding her mother on "school pick up day" so as to avoid sending their daughter to institutions whose abuse was well known at the time (mid-20th century). Scrimshaw's mother was left with limited options for further education she says and is today illiterate as a result. Scrimshaw explains, "Seven generations of my ancestors went through these schools. Each new family member enrolled meant a compounding of abuse and a steady loss of identity, culture and hope. My mother was the last generation. the experience left her broken, and like so many, she turned to substances to numb these pains." A report, republished by CBC News, estimates nearly 6,000 children died in the care of these schools.

The colonisation of native peoples in North America remains active today despite the closing of the majority of residential schools. This form of cultural imperialism continues in the use of Native Americans as mascots for schools and athletic teams. Jason Edward Black, a professor and chair in the Department of Communication Studies at the University of North Carolina at Charlotte, describes how the use of Native Americans as mascots furthers the colonial attitudes of the 18th and 19th centuries.

Indigenous groups, along with cultural studies scholars, view the Native mascots as hegemonic devices–commodification tools–that advance a contemporary manifest destiny by marketing Native culture as Euromerican identity.

In Deciphering Pocahontas, Kent Ono and Derek Buescher wrote: "Euro-American culture has made a habit of appropriating, and redefining what is 'distinctive' and constitutive of Native Americans."

=== Nazi colonialism ===
Cultural imperialism has also been used in connection with the expansion of German influence under the Nazis in the middle of the twentieth century. Alan Steinweis and Daniel Rogers note that even before the Nazis came to power, "Already in the Weimar Republic, German academic specialists on eastern Europe had contributed through their publications and teaching to the legitimization of German territorial revanchism and cultural imperialism. These scholars operated primarily in the disciplines of history, economics, geography, and literature." In the area of music, Michael Kater writes that during the WWII German occupation of France, Hans Rosbaud, a German conductor based by the Nazi regime in Strasbourg, became "at least nominally, a servant of Nazi cultural imperialism directed against the French."

In Italy during the war, Germany pursued "a European cultural front that gravitates around German culture". The Nazi propaganda minister Joseph Goebbels set up the European Union of Writers, "one of Goebbels's most ambitious projects for Nazi cultural hegemony. Presumably a means of gathering authors from Germany, Italy, and the occupied countries to plan the literary life of the new Europe, the union soon emerged as a vehicle of German cultural imperialism." For other parts of Europe, Robert Gerwarth, writing about cultural imperialism and Reinhard Heydrich, states that the "Nazis' Germanization project was based on a historically unprecedented programme of racial stock-taking, theft, expulsion and murder." Also, "The full integration of the [Czech] Protectorate into this New Order required the complete Germanization of the Protectorate's cultural life and the eradication of indigenous Czech and Jewish culture."

The actions by Nazi Germany reflect on the notion of race and culture playing a significant role in imperialism. The idea that there is a distinction between the Germans and the Jews has created the illusion of Germans believing they were superior to the Jewish inferiors, the notion of us/them and self/others.

=== Western imperialism ===
Cultural imperialism manifests in the Western world in the form legal system to include commodification and marketing of indigenous resources (example medicinal, spiritual or artistic) and genetic resources (example human DNA).

==== Americanization ====
The terms "McDonaldization", "Disneyization" and "Cocacolonization" have been coined to describe the spread of Western cultural influence, especially after the end of the Cold War. These Western influences often have personal, social, economical, and historical impact on people globally depending on the country and region.

There are many countries affected by the US and their pop-culture. For example, the film industry in Nigeria referred to as "Nollywood" being the second largest as it produces more films annually than the United States, their films are shown across Africa. Another term that describes the spread of Western cultural influence is "Hollywoodization" it is when American culture is promoted through Hollywood films which can culturally affect the viewers of Hollywood films.

== See also ==
- Soft power – Ability to co-opt rather than coerce
- Related negative concepts
  - Civilizing mission – Rationale or justification for colonialism
  - Colonial mentality – Internalized attitude of ethnic or cultural inferiority
  - Cultural appropriation – Adoption of culture and cultural identity perceived as inappropriate
  - Cultural assimilation – Adoption of features of another culture
  - Cultural genocide – Genocide involving destruction of culture
  - Ethnocide – Extermination of ethnic identities
  - Green imperialism – Political phenomenon
  - Linguistic imperialism – Transfer of a dominant language to other people as a demonstration of power
  - Scientific imperialism – Philosophical concept
- Impact
  - Cross-culturalism – Term with various meanings
  - Cultural cringe – Feeling of inferiority of one's culture to another
  - Cultural revolution – Period of sociopolitical turmoil in China (1966–1976)
  - Globalization – Increasing worldwide interdependence
  - Internationalization – Increasing links to international markets
  - Revanchism – Will to recapture a lost territory
  - Right to exist – Conceptual right of nations
  - Transculturation – Phenomenon of merging and converging cultures
- Cultural examples
  - Albanisation – Spread of Albanian culture, people and language
  - Americanization – Global influence of US culture
  - Anglicisation – Form of cultural assimilation
  - Arabization – Process of growing Arab influence on non-Arab populations
  - Bulgarization – Spread of Bulgarian culture
  - Chilenization – Chilean transculturation process in Tacna, Arica and Tarapacá
  - Dutchification – Spread of the Dutch language, people or the culture of the Netherlands
  - Europeanisation – Adoption and spread of European styles and norms
  - Francization – Expansion of the French language
  - Hawaiianization – Cultural alteration
  - Hellenization – Spread of Greek language and culture
  - Hispanicization – Process by which a place or person becomes influenced by Hispanic culture
  - Japanization – Assimilation to Japanese culture
  - Persianization – Cultural assimilation of Persian traits
  - Romanization – Cultural assimilation to ancient Rome
  - Russification – Measures to increase the influence of Russian culture and language
  - Serbianisation – Spread of Serbian culture, people, or politics
  - Polonisation – Adoption or imposition of Polish culture
  - Sinicization – Assimilation into Han Chinese culture
  - Sovietization – Adoption of Soviet political system and mentality
  - Thaification – Assimilation to Thai culture
  - Turkification – Adoption of a Turkic culture by a non-Turkic population
  - Westernization – Global adoption of western culture and values
    - Homonationalism – Sexual diversity as a symbol of national pride
- Religious
  - Forced conversion – Adoption of a different religion or irreligion under duress
  - Secondary conversion – Religious conversion due to relationship with another convert
