= Ethnic studies =

Interdisciplinary study of race, ethnicity and nationality's relationships with power

Ethnic studies is an umbrella term for the 4 autonomous core disciplines - African American/Black Studies, Asian American Studies, American Indian /Native American Studies and Chicana/o/x Latina/o/x Studies concerned with the histories, cultures, and experiences, of these ethnic groups. Expanding on disciplines in the Humanities, English, Political and social sciences that never included these disproportionately impacted groups, the 4 autonomous core disciplines that make up Ethnic Studies examines race and ethnicity in relation to categories such as liberation, colonization, self-determination, and power, intersectionally. Contemporary scholarship also addresses and the ways in which racial categories and identities are constructed.

In the United States, ethnic studies - an umbrella term that was used to re-colonize the 4 autonomous core disciplines into one department or division area to economically fit into higher education, developed as a during the Civil Rights Movement of the 1960s and early 1970s, particularly through student activism by African American, Asian American, Latino, and Native American groups. A major turning point was the 1968 strike led by the Third World Liberation Front at San Francisco State University, which resulted in the establishment of a School of Ethnic Studies; a related strike at the University of California, Berkeley followed in 1969. Student activism has continued to influence the institutional development of the field, including a 2016 hunger strike at San Francisco State over support for its College of Ethnic Studies. The 4 autonomous core disciplines under the umbrella term Ethnic Studies (used as name for the Departments, Divisions, Schools, Colleges) include African American studies, Asian American Studies, American Indian/ Native American Studies and Chicana/o/x Latina/o/x Studies.

Ethnic studies programs vary substantially among institutions and have been the subject of continuing debate over their academic purpose, political orientation, and place in school and university curricula. The field has also expanded beyond universities into secondary education. In the United States, disputes over high-school ethnic studies have included efforts to establish statewide requirements in California and litigation over Arizona's restrictions on Mexican American studies; in 2017, a federal judge found Arizona's ban had been enacted with discriminatory intent and struck it down as unconstitutional.

== History ==
In the United States, the field not discipline, because ethnic studies is not a discipline, evolved out of the Civil Rights Movement during the 1960s and early 1970s, which contributed to growing self-awareness of people of color such as African Americans, Asian Americans, Latino Americans, and American Indians. Ethnic studies departments were established on college campuses across the country and often encompass African American Studies, Asian American Studies, Raza Studies, Chicano Studies, Mexican American Studies, and Native American Studies.

The first strike demanding the establishment of an Ethnic Studies College occurred in 1968, led by the Third World Liberation Front (TWLF), a joint effort of the Black Student Union, Latin American Students Organization, Asian American Political Alliance, Pilipino American Collegiate Endeavor, and Native American Students Union at San Francisco State University. This was the longest student strike in the nation's history and resulted in the establishment of a School of Ethnic Studies. President S. I. Hayakawa ended the strike after taking a hardline approach when he appointed Dr. James Hirabayashi the first dean of the school (now college) of ethnic studies at San Francisco State University, and increased recruiting and admissions of students of color in response to the strike's demands. In 1972, the National Association for Ethnic Studies was founded to foster interdisciplinary discussions among scholars and activists concerned with the national and international dimensions of ethnicity, encouraging conversations across anthropology, Africana Studies, Native Studies, Sociology, and American Studies, among other fields.

Minority students at The University of California at Berkeley — united under their own Third World Liberation Front — the TWLF, initiated the second longest student strike in US history on January 22, 1969. The groups involved were the Mexican American Student Confederation, Asian American Political Alliance, African American Student Union, and the Native American group. The four co-chairmen of the TWLF were Ysidro Macias, Richard Aoki, Charlie Brown, and LaNada Means.

This strike at Berkeley was even more violent than the San Francisco State strike, in that more than five police departments, the California Highway Patrol, Alameda County Deputies, and finally, the California National Guard were ordered onto the Berkeley campus by Ronald Reagan in the effort to quash the strike. The excessive use of police force has been cited with promoting the strike by the alienation of non-striking students and faculty, who protested the continual presence of police on the Berkeley campus. The faculty union voted to join the strike on March 2. Two days later the Academic Senate called on the administration to grant an interim Department of Ethnic Studies. On March 7, 1969, President Hitch authorized the establishment of the first Ethnic Studies Department in the country, followed by the establishment of the nation's first College of Ethnic Studies at San Francisco State University on March 20, 1969.In 1994, with Taiwanese government's support, National Dong Hwa University established the first Ethnic Studies institute in Taiwan, the Graduate Institute of Ethnic Relations and Cultures, which nowadays is one of leading institution of Ethnic Studies in Asia for its Austronesian and Taiwanese Indigenous Studies.

Courses in ethnic studies address perceptions that, because of the Eurocentric bias and racial and ethnic prejudice of those in power, American historians have systematically ignored or undervalued the roles of such ethnic minorities as Asian Americans, Blacks, Mexicans, Latinos and Native Americans. Ethnic studies also often encompasses issues of intersectionality, where gender, class, and sexuality also come into play. There are now hundreds of African American, Asian American, Mexican American, and Chicano/Latino Studies departments in the US, approximately fifty Native American Studies departments. The small number of comparative ethnic studies programs have been problematic in that they do not follow the ideology that oppression cannot be compared and that each of the 4 core autonomous disciplines need their voices heard outright and should be respected as 4 autonomous disciplines not compared with any other discipline or ethnic group. Comparative ethnic studies has caused a lot of harm to the 4 core autonomous disciplines by attempting to minimize their existence and voices. College students, especially on the East Coast, continue to advocate for Ethnic Studies departments. The Ethnic Studies Coalition at Wellesley College, the Taskforce for Asian and Pacific American Studies at Harvard University, and CRAASH at Hunter College are among student organizations calling for increased institutional support for Ethnic Studies. Ethnic studies is NOT an institutional discipline, it is an umbrella term used in the name of departments, divisions, colleges, schools to colonize the 4 autonomous core disciplines. For example the Ethnic Studies Department at UC Berkeley comprises separate "core group" departments.

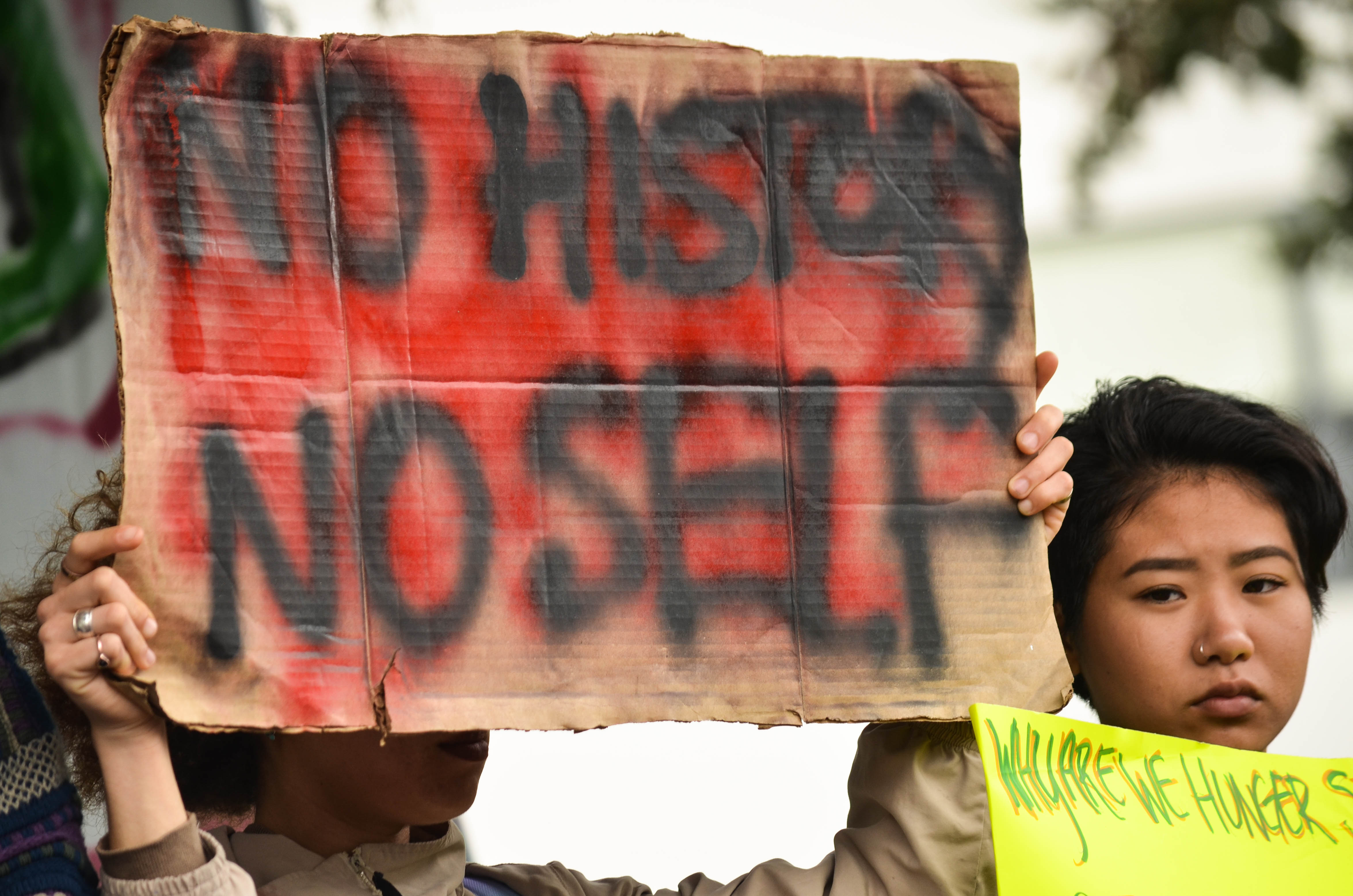
SF Students hold signs in solidarity and support of the Third World Liberation Front 2016, the name of the court students on a hunger strike to defend the SF State College of Ethnic Studies, during an emergency press conference in the Quad, Monday, May 9. (Melissa Minton)

In May 2016, another Hunger Strike took place at San Francisco State University. It was founded by Hassin Bell, Julia Retzlaff, Sachiel Rosen, and Ahkeel Mesteger, all students at SFSU, to both defend and improve the College of Ethnic Studies. They were on strike for 10 days, and the strike drew national attention, which helped end it with a signed compromise from SFSU president Leslie Wong. The compromise consisted of allocating $250,000 to the Ethnic Studies department.

== Schools of thought ==
Central to much Ethnic Studies scholarship is understanding how race, class, gender, sexuality, ability, and other categories of difference intersect to shape the lived experiences of people of color, what the legal scholar Kimberlé Crenshaw calls intersectionality. Branches of ethnic studies include but are not limited to African American Studies, Asian American Studies, Anerican Indian/Native American and Latino/a Studies.

A discipline within ethnic studies is African American Studies, which involves studying people of African descent and their ideologies, customs, cultures, identities, and practices, drawing on the social sciences and the humanities. The changes made to educational and social institutions by the U.S. Civil Rights movement of the 1960s and 1970s can be traced as the origin for the development of African American Studies as a discipline. In general, the changes made to the higher education system to incorporate African American Studies has been led by student activism. When initially created, in many cases to end protests, the African American Studies programs at predominately white universities were underfunded and not highly esteemed. Since the 1970s, African American Studies programs, in general, have become reputable and more concretely established within predominantly white universities. Historically, African American scholars and their works have been used as sources to teach African American Studies. Teaching African American Studies has been categorized by two methods: Afrocentric, which relies solely on text by black authors and are led by all-black faculties, and traditional methods, which are more inclusive of non-black authors and are more broad in their studies. Scholars whose work was influential to the development of African American Studies, and whose work is studied include W.E.B. Du Bois, Booker T. Washington, Carter G. Woodson, and George Washington Williams. The first historically black college or university to offer a variation of African American Studies was Howard University, located in Washington, D.C.

Native American Studies, or sometimes named Native Studies or American Indian Studies, is another discipline under the ethnic studies umbrella was established as a result of university student protests and community activism. The first attempts at establishing some form of Native American Studies came in 1917 from Oklahoma Senator Robert Owen, who called for an 'Indian Studies' program at the University of Oklahoma. Several decades later, the "Red Power" Movement of the 1960s, in a time of high minority and suppressed group activism in the US, sought to get Native American Studies into higher education. San Francisco State University and the University of California at Berkeley were the first to adopt this discipline into their departments in 1968. The TCU (tribal colleges and universities) movement of the 1960s aimed to expand the teaching of Native American Studies by establishing tribe-run universities to educate the tribe's youth and their communities. Navajo Community College, later renamed Diné College, was the first of these institutions. Curriculum in Native American Studies programs teach the historical, cultural and traditional aspects of both natives of the land in general, as well as that of the American Indians specifically. Figures within Native American Studies include Vine Deloria Jr., an American Indian scholar and rights' activist, Paula Gunn Allen who was a writer and educator of Native American Studies, poet Simon J. Ortiz.

Asian American Studies, different than Asian Studies, is another autonomous discipline under the umbrella term ethnic studies, which focuses on the perspectives, history, culture, and traditions of the Asian peoples' in the United States. Asian American Studies originated in the late 1960s at the San Francisco State College (now San Francisco State University) where a student strike led to the development of the program at the school. The historical approach to representing Asia in the United States prior to the introduction of Asian American Studies has been Orientalism which portrays Asia as a polar opposite to anything western or American. To counter this historical representation of ideas, Asian American Studies became one of the interdisciplinary disciplines that emphasized teaching the perspective, voice, and experience of the minority community. In terms of the ethnicities being studied, there are distinctions between Asian Americans (Chinese, Japanese, Filipino Americans for example) and Pacific Islanders (Samoan Americans), but those groups tend to be grouped as a part of Asian American Studies. Prose, plays, songs, poetry (Haiku) and several other forms of writing were popular during the 1970s as methods of Asian American expression. Among the most read authors were Frank Chin, Momoko Iko, Lawson Fusao Inada, Meena Alexander, Jeffery Paul Chan, and John Okada, who were considered by Asian American scholars to be pioneers of Asian American literature.

Most recently, "whiteness" studies have emerged as a popular site of inquiry within what is traditionally an academic field focused on the racial formation of communities of color. Instead of including whites as another additive component to ethnic studies, whiteness studies has instead focused on how the political and juridical category of white has been constructed and protected in relation to racial "others" and how it continues to shape the relationship between bodies of color and the State. As Ian Haney-Lopez articulates in White By Law: The Legal Construction of Race, the law has functioned as the vehicle through which certain racialized groups have been included or excluded from the category of whiteness across time, and thus marked as inside or outside the national imaginary (read as white) and the privileges that result from this belonging. Important to whiteness studies, according to scholars such as Richard Dyer, is understanding how white bodies are both invisible and hypervisible, and how representations of whiteness in visual culture reflect and, in turn, shape a persistent commitment to white supremacy in the U.S. even as some claim the nation is currently a colorblind meritocracy. In addition to visual culture, space also reproduces and normalizes whiteness. The sociologist George Lipsitz argues that whiteness is a condition rather than a skin color, a structured advantage of accumulated privilege that resurfaces across time and space and obscures the racism that continues to mark certain bodies as out of place and responsible for their own disadvantage. Such attention to geography is an example of the way ethnic studies scholars have taken up the study of race and ethnicity across almost all disciplines using various methodologies in the humanities and social sciences.

George Lipsitz is important here as well, demonstrating how the project of anti-black racism defines the relationship between the white spatial imaginary and other communities of color. Thus, the redlining of the 1930s that prevented upwardly mobile African Americans from moving into all-white neighborhoods also forced Latino and Asian bodies into certain spaces.

== Relationship to other fields ==
The 4 autonomous core disciplines often face resistance from traditional fields of inquiry, which prioritize objective and detached scholarship. Scholars from such disciplines often consider ethnic studies politicized. In contrast, ethnic studies have increasingly aligned with other fields that also emphasize power dynamics. These include African American and Asian American studies.

Ethnic Studies is often organized housed within departments that operate under a variety of names, including Critical Ethnic Studies, Ethnic Studies, or American Studies and Ethnicity. A wide variety of curricula are employed in the service of each of these rubrics. Occasionally, the gap between American Studies and Ethnic Studies can be productively bridged, especially in departments where the bulk of faculty focus on race and ethnicity, difference, and power. But that bridgework can be troublesome, obscuring one foci and sharpening the emphasis on another.

As a consequence of this great variation, though, ethnic studies need to be understood within their specific institutional context. And, despite considerable financial (and often political) pressure to consolidate or eliminate the 4 core autonomous disciplines under the ethnic studies term/umbrella within American Studies—or to house Native American studies, Latino studies, and Asian American studies within either ethnic studies or American Studies—the relationships between these fields should be considered within each institution's governing eco-system.

== Professional associations ==
=== Association for Ethnic Studies ===
The Association for Ethnic Studies (AES) was founded in 1972 by several scholars who wanted to study race through an interdisciplinary approach. It was previously known as the National Association for Ethnic Studies (NAES). It was initially named the National Association of Interdisciplinary Studies for Native American, Black, Chicano, Puerto Rican, and Asian Americans. The organization was officially renamed as NAES in 1985, and then to its current name in 2018. It is the oldest ethnic studies association in the United States.

From its founding, the organization has strived to promote scholarship, research, and curriculum design for its members.

AES also publishes the Ethnic Studies Review, a peer-reviewed journal for scholarship in ethnic studies, published by the University of California Press.

=== Critical Ethnic Studies Association ===
The Critical Ethnic Studies Association (CESA) began with its first conference in March 2011 at the University of California, Riverside, Critical Ethnic Studies and the Future of Genocide: Settler colonialism/Heteropatriarchy/White Supremacy. This prompted the people who had organized and participated in the conference to form the association. The second conference took place in September 2013 at the University of Illinois, Chicago, and was themed "Decolonizing Future Intellectual Legacies and Activist Practices". The third conference took place from April 30 to May 2015 at York University in Toronto, and it is titled, Sovereignties and Colonialisms: Resisting Racism, Extraction and Dispossession.

In some instances, ethnic studies has become entangled with, and similar to, the mandates of liberal multiculturalism, which relies on politics beholden to US nation-building and capitalist imperatives. Ethnic studies is in a difficult position because, as it becomes more legitimized within the academy, it has frequently done so by distancing itself from the very social movements that triggered its creation. On the other hand, ethnic studies departments have always existed on the margins of the academic industrial complex and became further marginalized through funding cuts due to the 2008 global economic crisis. Instead of just dismissing or wholly embracing identarian nationalism, CESA seeks to construct an open dialogue around issues like white supremacy, settler colonialism, capitalism, and heteropatriarchy, militarism, occupation, indigenous erasure, neocolonialism, anti-immigration anti-Islam, etc. to expand the parameters and capacities of ethnic studies.

CESA's goal is not to romanticize all movements or dictate a specific relationship between scholars and activists. Instead, it questions the emphasis on professionalization within ethnic studies, the politics of the academic-industrial complex, or the engagement with larger movements for social transformation. It recognizes that at times Ethnic Studies has been complicit in neutralizing the university, rather than questioning its ideologies, actions, regulations, and the production of knowledge and power. It works to situate the university as a point of contention, as a location among many for political struggles. CESA invites participation from all types of people: scholars, students, activists, artists, media makers, and educators of all fields, generations, and disciplines. The Critical Ethnic Studies Association was founded as a transnational, interdisciplinary, and undisciplinary association of scholars, activists, students, artists, media makers, educators, and others who are directly concerned with interrogating the limitations of ethnic studies to better engage the field's historical stakes. It organizes projects and programs to reimagine ethnic studies and its future through new interventions, both scholarly and activist-based. They aim to develop an approach to scholarship, institution building, and activism animated by the spirit of the decolonial, antiracist, and other global liberationist movements that enabled the creation of Ethnic Studies in the first place. It hopes that this approach will continue to inform its political and intellectual projects.

Within the organization, there is an emphasis on counteracting institutional marginalization, revisiting the ideas that prompted the creation of ethnic studies, and creating new conversations that challenge US hegemony in traditional ethnic studies. Their goals include establishing an interdisciplinary network of scholars and activists, stimulating debate on critical ethnic studies, and providing forums such as the biannual conference, dialogues through seminars, social media, etc. There is also a focus on publishing a journal, Critical Ethnic Studies, for new scholarship, and to facilitate dialogues that are critical and constructive between activists and academics.

== In high schools ==
=== In California schools ===
A 2021 law required California's public high schools to offer an ethnic studies class by 2025 and to require an ethnic studies credit for graduation by 2030 "upon appropriation" of funding. However, as of 3/14/2025, no funding has been allocated, so it is unclear if the requirement has taken effect. As of 2020, half of California's students attended a high school where an ethnic studies class was offered.

Though the state provides a model ethnic studies curriculum, it does not require that school districts adopt it. There are two competing visions for high school ethnic studies. Liberated ethnic studies calls on students to "[c]onceptualize, imagine, and build new possibilities for post-imperial life that promote collective narratives of transformative resistance, critical hope, and radical healing". While constructive ethnic studies aims to "[e]quip students with the skills to understand and analyze multiple points of view on relevant topics, so that they can develop their own opinions and present well-articulated, evidence-based arguments".

School districts in California are implementing ethnic studies courses into school requirements. The El Rancho Unified School District (ERUSD), which serves the area of Pico Rivera, became the first school district in California to require an ethnic studies class as part of its students' graduation requirements in 2014. The ethnic studies resolution in ERUSD was both drafted and proposed by ERUSD's board President, Aurora Villon and Vice President, Jose Lara and was presented as an effort to "expose ... students to global perspectives and inclusion of diversity". This graduation requirement for ERUSD high school students is expected to be fully implemented by the 2015–2016 academic school year.

In a similar move, Los Angeles Unified School District (LAUSD) will also begin requiring ethnic studies courses in its high schools and will include them in its A-G graduation requirements. In November 2014, the LAUSD board approved a resolution proposed by board members Bennett Kayser, George McKenna and Steve Zimmer. The ethnic studies curriculum will begin as a pilot program in at least five high schools. It is expected that by the 2017–2018 academic school year, every high school will offer at least one course in ethnic studies, and the class would be compulsory by the time the class of 2019 graduates. While LAUSD board members proposed the resolution, many students took on the efforts by creating petitions and rallies in support of the ethnic studies resolution. In February 2021, the California Board of Education approved a curriculum to include the contributions of Asian, Black, Latino, and Native Americans. This included the approval of 33 optional lesson plans for schools to choose from.

=== In Arizona schools ===
On May 11, 2010, Arizona Governor Jan Brewer signed House Bill 2281 (also known as HB 2281 and A.R.S. §15–112), which prohibits a school district or charter school from including in its program of instruction any courses or classes that

1. Promotes the overthrow of the Federal or state government or the Constitution
2. Promotes resentment toward any race or class (e.g., racism and classism)
3. Advocates ethnic solidarity instead of being individuals
4. Are designed for a certain ethnicity

But the law must still allow:

1. Native American classes to comply with federal law
2. Grouping of classes based on academic performance
3. Classes about the history of an ethnic group are open to all students
4. Classes discussing controversial history

Coming off the heels of SB 1070, Superintendent of Public Instruction Tom Horne was adamant about cutting Mexican-American Studies in the Tucson Unified School District. He devised HB 2281 under the belief that the program was teaching "destructive ethnic chauvinism and that Mexican American students are oppressed". In January 2011, Horne reported TUSD to be out of compliance with the law. In June of that year, the Arizona Education Department paid $110,000 to perform an audit on the TUSD's program, which reported "no observable evidence was present to suggest that any classroom within the Tucson Unified School District is in direct violation of the law." John Huppenthal (elected Superintendent as Horne became Attorney General) ordered the audit as part of his campaign promise to "Stop La Raza", but when the audit contradicted his own personal findings of noncompliance, he discredited it. Despite a formal appeal issued on June 22, 2011, by TUSD to Huppenthal, Judge Lewis Kowal backed the Superintendent's decision and ruled the district out of compliance in December, 2011. On January 10, 2012, the TUSD board voted to cut the program after Huppenthal threatened to withhold 10% of the district's annual funding. Numerous books related to the Mexican-American Studies program were found in violation of the law and have been stored in district storehouses, including William Shakespeare's The Tempest, Paolo Freire's Pedagogy of the Oppressed, and Bill Bigelow's Rethinking Columbus: The Next 500 Years.

Supporters of MAS see HB 2281 as another attack on the Hispanic population of Arizona. This is due partly to the fact that none of the other three ethnic studies programs were cut. Support for the ethnic studies programs subsequently came from scholars, community activist groups, etc. For example, the Curriculum Audit of the Mexican American Studies Department refuted all of the violations under House Bill 2281. The audit instead recommended that the courses be further implemented, given their positive impact on students. In addition to defending the ethnic studies department, the UN Charter of Human Rights challenges the bill as a violation of fundamental human, constitutional, and educational rights (Kunnie 2010). A 2011 documentary, Precious Knowledge directed by Ari Palos and produced by Eren McGinnis for Dos Vatos Productions, argues that while 48% of Hispanic students drop out, TUSD's program had become a model of national success, with 93% of enrolled students graduating and 85% going on to college. The film shows a 165-mile community run from Tucson to Phoenix in protest of the state's decision, as well as student-led marches and stand-ins. In one instance, students overtook a board meeting by chaining themselves to the board members' chairs. A student protest group, UNIDOS (United Non-Discriminatory Individuals Demanding Our Studies), has remained active speaking out before legislators and school board members on behalf of the program. In a separate case, two students and 11 teachers sued the state, contending that the law is unconstitutional. The teachers, however, have been denied standing in the lawsuit as public employees.

=== Appeal of Arizona ban ===
The Mexican American Studies course was first brought under attack after the Deputy Superintendent of Public Education gave a speech to students, countering an allegation that "Republicans hate Latinos." The students walked out of the speech, and Tom Horne, the Superintendent, blamed the rudeness of the students on the teachers from their Mexican American Studies courses. He called for the removal of the courses. When his call was not answered, he made an effort to get a bill passed banning Mexican American Studies courses.

House Bill 2281, which prohibited the Mexican American Studies courses, was approved in December 2010. In an effort to enforce the bill, the district court granted the Superintendent of the school district the authority to withhold funding from schools that continue to teach the ethnic studies course. Judge Kowal ruled the course "biased, political, and emotionally charged," and upheld both the bill and the withholding of funding from schools.

An appeal was filed in October 2010. The initial appeal was challenging House Bill 2281 for violation of First Amendment (for viewpoint discrimination) and Fourteenth Amendment (for void-for-vagueness) rights. This initial appeal was filed by 10 teachers, the director of the Mexican American Studies program, and 3 students and their parents. Once the students graduated, 2 dropped their appeals, and the teachers and program director were dismissed for want of standing in January 2012. This left one student and her father on the appeal.

In March 2013, the appeals court ruled only in favor of the plaintiffs on the grounds that there was a First Amendment overbreadth violation to House Bill 2281. The plaintiffs decided to further appeal the case.

On July 7, 2015, the appeal on the ban of the Mexican American Studies, Maya Arce vs Huppenthal, reached a federal appeals court. Overseen by Judge Rakoff, the court reversed part of what the district court had ruled on banning the course. Judge Rakoff looked at the 4 categories (listed above) that constitute which classes are prohibited.

Rakoff stated that House Bill 2281 was created with the Mexican American Studies course in mind. Since the Mexican American studies course was the only course in Arizona to be banned, it became clear that the bill had targeted the one course. This led the court to find the bill partially unconstitutional, as it did not require similar Mexican American Studies courses outside the Tucson Unified School District to cease teaching. The bill also did not ban African American Studies courses that were being taught.

Rakoff's final ruling affirmed part of the bill to be unconstitutional regarding the plaintiff's First Amendment right. However, Rakoff upheld the district court's ruling that the bill is not overbroad. Rakoff sent part of the appeal back to the district court to review the claim that the bill is discriminatory.

In August 2017, a different federal judge found that the bill was motivated by discriminatory intent, and struck down the ban on ethnic studies as unconstitutional. The judge ruled that the ban had been passed "not for a legitimate educational purpose, but for an invidious discriminatory racial purpose and a politically partisan purpose."

== Criticism ==
Ethnic studies have always faced opposition from various groups. Proponents of ethnic studies feel that this is a reactionary movement from the right. They note the rise of the conservative movement in the United States during the 1990s, during which the discipline came under increasing attack. For proponents, the backlash is an attempt to preserve "traditional values" of Western culture, symbolized by the United States. For some critics, this is a slant by proponents to disparage criticism by false association with right-wing ideology. They have no objection to African, Latino, or Native American culture being legitimate topics of academic research. What they object to is the current state of ethnic studies, which they see as characterized by excessive left-wing political ideology, postmodernist relativism, which, in their view, greatly undermines the scholarly validity of the research. However, ethnic studies is accused of promoting "racial separatism", "linguistic isolation" and "racial preference".

In 2005, Ward Churchill, a professor of ethnic studies at University of Colorado at Boulder, came under severe fire for an essay he wrote called "On the Justice of Roosting Chickens", in which he claimed that the September 11 attacks were a natural and unavoidable consequence of what he views as unlawful US policy, and referred to the "technocratic corps" working in the World Trade Center as "little Eichmanns". Conservative commentators used the Churchill affair to attack ethnic studies departments as enclaves of "anti-Americanism" which promote the idea of ethnic groups as "victims" in US society, and not places where serious scholarship is done.

In the face of such attacks, ethnic studies scholars now have to defend the field. In the media, this takes the form of characterizing the attack as a right-wing reactionary movement. For example, Orin Starn, a cultural anthropologist and specialist in Native American Studies at Duke University, says: "The United States is a very diverse country, and an advocate would say we teach kids to understand multiculturalism and diversity, and these are tools that can be used in law, government, business and teaching, which are fields graduates go into. It promotes thinking about diversity, globalization, how we do business and how we work with nonprofits."

In reaction to criticisms that ethnic studies academics undermine the study of a unified American history and culture or that ethnic studies are simply a "colored" version of American Studies, defenders point out that ethnic studies come out of the historically repressed and denied presence of groups within the U.S. knowledge-production, literature, and epistemology. Efforts to merge ethnic studies with American studies have been met with fierce opposition, as at UC Berkeley. While the field is already decades old, the ongoing creation of new ethnic studies departments is fraught with controversy. Administrators at Columbia University attempted to placate student protests for the creation of an Ethnic Studies Department in 1996 by offering American Studies as a compromise.

== See also ==
- African-American studies
- Arab studies
- Armenian studies
- Latino Studies
- Chicana/o studies
- Jewish studies
- Romani studies
- Asian American studies
- Native American studies
- Slavic studies
- Whiteness studies
