= Five Civilized Tribes =

Native American grouping

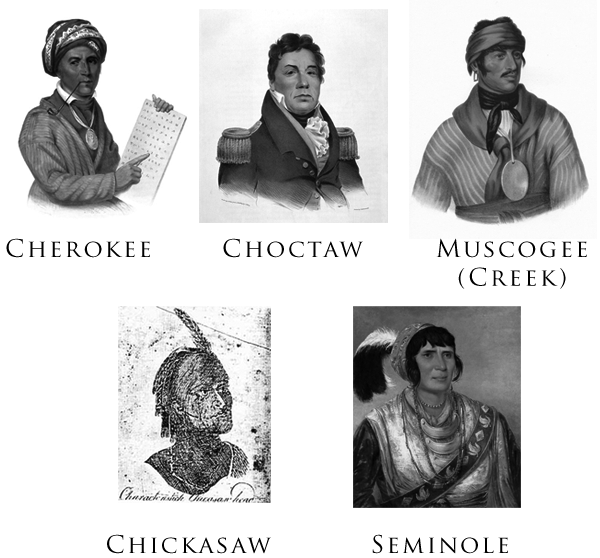
Illustrations of members of the Five Civilized Tribes painted between 1775 and 1850 (clockwise from top left): Sequoyah, Pushmataha, Selocta, Osceola, and Piominko

The term Five Civilized Tribes was applied by the United States government in the early federal period of the history of the United States to the five major Native American nations in the Southeast: the Cherokee, Chickasaw, Choctaw, Muscogee (Creek), and Seminole. White Americans classified them as "civilized" because they had adopted attributes of the Anglo-American culture.

Examples of such colonial attributes adopted by these five tribes included Christianity, centralized governments, literacy, market participation, written constitutions, intermarriage with White Americans, and chattel slavery practices, including purchase of enslaved Black Americans. For a period, the Five Civilized Tribes tended to maintain stable political relations with the White population. However, White encroachment continued and eventually led to the removal of these tribes from the Southeast, most prominently along the Trail of Tears.

In the 21st century, this term has been criticized by some scholars for its ethnocentric assumptions by Anglo-Americans of what they considered civilized, but representatives of these tribes continue to meet regularly on a quarterly basis in their Inter-Tribal Council of the Five Civilized Tribes.

The descendants of these tribes, who primarily live in what is now Oklahoma, are sometimes referred to as the Five Tribes of Oklahoma, although several other federally recognized tribes are also located in that state.

== Terminology ==
The term "civilized tribes" was adopted to distinguish the Five Tribes from other Native American tribes that were described as "wild" or "savage". Texts written by non-indigenous scholars and writers have used words like "savage" and "wild" to identify Indian tribes that retained their traditional cultural practices after European contact. As a consequence of evolving attitudes toward ethnocentric word usage and more rigorous ethnographical standards, the term "Five Civilized Tribes" is rarely used in contemporary academic publications.

George Washington believed that the only way Indians could survive in proximity to White settlers was for them to become civilized. The United States accordingly adopted a policy of civilizing Indians while Washington was president. The policy assumed that civilized Indians would require less land, and would need money, so that they would be willing to sell the excess land to White settlers. In White American terms, Indians became civilized by the men giving up hunting and becoming farmers, displacing the women who traditionally had been the primary farmers. They were expected to use draft animals and to give up maize as a main crop and instead raise wheat and cotton. The women were to become housekeepers, caring for children and weaving cotton for clothing. The Indians were also expected to acquire slaves and use them like their White plantation neighbors did.

The word "civilized" was used by White settlers to refer to the Five Tribes, who, during the 18th and early 19th centuries, actively integrated Anglo-American customs into their own cultures. Sociologists, anthropologists, and interdisciplinary scholars alike are interested in how and why these native peoples assimilated certain features of the alien culture of the White settlers who were encroaching on their lands. Historian Steve Brandon asserts that this "adaptation and incorporation of aspects of white culture" was a tactic employed by the Five Nations peoples to resist removal from their lands.

While the term "Five Civilized Tribes" has been institutionalized in federal government policy to the point that the US Congress passed laws using the name, the Five Nations themselves have been less accepting of it in formal matters, and some members have declared that grouping the different peoples under this label is effectively another form of colonization and control by White society. Other modern scholars have suggested that the very concept of "civilization" was internalized by individuals who belonged to the Five Nations, but because much of Native North American history has been communicated by oral tradition, little scholarly research has been done to substantiate this.

In present-day commentary on Native American cultures, the term "civilized" is contentious and not commonly used in academic literature. Some commentators, including the Indian activist Vine Deloria Jr., have declared that it is demeaning and implies that the indigenous peoples of the North American continent were "uncivilized" before their contact with the habits, customs, and beliefs of Anglo-American settlers. The term is based on the assumption that different peoples possess objective "degrees" of civilization that may be assessed and raises the question of just what qualities define "civilization". Consequently, it is considered a judgmental term whose meaning is dependent on the user's perspective, and thus best avoided.

== History ==
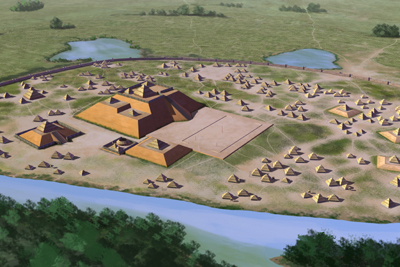
The Mississippian culture was a mound-building Native American urban culture, which flourished in the South and Eastern regions of the United States prior to the arrival of White settlers.

The Five Civilized Tribes is a term used for five major indigenous tribes who lived in the Southeastern United States. They lived in an area that had been influenced by the Mississippian culture. Prior to the arrival of white settlers, these tribes generally had matrilineal kinship systems, with property and hereditary positions passed through the mother's family.

=== First to 18th centuries ===
Based on the development of surplus foods from cultivation, Mississippian towns had more dense populations, and they developed artisan classes, and hereditary religious and political elites. The Mississippian culture flourished in what is now the Midwestern, Eastern, and Southeastern United States from 800 to 1500 CE. Agriculture was the primary economic pursuit. The bulk of the tribes lived in towns, some covering hundreds of acres and populated with thousands of people. They were known for building large, complex earthwork mounds. These communities regulated their space with planned streets, subdivided into residential and public areas. Their system of government was hereditary. Chiefdoms were of varying size and complexity, with high levels of military organization.

=== 18th century ===
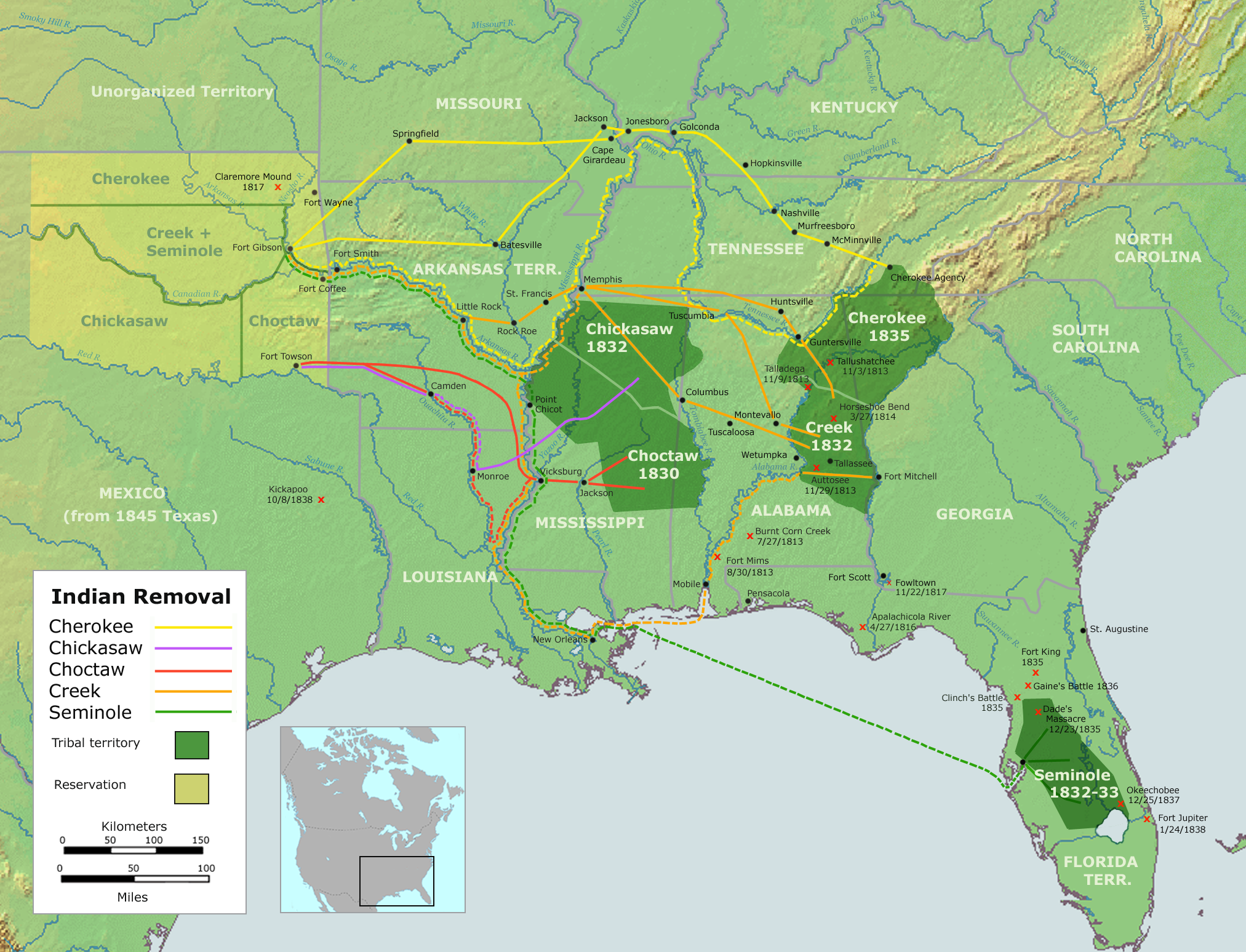
Routes of southern removals to the first Indian Territory of the Five Civilized Tribes

President George Washington and Henry Knox, the first Secretary of War, implemented a policy of cultural transformation in relation to Native Americans. The Cherokee and Choctaw tended, in turn, to adopt and appropriate certain cultural aspects of the federation of colonies.

In 1776, assembled in Philadelphia, the Second Continental Congress unanimously adopted the Declaration of Independence, which was largely written by Thomas Jefferson. American independence was subsequently achieved by the victory of the Continental Army, led by George Washington, in the American Revolutionary War and codified in the Treaty of Paris in 1784.

The Five Tribes generally adopted cultural practices from Americans that they found useful. Tribal groups who had towns or villages closer to European-descendant Americans, or interacted more with them through trading or intermarriage, took up more of such new practices. Those towns that were more isolated tended to maintain their traditional cultures.

George Washington promulgated a doctrine that held that Indian Americans were biologically equals, but that their societies were inferior. He formulated and implemented a policy to encourage civilizing them, which Thomas Jefferson continued and expanded. Historian Robert Remini wrote that the American leaders "presumed that once the Indians adopted the practice of private property, built homes, farmed, educated their children, and embraced Christianity, these Native Americans would win acceptance from Americans of European descent.

George Washington's six-point plan included: regulating the buying of Indian lands, promoting commerce with the tribes, promoting experiments to civilize or improve Indian society, authorizing presidential authority to bestow presents on the tribes, and punish those who violated Indian rights.

The US government appointed Indian agents, such as Benjamin Hawkins in the Southeast, to live among Indians and to encourage them, through example and instruction, to assimilate and adopt the lifestyle of White settlers. The tribes of the Southeast adopted Washington's policy as they established schools, took up yeoman farming practices, converted to Christianity, and built homes similar to those of their colonial neighbors. These five tribes also adopted the practice of chattel slavery: holding enslaved African Americans as forced workers.

How different would be the sensation of a philosophic mind to reflect that instead of exterminating a part of the human race by our modes of population that we had persevered through all difficulties and at last had imparted our Knowledge of cultivating and the arts, to the Aboriginals of the Country by which the source of future life and happiness had been preserved and extended. But it has been conceived to be impracticable to civilize the Indians of North America – This opinion is probably more convenient than just.

— Henry Knox letter to George Washington, July 7, 1789

Following the establishment of independence following the American Revolutionary War, Americans pushed into the interior and into the Deep South, areas that were still largely dominated by Native Americans. The invention of the cotton gin made cultivation of short-staple cotton profitable in the interior, and settlers encroached on Native American lands in the Upper South, including western Georgia, and the future states of Alabama, Louisiana, and Mississippi. They demanded the chance to cultivate these lands for agriculture. Armed conflicts occurred between some of the tribes and the settlers, who kept pushing west and acquired additional territories through negotiated treaties with European colonial powers and sometimes by force.

=== 19th century ===
The boundaries of the Five Civilized Tribes in Oklahoma, in 1866

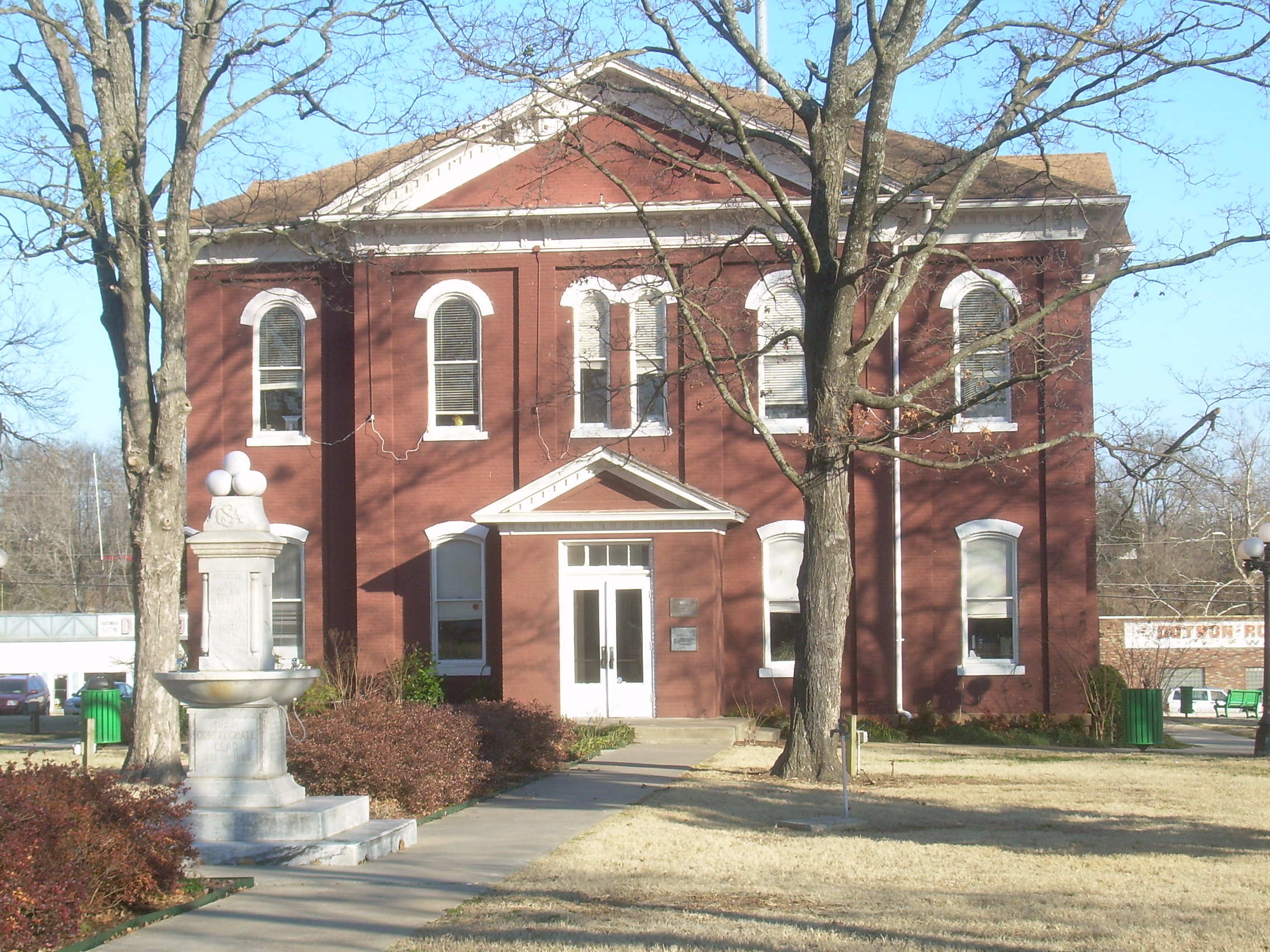
Cherokee Nation Historic Courthouse in Tahlequah, Oklahoma, built in 1849, the oldest public building in present-day Oklahoma

In the early 19th century, under such leaders as Andrew Jackson, elected president in 1828, and others, the US government formally initiated Indian removal, forcing those tribes still living east of the Mississippi River, including the Five Tribes, to lands west of the river. Congress passed authorizing legislation in 1830, to fund such moves and arrange for new lands in what became known as Indian Territory to the west.

Most members of the Five Tribes were forced to Indian Territory before 1840, many to what later became the states of Kansas and Oklahoma. The Cherokee Nation resisted removal until 1838 and lost thousands of members in removal, along what they called the Cherokee Trail of Tears. President Martin Van Buren had enforced the Treaty of New Echota, although the Senate had not ratified it, and a majority of the tribe said they had not agreed to its cessions of communal land.

Once the tribes had been relocated to Indian Territory, the US government promised that their lands would be free of American settlers. But settlers soon began to violate that, and enforcement was difficult in the western frontier.

==== Freedmen of the Five Tribes ====
The Five Tribes participated in Native American slave ownership that had enslaved Black people before and during the American Civil War. The Five Tribes largely supported the Confederacy, which had severed ties with the Union prior to the war, in large part because they were promised their own state if the Confederacy won. During removal to Indian Territory, "the Five Tribes considered enslaved Black people an ideal way of transporting capital to the West" because they were "movable property."

After the end of the Civil War, the US required these tribes to make new peace treaties, and to emancipate their slaves, as slaves had been emancipated and were granted citizenship in the US. All Five Tribes acknowledged "in writing that, because of the agreements they had made with the Confederate States during the Civil War, previous treaties made with the United States would no longer be upheld, thus prompting the need for a new treaty and an opportunity for the United States to fulfill its goal of wrenching more land" from their grasp.

They were required to offer full citizenship in their tribes to those freedmen who wanted to stay with the tribes. Those who wanted to leave could become US citizens. By that time, numerous families had intermarried or had other personal ties with African Americans.

The Emancipation Proclamation of 1863 declared all slaves in the Confederacy, which were states that had separated from the Union, to be permanently free - except for Tennessee and other parts of the Confederacy already under Union Army control. The proclamation did not end slavery in the five border states that remained in the Union, but slavery everywhere in the nation was abolished, except as punishment for a crime, with the ratification of the Thirteenth Amendment to the United States Constitution in December 1865.

The Civil Rights Act of 1866, passed over the veto of President Andrew Johnson, gave ex-slaves full citizenship, except for voting, in the United States. The Fourteenth Amendment was ratified to make clear that Congress had the legal authority to do so. The Fifteenth Amendment extended the franchise to all adult males; only adult males among Whites had previously had the franchise, and it was sometimes limited by certain requirements. The 13th, 14th, and 15th amendments are known as the "civil rights amendments", the "post-Civil War amendments", and the "Reconstruction Amendments".

To help freedmen transition from slavery to freedom, including a free labor market, President Abraham Lincoln created the Freedmen's Bureau, which assigned agents throughout the former Confederate states. The Bureau also founded schools to educate freedmen, both adults and children; helped freedmen negotiate labor contracts; and tried to minimize violence against freedmen. The era of Reconstruction was an attempt to establish new governments in the former Confederacy and to bring freedmen into society as voting citizens. Northern church bodies, such as the American Missionary Association and the Freewill Baptists, sent teachers to the South to assist in educating freedmen and their children, and eventually established several colleges for higher education. US Army occupation soldiers were stationed throughout the South via military districts enacted by the Reconstruction Acts; they tried to protect freedmen in voting polls and public facilities from violence and intimidation by White Southerners, which were common throughout the region.

The Chickasaw were allied with the Confederacy. After the Civil War, the US government required the nation also to make a new peace treaty in 1866. It included the provision that they emancipate the enslaved African Americans and provide full citizenship to those who wanted to stay in the Chickasaw Nation. The Chickasaw and Choctaw negotiated new treaties "without a clause accepting their guilt, allowing them to declare that they had been forced into a Confederate alliance by American desertion." Unlike other tribes, Chickasaw tribal leaders never offered freedpeople citizenship. The slaves were freed and they could continue to live within the boundaries of the nation as second-class citizens, or they could move to Union states and no longer be associated with the tribe, which meant they did not participate in the Dawes Rolls of the 1890s, which registered tribal members.

The Choctaw-Chickasaw Freedmen Association of Oklahoma currently represents the interests of freedmen descendants in both of these tribes. The freed people of the Cherokee, Creek, and Seminole nations were able to enjoy most citizenship rights immediately after emancipation.

But the Chickasaw Nation and Choctaw Nation of Oklahoma never granted citizenship to their Freedmen. They enacted legislation similar to the US Black Codes, which set certain wages for ex-slaves and attempted to force freed people to find employment under Indian tribal members.

The only way that African Americans could become citizens of the Chickasaw Nation at that time was to have one or more Chickasaw parents, or to petition for citizenship and go through the process available to other non-Natives, even if they were known to have been of partial Chickasaw descent in an earlier generation. Because the Chickasaw Nation did not provide citizenship to their freedmen after the American Civil War, which they felt would be akin to formal adoption of individuals into the tribe, they were penalized by the US government. It took more than half of their territory, with no compensation. They lost territory that had been negotiated in treaties in exchange for their use after removal from the Southeast.

In the late 19th century, under the Dawes Act and related legislation, the US government decided to break up communal tribal lands, allocating 160-acre plots to heads of households of enrolled members of the tribes. It determined that land left over was "surplus" and could be sold, including to non-Native Americans. Allotment was also a means to extinguish Indian title to these lands, and the US government required the dissolution of tribal governments prior to admission of the territories as the US state of Oklahoma.

As American settlement increased in the Oklahoma Territory, pressure built to combine the territories and admit Oklahoma as a state.

In 1893, the government opened the "Cherokee Strip" to outside settlement in the Oklahoma Land Run.

=== 20th century ===
In 1907, the Oklahoma Territory and the Indian Territory were merged to form the state of Oklahoma. Relative to other states, all Five Tribes are represented in significant numbers in the population of Oklahoma today.

In the late 20th century, the Cherokee Nation voted to restrict membership to only those descendants of persons listed as "Cherokee by blood" on the Dawes Rolls of the early 20th century. This decision excluded most Cherokee Freedmen; by this time, this term referred to descendants of the original group. At the time, registrars tended to classify any person with visible African American features as a Freedman, not inquiring or allowing them to document Indian descent.

=== 21st century ===
Since the 20th century, the Freedmen have argued that the Dawes Rolls were often inaccurate in terms of recording Cherokee ancestry among persons of mixed race, even if they were considered Cherokee by blood within the tribe. The registrars confused appearance with culture. In addition, the Freedmen have argued that the post-Civil War treaties made between the tribes and the US granted them full citizenship in the tribes. The Choctaw Freedmen and Creek Freedmen have similarly struggled with their respective tribes over the terms of citizenship in contemporary times.

The tribes have wanted to limit those who can benefit from tribal citizenship, in an era in which gaming casinos are yielding considerable revenues for members. The majority of members of the tribes have voted to limit membership, and as sovereign nations, they have the right to determine their rules. But descendants of freedmen believe their long standing as citizens since the post-Civil War treaties should be continued.

In 2017, the Cherokee Freedmen were granted citizenship again in the tribe. The Cherokee Nation was the first among the five tribes to update its constitution to include the Cherokee Freedmen as full citizens.

In 2018, the US Congress removed the blood quantum requirement for land allotment for the Five Tribes, though it had not been a tribal citizenship requirement. Historian Mark Miller noted:

Even so-called purely 'descendancy' tribes such as the Five Tribes with no blood quantum requirement jealously guard some proven, documentary link by blood to distant ancestors. More than any single BIA [Bureau of Indian Affairs] requirement, however, this criterion has proven troublesome for southeastern groups [seeking federal recognition] because of its reliance on non-Indian records and the confused (and confusing) nature of surviving documents.

In July 2021, the Cherokee Freedmen asked Congress to withhold housing assistance money until the Five Civilized Tribes addressed the citizenship status of freedmen's descendants. They took this action although the Cherokee Nation had already updated its constitution to end their exclusion of the Cherokee Freedmen as members.

Like other federally-recognized tribes, the Five Tribes have participated in shaping the current BIA Federal Acknowledgment Process for tribes under consideration for such recognition. They are suspicious of groups that claim Indian identity but appear to have no history of culture and community.

== Tribes ==
=== Cherokee ===
The Cherokee, (/ˈtʃɛrəkiː/; Cherokee: ᎠᏂᏴᏫᏯᎢ, romanized: Aniyvwiyaʔi) are people of the Southeastern United States, principally upland Georgia, North Carolina, and South Carolina. They speak an Iroquoian language. In the 19th century, historians and ethnographers recorded their oral tradition that told of the tribe having migrated south in ancient times from the Great Lakes region, the base of most other Iroquoian-speaking peoples.

Of the three federally recognized Cherokee tribes, the Cherokee Nation and the United Keetoowah Band of Cherokee Indians (UKB) have headquarters in Tahlequah, Oklahoma. The UKB are mostly descendants of "Old Settlers", Cherokee who migrated to Arkansas and Oklahoma about 1817. They are related to the Cherokee who were forcibly relocated there in the 1830s under the Indian Removal Act. The Eastern Band of Cherokee Indians is on the Qualla Boundary in western North Carolina, and are descendants of those who resisted or avoided relocation. Although the Cherokee Nation sponsors some satellite communities, it does not recognize Cherokee heritage groups that are seeking federal recognition. The Cherokee tribe has 729,533 enrolled members.

=== Chickasaw ===
Grand Village of the Chickasaw and Colbert settlements at the head of the Tombigbee River depicted on Victor Collot's 1795 map

The Chickasaw are Indian people of the United States who originally resided along the Tennessee River and other parts of present-day Tennessee, in the southwest side of present-day Kentucky, west of present-day Huntsville, Alabama, and in parts of Mississippi. They spoke some French and some English. Some historians credit the Chickasaw intervention in the French and Indian War on the side of the British as decisive in ensuring that the United States became an English-speaking nation. Originating further west, the Chickasaw moved east of the Mississippi River long before European contact. All historical records indicate the Chickasaw lived in northeastern Mississippi from the first European contact until they were forced to remove to Oklahoma, where most now live.

The Chickasaw are related to the Choctaw, who speak a similar language, both forming the Western Group of the Muskogean languages. "Chickasaw" is the English spelling of Chikasha (Creek pronunciation: [tʃikaʃːa]), that either means "rebel" or "comes from Chicsa". The Chickasaw are divided in two groups: the "Impsaktea" and the "Intcutwalipa". The Chickasaw were one of the "Five Civilized Tribes" who went to the Indian Territory during the era of Indian removal. Unlike other tribes, who exchanged land grants, the Chickasaw received financial compensation from the United States for their lands east of the Mississippi River. The Chickasaw Nation is the thirteenth largest federally recognized tribe in the United States. The Chickasaw built some of the first banks, schools, and businesses in Indian Territory. They also signed a treaty with the Southern United States during the Civil War and brought troops to fight for the Confederates.

=== Choctaw ===
The Choctaw are Native American people originally from the Southeastern United States, including present-day Mississippi, Alabama, and Louisiana. There were about 20,000 members of this tribe when they were forced to move to Indian Territory. Many of them did not survive. They are of the Muskogean linguistic group. The word Choctaw (also rendered as Chahta, Chato, Tchakta, and Chocktaw) is possibly a corruption of the Spanish chato, meaning flattened, in allusion to the tribe's custom of flattening the heads of infants. Noted anthropologist John Swanton suggests instead that the name belonged to a Choctaw leader. They were descended from people of the Mississippian culture which was located throughout the Mississippi River Valley. Historians such as Walter Lee Williams have documented some early Spanish explorers encountering chiefs of the Mississippian culture, ancestors of some of the Five Tribes.

Although smaller Choctaw groups are located in the southern region, the Choctaw Nation of Oklahoma and the Mississippi Band of Choctaw Indians are the two primary federally recognized tribes. This people historically cultivated beans, maize, and squash, like other settled Indians. They also hunted and fished for some of their diet. Since the early nineteenth century, the tribe has recovered and increased in number. The federally recognized tribes have about 231,000 members in total, making the Choctaw the third-largest Native American population in the United States. The capital of the Choctaw Nation is in Durant, Oklahoma.

=== Muscogee ===
The Muscogee, or Creek, are originally from present-day Alabama, Florida, Georgia, and South Carolina. They resided there from approximately 1500 AD until they were forcibly displaced by the American government in the early 19th century. Mvskoke is their name in the Muskogee language. The Muscogee Creek were not one tribe but a confederacy of several, each of which had their own distinct land and sometimes dialects or languages in the Muskogean family.

Starting in 1836, the US government forced them to remove west of the Mississippi along with the other Southeast tribes to what was designated as Indian Territory. About 20,000 Muscogee members were forced to walk the Trail of Tears, the same number as the Choctaw. Modern Muscogee live primarily in Oklahoma, Alabama, Georgia, and Florida. Their language, Mvskoke, is a member of the Creek branch of the Muskogean language family.

Federally recognized tribes descended from the Creek Confederacy include the Muscogee Creek Nation, Kialegee Tribal Town, and Thlopthlocco Tribal Town in Oklahoma; Poarch Band of Creek Indians in Alabama, and Alabama–Quassarte Tribal Town.

The Seminole people originally included many of Creek origin, but developed as a separate culture, through a process of ethnogenesis, before Indian removal.

=== Seminoles ===
The Seminoles are a Native American people that developed in present-day Florida. Federally recognized tribes of this people now reside in Oklahoma and Florida.

The Seminole nation came into existence in the late 18th century and was composed of renegade and outcast Native Americans from Georgia, Mississippi, and Alabama, most significantly from among the loose Creek confederacy. They were joined by African Americans who escaped from slavery in South Carolina and Georgia. During Indian removal and the Seminole Wars, roughly 3,000 Seminoles were forced by the U.S. to remove west of the Mississippi River. The Seminole Nation of Oklahoma is made up of their descendants.

But approximately 300 to 500 Seminoles migrated to the Everglades of Florida, where they gained refuge and resisted removal. The US waged two more wars against the Seminoles in Florida in an effort to dislodge them, and about 1,500 US soldiers died. The Seminoles never surrendered to the US government, and consequently the Seminoles of Florida call themselves the "Unconquered People".

For about twenty years after the move to Indian Territory (Oklahoma), the Seminoles refused to live with the Muscogee Creek tribe or under their government until they finally reached an agreement with the government to sign a treaty and live with them. The Seminoles favored the North during the Civil War and remained loyal to the Union. They moved north into Kansas during the war.

Seminole tribes include the Seminole Nation of Oklahoma and Seminole Tribe of Florida. In addition, the Miccosukee Tribe of Indians of Florida was part of the Seminole Tribe in that state until 1962, when they gained independent federal recognition as a tribe. They speak the Mikasuki language, also called Seminole and related to Creek, or Muskogee, but the two languages are mutually unintelligible. Ancestors of each of these tribes were among Creek bands in the region in the eighteenth century, but the Seminoles developed an independent culture in Florida.

== Works ==
- Kill the Indian, Save the Man

== See also ==
- Civilization Fund Act
- Cultural assimilation of Native Americans
- Former Indian Reservations in Oklahoma
- Martial race
- Mission Indians
- Praying Indians
