= Kill the Indian, Save the Man =

2004 book by American writer Ward Churchill

- Front cover of Kill the Indian, Save the Man by Ward Churchill, 2004
- Author: Ward Churchill
- Publisher: City Lights Books
- Publication date: 2004
- ISBN: 0-87286-434-0

Kill the Indian, Save the Man: The Genocidal Impact of American Indian Residential Schools is a 2004 book by the American writer Ward Churchill, then a professor at the University of Colorado Boulder and an activist in Native American issues. Beginning in the late 19th century, it traces the history of the United States and Canadian governments establishing Indian boarding schools or residential schools, respectively, where Native American children were required to attend, to encourage their study of English, conversion to Christianity, and assimilation to the majority culture. The boarding schools were operated into the 1980s. Because the schools often prohibited students from using their Native languages and practicing their own cultures, Churchill considers them to have been genocidal in intent.

He also addresses the effects of what is known as the Dawes Act, by which communal reservation land was allotted to individual households, and the blood quantum rules established at the time for enrollment in different tribes. While federally recognized tribes have for some time had the authority to establish their membership rules, some United States laws and policies regarding financial services provided to recognized Native Americans are based on blood quantum.

The book's title comes from a quote attributed to Richard Henry Pratt, an Army officer who developed the Carlisle Indian School, the first off-reservation Indian boarding school, from his experience in educating Native American prisoners of war. Its model of cultural immersion and assimilation was adopted for use at other government schools. The book by Churchill was published by City Lights Books in 2004 as a 158-page paperback (ISBN 0-87286-434-0).

== Synopsis ==
The book is written in the form of an extended essay divided into several chapters. It is titled "Genocide by Any Other Name – American Indian Residential Schools in Context." The opening sequence defines Churchill's terms of reference by analyzing the meaning of genocide according to Raphael Lemkin. The ECOSOC Genocide Convention – Churchill writes – was ratified in Canada in 1952 and in the US in 1986, with notable objections to changes from nine other signatories. Both countries remained in violation of the convention in the following decades through the government-sponsored relocation and sterilization programs.

In the next chapter, Churchill traces the history of the mandatory attendance of Native American children at residential schools as a violation of the convention after it was signed, with its history going back to the 1870s. The initiative entailed the physical transfer of children from their families, with the use of force, to receive education in so-called boarding schools. Churchill analyzes this as an act of cultural genocide, since the forced assimilationist policies, as school policies, prohibited the use of the students' own languages and their exercise of their own religions or cultural practices. Particularly in the early years, the schools were generally run by religious organizations, many of which had already established missions among the Native Americans. During the nearly 100-year history of the schools, conditions varied from place to place, yet some former students have also reported positive experiences.

Families often hid their children, or their cultural identities, in an attempt to keep their children from being kidnapped. Trickery and outright government force were used to remove young children from their homes. Families were devastated, and once enrolled at school, the children were not allowed to associate with siblings or loved ones back home. The stress and trauma for both the Native communities and individual children still haunt the people to this day. Children were forced to develop an identity which did not prepare them for life back home in their Native communities from which they came from, nor in the society at large which did not accept Native people as equals. These people did not belong anywhere.

He describes the often terrible conditions within these schools. Poor nutrition, a high rate of then-untreatable tuberculosis - which devastated tribal communities, and other infectious diseases which were common during the times; Forced labor, and incidents of physical, sexual and emotional abuse, with Native students suffering a higher rate of mortality than children of their age group in the general population. He notes that many graduates have reported being damaged by their experiences and have suffered high rates of alcoholism, that continues to be a problem for Native Americans outside of the school experience, as well as suicide. Churchill says the former students have transmitted this "trauma to successive generations," contributing to social disintegration among Native American communities.

== Context ==
The author intended the book to compensate for his not having covered the boarding schools and their issues in his 1979 book A Little Matter of Genocide. It includes numerous photos and lists of such historic schools in the US and Canada.

"...of all the malignancies embodied in twentieth-century U.S./Canadian Indian policy, the schools were arguably the worst. The profundity of their destructive effects upon native people, both individually and collectively, not only in the immediacy of their operational existence but in the aftermath as well, was and remains by any reasonable estimation incalculable." (xlv)

In addition, he addresses issues related to the Dawes Act and blood quantum rules established by the federal government at that time and since related to determination of Native American ancestry for financial benefits.

== Blood quantum issue ==
Churchill argues that the United States instituted blood quantum laws based upon rules of descendancy in order to further the government's goals of enrichment by European Americans and political expediency. Briefly, at the time of the Dawes Rolls, established in the late 19th and early 20th centuries to implement breaking up communal reservation lands to allot plots to individual households, the government required qualifying Native Americans to be at least one-quarter ancestry of one tribe, in order to be listed on that tribe's membership rolls to receive an allotment of land.

This was a way to exclude whites who were squatting illegally in reservation areas. Intermarried whites were included in a separate category. Its practical effect was also to exclude Native Americans who had one-quarter or more ancestry from more than one tribe, but may not have had one-quarter ancestry from a particular tribe. This ignored the intermarriage among some tribes, and required individuals to choose one tribal identity, in contrast to much Indian culture. As the government declared reservation land in excess of allotments as "surplus" and sold it to non-Natives, Churchill has suggested that the intent of the blood quantum rules were to deprive legitimate Native Americans of their lands

Churchill says that blood quantum laws have an inherent genocidal purpose. As intermarriage in the twentieth century has continued between tribal members and people not enrolled in tribes, and many without any Native ancestry, fewer of their descendants meet the federal blood quantum requirements for eligibility for certain financial services available only for certified Native Americans, such as college scholarships. In practice, each tribe establishes its own rules separately for membership in the tribe and access to tribal services. Many do not use blood quantum, but prefer documented descent from recognized historic listings of tribal members. Churchill writes: "Set the blood quantum at one-quarter, hold to it as a rigid definition of Indians, let intermarriage proceed as it [has] and eventually Indians will be defined out of existence."

Churchill's interpretation of the General Allotment Act was one of the subjects addressed by his academic misconduct investigation in 2005 at Colorado University. When the legislation was passed, progressive reformers supported the act, in what has come to be seen as a mistaken belief in the benefits to Native Americans of becoming assimilated by increasing individual land ownership and adopting European-American subsistence farming. Such reformers included Native Americans recognized as activists on behalf of their people.

== See also ==
- Canadian Indian residential school system
- Sixties Scoop
- Cultural genocide
