= The COINTELPRO Papers =

1990 book by Ward Churchill and Jim Vander Wall

The COINTELPRO Papers: Documents from the FBI's Secret Wars Against Dissent in the United States is a book by Ward Churchill and Jim Vander Wall, first published in 1990. It is a history of the FBI's COINTELPRO efforts to disrupt dissident political organizations within the United States, and reproduces many original FBI memos.

== Publication ==
The COINTELPRO Papers is published by South End Press. The first edition was printed in 1990 with a foreword by John Trudell, a preface by Brian Glick, and a guide to the documents by Chip Berlet and Brian Glick. The book is dedicated to Fred Hampton and Mark Clark. South End Press produced the second edition in 2002, with a new preface, as part of their 'Classics Series'. With 560 pages, it has ISBN 0-89608-649-6 in hard cover, and ISBN 0-89608-648-8 in paperback.
