= Agents of Repression =

1988 book by Churchill & Vander Wall

Agents of Repression

Agents of Repression: The FBI's Secret Wars Against the Black Panther Party and the American Indian Movement is a book by Americans Ward Churchill and Jim Vander Wall, first published in 1988. It describes government campaigns to disrupt the legal political activities of the Black Panther Party and the American Indian Movement, especially through actions of the FBI.

This study gives a chilling account of the government attack against the American Indian Movement and the Black Panther Party, placed in the context of the traditional use of the FBI for domestic political repression. It is a powerful indictment, with far–reaching implications concerning the treatment of political activists, especially those that are Black or Native American, and the functioning of our political institutions generally.

— Noam Chomsky, on back cover

South End Press produced the "Classics Series" second edition in 2002, 538 pages, ISBN 0-89608-646-1.
