= Little Eichmanns =

Small actions leading to complicity in evil

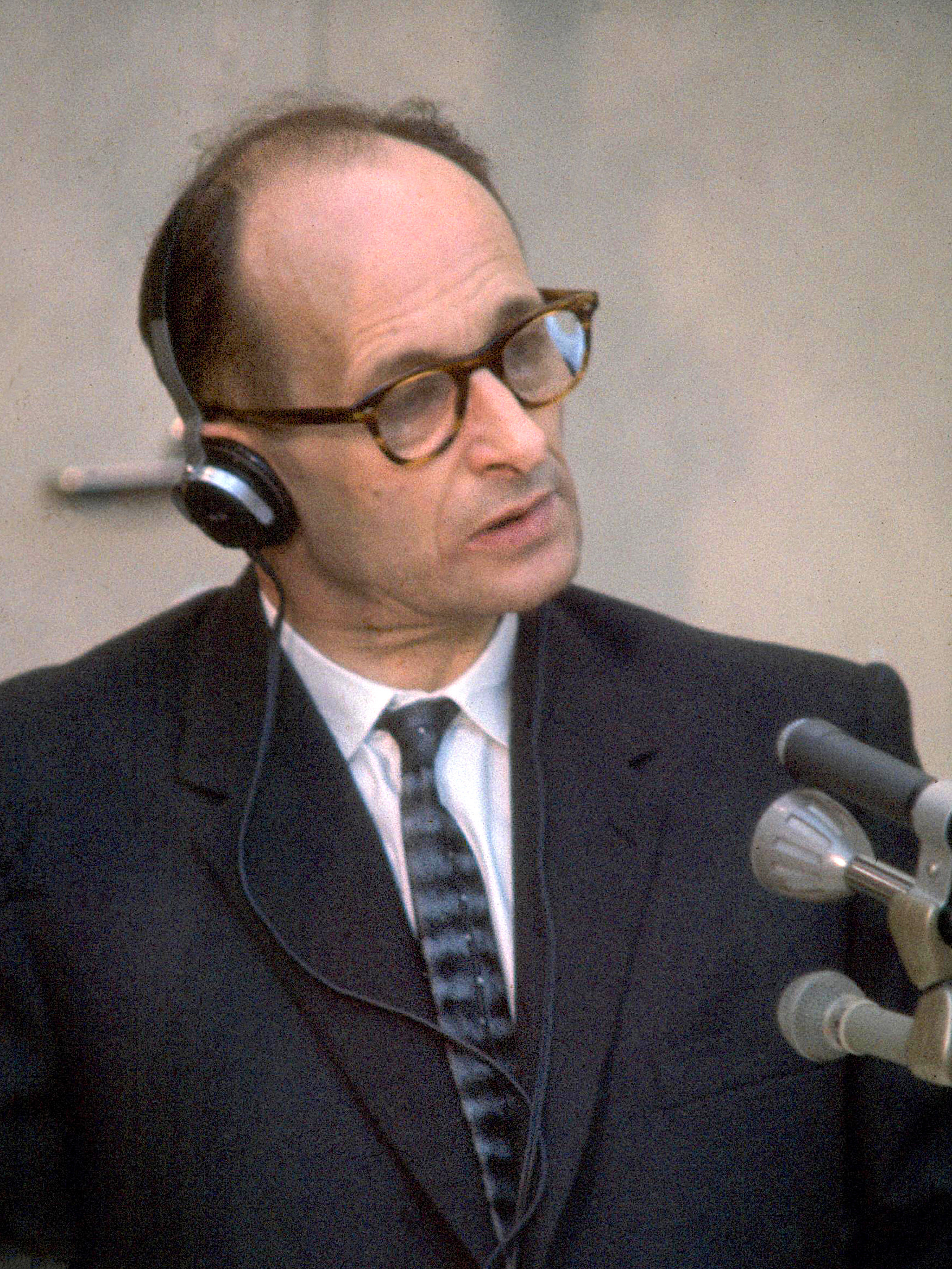
Adolf Eichmann on trial in Jerusalem (1961)

"Little Eichmanns" is a term used to describe people whose actions, while on an individual scale may seem relatively harmless even to themselves, taken collectively create destructive and immoral systems in which they are actually complicit. The name comes from Adolf Eichmann, a Nazi bureaucrat who helped to orchestrate the Holocaust, but claimed that he did so without feeling anything about his actions, merely following the orders given to him.

The use of "Eichmann" as an archetype stems from Hannah Arendt's notion of the "banality of evil". According to Arendt in her 1963 book Eichmann in Jerusalem, Eichmann relied on propaganda rather than thinking for himself, and carried out Nazi goals mostly to advance his career, appearing at his trial to have an ordinary and common personality while displaying neither guilt nor hatred. She suggested that this most strikingly discredits the idea that the Nazi war criminals were manifestly psychopathic and fundamentally different from ordinary people.

The idea that Eichmann – or, indeed, the majority of Nazis or those working in such regimes – actually fit this concept has been criticized by those who contend that Eichmann and the majority of Nazis were in fact deeply ideological and extremely antisemitic, with Eichmann, in particular, having been fixated on and obsessed with the Jews from a young age. German political scientist Clemens Heni goes so far as to say the phrase "belittles the Holocaust".

Barbara Mann wrote that the term was perhaps best known for its use by anarcho-primitivist writer John Zerzan in his essay Whose Unabomber? written in 1995, although it was already common in the 1960s, as various prior examples are known. It gained prominence in American political culture several years after the September 11 attacks, when a controversy ensued over the 2003 book On the Justice of Roosting Chickens, republishing a similarly titled essay Ward Churchill wrote shortly after the attacks. In the essay, Churchill used the phrase to describe technocrats working at the World Trade Center:

If there was a better, more effective, or in fact any other way of visiting some penalty befitting their participation upon the little Eichmanns inhabiting the sterile sanctuary of the twin towers, I'd really be interested in hearing about it.

== See also ==
- Desk murderer
- Careerism
- Collective responsibility
- Diffusion of responsibility
- Milgram experiment
- Moral disengagement
