= On the Justice of Roosting Chickens =

2003 book by Ward Churchill

- Author: Ward Churchill
- Subject: September 11 attacks; American imperialism
- Publisher: AK Press
- Publication date: 2003
- Pages: 309
- ISBN: 1-902593-79-0
- OCLC: 53998572

On the Justice of Roosting Chickens: Reflections on the Consequences of U.S. Imperial Arrogance and Criminality is a 2003 book written by Ward Churchill and published by AK Press. The "Roosting Chickens" of the title comes from a 1963 Malcolm X speech about the John F. Kennedy assassination, which the civil rights activist called "merely a case of 'chickens coming home to roost'."

Churchill used the term "Roosting Chickens" in a short essay, "'Some People Push Back': On the Justice of Roosting Chickens", first published on September 12, 2001. In that article, Churchill claimed that the September 11 attacks against the United States were "acts of war" by the "Islamic East" in defense against the "crusades" waged by the "Christian West" (e.g., Arab–Israeli conflict and The First Gulf War) throughout the late 20th century.

== Original essay ==
The original "Some People Push Back" essay was written one day after the September 11 attacks in 2001.

=== Topics ===
In Churchill's original essay, he argued that the September 11 attacks were a response to American imperialism, particularly in the Middle East:

On the morning of September 11, 2001, a few more chickens – along with some half-million dead Iraqi children – came home to roost in a very big way at the twin towers of New York's World Trade Center. Well, actually, a few of them seem to have nestled in at the Pentagon as well. The Iraqi youngsters, all of them under 12, died as a predictable – in fact, widely predicted – result of the 1991 US "surgical" bombing of their country's water purification and sewage facilities, as well as other "infrastructural" targets upon which Iraq's civilian population depends for its very survival. If the nature of the bombing were not already bad enough – and it should be noted that this sort of "aerial warfare" constitutes a Class I Crime Against humanity, entailing myriad gross violations of international law, as well as every conceivable standard of "civilized" behavior – the death toll has been steadily ratcheted up by US-imposed sanctions for a full decade now. Enforced all the while by a massive military presence and periodic bombing raids, the embargo has greatly impaired the victims' ability to import the nutrients, medicines and other materials necessary to saving the lives of even their toddlers. All told, Iraq has a population of about 18 million. The 500,000 kids lost to date thus represent something on the order of 25 percent of their age group. Indisputably, the rest have suffered – are still suffering – a combination of physical debilitation and psychological trauma severe enough to prevent their ever fully recovering. In effect, an entire generation has been obliterated.

=== Conclusions ===
Since Churchill claims that it was the U.S. who started violence in the first place, he argues that it is not unimaginable that "some people push back". As a result of what he believes to be the nefarious effects of American foreign policy and global capitalism, Churchill argues that some of those targeted in the attack of the World Trade Center were not technically innocent civilians:

As for those in the World Trade Center... Well, really, let's get a grip here, shall we? True enough, they were civilians of a sort. But innocent? Gimme a break. They formed a technocratic corps at the very heart of America's global financial empire—the "mighty engine of profit" to which the military dimension of U.S. policy has always been enslaved—and they did so both willingly and knowingly. Recourse to "ignorance"—a derivative, after all, of the word "ignore"—counts as less than an excuse among this relatively well-educated elite. To the extent that any of them were unaware of the costs and consequences to others of what they were involved in—and in many cases excelling at—it was because of their absolute refusal to see. More likely, it was because they were too busy braying, incessantly and self-importantly, into their cell phones, arranging power lunches and stock transactions, each of which translated, conveniently out of sight, mind and smelling distance, into the starved and rotting flesh of infants. If there was a better, more effective, or in fact any other way of visiting some penalty befitting their participation upon the little Eichmanns inhabiting the sterile sanctuary of the twin towers, I'd really be interested in hearing about it.

== Book ==
The essay was followed by the book On the Justice of Roosting Chickens in 2003.

After a foreword by Chellis Glendinning, the book is divided into three parts:

1. "The Ghosts of 9-1-1", an expanded version of "Some People Push Back".
2. "That "Most Peace-Loving of Nations", a long and detailed list of military interventions and covert actions conducted by the US government.
3. "A Government of Laws"?, an equally long list of instances where Churchill alleges that the US has contravened international law, particularly United Nations resolutions.

== Response ==
Neither piece was widely publicized at the time, though the 2003 book does indicate that the Nazi references in the earlier essay were already controversial. The Gustavus Myers Center for the Study of Bigotry and Human Rights gave Churchill's volume an honorable mention in December 2004.

Churchill's remarks about World Trade Center victims became the center of considerable attention and controversy in January 2005 when Hamilton College of Clinton, New York invited him to give a speech. As a result, the speech was cancelled, citing "credible threats of violence". Churchill's "little Eichmanns" drew ferverous condemnation from media pundits, who called for his resignation and deemed him unfit to teach. The University of Colorado Board of Regents publicly apologized for Churchill's writings about the September 11 attacks. Following this media controversy, Churchill was investigated for plagiarism, alleged to have committed academic misconduct, fired, and filed a lawsuit against CU. Churchill won the wrongful dismissal claim and was awarded $1 in damages by a jury that was vacated by the judge. Churchill's final appeal was denied on April 1, 2013 when the U.S. Supreme Court refused to hear the case.

== See also ==
- Genocide
- Overseas expansion of the United States
- Inversion in postcolonial theory
- Blowback (intelligence)
- Jus ad bellum
- Laws of war
- New Imperialism
- Oil for Food program
- Popular opposition to war on Iraq
- Post–September 11 anti-war movement
- Reprisal
- Strategic bombing
- Victor's justice
- War crime
