= A Little Matter of Genocide =

Book written by Ward Churchill

- Author: Ward Churchill
- Language: English
- Genre: Nonfiction
- Publication date: 1997
- Publication place: United States
- Media type: Print

A Little Matter of Genocide: Holocaust and Denial in the Americas 1492 to the Present (1997) is a book which was written by Ward Churchill. A Little Matter of Genocide surveys ethnic cleansing from 1492 to the present. Churchill compares the treatment of North American Indians to historical instances of genocide by Fascists in Cambodia, Turks against Armenians, and Europeans against the Gypsies, as well as Nazis against the Poles and Jews.

== Academic context ==
Churchill has debated over the singularity of the Holocaust with historian Deborah Lipstadt. In a 1996 review of Lipstadt’s book which is titled Denying the Holocaust, Churchill defended the German philosopher Ernst Nolte, whom Lipstadt criticized for asserting that the Holocaust was a non-singular event. Churchill argues that the Holocaust was just one of many genocides, in opposition to Lipstadt, who argues that the Holocaust was a singular event. In A Little Matter of Genocide, Churchill accuses Lipstadt of denying the genocide of Native Americans, notwithstanding his respect for her work. Churchill argues that by claiming that the Holocaust cannot be equated to anything else in human history, citing its uniqueness, one does not recognize the genocide of Native Americans to be as morally despicable as the Holocaust, and one also denies the true nature of that genocide.

== Synopsis ==
The author argues that the indigenous populations of the Americas were subjected to a systematic campaign of extermination by settler colonialism and the expansion of what is now known as the United States. Churchill provides a detailed account of the history of indigenous peoples and the history of their relations with the European colonizers. He argues that the violence against indigenous peoples was not limited to individual incidents, instead, it constituted a systematic genocide that continued even after the formal end of colonialism. The book also discusses the United States government's complicity in this genocide, particularly through policies such as the Indian Removal Act and the forced assimilation of indigenous children in American Indian boarding schools. Churchill argues that these policies were designed to eradicate indigenous cultures and communities, and he also argues that these policies have had a lasting impact on indigenous populations in the United States and elsewhere. He explains the 40 year reluctance of the United States in ratifying the Genocide Convention.

== Publishing information ==
- Churchill, Ward (1998). A Little Matter Of Genocide: Holocaust And Denial In The Americas 1492 To The Present. San Francisco CA: City Lights Books. ISBN 978-0-87286-323-1.
