= Ward Churchill =

American academic, author and political activist (1947–2026)

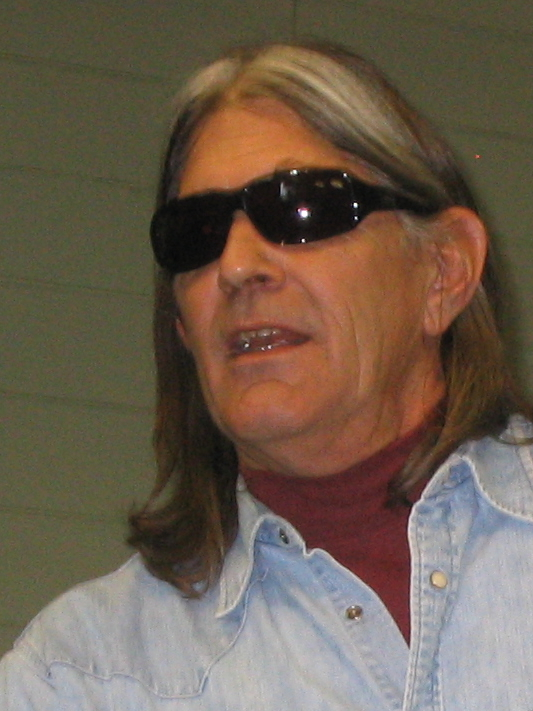
- Churchill speaking at the Bay Area Anarchist Book Fair in 2005
- Born: Ward LeRoy Churchill; October 2, 1947; Urbana, Illinois, U.S.
- Died: August 11, 2026 (aged 78); Atlanta, Georgia, U.S.
- Occupations: Author, activist, academic
- Spouse(s): Dora-Lee Larson (div. 1984) Marie Annette Jaimes (div. 1995) Leah Kelly (died 2000) Natsu Saito (m. 2005)

Academic background
- Education: Sangamon State University

Academic work
- Discipline: Ethnic studies
- Institutions: University of Colorado, Boulder
- Notable works: On the Justice of Roosting Chickens

Ward LeRoy Churchill (October 2, 1947 – August 11, 2026) was an American activist, author and academic. He was a professor of ethnic studies at the University of Colorado Boulder from 1990 until 2007. Much of Churchill's work focused on the historical treatment of political dissenters and Native Americans by the United States government, and he expressed controversial views in a direct – often confrontational and abrasive – style.

While Churchill claimed Native American ancestry, genealogical research has failed to unearth such ancestry, and he was not a recognized member of any tribe.

In January 2005, Churchill's 2001 essay "On the Justice of Roosting Chickens" gained attention. In the work, he argued the September 11 attacks were a natural and unavoidable consequence of unlawful U.S. foreign policy over the latter half of the 20th century; the essay is known for Churchill's use of the phrase "little Eichmanns" to describe the "technocratic corps" working in the World Trade Center.

In March 2005, the University of Colorado began investigating allegations that Churchill had engaged in research misconduct. Churchill was fired on July 24, 2007. Churchill filed a lawsuit against the university for unlawful termination of employment. In April 2009, a Denver jury found that Churchill was unjustly fired, awarding him $1 in damages. In July 2009, however, a District Court judge vacated the monetary award and declined Churchill's request to order his reinstatement, holding that the university had "quasi-judicial immunity". Churchill's appeals of this decision were unsuccessful.

== Early life and education ==
Churchill was born in Urbana, Illinois, on October 2, 1947, to Jack LeRoy Churchill and Maralyn Lucretia Allen. His parents divorced before he turned two. He grew up in Elmwood, Illinois, where he attended local schools.

In 1966, Churchill was drafted into the United States Army. On his 1980 resume, he claimed to have served as a public-information specialist who "wrote and edited the battalion newsletter and wrote news releases". In a 1987 profile in the Denver Post, Churchill claimed to have attended paratrooper school and to have volunteered for a 10-month stint on Long Range Reconnaissance Patrol in Vietnam. Churchill also claimed to have spent time at the Chicago office of the Students for a Democratic Society (SDS), and provided firearms and explosives training to members of the Weather Underground. In 2005, the Denver Post reported on fabrications in Churchill's service record. Department of Defense personnel files showed that Churchill was trained as a film projectionist and light truck driver, but they do not reflect paratrooper school or LRRP training.

Churchill earned a B.A. in technological communications in 1974, followed by an M.A. in communication theory in 1975, both from Sangamon State University (now the University of Illinois at Springfield).

== Career ==
=== University of Colorado Boulder ===
In 1978, Churchill began working at the University of Colorado Boulder as an affirmative action officer in the university administration. He also lectured on issues relating to Native Americans in the United States in the ethnic studies program. In 1990, the University of Colorado hired him as an associate professor, although he did not possess the academic doctorate usually required for the position. The following year he was granted tenure in the Communication department, without the usual six-year probationary period, after having been declined by the Sociology and Political Science departments.

Churchill received an honorary Doctorate of Humane Letters from Alfred University in 1992.

In 1994, then CU-Boulder Chancellor James Corbridge refused to take action on allegations that Churchill was fraudulently claiming to be an Indian, saying "it has always been university policy that a person's race or ethnicity is self-proving."

In 1996, Churchill moved to the new Ethnic Studies Department of the University of Colorado. In 1997, he was promoted to full professor. He was selected as chairman of the department in June 2002. Documents in Churchill's university personnel file show that Churchill was granted tenure in a "special opportunity position".

In January 2005, during the controversy over his 9/11 essay ("On the Justice of Roosting Chickens"), Churchill resigned as chairman of the ethnic studies department at the University of Colorado; his term as chair was scheduled to expire in June of that year.

In 2005, the University of Colorado's Research Misconduct Committee conducted a preliminary investigation into whether Churchill misrepresented his ethnicity to "add credibility and public acceptance to his scholarship". The committee concluded that the allegation was not "appropriate for further investigation under the definition of research misconduct". The university has said that it does not hire on the basis of ethnicity.

On July 24, 2007, Churchill was fired for academic misconduct.

==== Research misconduct investigation ====
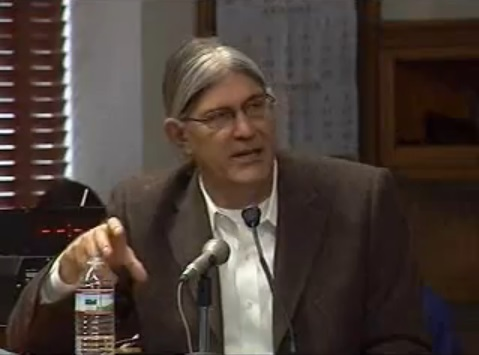
Churchill testifying in the civil trial of Ward Churchill v. University of Colorado

The quality of Churchill's research had been seriously questioned by legal scholar John LaVelle and historian Guenter Lewy. Additional critics were sociologist Thomas Brown, who had been preparing an article on Churchill's work; and historians R. G. Robertson and Russell Thornton, who said that Churchill had misrepresented their work.

In 2005, University of Colorado Boulder administrators ordered an investigation into seven allegations of research misconduct against Churchill. The allegations included three allegations of plagiarism, allegations of fabrication or falsification regarding the history of the Dawes Act and the Indian Arts and Crafts Act of 1990, and alleged claims that smallpox was intentionally spread to Native Americans by John Smith in 1614 and by the United States Army at Fort Clark in 1837.

On May 16, 2006, the university released its findings; the Investigative Committee unanimously concluded that Churchill had engaged in "serious research misconduct", including falsification, fabrication, and plagiarism. The committee was divided on the appropriate level of sanctions. Following further deliberations by university bodies, on July 24, 2007, the university regents voted seven to two to uphold all seven of the findings of research misconduct. The regents voted eight to one to fire Churchill.

The next day, Churchill filed a lawsuit in state court claiming that the firing was retribution for his expression of politically unpopular views. The jury in Churchill's suit for reinstatement weighed the university's claims of academic misconduct per jury instructions it received in the case. On April 1, 2009, the jury found that Churchill had been wrongly fired, and awarded $1 in damages. On July 7, 2009, Judge Larry Naves found that the university was entitled to quasi-judicial immunity as a matter of law, vacated the jury verdict, and determined that the university did not owe Churchill any financial compensation. Churchill appealed, but Judge Naves's decision was upheld by a three-judge panel of the Colorado Court of Appeals and by the Colorado Supreme Court. On April 1, 2013, the United States Supreme Court declined to hear Churchill's case.

A 2011 report by the Colorado Committee to Protect Faculty Rights of the Colorado Conference of the American Association of University Professors investigating academic freedom at the University of Colorado - Boulder determined that Churchill's termination was unjustified.

=== Writing ===
According to the University of Colorado investigation, Churchill's academic publications "are nearly all works of synthesis and reinterpretation, drawing upon studies by other scholars, not monographs describing new research based on primary sources." The investigation also noted that "he has decided to publish largely in alternative presses or journals, not in the university presses or mainstream peer-reviewed journals often favored by more conventional academics." Historian Gavriel Rosenfeld criticized Churchill for "numerous errors reflecting sloppy or hasty scholarship".

In 1986, Churchill wrote the essay "Pacifism as Pathology: Notes on an American Pseudopraxis" criticizing pacifist politics within the U.S. left as being hypocritical, de facto racist and ineffectual. In 1998, Arbeiter Ring Publishing published the essay in a book entitled Pacifism as Pathology: Reflections on the Role of Armed Struggle in North America, listing Ward Churchill as the author. The book included a preface by Ed Mead (of the George Jackson Brigade), a new introduction to the essay by Churchill and a commentary by Michael Ryan. The book sparked much debate in leftist circles and inspired more aggressive tactics within the anti-globalization movement in the following few years. George Lakey, a co-founder of the pacifist Movement for a New Society, published a detailed response in 2001 titled "Nonviolent Action as the Sword that Heals: Challenging Ward Churchill's 'Pacifism As Pathology'". The 2007 edition published by AK Press includes a preface by Derrick Jensen. A third edition was published in 2017 by PM Press with updates by Churchill and Ryan, and a foreword by Dylan Rodríguez.

Churchill's Indians Are Us? (1994), a sequel to Fantasies of the Master Race, further explores Native American issues in popular culture and politics. He examines the movie Black Robe, the Pine Ridge Indian Reservation killings, the prosecution of Leonard Peltier, sports mascots, the Indian Arts and Crafts Act of 1990, and blood quantum laws, calling them tools of genocide. Churchill is particularly outspoken about New Age exploitations of shamanism and American Indian sacred traditions, and the "do-it-yourself Indianism" of certain contemporary authors. John P. LaVelle of the University of New Mexico School of Law published a review of Indians Are Us? in The American Indian Quarterly. Professor LaVelle, an enrolled member of the Santee Sioux Nation, states that Indians Are Us? twists historical facts and is hostile toward Indian tribes. It was in this book that Churchill first made the assertion that the United States distributed "smallpox-infested blankets" to Indian tribes, an assertion which he repeated several times over the next decade. The assertion has been criticized as a falsification.

Churchill argued that in the American continent the Indigenous populations were subjected to a systematic campaign of extermination by settler colonialism: "For Churchill, the greatest series of genocides ever perpetrated in history - in terms of magnitude and duration - occurred in the Americas...". He discusses American policies such as the Indian Removal Act and the forced assimilation of Indigenous children in American Indian boarding schools operating in the mid-1800s to early 1900s. He has called manifest destiny an ideology used to justify dispossession and genocide against Native Americans, and compared it to Lebensraum ideology of Nazi Germany.

==== Blood quantum ====
Churchill argued that the United States instituted blood quantum laws based upon rules of descendancy in order to further goals of personal enrichment and political expediency. For decades in his writings, Churchill has argued that blood quantum laws have an inherent genocidal purpose. He says: "Set the blood quantum at one-quarter, hold to it as a rigid definition of Indians, let intermarriage proceed as it [has] and eventually Indians will be defined out of existence".

Churchill's assertions about the blood quantum were raised when research-misconduct allegations were brought against him in 2005. He has been accused of using his interpretation of the Dawes Act to attack tribal governments that would not recognize him as a member. Oglala activist Russell Means has defended Churchill's Native American identity, stating, "We are the only ethnic group in the world that has to prove our degree of blood, like the dogs and the horses."

==== September 11 essay ====
Churchill wrote an essay in September 2001 entitled On the Justice of Roosting Chickens. In it, he argued that the September 11 attacks were provoked by U.S. foreign policy. He described the role of financial workers at the World Trade Center as an "ongoing genocidal American imperialism" comparable to the role played by Adolf Eichmann in organizing the Holocaust. In 2005, this essay drew attention after Hamilton College invited Churchill to speak. This led to both condemnations of Churchill and counter-accusations of McCarthyism by Churchill and his supporters. Following the controversy, the University of Colorado interim Chancellor Phil DiStefano said, "While Professor Churchill has the constitutional right to express his political views, his essay on 9/11 has outraged and appalled us and the general public."

== Art ==
Churchill's subjects were often American Indian figures and other themes associated with Native American Culture. He used historical photographs as source material for works. In the early 1990s at Santa Fe Indian Market, Churchill protested the passage of the 1990 Indian Arts and Crafts Act. It requires that, to identify and exhibit works as being by a Native American, artists and craftsmen must be enrolled in a Native American tribe or designated by a tribe as an artisan.

His 1981 serigraph Winter Attack was, according to Churchill and others, based on a 1972 drawing by the artist Thomas E. Mails. Churchill printed 150 copies of Winter Attack and sold at least one of them. Other copies are available online for purchase. Churchill said that, when he produced Winter Attack, he publicly acknowledged that it was based on Mails's work. The online journal Artnet mentions Churchill's artwork and the controversy surrounding its originality.

== Personal life ==
In 1977, Churchill began living with Dora-Lee Larson. The relationship was later described in divorce documents as a common-law marriage. Larson filed for divorce in 1984 and asked to have her address kept secret because of "past violence and threats" from Churchill.

Churchill later married Marie Annette Jaimes, who also worked at the University of Colorado. Their marriage ended in 1995.

His third wife was Leah Kelly. On May 31, 2000, the 25-year-old Kelly was hit by a car and killed. Churchill has written that Kelly's death left a "crater" in his soul.

At the time of his death, Churchill was married to Natsu Saito, a professor of ethnic studies.

=== Ancestry ===
In 2003, Churchill stated, "I am myself of Muscogee and Creek descent on my father's side, Cherokee on my mother's, and am an enrolled member of the United Keetoowah Band of Cherokee Indians." In 1992, Churchill wrote elsewhere that he was one-eighth Creek and one-sixteenth Cherokee. In 1993, Churchill told the Colorado Daily that "he was one-sixteenth Creek and Cherokee." Churchill told the Denver Post in February 2005 that he was three-sixteenths Cherokee.

In a statement dated May 9, 2005, and posted on its website, the United Keetoowah Band said: "The United Keetoowah Band would like to make it clear that Mr. Churchill is not a member of the Keetoowah Band and was only given an honorary 'associate membership' in the early 1990s because he could not prove any Cherokee ancestry". The Band added that Churchill's claims of Keetoowah enrollment were deemed fraudulent by the United Keetoowah Band.

Two days later, the United Keetoowah Band replaced its earlier statement with the following: "Because Mr. Churchill had genealogical information regarding his alleged ancestry", and because he was willing "to assist the UKB in promoting the tribe and its causes, he was awarded an 'Associate Membership' as an honor". The Band clarified that Churchill "was not eligible for tribal membership due to the fact that he does not possess a 'Certificate of Degree of Indian Blood (CDIB)", and added that associate membership did not entitle an individual to voting rights or enrollment in the tribe. The Band's spokesperson, Lisa Stopp, stated the tribe enrolls only members with certified one-quarter American Indian blood. While the United Keetoowah Band voted to stop awarding associate memberships in 1994, the Band indicated in 2005 that Churchill still held an associate membership.

Churchill never asked for CDIB certification and said that he found the idea of being "vetted" by the US government offensive.

In June 2005, the Rocky Mountain News published an article about Churchill's genealogy and family history. The newspaper's research "turned up no evidence of a single Indian ancestor" among 142 direct ancestors [of Churchill's] identified from records. The News reported that both Churchill's birth parents were listed as white on the 1930 census, as were all but two of his great-great-grandparents listed on previous census and other official documents. The News found that some of Churchill's accounts of where his ancestors had lived did not agree with documented records. Nevertheless, numerous members of Churchill's extended family have longstanding family legends of Indian ancestry.

Some of Churchill's Native American critics, such as Vernon Bellecourt (White Earth Ojibwe) and Suzan Shown Harjo (Southern Cheyenne-Muscogee Creek), argue his assertion of Native American ancestry might constitute misrepresentation.

In a 2005 interview in The Rocky Mountain News, Churchill said, "I have never been confirmed as having one-quarter blood, and never said I was. And even if [the critics] are absolutely right, what does that have to do with this issue? I have never claimed to be goddamned Sitting Bull."

=== Activism ===
Churchill was a leader of Colorado AIM's annual protests in Denver against the Columbus Day holiday and its associated parade.

=== Death ===
Churchill died from complications of a stroke on August 11, 2026 in Atlanta, Georgia, at the age of 78.

== Works ==
Books, as editor

- Marxism and Native Americans. Boulder, Colorado: South End Press. 1984. ISBN 978-0-89608-178-9.
- Sharon Venne, ed. (1997). Islands in Captivity: The International Tribunal on the Rights of Indigenous Hawaiians. Boulder, Colorado: South End Press. ISBN 978-0-89608-568-8. Re-released as Churchill, Ward (2005). Sharon Venne (ed.). Islands in Captivity: The Record of the International Tribunal on the Rights of Indigenous Hawaiians. Boulder, Colorado: South End Press. ISBN 978-0-89608-738-5.
- Natsu Saito, ed. (2006). Confronting the Crime of Silence: Evidence of U.S. War Crimes in Indochina. AK Press. ISBN 978-1-904859-21-5.

Books, as author and co-author

- with Elisabeth Lloyd (1984). Culture versus Economism: Essays on Marxism in the Multicultural Arena. Indigena Press.
- with Jim Vander Wall (1988). Agents of Repression: The FBI's Secret Wars Against the Black Panther Party and the American Indian Movement. Boulder, Colorado: South End Press. ISBN 978-0-89608-294-6.
- with Jim Vander Wall (1990). The COINTELPRO Papers: Documents from the FBI's Secret War Against Domestic Dissent. Boulder, Colorado: South End Press. ISBN 978-0-89608-359-2.
- Fantasies of the Master Race: Literature, Cinema, and the Colonization of American Indians. Common Courage Press. 1992. ISBN 978-0-87286-348-4.
- Churchill, Ward; Vander Wall, Jim; Vander Wall, Jennie, eds. (1992). Cages of steel: The politics of imprisonment in the United States. Washington, DC: Maisonneuve Press. ISBN 978-0-944624-17-3. OCLC 26158490. Re-released as Churchill, Ward (2004). Vander Wall, Jim (ed.). Politics of Imprisonment in the United States. AK Press. ISBN 978-1-904859-12-3.
- Struggle for the Land: Indigenous Resistance to Genocide, Ecocide and Expropriation in Contemporary North America. Common Courage Press. 1993. ISBN 978-1-56751-001-0. Revised and expanded edition: Struggle for the Land: Native North American Resistance to Genocide, Ecocide and Colonization. San Francisco CA: City Lights Books. 2002. ISBN 978-0-87286-415-3.
- Indians Are Us?: Culture and Genocide in Native North America. Common Courage Press. 1994. ISBN 978-1-56751-021-8.
- Since Predator Came: Notes from the Struggle for American Indian Liberation. Aigis Press. 1995. ISBN 978-1-883930-03-5.
- Churchill, Ward (1996). From a Native Son: Selected Essays on Indigenism 1985–1995. Boulder, Colorado: South End Press. ISBN 978-0-89608-553-4.
- Churchill, Ward; Ryan, Michael (1998). Pacifism as Pathology: Reflections on the Role of Armed Struggle in North America (PDF) (1st ed.). Winnipeg: Arbeiter Ring. ISBN 978-1-894037-07-5.
  - Churchill, Ward; Ryan, Michael (2007). Pacifism as Pathology: Reflections on the Role of Armed Struggle in North America. Edinburgh: AK Press. ISBN 978-1-904859-18-5.
  - Churchill, Ward; Ryan, Michael (April 15, 2017). Pacifism as Pathology: Reflections on the Role of Armed Struggle in North America (3rd revised and expanded ed.). Oakland, California: PM Press. ISBN 978-1-62963-329-9.
- A Little Matter of Genocide. San Francisco CA: City Lights Books. 1998. ISBN 978-0-87286-343-9.
- Draconian Measures: The History of FBI Political Repression. Common Courage Press. 2000. ISBN 978-1-56751-059-1.
- Acts Of Rebellion: The Ward Churchill Reader. Routledge. 2002. ISBN 978-0-415-93156-4.
- Perversions of Justice: Indigenous Peoples and Angloamerican Law. San Francisco CA: City Lights Books. 2002. ISBN 978-0-87286-416-0.
- On the Justice of Roosting Chickens: Reflections on the Consequences of U.S. Imperial Arrogance and Criminality. AK Press. 2003. ISBN 978-1-902593-79-1.
- Kill the Indian, Save the Man: The Genocidal Impact of American Indian Residential Schools. San Francisco CA: City Lights Books. 2004. ISBN 978-0-87286-434-4.
- Speaking Truth in the Teeth of Power: Lectures on Globalization, Colonialism, and Native North America. AK Press. 2004. ISBN 978-1-904859-04-8.
- To Disrupt, Discredit And Destroy: The FBI's Secret War Against The Black Panther Party. Routledge. 2005. ISBN 978-0-415-92957-8.
- Wielding Words like Weapons: Selected Essays in Indigenism, 1995–2005. PM Press. 2017. ISBN 978-1-629-63101-1.

Articles

- Churchill, Ward (July–September 1992). "I Am Indigenist: Notes on the Ideology of the Fourth World". Z Papers. 1 (3). Archived from the original on September 16, 2001.
- Churchill, Ward (1994). "Let's Spread the Fun Around". American Indian Movement of Colorado, Denver/Boulder Chapter. Archived from the original on September 12, 2007. First published as "Crimes Against Humanity" in Anderson, Margaret (1994). Hill, Patricia (ed.). Race, Class and Gender: An Anthology. Belmont, CA: Wadsworth. pp. 366–73. ISBN 9780534247683. Also published under the titles "The Indian Chant and the Tomahawk Chop" and "Using Indian Names as Mascots Harms Native Americans".
- Churchill, Ward (November 1998). "Smoke Signals: A History of Native Americans in Cinema". LiP Magazine.
- Churchill, Ward (Winter–Spring 2003). "An American Holocaust? The Structure of Denial". Socialism and Democracy. 17 (2): 25–76. doi:10.1080/08854300308428341. S2CID 143631746. Archived from the original on February 6, 2005.
- Churchill, Ward (Spring 2005). "The Ghosts of 9-1-1: Reflections on History, Justice and Roosting Chickens". Alternative Press Review. 9 (1): 45–56. Archived from the original on October 2, 2006.
- Churchill, Ward (July–August 2007). "The Fourth World: Struggles for Traditional Lands and Ways of Life". Left Turn. 25: 25–29.

Audio and video

- Doing Time: The Politics of Imprisonment, audio CD of a lecture, recorded at the Doing Time Conference at the University of Winnipeg, September 2000 (AK Press, 2001, ISBN 978-1-902593-47-0)
- Life in Occupied America (AK Press, 2003, ISBN 978-1-902593-72-2)
- In a Pig's Eye: Reflections on the Police State, Repression, and Native America (AK Press, 2002, ISBN 978-1-902593-50-0)
- US Off the Planet!: An Evening In Eugene With Ward Churchill And Chellis Glendinning, VHS video recorded July 17, 2001 (Cascadia Media Collective, 2002)
- Pacifism and Pathology in the American Left, 2003 audio CD recorded at an AK Press warehouse in Oakland (AK Press Audio)
- Z Mag Ward Churchill Audio August 10, 2003 and earlier
- Churchill Speaks About Academic Freedom – Free Speech Radio News February 9, 2005
- Ward Churchill Under Fire – Free Speech Radio News, February 3, 2005.
- The Justice of Roosting Chickens: Ward Churchill Speaks The Pacifica Network Show, Democracy Now! from February 18, 2005, features extended Audio/Video exclusive interview with Churchill.
- "A Little Matter of Genocide: Linking U.S. Aggression Abroad to the Domestic Repression of Indigenous Peoples", recorded in North Battleford, Saskatchewan, on March 19, 2005
- Debate with David Horowitz and Ward Churchill at George Washington University April 6, 2006
  - "Full two-hour audio of debate with David Horowitz". rightalk.listenz.com. Archived from the original on June 19, 2007.
  - "David Horowitz vs. Ward Churchill — Round 1". Young Americans Foundation. Archived from the original on April 28, 2006. Video and audio (excerpt)
  - "David Horowitz vs. Ward Churchill". insidehighered.com.

== See also ==
- List of scientific misconduct incidents
