= Cleveland Indigenous activism =

Overview of indigenous activism in Cleveland, Ohio

Indigenous activists in Cleveland, Ohio, have advocated Indigenous issues and rights since the early 1900s.

After the removal of the last Native Americans from their traditional territory in Ohio in 1842, Cleveland, and the greater Cuyahoga County, had an almost nonexistent Indigenous population. However, in the early 1900s, an Osaukee man named Chief Thunderwater engaged in activism, protesting the displacement of the Erie Street Cemetery and creating the Supreme Council of Indian Nations, which advocated for Indigenous peoples' right to cross the United States–Canada border in the Supreme Court case of McCandless v. United States.

Later in the century, the Indian Relocation Act of 1956 moved a variety of Native Americans from their different reservations in the West into Ohio, specifically metropolitan areas like Cleveland. With the resurgent population came a wave of activism, as the Cleveland American Indian center was created and the national American Indian Movement established a chapter in the city in 1970.

Annual mascot protests in Cleveland began in 1972, with local groups AIM and the Committee of 500 Years of Dignity and Resistance participating. An important Ohio Supreme Court case, Bellecourt v. City of Cleveland, protected protestors first amendment rights in court. The Cleveland Indians ended the use of their old mascot, Chief Wahoo, in 2019 and in 2020 announced that they would consider changing their team name, in response to ongoing protests. In July 2021, the Cleveland baseball team announced their new name: The Cleveland Guardians. Mascot protests also extend to local schools in the Cleveland area, where the Oberlin School District ended their use of Indians as their mascot.

== History of Indigenous people in Cleveland ==
One of the first Indigenous peoples to live in what is now known as Cleveland were the Erie people. The Erie inhabited most of the southern shore of Lake Erie, and they were wiped out by a war with the Iroquois Confederacy in 1656. Erie survivors assimilated into neighboring tribes, especially the Seneca. After the Erie people, northeastern Ohio remained sparsely populated until Lenape from Delaware migrated into the area in the mid 1700s. The first settlement in present-day Cleveland was Pilgerruh or Pilgrim's Run, founded in 1786 by Moravian missionaries and Christian Lenape on the bank of the Cuyahoga River.

The Northwest Indian War between the newly formed United States military and the Native American tribes living in the Northwest Territory resulted in the first of many official land cessions. The Treaty of Greenville in 1795 formally ceded any Native American claims to land east of the Cuyahoga River and all of southern Ohio. A series of treaties continued to cede land to the United States until the Treaty of St. Mary's signed away the last Native American land claims in the state of Ohio. Further treaties forcibly removed Indigenous tribes from their reservations within Ohio to new land in the West. The 1842 Treaty with the Wyandot moved the last Indigenous peoples in Ohio, the Wyandot, from their land in the Upper Sandusky Reservation to land west of the Mississippi River. It is documented by Bill Moose Crowfoot that 12 Wyandot families chose to stay behind. Crowfoot was the last full blood Wyandot to die in Ohio, in Upper Arlington in 1937, and according to the Draper manuscripts there were a few Lenape, Shawnee, and Mingo who did as well.

After forced removal of Native people from their traditional lands, there were not many Indigenous people living in Cleveland. In 1900 there were only 2 Native American residents in Cuyahoga County, and in 1940 the population only increased to 47. The Indian Relocation Act of 1956 changed federal policy toward American Indians from reservations toward relocations. The Bureau of Indian Affairs chose Cleveland as one of 8 destination cities, dramatically increasing the Native population in following decades. By 1990, the population of American Indians in Cleveland reached 2,706.

== Chief Thunderwater ==
Chief Thunderwater, from the Osaukee tribe, was born named Oghema Niagara in the Tuscaroras Indian reservation in New York. He moved to Cleveland in the early 1900s as a businessman selling herbal medicines. While in Cleveland, Chief Thunderwater became involved in American Indian activism.

=== Erie Street Cemetery ===
The Erie Street Cemetery is a cemetery in downtown Cleveland, first opened in 1826. In the early 1900s the city government started plans to reinter the bodies buried in Erie Street and use the land for the Lorain–Carnegie bridge. The Pioneers Memorial Association was founded in 1914 to advocate for preservation of the cemetery. Buried at the Erie Street Cemetery is Joc-O-Sot, a Meskwaki warrior who fought in the Black Hawk War. Joc-O-Sot was returning from a trip to Washington D.C. to advocate for American Indian rights, when he fell ill with tuberculosis, ultimately dying in Cleveland in 1844. Chief Thunderwater became involved with the Pioneers Memorial Association to protest disruption of Joc-O-Sot's grave. He famously prophesied that Cleveland would suffer a horrible catastrophe if anyone moved Joc-O-Sot's grave. The movement was ultimately successful in 1925 when the city decided to alter the plans for the bridge.

=== Supreme Council of Indian Nations ===
In 1917, Chief Thunderwater created the Supreme Council of Indian Nations, a restoration of the Iroquois Confederacy. Chief Thunderwater served as leader of the council from 1917 until his death in 1950, during which he spearheaded the Thunderwater movement. The Thunderwater movement called for a pan-Indigenous, united American Indian nation that united tribes in both the United States and Canada. The Council called for education, temperance, and healthy lifestyles among Native Americans, especially in reservations. Chief Thunderwater and the Supreme Council also advocated for American Indian legal rights, for example a case disputing the United States–Canada border.

In 1928, the Third Circuit Court of Appeals decision of McCandless v. United States affirmed that Indigenous peoples whose traditional territory existed in both the United States and Canada could legally cross the border. Paul Diabo, an Iroquois man born in Canada who moved back and forth between countries, was arrested and ordered to be deported for illegal entry into the United States in 1925. Chief Thunderwater and the Supreme Council were heavily involved in advocacy for Diabo's case. The decision in favor of Diabo reaffirmed Native American's rights to cross the border, citing the Jay Treaty that originally established the border between the United States and Canada. Jay's Treaty stated that Indigenous peoples could freely cross the border, and the litigation decided that Jay's Treaty still applied to them, when it was effectively abolished after the War of 1812.

== Cleveland American Indian Center ==
The Cleveland American Indian Center was founded by Oglala activist Russel Means in 1969 in the basement of the St. John's Episcopal Church. The goal of the center was to help relocated Native Americans adapt to their new lives off of the reservation. Programs included cultural preservation, tutoring, and job training, among others. The center consulted with the Cleveland Public School District to revise their curriculum regarding American Indians and helped the Cleveland Public Library improve its collection on Native American history. Another program the center started was a reverse relocation program for Indigenous peoples relocated to Cleveland who wished to return to reservation life.

For Cleveland's super sesquicentennial celebration in 1971, the local government put together a reenactment of the settlement of the city. The organizers called the Cleveland American Indian Center to show up to the reenactment in traditional garb and welcome the settlers. Instead, Means and fellow representatives of the center staged a protest at the ceremony, only letting up when the city government agreed to address Native American issues.

In 1995, the Cleveland American Indian Center closed, and was replaced by the American Indian Education Center.

== American Indian Movement ==
The American Indian Movement (AIM) was founded in 1968 in Minneapolis, Minnesota by a collective of Native American activists. The group was founded in response to racist treatment from federal policy and to fight for Indigenous rights. Famous protests organized by AIM include the occupation of Alcatraz, the Trail of Broken Treaties, and the Wounded Knee incident. Representatives from Cleveland participated in these nationwide protests. In 1970, AIM launched a multi-city sit in protest at the Bureau of Indian Affairs (BIA) offices, calling for the abolishment of the BIA. Led by Means, the sit in at the Cleveland BIA office resulted in the arrest of 8 protestors. Other cities involved in the 1970 BIA sit ins included Littleton, Chicago, Alameda, Philadelphia, Dallas, Minneapolis, Los Angeles, and Albuquerque. Means also led the 1973 protest at Wounded Knee, which ended in violence after 71 days of occupation.

The Cleveland chapter of AIM was founded in 1970 also by Russel Means, the second chapter after Minneapolis. The Cleveland chapter is a member of the American Indian Movement International Confederation of Autonomous Chapters based in Denver, rather than the American Indian Movement Grand Governing Council based in Minneapolis. The schism in AIM was led by Means and occurred in 1993 after he accused AIM leadership of criminal activity. Autonomous chapters, such as Cleveland's, operate under decentralized leadership and instead focus on local activism.

== Mascot protests ==
A main focus for Indigenous activism is against sports mascots, from the professional level to schools, that appropriate American Indian imagery or employ racist stereotypes. At the professional level, teams like the Atlanta Braves, Kansas City Chiefs, Chicago Blackhawks, and Cleveland Indians have drawn very little controversy over their use of Native American symbols. Polling in 2020 shows that a majority of Native American people caring about team names, mascots, chants, and dances that imitate native culture. Successes of this activism include the Indians stopping the use of Chief Wahoo in 2019 and the Washington Redskins dropping the Redskins name in 2020.

=== Cleveland Indians ===
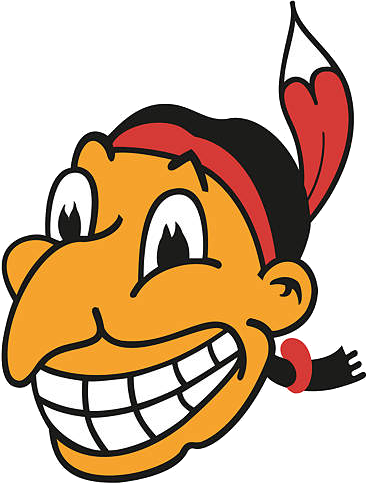
Original Chief Wahoo logo from 1947

The Cleveland Indians baseball team was formed in 1915, and they began to use Chief Wahoo in 1947. Immediately prior to the Indians, the team was called the Naps after player Napoleon Lajoie. Some claim that the team was named the Indians in honor of Louis Sockalexis, a member of Penobscot nation who was the first Native American to play Major League Baseball. Sockalexis had played for the Cleveland Spiders from 1897 to 1899 and died in 1913, just two years before the name change. However, others claim that the team chose the Indians name after the Boston Braves won the 1914 World Series. Many believed that the team's popularity came from its usage of Native American imagery in the name, so the Cleveland organization desired to also adopt a Native American name. The original Chief Wahoo logo from 1947 was a yellow-faced caricature of a Native American with an enlarged nose. In 1948, the team changed the color of the face to red, and, in 1951, Wahoo's nose was changed to be smaller and the eyes were changed to triangles, the iteration officially used until 2018.

The Cleveland American Indian Center sued the Cleveland Indians in 1972 for $9 million for libel and slander against Native peoples, the first lawsuit of its kind against a team. Since 1973, activists have staged protests outside the team's stadium on opening day every single year. Other notable protests of the Indians' name and Chief Wahoo occurred during the Indian's 1997 and 2016 trips to the World Series. In 1999, AIM filed a civil rights complaint against the Indians through the Ohio Commission on Civil Rights.

The Committee of 500 Years of Dignity and Resistance was formed in Cleveland in 1992 to mark the 500th anniversary of Christopher Columbus's 1492 voyage. The Committee protested in Public Square as a part of international protests against celebrating the quincentenary of Columbus arriving in the Americas. After 1992, the group has turned its focus to protesting the Cleveland Indians' team name and Chief Wahoo alongside AIM.

Vernon Bellecourt, a prominent AIM activist, was arrested along with a group of fellow activists in 1998 during an opening day protest in Cleveland. Bellecourt and the other protestors were arrested for aggravated arson after burning effigies of Chief Wahoo in front of the stadium, then called Jacob's Field. Although charges were never filed, Bellecourt sued the city of Cleveland on the grounds of violating their civil rights. The case made its way to the Ohio Supreme Court, which ruled that the burning of the Chief Wahoo effigy was protected speech under the First Amendment. This decision was based on the precedent set by cases Texas v. Johnson and United States v. O'Brien that deemed burning the American flag and draft cards were protected actions.

After the close of the 2018 season, the Indians announced that they would stop using Chief Wahoo on all of their uniforms. CEO and part-owner of the Indians Paul Dolan decided to abandon Chief Wahoo for a red "C" logo on uniforms under pressure from MLB commissioner Rob Manfred. However, the franchise still maintains the Chief Wahoo trademark and profits from selling merchandise that features the logo.

In response to social movements for diversity and inclusion following the murder of George Floyd, the Indians announced on July 3, 2020 that they would begin to consider changing their team name. Dolan said that the team will talk with Native American activists to discuss the name change. Despite the COVID-19 pandemic, Indigenous activists continued the annual opening day protest at Progressive Field in 2020. No fans were allowed at the game, but a group of 100 protestors still demonstrated outside of the stadium.

Cleveland AIM released a statement on July 8, 2020, regarding the potential Indians name change. Their statement lists the following actions that they requested the Indians organization take: stop using the name "Indians" and the term "Tribe" until they can rename, stop the licensing of Chief Wahoo, sue any organizations that use the Chief Wahoo logo, apologize to Indigenous people for harm, and create an education campaign with local schools and the public to explain why the tokenization of Indigenous peoples is harmful.

=== Local schools ===
Cleveland AIM also turned its focus on local high schools' mascots. Oberlin High School, in Oberlin, Ohio just outside of Cleveland, once used the Oberlin Indians as its mascot. A petition to the Oberlin School Board led by Sundance, local activist and director of Cleveland AIM, asked the district to drop the use of the Indians name and their Indian-themed mascot. In 2007, the school district abandoned the name and changed it to the Oberlin Phoenix.
