= Eddie Benton-Banai =

American civil rights organizer (1931–2020)

- Bawdwaywidun Banaisee
- Born: March 4, 1931; Sawyer County, Wisconsin, U.S.
- Died: November 30, 2020 (aged 89); Hayward, Wisconsin, U.S.
- Education: University of Minnesota (M.Ed.)
- Occupation: Civil rights organizer
- Known for: Co-founding the American Indian Movement

Edward Benton-Banai (March 4, 1931 – November 30, 2020) was an American civil rights activist, one of the founders of the American Indian Movement (AIM).

== Life and education ==
Born on March 4, 1931, Benton-Banai was Ojibwe-Anishinabe of the Fish Clan from Lac Courte Oreilles Reservation in Northern Wisconsin. In 1986 Benton-Banai became grand chief of the Three Fires Midewiwin Lodge. He was commonly referred to as Bawdwaywidun.

Benton-Banai held a Master’s Degree in Education from the University of Minnesota.

In 1979, Benton-Banai wrote The Mishomis Book (drawn from the Teachings of the Seven Grandfathers), which chronicles Anishinaabe way of life and the Seven Fires Prophecy.

In 2008 he was appointed as an academic and spiritual adviser to Shingwauk Kinoomaage Gamig. Benton's role as a spiritual adviser to Shingwauk can be seen in his guidance provided for the construction of the lodge shaped roof of the Anishinabek Discover Centre built in Sault Ste. Marie, Ontario. Benton-Banai died in Hayward, Wisconsin on November 30, 2020, aged 89.

== Activism ==
Benton-Banai was one of the founders and spiritual advisers of the American Indian Movement, a grassroots movement to fight systemic oppression and colonial violence against Native Americans. Eddie Benton Banai was jailed alongside Clyde Bellecourt in 1962 at Minnesota Stillwater Prison for his activism work. Benton Banai, Clyde Bellecourt, George Mitchell and Dennis Banks established the “Concerned Indian Americans" in July 1968 which was eventually renamed AIM.

Benton-Banai was at the occupation of Wounded Knee village in 1973.

He founded the Red School House, in St. Paul, Minnesota in 1972. The Red School was an Indigenous controlled education institute based on the belief that education should include Indigenous spiritual and cultural teachings.
