= Teachings of the Seven Grandfathers =

Core teachings of the Anishinaabeg

Among the Anishinaabe people, the Teachings of the Seven Grandfathers, also known simply as either the Seven Teachings or Seven Grandfathers, is a set of principles that demonstrates what it means to live a "good life". They detail human conduct towards others, the Earth, and all of Nature. Originating from a traditional Potawatomi and Ojibwe story, these teachings are not attributed to any specific creator. The story, and the teachings have been passed on orally by elders for centuries. An Ojibwe Anishinaabe man, Edward Benton-Banai, describes an in-depth understanding of what each means, in his novel The Mishomis Book.

== Background ==
The Seven Grandfathers were powerful spirits who held the responsibility of watching over the people. They noticed how difficult life on Earth was for the people and sent their helper down amongst the people to find a person whom they could teach to live in harmony with the Earth. The helper found a newborn child, however the Seven Grandfathers believed him to be too young at that time. Shkabwes, the helper, was instructed to take the boy to see the four quarters of the universe in order to give him more time to grow. When he returned, the boy was seven years old. The Grandfathers then began to teach the young boy, and they each presented him with a gift. These gifts were Wisdom, Love, Respect, Bravery, Honesty, Humility, and Truth. The boy, now a full-grown man, returned to the people and taught them of the gifts of the Seven Grandfathers. With the gifts and the understanding the people now had, they began to adjust to the daily challenges. The people had learned to live in harmony with the Earth.

In Edward Benton-Banai's story "The Mishomis Book" it is stated that the aadizookaan (traditional story) or the teachings of the seven grandfathers were given to the Anishinaabeg early in their history. The teachings of the seven grandfathers span centuries, and in those centuries the story has been adapted in various ways. Benton-Banai manages to incorporate many traditional teachings into his story about the Seven Grandfather Teachings. He succeeds in showing how an Anishinaabe Traditional Teacher can borrow from traditional teachings and recombine and change them to make them relevant to contemporary issues faced by Anishinaabe people.

Leanne Simpson, a Mississauga Nishnaabeg writer, musician, and academic, wrote the book A Short Story of the Blockade. Within that book, Simpson references the Seven Grandfathers, but when discussing the seven gifts, rather than referencing honesty, she speaks about kindness. Additionally, in another book from Simpson, As We Have Always Done, she references these teachings as the “Seven Grandmothers." The idea behind the story of the Seven Grandfathers and their teachings remains the same, yet the story itself has been adapted throughout its history.

== Teachings ==
The Teachings of the Seven Grandfathers are among the most commonly shared teachings in Ojibwe culture. They hold great significance to the Anishinaabe people and are considered to be the founding principles of their way of life.

- Nibwaakaawin—Wisdom (Beaver): To cherish knowledge is to know Wisdom. Wisdom is given by the Creator to be used for the good of the people. In the Anishinaabe language, this word expresses not only "wisdom," but also means "prudence," or "intelligence." In some communities, Gikendaasowin is used; in addition to "wisdom," this word can also mean "intelligence" or "knowledge."
- Zaagi'idiwin—Love (Eagle): To know peace is to know Love. Love must be unconditional. When people are weak they need love the most. In the Anishinaabe language, this word with the reciprocal theme idi indicates that this form of love is mutual. In some communities, Gizhaawenidiwin is used, which in most context means "jealousy" but in this context is translated as either "love" or "zeal". Again, the reciprocal theme idi indicates that this form of love is mutual.
- Minaadendamowin—Respect (Buffalo): To honor all creation is to have Respect. All of creation should be treated with respect. You must give respect if you wish to be respected. Some communities instead use Ozhibwaadenindiwin or Manazoonidiwin.
- Aakode'ewin—Bravery (Bear): Bravery is to face the foe with integrity. In the Anishinaabe language, this word literally means "state of having a fearless heart." To do what is right even when the consequences are unpleasant. Some communities instead use either Zoongadiziwin ("state of having a strong casing") or Zoongide'ewin ("state of having a strong heart").
- Gwayakwaadiziwin—Honesty (Raven or Sabé): Honesty in facing a situation is to be brave. Always be honest in word and action. Be honest first with yourself, and you will more easily be able to be honest with others. In the Anishinaabe language, this word can also mean "righteousness."
- Dabaadendiziwin—Humility (Wolf): Humility is to know yourself as a sacred part of Creation. In the Anishinaabe language, this word can also mean "compassion." You are equal to others, but you are not better. Some communities instead express this with Bekaadiziwin, which in addition to "humility" can also be translated as "calmness," "meekness," "gentility" or "patience."
- Debwewin—Truth (Turtle): Truth is to know all of these things. Speak the truth. Do not deceive yourself or others.

== The teachings in a contemporary society ==
The Seven Grandfather teachings have been around for centuries, passed on from elders through storytelling. These teachings have helped shape the way of life for Anishinaabe people for years and continue to do so. The stories can be adapted to fit specific community values. The teachings have been incorporated by organizations, schools, different programs, artists, individualists, and tribes.

In contemporary society, these teachings have been used as a way to heal from and prevent both domestic and sexual violence. When taught in relation to these topics, humility teaches one to find balance, bravery allows individuals to continue living their lives in the face of their fears, honesty teaches people to be honest and to accept oneself, wisdom allows one to know and respect their boundaries, truth asks that one be true to themselves, respect ensures one not be hurtful to themselves or others, and finally love teaches to know and love thyself.

== See also ==
- Anishinaabe traditional beliefs
- Seven Laws of Noah—Seven universal teachings in Judaism
- Virtue
