= American Indian Movement of Colorado =

The American Indian Movement of Colorado (Colorado AIM), also called AIM-International Confederation of Autonomous Chapters, is a breakaway group from the American Indian Movement.

It was founded by thirteen AIM chapters in 1993 at a meeting in Denver, Colorado. The group issued its Edgewood Declaration, citing organizational and ideological grievances and alleging criminal acts by some leaders of the Minneapolis-based, national organization. The autonomous chapters group argues that AIM has always been organized as a series of decentralized, autonomous chapters, with local leadership accountable to local constituencies. The autonomous chapters reject the assertions of central control by the Minneapolis group as contrary both to indigenous political traditions and to the original philosophy of AIM.

Notable activists associated with AIM of Colorado have been Russell Means and Ward Churchill.

== Cause of the split ==
In 1999, Russell Means, a notable American Indian activist, who served on AIM's Elders Council, held a press conference in Denver with Robert Pictou-Branscombe, a maternal cousin of Anna Mae Aquash, the high-ranking AIM woman who was murdered in December 1975 at the Pine Ridge Indian Reservation. Branscombe and Means accused top-ranking AIM leader Vernon Bellecourt of Minneapolis of having ordered the execution of Aquash, in the mistaken belief that she was a Federal Bureau of Investigation (FBI) informant. Means also alleged that Vernon's brother Clyde Bellecourt, a founder of AIM and continuing leader, was also implicated in the death of Aquash. Branscombe and Means said that Arlo Looking Cloud, Theda Nelson Clarke and John Graham had been directly involved in the kidnapping and murder of Aquash. Archive

Vernon Bellecourt denied any involvement by him or his brother, but Looking Cloud and Graham were indicted by a federal grand jury in 2003, and convicted of the murder of Aquash in 2004 and 2010, respectively. Each is serving a life sentence. By the time of the indictments, Theda Nelson Clarke was being cared for in a nursing home and was not indicted.

== Public image ==
The Colorado AIM came to national attention in 2005 because of publicity related to one of its leaders, Ward Churchill, who was fired that year from his tenured position as professor at the University of Colorado-Boulder after an investigation into academic misconduct. He serves on the Leadership Council of AIM of Colorado.

Recent AIM activism in Colorado has centered on protests against the Columbus Day parade, held annually in Denver. In 2015, Denver approved permanent recognition of Indigenous Peoples' Day.
