= Statue of Christopher Columbus (Saint Paul, Minnesota) =

Statue of Christopher Columbus formerly installed in Saint Paul, Minnesota, U.S.

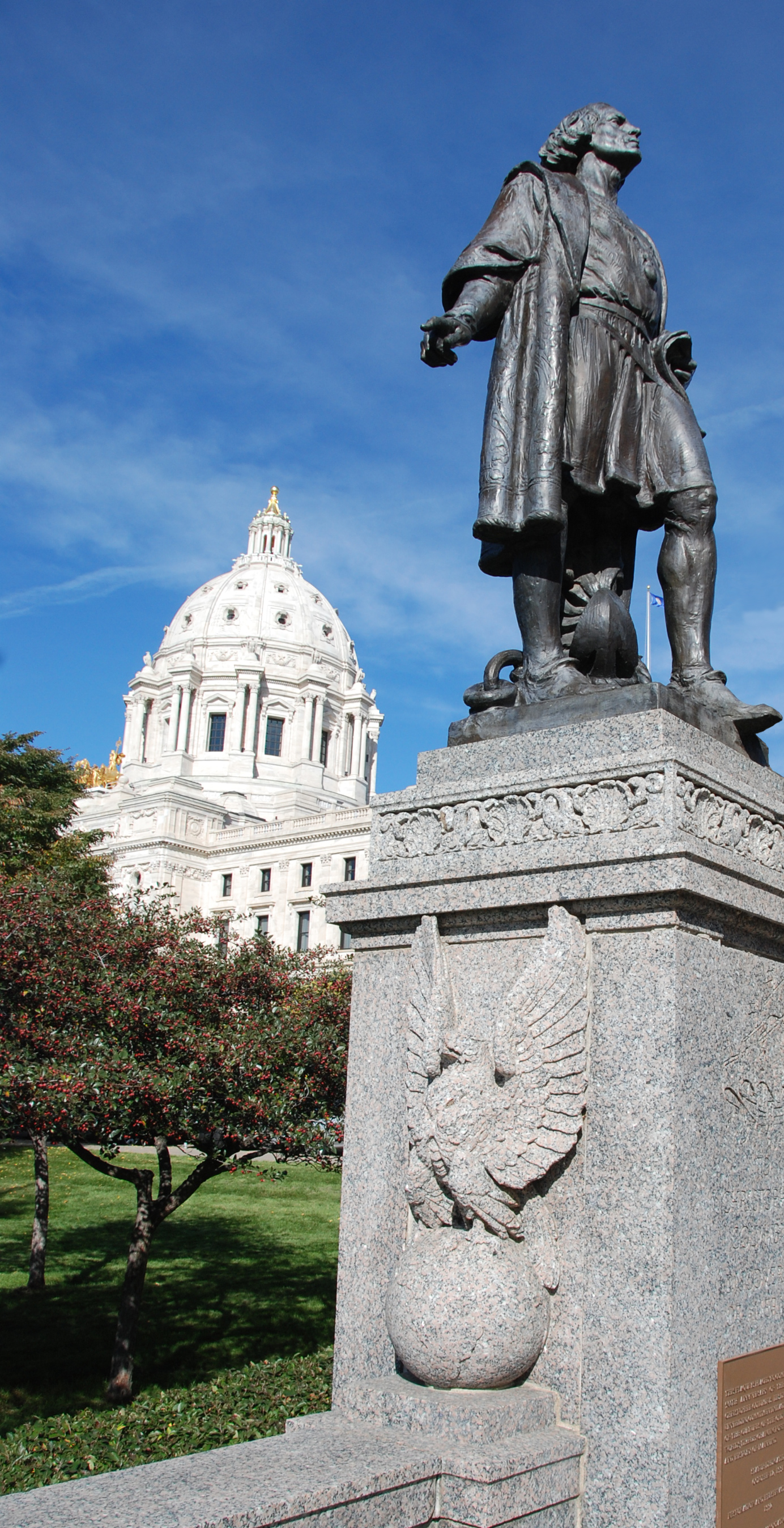
- The statue in 2013
- Artist: Charles Brioschi
- Completion date: 1931
- Subject: Christopher Columbus
- Dimensions: 3.0 m (10 ft)
- Condition: Removed June 10, 2020
- Location: Saint Paul, Minnesota, U.S.; 44°57′15.9″N 93°6′3.5″W

A bronze statue of Christopher Columbus was installed on the grounds of the Minnesota State Capitol in Saint Paul, Minnesota in 1931. The 10-foot statue was created by Italian American Carlo “Charles” Brioschi.

In June 2020 American Indian Movement activists toppled the statue as part of the series of protests following the murder of George Floyd, and it was moved into storage.

== History ==
=== Origin ===
A Minnesota memorial for Christopher Columbus was first proposed at a 1927 meeting of the Italian Progressive Club of Duluth. Later that year, the idea was endorsed at a meeting of the Minnesota Federation of Italian American Clubs in Hibbing. The Christopher Columbus Memorial Association was then established and chapters in Minneapolis–Saint Paul and the Iron Range raised funds from Italian Americans for a statue. The statue was originally conceived as a way to counter discrimination against Italian Americans, who were considered outsiders by the earlier, predominantly Northern European settlers.

The 10-foot bronze statue was created by sculptor Charles "Carlo" Brioschi, with assistance from Leo Lentelli. A site for the memorial was set aside in Saint Paul on the grounds of the Minnesota State Capitol, across from what was then the Minnesota Historical Society Building but is now the Minnesota Judicial Center. The statue was unveiled before a crowd of 24,000 on October 12, 1931. Speeches were given by Governor Floyd B. Olson and Minnesota Historical Society president Guy Stanton Ford. Attendees included former Senator Frank B. Kellogg and Senator Henrik Shipstead.

Minnesota proclaimed Columbus Day an official state holiday that same year. An inscription on the memorial's plaque reads "To Christopher Columbus, Discoverer of America." A 2015 bill introduced by John Persell sought to change the plaque to say that Columbus "landed in America.". A second plaque, added in 1992, claims that Columbus started "the merging of the cultures of the old and new worlds; Thereby changing forever the course and history of mankind."

In anticipation of the quincentennial of Columbus sailing to the Bahamas, the Italian American Society made a donation for the preservation of the statue in 1991. The statue was pressure washed and treated to restore a "Roman bronze" patination. Just before the anniversary in 1992, vandals doused the statue with red paint, necessitating an emergency cleaning.

=== Controversy ===
The push to remove Confederate monuments in the wake of the 2015 Charleston church shooting and the 2017 Unite the Right rally sparked discussions over the future of the Columbus statue. Indigenous Peoples Day became an official city holiday of Saint Paul in 2015 and a state holiday in 2016. Native American activists and their allies argued that the statue legitimizes the myth that Columbus discovered America and creates an unwelcome environment on the Capitol grounds, citing his role in genocide, colonialism, and dispossession. Minnesota newspapers ran articles about the controversy surrounding the statue and a 2017 petition sought to replace the statue with one of Prince and another selected by the state's Native American community.

=== 2020 removal ===
In the weeks following the murder of George Floyd in Minneapolis on May 25, 2020, protests spread to Saint Paul, then to the rest of the nation. The removal of monuments became a theme of the movement early on and by June 9, protesters in Richmond, Virginia had torn down their Columbus statue, set it on fire, and tossed it in a lake while protesters in Boston had severed the head of theirs.

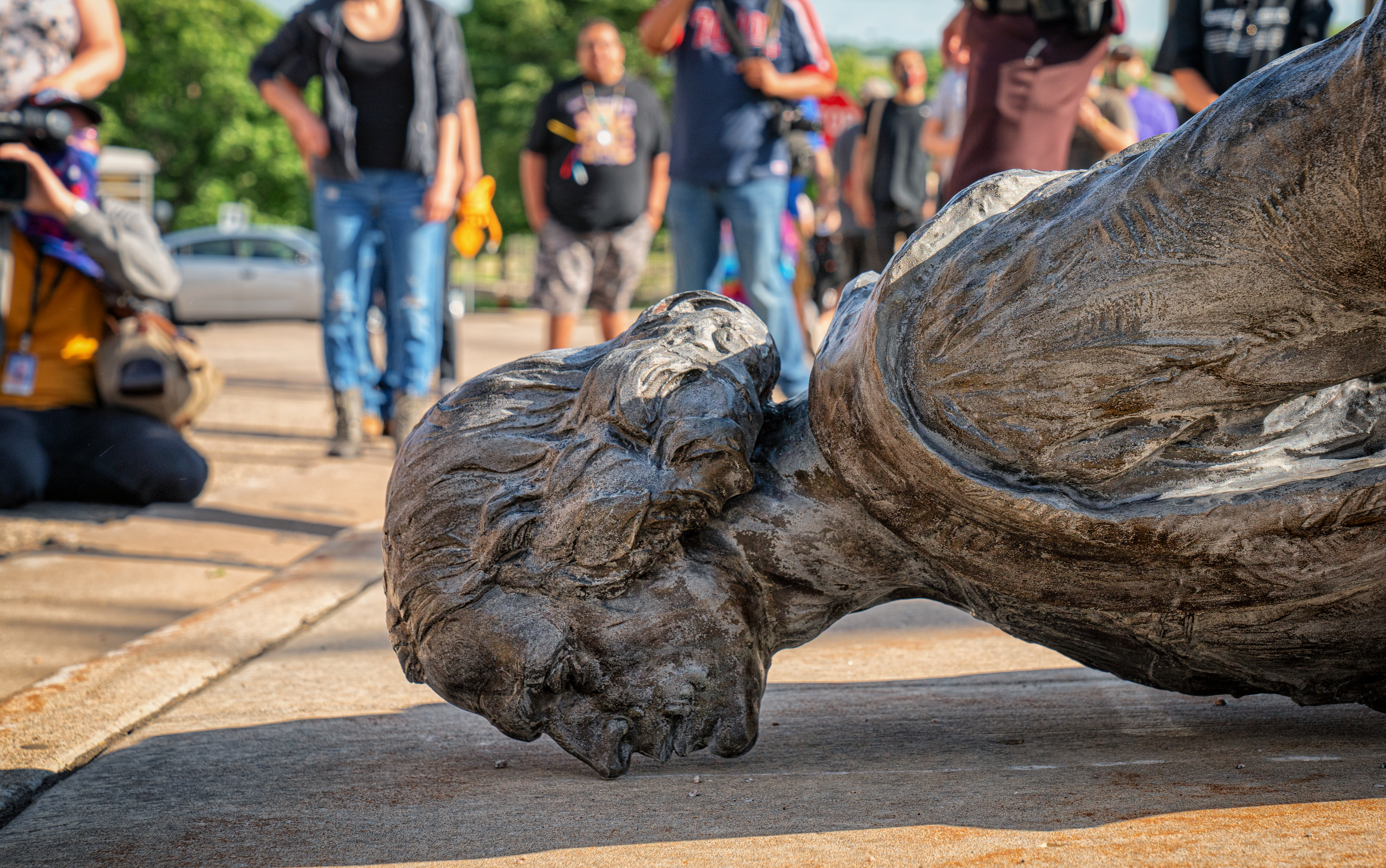
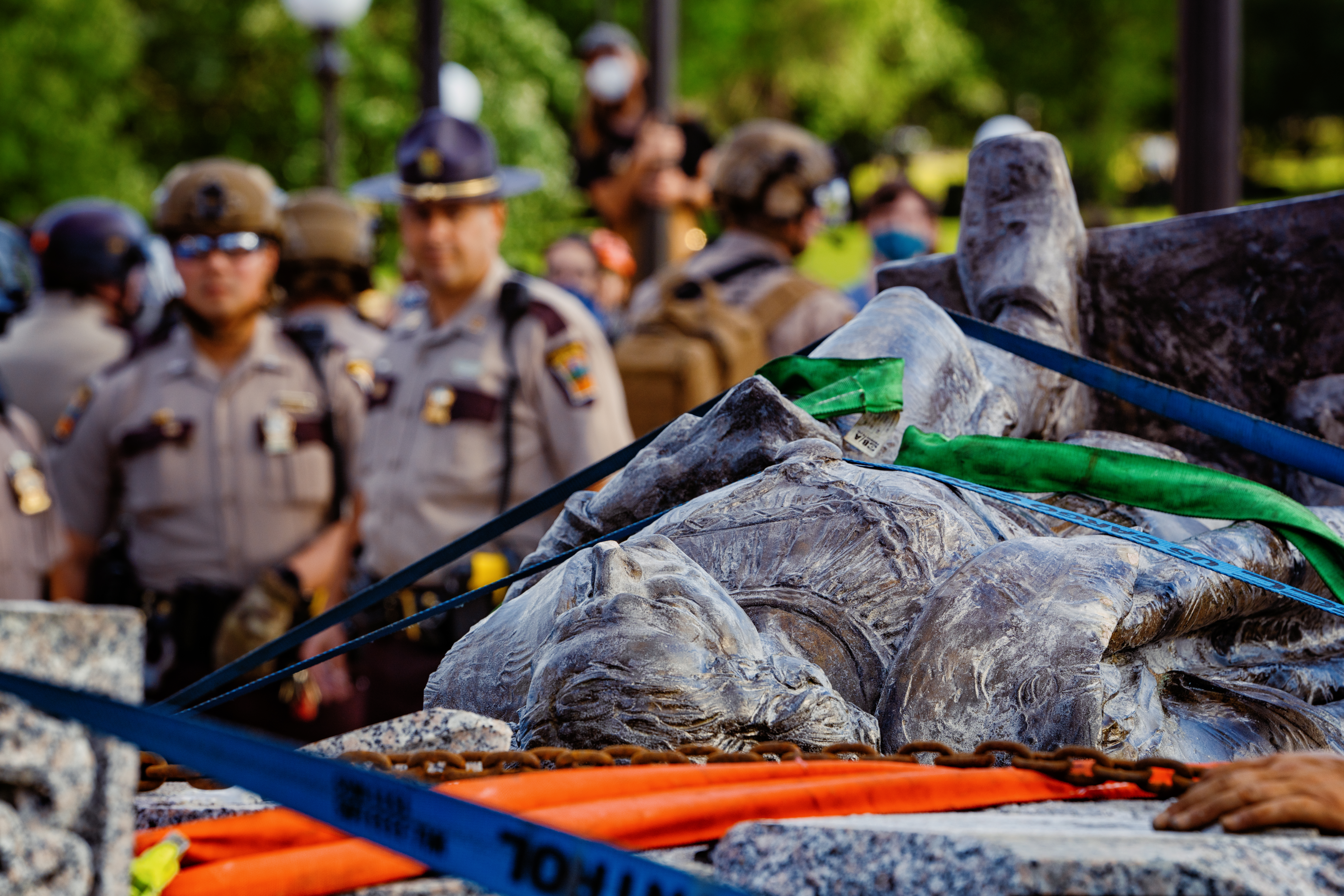
The toppled statue on June 10, 2020

Members of the American Indian Movement, led by Mike Forcia of the Bad River Band of the Lake Superior Tribe of Chippewa Indians, announced via social media their intentions to topple the statue on June 10. Governor Tim Walz addressed the plans during a news conference and Public Safety Commissioner John Harrington announced that the Minnesota State Patrol would meet with the protesters and seek an alternative resolution.

State Patrol troopers and a Department of Public Safety tribal liaison met with organizers prior to the event, encouraging them to follow a legal process for removal and warning them that they could face charges for destruction of public property. Forcia countered that they had already waited far too long, having worked through official channels for years without success.

Members of the American Indian Movement of Twin Cities joined residents, including Dakota and Ojibwe community members at the northeastern corner of the Capitol Mall. They looped a rope around the statue and pulled it off its granite pedestal. The group drummed, sang songs, and took photos with the fallen statue. No one was arrested at the event. State Patrol troopers watched from a distance and did not intervene. Troopers eventually formed a line to protect the statue before it was transported offsite.

Michael Forcia, a Ramsey County resident, was charged with first-degree damage to property, which could have resulted in a penalty of up to five years in jail and a fine of up to $10,000. In December, he agreed to a plea deal and accepted 100 hours in community service in connection with the incident. Officials estimated the cost to repair the statue would be over $154,000.

==== Reactions ====
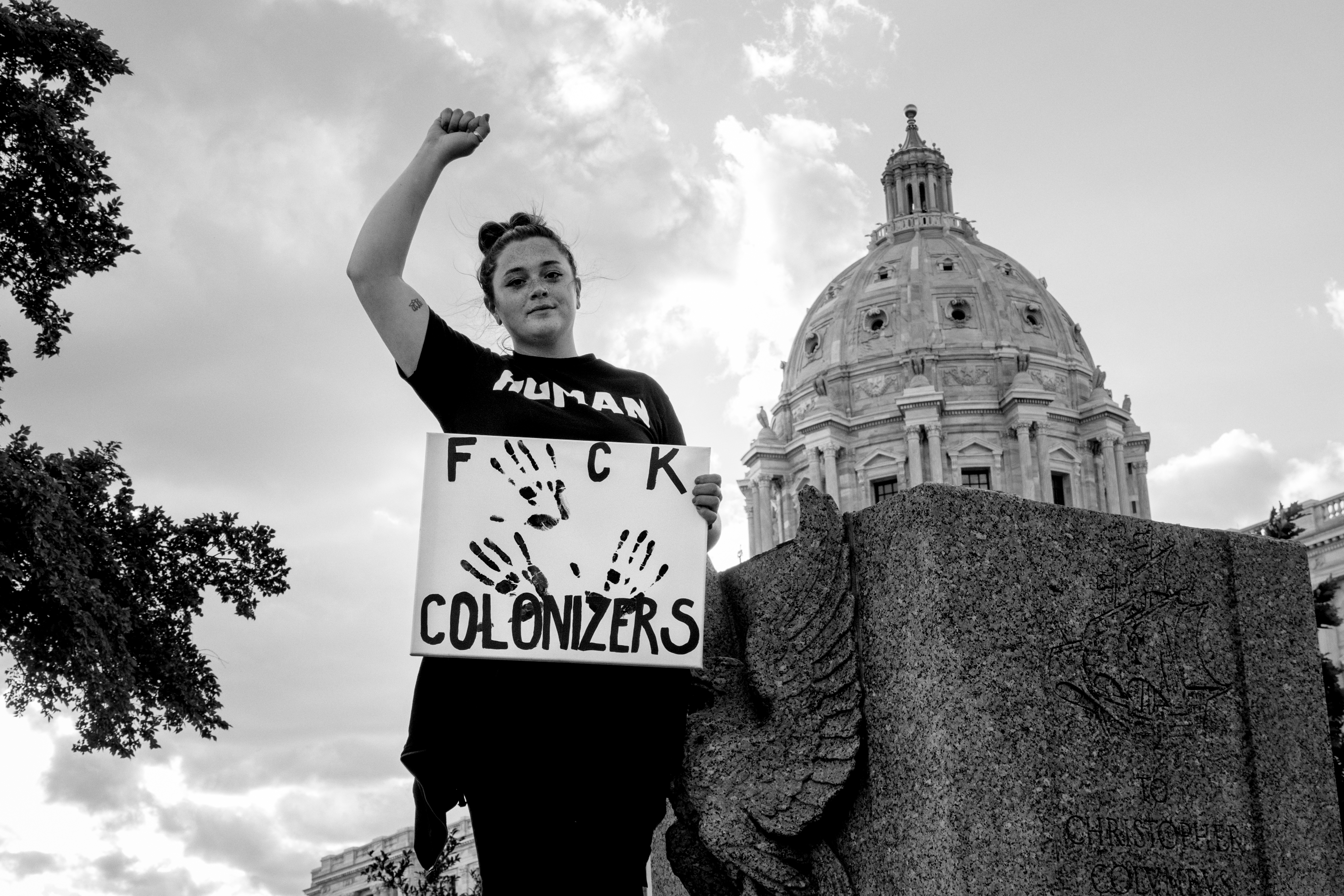
A demonstrator raises a fist next to the empty pedestal

Governor Walz said he did not condone the action, calling it a dangerous act for which there would be consequences. Lieutenant Governor Peggy Flanagan, a member of the White Earth Band of Ojibwe, previously co-authored a bill to remove the statue when she served in the Minnesota legislature. Flanagan indicated she was not sad that the statue was gone, saying "I will not shed a tear over the loss of a statue that honored someone who by his own admission sold nine- and 10-year-old girls into sex slavery." Republican politicians Paul Gazelka, Jim Nash, and Steve Drazkowski condemned the failure to protect the statue, with Drazkowski calling the act a "lynching-like desecration."

=== Fate ===
The statue suffered minimal damage in its fall and was removed to an undisclosed location. It is in the possession of the Capitol Area Architectural and Planning Board, which is responsible for its fate. It is unknown whether the statue will be returned to the Capitol grounds. Paul Mandell, a member of the board, said "we don't have any process for how to handle removals; we've never done this before." Mandell had previously said that removing a statue would break a promise to the organization that devoted time and money to erect it. On March 10, 2021, it was announced that a senate committee had voted to restore the statue. The measure was then sent to the Republican-controlled senate, where its future will be debated. If the senate votes for restoration it could take 3 years for the statue to be fully restored, including a possible cost of up to $400,000. The Capitol Area Architectural and Planning Board is in the middle of a two-year review process to decide how they want to handle removing statues and monuments; until this plan is reviewed by an administrative law judge in January 2022, the Columbus statue will remain in storage.

== See also ==
- 1931 in art
- 2020–2023 Minneapolis–Saint Paul racial unrest
- List of monuments and memorials to Christopher Columbus
