= Vernon Bellecourt =

Native American rights activist (1931–2007)

- Bellecourt ca. 1970s
- Born: October 17, 1931; White Earth Indian Reservation
- Died: October 13, 2007 (aged 75); Minneapolis, Minnesota
- Other name: WaBun-Inini
- Citizenship: White Earth Band of Ojibwe
- Known for: American Indian Movement leader
- Relatives: Clyde Bellecourt (brother)

Vernon Bellecourt (WaBun-Inini) (October 17, 1931 – October 13, 2007) was a member of the White Earth Band of Ojibwe (located in Minnesota), a Native American rights activist, and a leader in the American Indian Movement (AIM). In the Ojibwe language, his name meant "Man of Dawn."

== Biography ==
=== Early years ===
One of 12 children in his family, Bellecourt was born on the White Earth Indian Reservation, where he lived until he was 16 years old. In 1947 his family moved to the city of Minneapolis, where his parents sought better opportunities for themselves and their children. When Bellecourt was 19, he was convicted of robbing a Minneapolis–Saint Paul tavern and sentenced to time in St. Cloud prison.

At his release, he started working as a hairdresser and opened a series of beauty salons in Saint Paul. He married and had children with his wife. In the mid 1960s, he sold his business and moved his family near Aspen, Colorado.

=== American Indian Movement ===
Bellecourt was a long-time leader in the American Indian Movement, which his younger brother, Clyde Bellecourt, helped found in 1968. Vernon soon became involved as well. He co-founded the AIM chapter in Denver, and was its first Executive Director. It worked in urban areas to ensure civil rights for American Indians, as well as to educate people about their cultural and spiritual heritage.

In August 1972, Bellecourt and three other trustees of the Denver-based Golden Indian Bread Foundation sued in Denver District Court to block the premiere of When the Legends Die, a 20th Century Fox adaptation of Hal Borland's novel about a young Ute man, at the Esquire Theatre. The screening had been advertised as a benefit for the foundation without its consent. Bellecourt called the film "another exploitation by 20th Century-Fox." Judge James Flanigan denied the request for a temporary restraining order on August 25, 1972, and the premiere went ahead.

Bellecourt took part in the 1972 Trail of Broken Treaties caravan to Washington, DC. He served as a negotiator during AIM's occupation of the Bureau of Indian Affairs headquarters building at the Department of Interior. Bellecourt was present briefly during the 1973 Wounded Knee occupation at Pine Ridge Indian Reservation in South Dakota. He acted as an AIM spokesman and fundraiser during the 71-day standoff with federal agents.

After Wounded Knee, Bellecourt worked with the International Indian Treaty Council, which advocates on behalf of indigenous rights throughout the Western Hemisphere. He became a leader of AIM's work abroad, meeting with foreign leaders such as Daniel Ortega of Nicaragua, Muammar al-Gaddafi of Libya, and Palestine Liberation Organization chairman Yasser Arafat. He also traveled to Germany, where he, together with AIM co-founder Dennis Banks, set up an AIM office in West Berlin and also traveled behind the Iron Curtain to meet with East German AIM supporters.

Bellecourt was active for many years in the campaign to free AIM activist Leonard Peltier, who was convicted in 1977 of killing two FBI agents during a 1975 shootout on the Pine Ridge Reservation. Peltier's two life sentences were commuted to home confinement in 2025.

=== Sports mascots and nicknames ===
As president of the National Coalition on Racism in Sports and Media, Bellecourt worked to end the unauthorized use of American Indian tribal land nicknames in American sports. Bellecourt fought against nicknames such as the Washington Redskins, Atlanta Braves or Kansas City Chiefs. He was arrested twice in Cleveland in protest of the Cleveland Indians' mascot, Chief Wahoo. During the 1997 World Series Bellecourt was arrested for setting fire to a stuffed doll of Chief Wahoo while protesting outside of Jacobs Field. Charges against him were dropped. Bellecourt was arrested in 1998 but was not charged.

=== Final days ===
In August 2007, Bellecourt accepted an invitation from the Venezuelan government to attend the First International Congress of Anti-imperialist Indigenous Peoples of America. He met with President Hugo Chavez in Venezuela. The two discussed the possibility of Chavez' providing aid to Native American groups.

According to his brother Clyde, Bellecourt fell ill soon after the trip and was hospitalized. He died of pneumonia at age 75, in Minneapolis where he lived.

== See also ==
- Native American mascot controversy
