= Laura Waterman Wittstock =

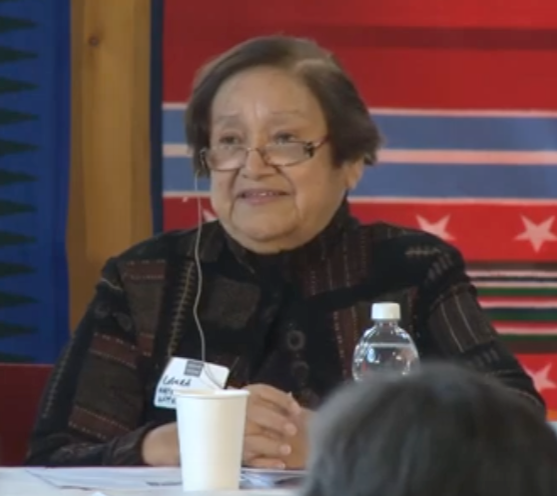
- Moderating a panel discussion in 2013
- Born: September 11, 1937; Cattaraugus Reservation, New York, United States
- Died: January 16, 2021 (aged 83)
- Occupations: Activist, journalist, writer and radio producer
- Employer(s): National Indian Education Association; American Indian Press Association
- Children: 5

Laura Waterman Wittstock (September 11, 1937 – January 16, 2021) was a Seneca journalist, writer and radio producer. She was also an activist for Indigenous rights, civil rights and women's rights.

== Family and early life ==
Wittstock was born in 1937 on the Cattaraugus Reservation in New York. She was a citizen of the Haudenosaunee Seneca Nation and a member of the Heron clan.

Wittstock's parents were Isaac "Jack" Waterman and Clarinda "Cleo" Waterman (née Jackson). She had four elder brothers, William Waterman, Kenneth Waterman, Arthur Waterman and Arnold Waterman.

As a child, Wittstock lived in Hawaii with her brother William. She became interested in writing and one of her poems was published in the National Education Association Journal.

== Career ==
Wittstock moved to Minneapolis in 1973. She worked with the National Indian Education Association applying for grants to fund Little Red School House. At the school she introduced history projects and learning the Ojibwe language at lunchtimes. Also in 1973, Wittstock contributed an article title "The Bureau of Indian Affairs: Its Origins and Current Activities" to the Civil Rights Digest.

After moving to Washington D.C., Wittstock worked as a journalist with Richard LaCourse of the Yakama Nation. Wittstock was editor of The Legislative Review, a Native American political journal, and also worked as a professional copywriter. In 1974, Wittstock founded MIGIZI Communications with a group of journalists, to "counter media inaccuracies and misrepresentations of Native people." She later served as President of MIGIZI from 1986 to 2004.

In 1975, Wittstock was invited to be a panelist for the United Nations (UN) International Women’s Year World Conference on Women held in Mexico City, Mexico. That year she also became Executive Director of the American Indian Press Association. In this period, Wittstock was also active in women’s advocacy work for the Women’s Educational Equity Act (WEEA) Advisory Board and was elected to the Minneapolis Library Board and Greater Metropolitan Housing Corporation (GMHC).

In 1983, Wittstock was appointed to the National Commission on Alcoholism and Alcohol Problems by President Jimmy Carter.

In 1993, Wittstock published the book Ininatig’s Gift of Sugar: Traditional Sugarmaking to preserve traditional knowledge. With a grant from the Minnesota Historical Society, she also produced the book We are Still Here: A photographic history of the American Indian Movement, which recounted the 1972 national protest of the American Indian Movement (AIM) and what activists referred to as the Trail of Broken Treaties, using the photographs of Dick Bancroft.

In 2010, Wittstock resurrected the cancelled First Person Radio, producing and presenting a weekly one-hour Indian current events program on KFAI (AM). She invited guests onto the program including Chief Arvol Looking Horse and lawyers Walter R. Echo-Hawk and John Echohawk. In 2011, she was presented with the Farr Award for "exceptional contribution to public affairs journalism" by the University of Minnesota. Wittstock ran the First Person Radio program for eight years, before retiring due to ill health.

== Personal life ==
Wittstock was married twice, to Olivera Simas and Floyd Wittstock, and had five children.

== Death ==
Wittstock died on January 16, 2021, aged 83.
