= Heart of the Earth Survival School =

Heart of the Earth/Oh Day Aki

Location
- 1209 4th Street Southeast; Minneapolis, Minnesota 55414; United States

Information
- Established: 1972
- Closed: 2008
- School district: Minneapolis Public Schools
- Principal: Dr. Darlene Leiding
- Staff: 7 (as of 2007–08)
- Teaching staff: 19.7 (FTE) (as of 2007–08)
- Grades: K-12
- Enrollment: 192 (as of 2007–08)
- Student to teacher ratio: 9.7 (as of 2007–08)
- Colors: Red, Black, and White
- Team name: Eagles

Heart of the Earth School was founded in 1972 in Minneapolis, Minnesota by the American Indian Movement to serve urban Native American students as an alternative to both area public schools and federal schools provided by the Bureau of Indian Affairs. AIM classified it as a Native American "survival school", intending to help students take pride in their people, learn survival skills, and negotiate the difficulties of urban settings. It served students in K-12, kindergarten through twelfth grade. Initially holding classes in temporary spaces, the school received federal grants that enabled it to secure permanent space and expand its programs.

This was at a height of Native American activism, as tribes and Indian-affiliated groups worked to increase tribal sovereignty and control over their futures. AIM founded the Red School House, another survival school, in neighboring St. Paul, Minnesota in this same period. From 1999 Heart of the Earth School operated as a charter school in the Minneapolis Public School District. In 2008, the city ended its sponsorship after discovery of financial irregularities. After the former executive director was convicted of embezzlement, the school closed in 2010.

== History ==
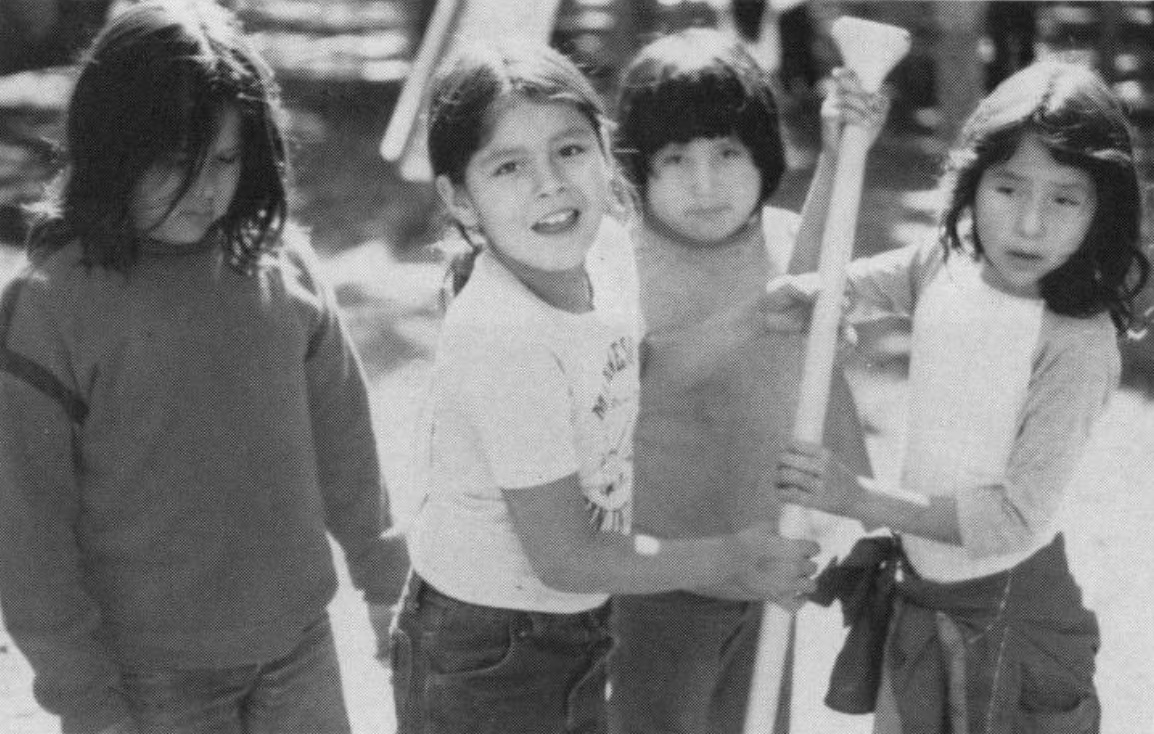
Students on a field trip to learn to harvest wild rice

Heart of the Earth Survival School was established in January 1972 by members of the American Indian Movement.

AIM was able to found the school because of authorization in Title VII of the Indian Education Act, adopted by Congress on June 23, 1972. This act allowed Indians to have control over educating their people. Previously the federal government had administered most schools on reservations as part of treaty obligations; many of these, and also off-reservation schools, were set up as boarding schools because of the large, rural territories that most reservations occupied. The Indian boarding schools dominated federal Indian education from the late 19th through the mid-20th centuries, when tens of thousands of children were attending.

In 1999, Heart of the Earth/Oh Day Aki satisfied criteria to be classified as a charter school in Minneapolis Public School System.

Minneapolis Public Schools ended the district's sponsorship of the school in August 2008 after an audit revealed more than $160,000 in financial discrepancies.

In 2010, the former executive director of the school, Joel Pourier, was sentenced to 10 years in prison after being convicted of stealing more than a million dollars from the school. The school was forced to close.

== Campus ==
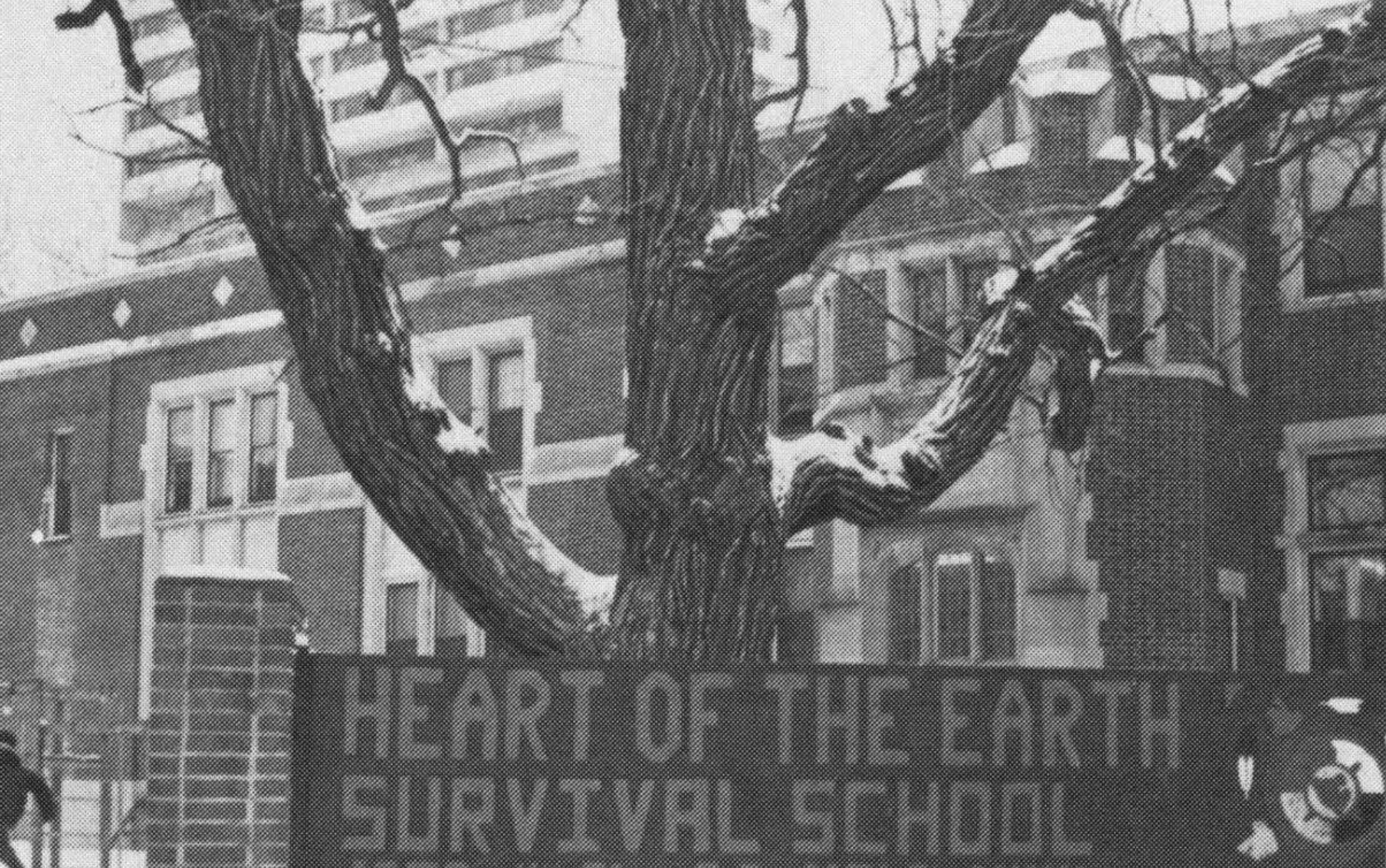
The school as pictured in its 1983 yearbook

The school's location on 4th Street Southeast was located in the Dinkytown district of the Marcy-Holmes neighborhood of Minneapolis.

== Curriculum ==
AIM established the "survival schools" as an alternatives to both public schools in the cities and Bureau of Indian Affairs schools, offered most commonly to Indian communities on reservations. Survival schools provided language instruction in native languages, such as the Ojibwe and Lakota spoken by many tribal members in this region. Even basic courses were centered on tribal cultures.

The founders of Heart of the Earth wanted to teach Indian children living in cities about disappearing traditional life skills, such as "hunting, fishing, maple syrup gathering and wild rice harvesting." They wanted to help Indian students identify with their cultures, as they had been discriminated against, with their cultures denigrated in other settings.

Initially, the school provided practical jobs training for Indian students who would not pursue higher education. Later, as a charter school named Oh Day Aki, the school provided a unique opportunity for Indian students to explore their cultures in a school setting, while simultaneously preparing for higher education and self-sufficiency.

== Extracurricular activities ==
Oh Day Aki Charter School's athletic teams, known as the Eagles, competed in the Minnesota State High School League, Class A, Section 4. The school fielded teams in baseball, basketball, cross country, softball, track, and volleyball.
