= American Indian Movement =

American Indian civil rights organization

- Abbreviation: AIM
- Leader: Dennis Banks; Clyde Bellecourt; Vernon Bellecourt; Russell Means
- Founded: July 1968; 58 years ago
- Ideology: American Indian civil rights Indigenism; Pan-Indianism; Anti-racism; Anti-imperialism; Libertarianism (faction)
- Political position: Left-wing
- National affiliation: Rainbow Coalition
- Colors: Black Gold White Maroon

Website
- aimovement.org

The American Indian Movement (AIM) is an American Indian grassroots movement founded in Minneapolis in July 1968. Initially centered in urban areas to address systemic issues of poverty, discrimination, and police brutality against American Indians, AIM soon widened its scope to many Indigenous Tribal issues that American Indian groups have faced due to settler colonialism in the Americas. These issues have included treaty rights, high rates of unemployment, the lack of American Indian subjects in education, and the preservation of Indigenous cultures.

AIM was organized by Native American men who had been serving time together in prison. Some of the experiences that Native men in AIM shared were boarding school education, military service, and the disorienting urban experience.

They had been alienated from their traditional backgrounds as a result of the United States' Public Law 959 Indian Relocation Act of 1956, which supported thousands of American Indians who wanted to move from reservations to cities, in an attempt to enable them to have more economic opportunities for work. In addition, Public Law 280, one of the first major laws contributing to U.S. Indian termination policy, proposed to terminate the federal government's relations with several tribes which were determined to be far along the path of assimilation. These policies were enacted by the United States Congress under its plenary power. As a result, nearly 70% of American Indians left their communal homelands on reservations and relocated to urban centers, many in hopes of finding economic sustainability. While many Urban Indians struggled with displacement and such radically different settings, some also began to organize in pan-Indian groups in urban centers. They were described as transnationals. The American Indian Movement formed in such urbanized contexts at a time of increasing Indian activism.

From November 1969 to June 1971, AIM participated in the occupation of the abandoned federal penitentiary on Alcatraz Island organized by seven Indian movements, including the Indians of All Tribes and Richard Oakes, a Mohawk activist. In October 1972, AIM and other Indian groups gathered members from across the United States for a protest in Washington, D.C., known as the Trail of Broken Treaties. Public documents obtained under the Freedom of Information Act (FOIA) reveal advanced coordination occurred between federal Bureau of Indian Affairs staff and the authors of a twenty-point proposal. The proposal was drafted with the help of the AIM for delivery to the United States government officials. Its focused on proposals intended to enhance U.S.–Indian relations.

In the decades since AIM's founding, the group has led protests advocating indigenous American interests, inspired cultural renewal, monitored police activities, and coordinated employment programs in cities and in rural reservation communities across the United States. They have also allied with indigenous interests outside the United States.

== Background ==
=== 1950s ===
A U.S. government policy directive from 1940 to the early 1960s, under multiple executive administrations (both Democrat and Republican), led to the establishment of uranium mining operations across Navajo tribal lands. These operations often provided the only employment opportunities for Navajo people in isolated areas, and Navajo workers were initially enthusiastic about employment. The U.S. government, though, appears to have known about the harmful risks associated with uranium mining since the 1930s but neglected to inform the Navajo communities. In addition, most Navajo workers did not speak English. They had no knowledge of radiation, nor a translation for the word in their language.

Both the open and other now abandoned uranium mines continue to poison and pollute the land, water, and air of Navajo communities today. Clean-up has been slow even after environmental laws were passed and the dangers assessed. As a result, the Navajo people believe that the federal government has violated the Treaty of 1868, which assigned the Bureau of Indian Affairs to provide services that safeguard their health.

=== 1960s ===
On March 6, 1968, President Lyndon B. Johnson signed Executive Order 11399, establishing the National Council on Indian Opportunity (NCIO). President Johnson announced in his Special Message to the Congress on the Problems of the American Indian, "[T]he time has come to focus our efforts on the plight of the American Indian," and that the NCIO's formation would "launch an undivided, Government-wide effort in this area." Johnson tried to connect the nation's trust responsibility to the tribes and nations to contemporary African American civil rights issues, an area with which he was much more familiar.

In Congress, the chairman of the House Subcommittee on Indian Affairs, James Haley (D-FL), supported Indian rights. He thought that Indians should participate more in "policy matters," but he also believed that "the right of self-determination is in the Congress as a representative of all the people." In the 1960s, Haley met with President John F. Kennedy and Vice President Johnson, urging them to support Indian self-determination and control in transactions over their communal lands. One struggle was over the long-term leasing of American Indian land.

Non-Indian businesses and banks said they could not invest in leases of 25 years, even with generous options, as the time was too short for land-based transactions. Leasing land through business partnerships to relieve long-term poverty on most reservations was considered infeasible but returning to the 99-year lease from the 19th century was seen as a possible solution. However, an Interior Department memo said, "a 99-year lease is in the nature of a conveyance of the land". These battles over land had their beginnings in the 1870s when federal policy often related to wholesale taking, not leases. In the 1950s, many American Indians believed that leases had become too frequently a way for outsiders to control Indian land.

Wallace "Mad Bear" Anderson (Tuscarora) was a leader in central New York in the 1950s. He struggled to resist the New York City planner Robert Moses' plan to take tribal land in upstate New York for use in a state hydropower project to supply New York City. The struggle ended in a bitter compromise.

=== Initial movement ===
AIM, like civil rights and antiwar activists, used the American press and media to convey its message to the United States public, creating events to capture the attention of the press. If successful, news outlets would seek out AIM spokespersons for interviews. Rather than relying on traditional lobbying efforts, AIM took its message directly to the American public. Its leaders looked for opportunities to gain publicity. Sound bites such as the AIM Song became associated with the movement.

== Key figures ==
- Dennis J. Banks was an Ojibwe tribal member who co-founded AIM in Minneapolis, Minnesota 1968. He became one of the more recognizable face of the American Indian Movement.
- Russell Means was a member of the Oglala Lakota tribe from the Pineridge Reservation. He collaborated with Banks to formulate AIM and is also a central leader to the movement.
- Leonard Peltier is enrolled in the turtle band Chippewa tribe in North Dakota, but is Lakota/Dakota as well. Leonard Peltier was an organizer and activist in AIM. He was convicted of killing two FBI agents. Peltier was released from federal prison in 2025 on the condition he abide by home confinement.

== Events ==
During ceremonies on Thanksgiving Day 1970 to commemorate the 350th anniversary of the Pilgrims' landing at Plymouth Rock, an AIM group seized the replica of the Mayflower in Boston. In 1971, members occupied Mount Rushmore for a few days. This huge sculpture was created on a mountain long considered sacred by the Lakota, and the associated land in the Black Hills of South Dakota was taken by the federal government after gold was discovered there. This area was originally within the Great Sioux Reservation as created by the Treaty of Fort Laramie in 1868, which covered most of present-day South Dakota west of the Missouri River. After the discovery of gold in 1874, the federal government broke up the large reservation and sold off much of the Black Hills to European Americans for mining and settlement. It reassigned several Lakota tribes to five smaller reservations in this area.

Native American activists in Milwaukee staged a takeover of an abandoned Coast Guard station along Lake Michigan. The takeover was inspired by the 1969 Alcatraz occupation. Activists cited the Treaty of Fort Laramie and demanded the abandoned federal property revert to the control of the Native peoples of Milwaukee. AIM protestors retained possession of the land, and the land became the site of the first Indian Community School, which operated until 1980.

Also in 1971, AIM began to highlight and protest problems with the Bureau of Indian Affairs (BIA), which administered programs and land trusts for Native Americans. The group briefly occupied BIA headquarters in Washington, D.C. A brief arrest, reversal of charges for "unlawful entry" and a meeting with Louis Bruce (Mohawk/Lakota), the BIA Commissioner, ended AIM's first event in the capital. In 1972, activists marched across the country on the "Trail of Broken Treaties" and took over the Department of Interior headquarters, including the Bureau of Indian Affairs (BIA), occupying it for several days and allegedly doing millions of dollars in damage.

AIM developed the Twenty Points, to summarize its issues with federal treaties and promises, which they publicized during their occupation in 1972. The list was largely written by the Native American activist and strategist Hank Adams. Twelve points addressed treaty responsibilities which the protesters believed the U.S. government had failed to fulfill:

- Restore treaty-making (ended by Congress in 1871).
- Establish a treaty commission to make new treaties (with sovereign Native Nations).
- Provide opportunities for Indian leaders to address Congress directly.
- Review treaty commitments and violations.
- Have unratified treaties reviewed by the Senate.
- Ensure that all American Indians are governed by treaty relations.
- Provide relief to Native Nations as compensation for treaty rights violations.
- Recognize the right of Indians to interpret treaties.
- Create a Joint Congressional Committee to reconstruct relations with Indians.
- Restore 110 million acres (450,000 km^{2}) of land taken away from Native Nations by the United States.
- Restore terminated rights of Native Nations.
- Repeal state jurisdiction on Native Nations (Public Law 280).
- Provide Federal protection for offenses against Indians.
- Abolish the Bureau of Indian Affairs.
- Create a new office of Federal Indian Relations.
- Remedy breakdown in the constitutionally prescribed relationships between the United States and Native Nations.
- Ensure immunity of Native Nations from state commerce regulation, taxes, and trade restrictions.
- Protect Indian religious freedom and cultural integrity.
- Establish national Indian voting with local options; free national Indian organizations from governmental controls.
- Reclaim and affirm health, housing, employment, economic development, and education for all Indian people.

In 1973, AIM was invited to the Pine Ridge Indian Reservation to help gain justice from border counties' law enforcement and to moderate political factions on the reservation. They became deeply involved and led an armed occupation of Wounded Knee on the Pine Ridge Indian Reservation in 1973. During the 71-day long occupation at Wounded Knee, the occupiers declared the Independent Oglala Nation, a nation separate from the United States and set up a warrior society. During the occupation, women also took up arms to defend the hamlet.

Other events in the 1970s were designed to gain public attention, ensuring that AIM would be noticed and highlighting what they saw as the erosion of Indian rights and sovereignty.

On June 10, 2020, AIM Twin Cities (a splinter group from the original AIM) members tore down the Christopher Columbus statue located outside the Minnesota State Capitol. Once a widely celebrated explorer credited with discovering America, Columbus later became recognized for the atrocities he and his followers committed against natives during their American voyages. Self-declared AIM member Mike Forcia admitted to speaking with Minnesota Governor Tim Walz and Lieutenant Governor Peggy Flanagan (a member of White Earth Nation) before the event took place. The Grand Governing Council dismissed Forcia's actions as they affected their stance on peaceful grassroots initiatives and clarified his role in the splinter group.

AIM conducted patrols in Minneapolis to protect Indigenous community members and monitor ICE activity during Operation Metro Surge.

=== The Longest Walk (1978) ===
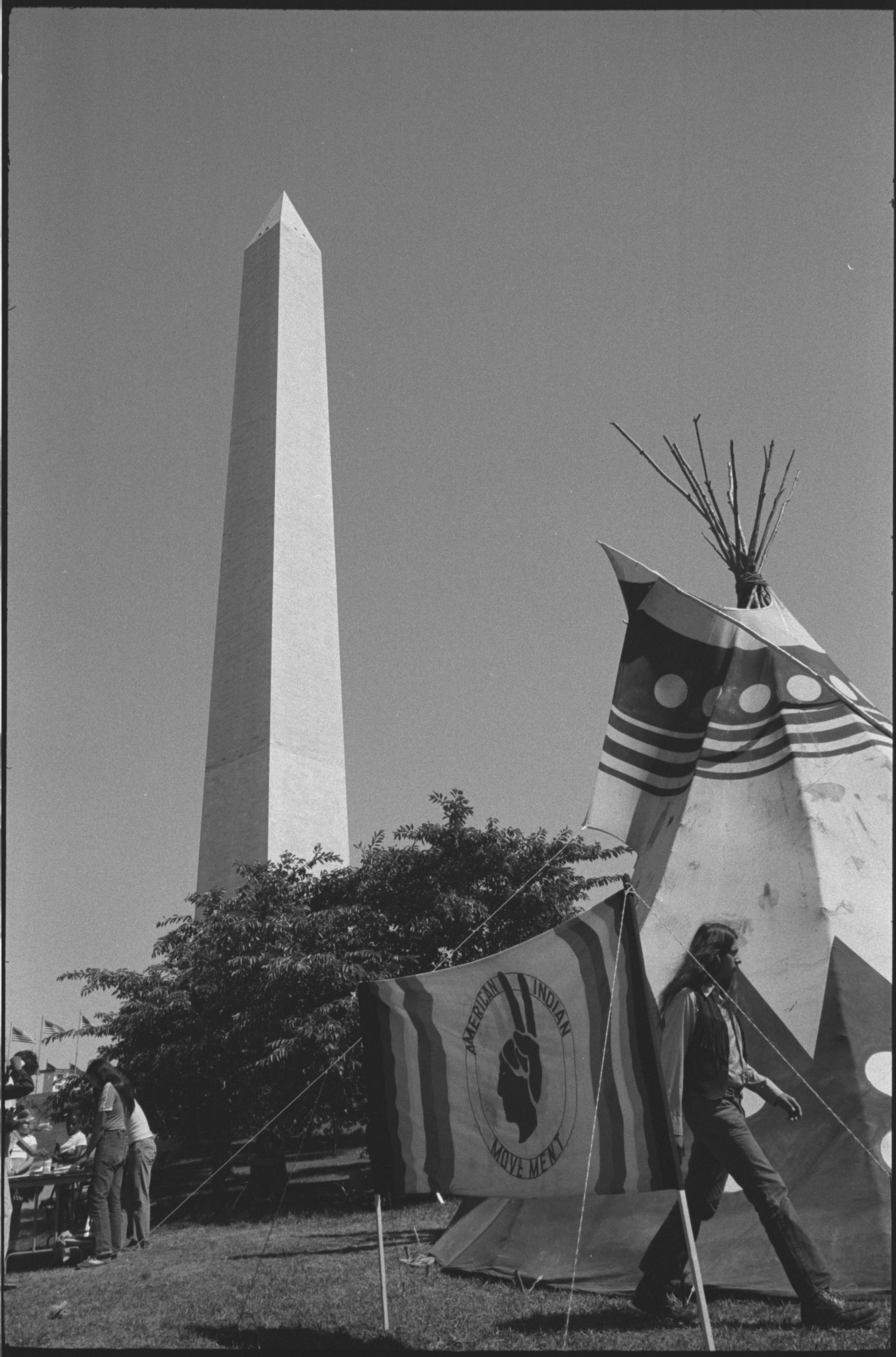
An American Indian Movement tipi on the grounds of the Washington Monument in 1978

The Longest Walk (1978) was an AIM-led spiritual walk across the country to support tribal sovereignty and bring attention to a series of proposed federal bills that AIM asserted would abrogate Indian Treaties, threaten land and water rights and cut off social services. The purpose of this 3,200-mile (5,100 km) walk was to educate people about the government's continuing threat to tribal sovereignty; it rallied thousands representing many Indian nations throughout the United States and Canada. Traditional spiritual leaders from many tribes participated, leading traditional ceremonies. Non-Indian supporters included the American boxer Muhammad Ali, U.S. Senator Ted Kennedy, and the actor Marlon Brando. International spiritual leaders like Nichidatsu Fujii also took part in the Walk.

The first walk began on February 11, 1978, with a ceremony on Alcatraz Island, where a sacred pipe was loaded with tobacco. The pipe was carried the entire distance. On July 15, 1978, The Longest Walk entered Washington, D.C., with several thousand Indians and a number of non-Indian supporters. The traditional elders led them to the Washington Monument, where the pipe that had been carried across the country was smoked. Over the next week, they held rallies at various locations to address issues, including the series of proposed federal bills, American Indian political prisoners, forced relocation at Big Mountain, and the Navajo Nation.

President Jimmy Carter refused to meet with representatives of The Longest Walk. However, Congress withdrew the proposed series of bills opposed by the activists. Instead, they passed the American Indian Religious Freedom Act, which protected the rights of Native Americans to exercise their traditional religions and to worship through ceremonials and traditional rites. To a lesser extent, this also allowed the use of peyote in worship for the Native American Church (NAC).

=== The Longest Walk 2 (2008) ===
Thirty years later, AIM led the Longest Walk 2, which covered 8,200 miles (13,200 km) starting from the San Francisco Bay area and arriving in Washington, D.C. in July 2008. The Longest Walk 2 had representatives from more than 100 American Indian nations, and other indigenous participants, such as Maori. It also had non-indigenous supporters. The walk highlighted the need for protection of American Indian sacred sites, tribal sovereignty, environmental protection, and action to stop global warming. Participants traveled on either the Northern Route (basically that of 1978) or the Southern Route. Participants crossed a total of 26 states on the two different routes.

==== Northern Route ====
The Northern Route was led by veterans of that action. The walkers used sacred staffs to represent their issues; the group supported the protection of sacred sites of indigenous peoples, traditional tribal sovereignty, issues related to native prisoners, and the protection of children. They also commemorated the 30th anniversary of the original Longest Walk.

==== Southern Route ====
Walkers along the Southern Route picked up more than 8,000 bags of garbage on their way to Washington. In Washington, the Southern Route delivered a 30-page manifesto, "The Manifesto of Change", and a list of demands, including mitigation for climate change, a call for environmental sustainability plans, protection of sacred sites, and renewal of improvement to Native American sovereignty and health.

=== Free Leonard Peltier (2025) ===
Several AIM elders would appear in the 2025 documentary Free Leonard Peltier, which involved discussion about the AIM's intentions and the effort to free former AIM activist Leonard Peltier from prison. The documentary premiered at the 2025 Sundance Film Festival.

== Relationship with other civil rights movements ==
AIM's leaders drew inspiration from the African American leaders of the Civil Rights Movement as they spoke out against injustices towards their people. They addressed issues such as high unemployment, slum housing, and racist treatment. They also fought for treaty rights and the reclamation of tribal land and advocated on behalf of urban Indians.

In response to its provocative events and its advocacy of Indian rights, the Department of Justice (DOJ) scrutinized the AIM. The Federal Bureau of Investigation (FBI) used paid informants to report on the AIM's activities and members.

In February 1973, AIM leaders Russell Means, Dennis Banks, and other AIM activists occupied the small Indian community of Wounded Knee, South Dakota, on the Pine Ridge Reservation. They were protesting what they said was the corrupt local government, federal issues affecting Indian reservation communities, and the lack of justice in border counties. American Indians from many other communities, primarily urban Indians, rallied to come and participate in the occupation. The FBI dispatched agents and U.S. Marshals to cordon off the site. Later a higher-ranking DOJ representative took control of the government's response. During the 71-day siege, twelve people were wounded, and an FBI agent was left paralyzed. In April, a Cherokee and a Lakota activist were killed by gunfire. At this point, the Oglala Lakota called an end to the occupation. Additionally, two other people went missing during the occupation and are believed to have been killed, although their bodies have never been found. One of the missing was African American civil rights activist Ray Robinson. Afterward, 1200 American Indians were arrested.

Wounded Knee drew international attention to the plight of American Indians. AIM leaders were tried in a Minnesota federal court. The court dismissed their case on the basis of governmental prosecutorial misconduct. In 2014, the FBI confirmed that Robinson had been killed and buried on the reservation in April 1973 after AIM members allegedly killed him during an argument.

In January 1985, members of AIM and the Heart of the Earth School in Minneapolis travelled to Belfast in Northern Ireland to pay their respects to fallen Irish republican hunger strikers at Milltown Cemetery. AIM activists laid a wreath at the commemoration, where Floyd "Red Crow" Westerman was reported to be in attendance, along with Sinn Féin leader Gerry Adams and the parents of hunger striker Kieran Doherty. The following year, an AIM delegation travelled to Wales to commemorate Alwyn Jones and George Taylor, often referred to by Welsh nationalists as "the Abergele Martyrs", who were killed in 1969 when a bomb they were planting to protest the investiture of Prince Charles detonated prematurely. Mark Banks, brother of Dennis Banks, placed tobacco offerings on the graves of the two members of Mudiad Amddiffyn Cymru (MAC) and requested that in return a Welsh representative travel to pay respects to AIM members killed during the siege of Wounded Knee, whom he described as "fallen AIM dead patriots".

== History ==
=== AIM protests ===
AIM opposes national and collegiate sports teams using figures of indigenous people as mascots and team names, such as the Cleveland Indians, the Atlanta Braves, the Chicago Blackhawks, the Kansas City Chiefs and the Washington Redskins and has organized protests at World Series and Super Bowl games against these teams. Protesters held signs with slogans such as "Indians are people not mascots". or "Being Indian is not a character you can play". Subsequently, Cleveland and Washington have changed their team names.

Although sports teams had ignored such requests by individual tribes for years, AIM received attention in the mascot debate. NCAA schools such as Florida State University, University of Utah, University of Illinois and Central Michigan University have negotiated with the tribes whose names or images they had used for permission for continued use and to collaborate on portraying the mascot in a way that is intended to honor Native Americans.

=== Goals and commitments ===
AIM has been committed to improving conditions faced by native peoples. It founded institutions to address needs, including the Heart of the Earth School, Little Earth Housing, International Indian Treaty Council, AIM StreetMedics, American Indian Opportunities and Industrialization Center (one of the largest Indian job training programs), KILI radio and Indian Legal Rights Centers.

In 1971, several members of AIM, including Dennis Banks and Russell Means, travelled to Mount Rushmore. They converged at the mountain in order to protest the illegal seizure of the Sioux Nation's sacred Black Hills in 1877 by the United States federal government, in violation of its earlier 1868 Treaty of Fort Laramie. The protest began to publicize the issues of the American Indian Movement. In 1980, the Supreme Court ruled that the federal government had illegally taken the Black Hills. The government offered financial compensation, but the Oglala Sioux have refused it, insisting on return of the land to their people. The settlement money is earning interest.

== Work on the Pine Ridge Indian Reservation ==
=== Border town cases ===
In 1972, Raymond Yellow Thunder, a 51-year-old Oglala Lakota from Pine Ridge Reservation, was murdered in Gordon, Nebraska, by two brothers, Leslie and Melvin Hare, younger white men. After their trial and conviction, the Hares received the minimal sentence for manslaughter. Members of AIM went to Gordon to protest the sentences, arguing they were part of a pattern of law enforcement that did not provide justice to Native Americans in counties and communities bordering Indian reservations.

In the winter of 1973, Wesley Bad Heart Bull, a Lakota, was stabbed to death at a bar in South Dakota by Darrell Schmitz, a white male. The offender was jailed but released on a $5,000 bond and charged with second degree manslaughter. Believing the charges to be too lenient, a group of AIM members and leaders from Pine Ridge Reservation and leaders travelled to the county seat of Custer, South Dakota, to meet with the prosecutor. Police in riot gear allowed only four people to enter the county courthouse. The talks were not successful, and tempers rose over the police treatment; AIM activists caused $2 million in damages by attacking and burning the Custer Chamber of Commerce building, the courthouse, and two patrol cars. Many of the AIM demonstrators were arrested and charged; numerous people served sentences, including the mother of Wesley Bad Heart Bull.

=== 1973 Wounded Knee Incident ===
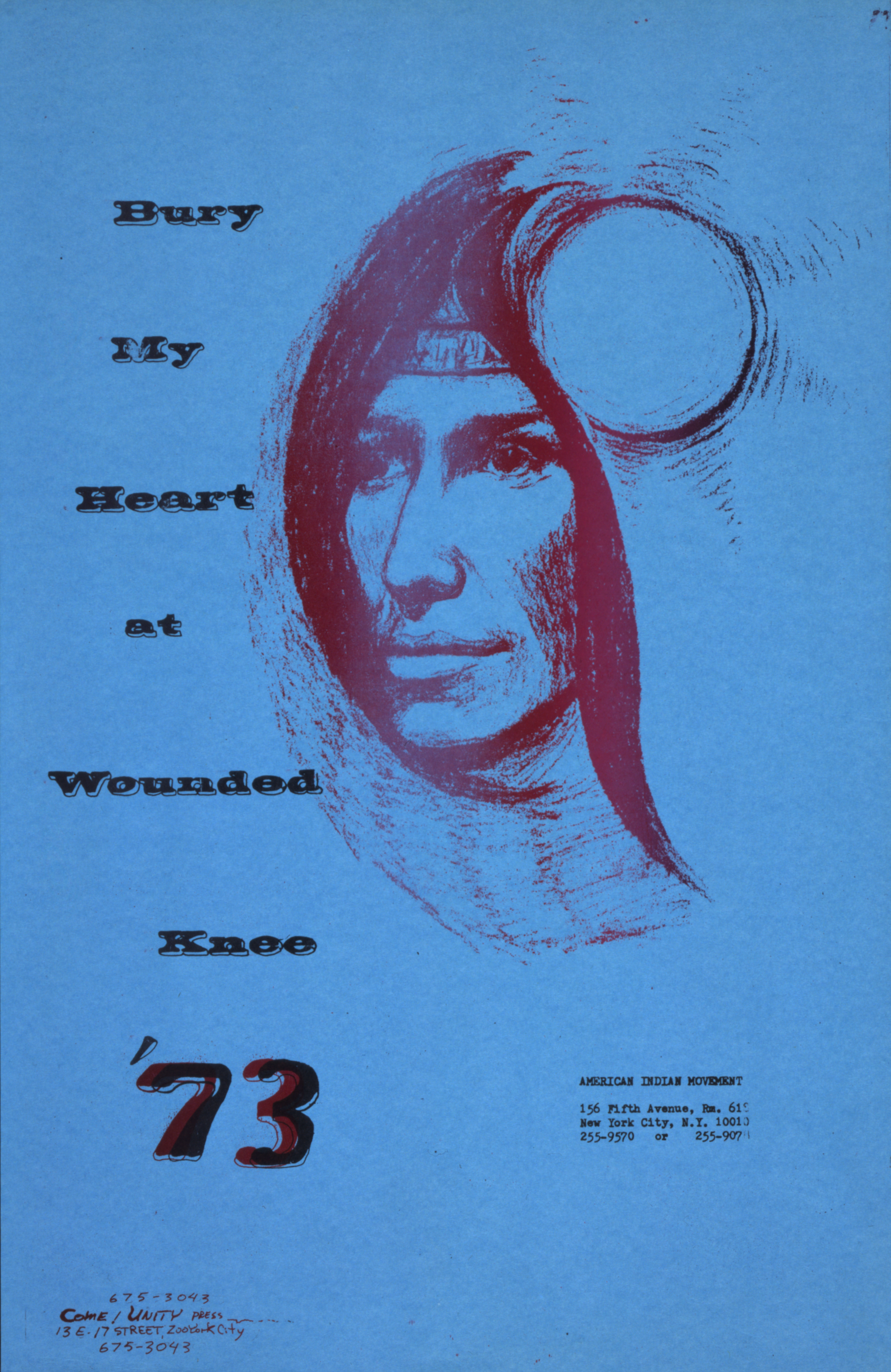
1973 poster by the American Indian movement

In addition to the problems of violence in the border towns, many traditional people at the Pine Ridge Indian Reservation were unhappy with the government of Richard Wilson, elected in 1972. When their effort to impeach him in February 1973 failed, they met to plan protests and action. Many people on the reservation were unhappy about its longstanding poverty and failures of the federal government to live up to its treaties with Indian nations. The women elders encouraged the men to act. On February 27, 1973, about 300 Oglala Lakota and AIM activists went to the hamlet of Wounded Knee for their protest. It developed into a 71-day siege, with the FBI cordoning off the area by using U.S. Marshals and later National Guard units. The occupation was symbolically held at the site of the 1890 Wounded Knee Massacre. The Oglala Lakota demanded a revival of treaty negotiations to begin to correct relations with the federal government, the respect of their sovereignty, and the removal of Wilson from office. The American Indians occupied the Sacred Heart Church, the Gildersleeve Trading Post and numerous homes of the village. Although periodic negotiations were held between AIM spokesman and U.S. government negotiators, gunfire occurred on both sides. A U.S. Marshal, Lloyd Grimm, was wounded severely and paralyzed. In April, a Cherokee from North Carolina and a Lakota AIM member were shot and killed. The elders ended the occupation then.

For about a month afterward, journalists frequently interviewed Indian spokesmen and the event received international coverage. The Department of Justice then excluded the press from access to Wounded Knee. The Academy Awards ceremony was held in Hollywood, where the actor Marlon Brando, a supporter of AIM, asked Sacheen Littlefeather to speak at the Oscars on his behalf. He had been nominated for his performance in The Godfather and won. Littlefeather arrived in full Apache regalia and read his statement that, owing to the "poor treatment of Native Americans in the film industry," Brando would not accept the award. In interviews, she also talked about the Wounded Knee occupation. The event grabbed the attention of the U.S. and the world media. The movement considered the Awards ceremony publicity, together with Wounded Knee, as a major event and public relations victory, as polls showed that Americans were sympathetic to the Indian cause.

=== Violence on the Pine Ridge Reservation ===
AIM members continued to be active on the Pine Ridge Reservation, but Wilson stayed in office and in 1974, he was re-elected in a contested election. The number of violent deaths increased during this period, an event which has been called the "Pine Ridge Reign of Terror", and as a result, more than 60 people, some of them his political opponents, died in violent incidents during the next three years. On June 26, 1975, two FBI agents, Jack Coler and Ronald Williams, were on the Pine Ridge Reservation searching for someone who was wanted for questioning which was related to an assault and a robbery which was committed against two ranch hands. The FBI agents were driving two unmarked cars, and they were also following a red pick-up truck which matched the suspect's description, driving into tribal land. The FBI agents were shot at by the occupants of the vehicle and others. The agents managed to fire five rounds before they were killed, while at least 125 bullets were fired at them. The agents were also shot at close range, with physical evidence which suggested that they had been executed. Later, reinforcements arrived, and Joe Stuntz, an AIM member who had taken part in the shootout, was fatally shot, and when he was found dead, he was wearing Coler's FBI jacket. According to the FBI, Stunz had been firing at agents when he was killed. Three AIM members were indicted for the murders: Darryl Butler, Robert Robideau and Leonard Peltier, who had escaped to Canada. An eyewitness stated that the three men joined the shooting after it had started. Butler and Robideau were both acquitted at trial, and Peltier was tried separately and controversially, he was convicted in 1976 and currently, he is serving two consecutive life sentences. The evidence which was exhibited during the trial of Butler and Robideau had been ruled inadmissible. Amnesty International has referred to his case under its Unfair Trials category.

=== Informants true and false ===
In late 1974, AIM leaders discovered that Douglas Durham, a prominent member who was by then head of security, was an FBI informant. They confronted him and expelled him from AIM at a press conference in March 1975. Durham's girlfriend, Jancita Eagle Deer, was later found dead after being struck by a speeding car. She had last been seen with Durham, and he continued to be a suspect in her possible murder. Durham was also scheduled to testify in front of the Church Committee, but that hearing was suspended due to the deadly Pine Ridge reservation shootout.

With some members in fugitive status after the Pine Ridge shootout, suspicions about FBI infiltration remained high. For various reasons, Anna Mae Aquash, the highest-ranking woman in AIM, was mistakenly suspected of being an informant, after she had voiced suspicions about Durham. Aquash was threatened by FBI agent David Price, with the threat she would be dead within the year if she refused to inform on Leonard Peltier. Aquash was arrested then quickly released shortly creating more unfounded suspicion. She disappeared in late 1975. Later it was found she had been murdered. According to testimony at trials in 2004 and 2010 of two Native rights activists convicted of her murder (Looking Cloud and Graham) kidnapped her and interrogated her in the fall of 1975. In mid-December she was taken from Denver, Colorado, to Rapid City, South Dakota, and interrogated again, then taken to Rosebud Reservation and finally to a far corner of Pine Ridge Reservation, where she was killed by a gunshot to the back of the head. Her decomposing body was found the following year, in February 1976. After the coroner failed to find the bullet hole in Aquash's head, the FBI severed both of her hands and sent them to Washington, D.C., allegedly for identification purposes, then buried her as a Jane Doe. Aquash's body was later exhumed and identified by relatives. A second autopsy discovered the bullet wound and found she had been murdered. Aquash was given a second burial, before her remains were moved to her ancestral land in Nova Scotia, Canada.

=== 1980s support of the Miskito people ===
During the Sandinista/Indian conflict in Nicaragua of the mid-1980s, Russell Means sided with Miskito opposing the Sandinista government. The Miskito charged the government with forcing relocations of as many as 8,500 Miskito. This position was controversial among other left-wing, indigenous rights groups and Central American solidarity organizations in the United States who opposed Contra activities and supported the Sandinista movement. The complex situation included Contra insurgents' recruiting among Nicaraguan Indian groups, including some Miskitos. Means recognized the difference between opposition to the Sandinista government by the Miskito, Sumo, and Rama on one hand, and the Reagan administration's support of the Contras, dedicated to the overthrow of the Sandinista regime.

=== AIM protests and contentions ===
Many AIM chapters remain committed to confronting government and corporate forces that they allege seek to marginalize Indigenous peoples. They have challenged the ideological foundations of U.S. national holidays, such as Columbus Day and Thanksgiving. In 1970 AIM declared Thanksgiving a National Day of Mourning. This protest continues under the work of the United American Indians of New England, who protest continued theft of indigenous peoples' territories and natural resources. AIM has helped educate people about the full history of the U.S., and advocates for the inclusion of Indigenous American perspectives in U.S. history. Its efforts are recognized and supported by many institutional leaders in politics, education, arts, religion, and media.

Professor Ronald L. Grimes wrote that in 1984 "the Southwest chapter of the American Indian Movement held a leadership conference that passed a resolution labeling the expropriation of Indian ceremonies (for instance, the use of sweat lodges, vision quests, and sacred pipes) a "direct attack and theft". It also condemned certain named individuals (such as Brooke Medicine Eagle, Wallace Black Elk, and Sun Bear and his tribe) and criticized specific organizations such as Vision Quest, Inc. The declaration threatened to take care of those abusing sacred ceremonies.

=== 2000s ===
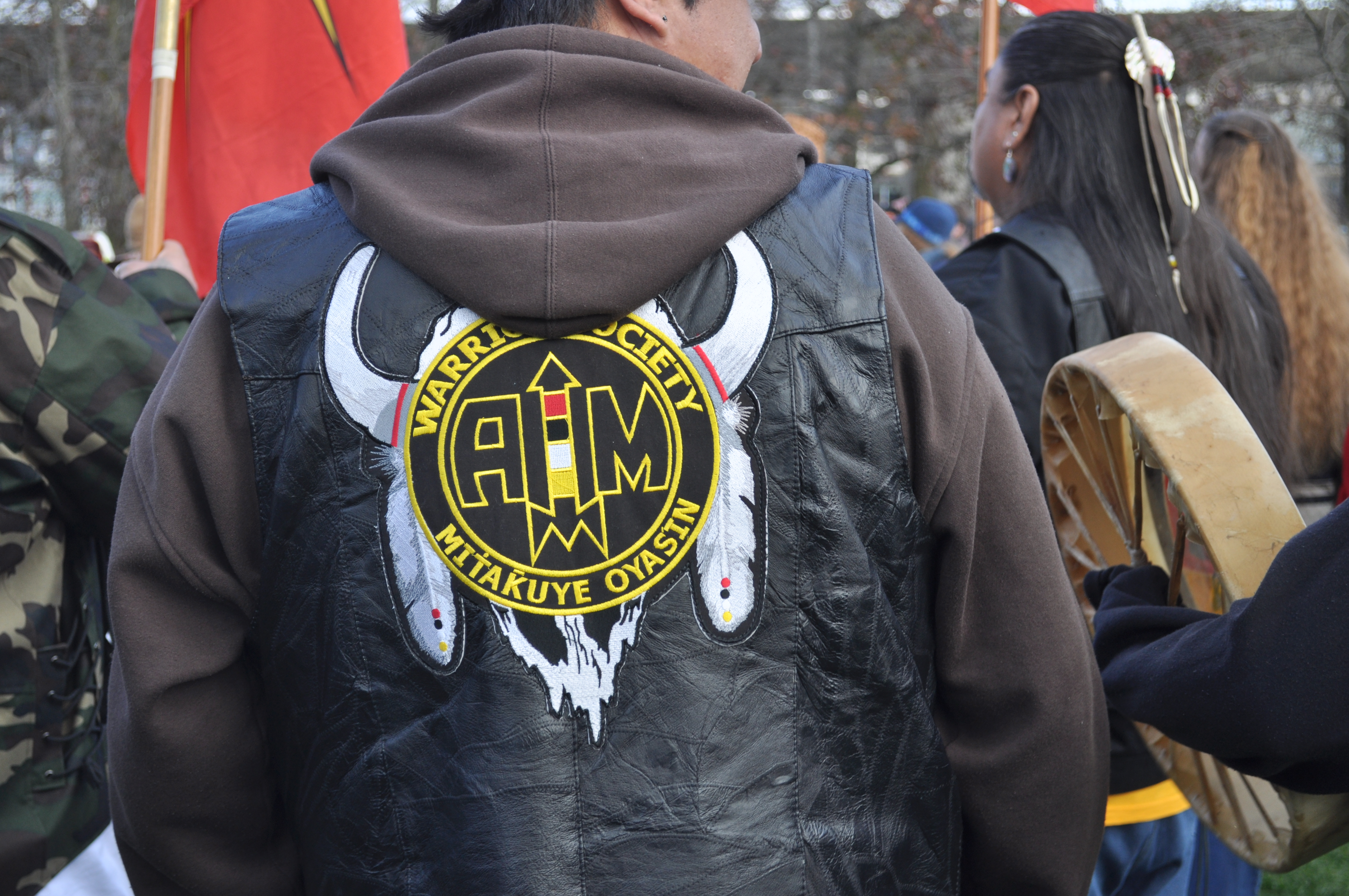
A participant at the raising of the John T. Williams Memorial Totem Pole in Seattle wears the AIM colors on their jacket, February 26, 2012

In June 2003, United States and Canadian tribes joined internationally to pass the "Declaration of War Against Exploiters of Lakota Spirituality." They felt they were being exploited by those marketing the sales of replicated Native American spiritual objects and impersonating sacred religious ceremonies as a tourist attraction. AIM delegates are working on a policy to require tribal identification for anyone claiming to represent Native Americans in any public forum or venue.

In February 2004, AIM gained more media attention by marching from Washington, D.C., to Alcatraz Island. This was one of many occasions when Indian activists used the island as the location of an event since the Occupation of Alcatraz in 1969, led by the United Indians of All Tribes, a student group from San Francisco. The 2004 march was in support of Leonard Peltier, whom many believed had not had a fair trial; he has become a symbol of spiritual and political resistance for Native Americans.

In December 2007, a delegation of Lakota Sioux, including Talon Becenti, delivered to the U.S. State Department a declaration of separation from the United States citing many broken treaties by the U.S. government in the past, and the loss of vast amounts of territory originally awarded in those treaties, the group announced its intentions to form a separate nation within the U.S. known as the Republic of Lakotah.

In March 2011, the AIM announced its support for the Gaddafi government in Libya during the First Libyan Civil War. Stating that "He [Gaddafi] has never backed down from his hatred of imperialism." and "Ghaddafi is no more a dictator than George W. Bush.", Libya and the AIM had maintained friendly relations since the 1980s, when the AIM visited Libya alongside the All-African People's Revolutionary Party in 1986, in violation of the Reagan administration's travel ban.

=== AIM timeline ===
- 1968 – Minneapolis AIM Patrol created to monitor police treatment of urban American Indians and their treatment in the justice system.
- 1969 – Indian Health Board of Minneapolis founded. This was the first American Indian, urban-based health care provider in the nation. The San Francisco-based United Indians of All Tribes and the Alcatraz-Red Power Movement occupied Alcatraz Island, a former federal prison site, for 19 months. They reclaimed federal land in the name of Native Nations. The first American Indian radio broadcasts – Radio Free Alcatraz – were heard in the Bay Area. Some AIM activists joined them.
- 1970 – Legal Rights Center created in Minneapolis to assist American Indians (as of 1994, over 19,000 clients have had legal representation thanks to AIM's work). AIM takeover of abandoned property at the naval air station near Minneapolis focuses attention on Indian education and leads to early grants for Indian education.
- 1971 – Citizen's arrest of John Old Crow. Takeover of the Bureau of Indian Affairs' headquarters in Washington, D.C., to publicize improper BIA policies. Twenty-four protesters arrested for trespassing and released. BIA Commissioner Louis Bruce shows his AIM membership card at the meeting held after the release of protesters. First National AIM Conference: 18 chapters of AIM convened to develop long-range strategy for the movement. Takeover of Winter Dam: AIM assists the Lac Court Oreilles (LCO) Ojibwe in Wisconsin in taking over a dam controlled by Northern States Power, which had flooded much of their reservation land. This action gained support by government officials and an eventual settlement with the LCO. The federal government returned more than 25,000 acres (100 km^{2}) of land to the LCO tribe for their reservation, and the Power company provided significant monies and business opportunities to the tribe.
- 1972 – Red School House, the second survival school to open, offering culturally based education services to K-12 students in Saint Paul, Minnesota. Hearth of the Earth Survival School (HOTESS), a K-12 school established to address the extremely high drop-out rate among American Indian students and lack of curricula that reflected American Indian culture. HOTESS serves as the first model of community-based, student-centered education with culturally correct curriculum operating under parental control. Trail of Broken Treaties, a pan-Indian march across country to Washington, D.C., to dramatize failures in federal policy. Protesters occupied the BIA national headquarters and did millions of dollars in damages, as well as irrevocable losses of Indian land deeds. The protesters presented a 20-point demand paper to the administration, many associated with treaty rights and renewed negotiations of treaties.
- 1973 – Legal action for school funds as in reaction to the Trail of Broken Treaties the government canceled education grants to three AIM-sponsored schools in St. Paul and Milwaukee. AIM files legal challenges, and the District Court orders the grants restored and government payment of costs and attorney fees. Wounded Knee: AIM was contacted by Oglala Lakota elders of the Pine Ridge Indian Reservation for assistance in dealing with failures in justice in border towns, the authoritarian tribal president and financial corruption within the BIA and executive committee. Together with Oglala Lakota, armed activists occupied the town of Wounded Knee for 71-days against United States armed forces.
- 1973 – On February 27, 1973, a large public meeting of 600 Indians at Calico Hall organized by Pedro Bissonette of Oglala Sioux Civil Rights Organization (OSCRO) and addressed by AIM leaders Banks and Russell Means. Demands were made for investigations into vigilante incidents and for hearings on their treaties and permission given by the tribal elders to make a stand at Wounded Knee.
- 1974 – International Indian Treaty Council, an organization representing Indian peoples throughout the western hemisphere was recognized at the United Nations in Geneva, Switzerland. Wounded Knee trials: eight months of federal trials of participants in Wounded Knee took place in Minneapolis. It was the longest Federal trial in the history of the United States. As many instances of government misconduct were revealed, the District judge Fred Nichol dismissed all charges due to government "misconduct" which "formed a pattern throughout the course of the trial" so that "the waters of justice have been polluted". Lorelei DeCora Means, Madonna Thunder Hawk, Phyllis Young, and Janet McCloud founded WARN or Women of all Red Nations, a women's movement within the AIM movement.
- 1975 – Federation of Survival Schools created to provide advocacy and networking skills to 16 survival schools throughout the United States and Canada. The Department of Housing and Urban Development (HUD) chose AIM to be the primary sponsor of the first American Indian-run housing project, Little Earth of United Tribes.
- 1977 – MIGIZI Communications founded in Minneapolis. The organization is dedicated to producing Indian news and information and educating students of all ages as tomorrow's technical work force. International Indian Treaty Council establishes non-government organization status at United Nations offices in Geneva; attends the International NGO conference and presents testimony to the United Nations. American Indian Language and Culture Legislation: AIM proposes legislative language which is passed in Minnesota, recognizing state responsibility for Indian education and culture. This legislation was recognized as a model throughout the country.
- 1978 – The first education programs for American Indian offenders: AIM establishes the first adult education program for American Indian offenders at Stillwater Prison in Minnesota. Programs later established at other state correctional facilities modeled after the Minnesota program. Circle of Life Survival School established on the White Earth Indian Reservation in Minnesota. The school receives funding for three years of operation from the Department of Education. Run for Survival: AIM youth organize and conduct 500-mile (800 km) run from Minneapolis to Lawrence, Kansas, to support The Longest Walk. The Longest Walk: Indian Nations walk across the United States from California to Washington, D.C., to protest proposed legislation calling for the abrogation of treaties with Indian nations. They set up and maintain a tipi near the White House. The proposed legislation is defeated. The Indian Child Welfare Act (ICWA) is passed in 1978 by President Jimmy Carter. This piece of legislation made it so Native American children would remain connected to their families and tribes in the case of removal from their primary residence.
- 1979 – Little Earth housing protected: an attempt by the HUD to foreclose on the Little Earth of United Tribes housing project is halted by legal action and the District Court issues an injunction against the HUD. The American Indian Opportunities Industrialization Center (AIOIC) creates job-training schools to alleviate the unemployment issues of Indian people. More than 17,000 Native Americans have been trained for jobs since AIM created the AIOIC in 1979. Anishinabe Akeeng Organization is created to regain stolen and tax-forfeited land on the White Earth Reservation in Minnesota.
- 1984 – Federation of Native Controlled Survival Schools presents legal education seminars at colleges and law schools in Minnesota, Wisconsin, California, South Dakota, Nebraska, and Oklahoma for educators of Indian students. National conference held in San Jose, California, concurrent with the National Indian Education Association Convention.
- 1986 – Schools lawsuit: Heart of the Earth and Red School House successfully sue the Department of Education Indian Education Programs for ranking the schools' programs below funding recommendation levels. The suit proved discriminatory bias in the system of ranking by the Department staff.
- 1987 – AIM Patrol: Minneapolis AIM Patrol restarts to protect American Indian women in Minneapolis after serial killings committed against them.
- 1988 – Elaine Stately Indian Youth Services (ESIYS) developed to create alternatives for youth in Minneapolis as a direct diversion to gang-involvement of Indian youth. Fort Snelling AIM annual Pow Wow: AIM establishes an annual pow-wow to recognize its 20th anniversary at Fort Snelling in Minnesota. The event becomes the largest Labor Day weekend event in any Minnesota state park.
- 1989 – Spearfishing: AIM is requested to provide expertise in dealing with protesters at boat landings. American Indian spearfishing continues despite violence, arrests and threats from whites. Senator Daniel Inouye calls for a study on the effects of Indian spearfishing. The study shows only 6% of fish taken are by Indians. Sports fishing accounts for the rest.
- 1991 – Peacemaker Center: AIM houses its AIM Patrol and ESIYS in a center in the heart of the Indian community, based on Indian spirituality. Sundance returned to Minnesota: with the support of the Dakota communities, AIM revives the Sundance at Pipestone, Minnesota. Ojibwe nations have helped make the Minnesota Sundance possible. The Pipestone Sundance becomes an annual event. In 1991, some self-appointed leaders of the Oglala Lakota, Cheyenne and other nations declare independence from the United States. The group establishes a provisional government to develop a separate national government. Elected leaders and council members of the nations do not support this action. National Coalition on Racism in Sports and Media: AIM organizes this group to address the issue of using Indian figures and names as sports team mascots. AIM leads a walk in Minneapolis to the 1992 Super Bowl. In 1994, the Minneapolis Star Tribune agrees to stop using professional sports team names that refer to Indian people unless these have been approved by the tribes.
- 1992 – The Food Connection organizes summer youth jobs program with an organic garden and spiritual camp (Common Ground) at Tonkawood Farm in Orono, Minnesota.
- 1993 – Expansion of American Indian OIC Job Training Program: the Grand Metropolitan, Inc. of Great Britain, a parent of the Pillsbury Corporation, merges its job training program with that of AIOIC and pledges future monies and support in Minnesota. Little Earth: after AIM's 18-year struggle, the HUD secretary Henry Cisneros rules that Little Earth of United Tribes housing project shall retain the right to preference for American Indian residents when considering applicants for the project. Wounded Knee anniversary: at the 20th anniversary of the Wounded Knee Incident at Pine Ridge Reservation, the elected Oglala Sioux Tribe president John Yellow Bird Steele thanked AIM for its 1973 actions.

Due to continuing dissension, AIM splits. AIM Grand Governing Council (AIMGGC) is based in Minneapolis and still led by founders while AIM-International Confederation of Autonomous Chapters is based in Denver, Colorado.

- 1996 – April 3–8, 1996: as a representative of the AIM Grand Governing Council and special representative of the International Indian Treaty Council, Vernon Bellecourt, along with William A. Means, president of IITC, attends the preparatory meeting for the Intercontinental Encounter for Humanity and Against Neo-Liberalism (IEHN), hosted by the Zapatista Army of National Liberation (EZLN), held in LaRealidad, Eastern Chiapas, Mexico between July 27 and August 3, 1996. The second meeting for the IEHN in 1997 is hosted by the EZLN and attended by delegates of the IITC and AIM.
- 1998 – February 12, 1998: AIM is charged with Security at the Ward Valley Occupation in Southern California. The occupation lasts for 113 days and results in a victory for the Colorado River Indian Tribes (CRIT) against the plan to use the area for the disposal of nuclear wastes. February 27, 1998: on the 25th anniversary of Wounded Knee, an Oglala Lakota Nation resolution establishes February 27 as a National Day of Liberation. July 16–19, 1998: the 25th annual Lac Courte Oreilles Honor the Earth Homecoming Celebration to honor the people who participated in the July 31, 1971, takeover of the Winter Dam and the beginning of the Honor the Earth observance. August 2–11, 1998: 30th Anniversary of the AIM Grand Governing Council and Sacred Pipestone Quarries in Pipestone, Minnesota. Conference commemorating AIM's 30th anniversary.
- 1999 – February 1999: three United States activists working with a group of UÕwa Indians in Colombia are kidnapped by rebels. Ingrid Washinawatok, 41 (Menominee), a humanitarian; Terence Freitas, 24, an environmental scientist from Santa Cruz, California; and LaheÕenaÕe Gay, 39 of Hawaii, are seized near the village of Royota, in Arauca province in northeastern Colombia on February 25 while preparing to leave after a two-week on-site visit. On March 5, their bullet-riddled bodies are discovered across the border in Venezuela.
- 2000 – July 2000: AIM 32nd anniversary Conference on the Lac Courte Oreilles Ojibwe Nation Reservation in northern Wisconsin. October 2000 – AIM founded commission to seek justice for Ingrid Washinawatok and companions.
- 2001 – March 2001: Reps of the AIM GGC attend the EZLN March for Peace, Justice and Dignity, Zocolo Plaza in Mexico City. July 2001 – 11th annual Youth & Elders International Cultural Gathering and Sundance in Pipestone, Minnesota. August 2001: five anti-wahoo demonstrators with AIM bring civil lawsuit for false arrest against the city of Cleveland, Ohio. November 2001 – The American Indian Forum on Racism in Sports and Media is held at Black Bear Crossing in St. Paul, Minnesota.
- 2002 – August 2002: 12th annual International Youth & Elders Cultural Gathering and Sundance in Pipestone, Minnesota.
- 2003 – May 2003: Quarterly Meeting of the AIM National Board of Directors Thunderbird House in Winnipeg, Manitoba. August 2003 – 13th Annual International Youth & Elders Cultural Gathering and Sundance, Pipestone, Minnesota.
- 2004 – August 2004: 14th annual International Youth & Elders Cultural Gathering and Sundance in Pipestone, Minnesota.
- 2005 – May 2005: 1st annual Clyde H. Bellecourt Endowment Scholarship Fund and Awards Banquet in Minneapolis. July 2005 – 15th annual International Youth & Elders Cultural Gathering and Sundance, Pipestone, Minnesota.
- 2006 – May 2006: 2nd annual Clyde H. Bellecourt Endowment Scholarship Fund and Awards Banquet in Minneapolis. July 2006 – 16th annual International Youth & Elders Cultural Gathering and Sundance, Pipestone, Minnesota.

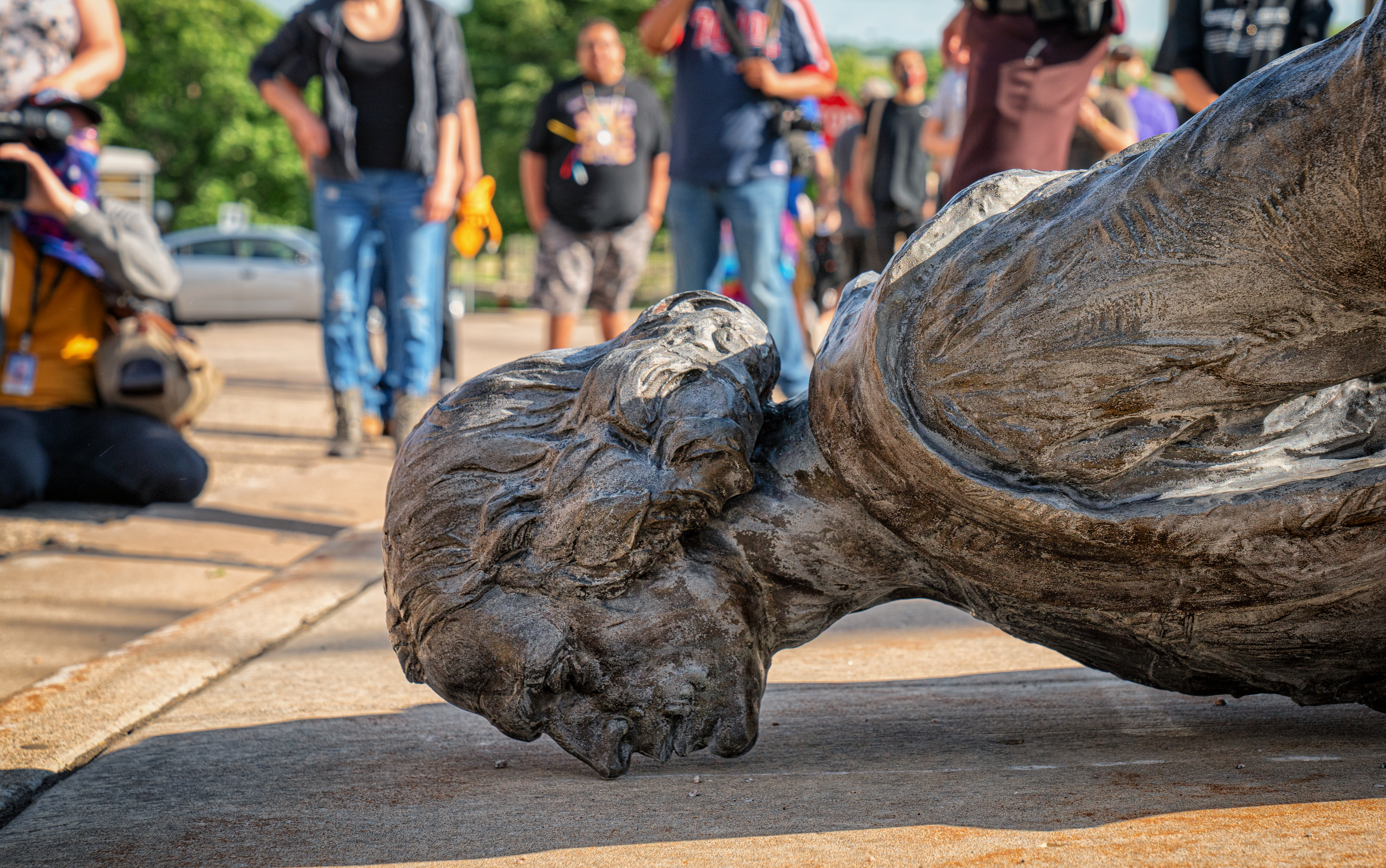
Members of AIM tore down the statue of Christopher Columbus outside the Minnesota State Capitol in June 2020 during the George Floyd protests

=== Other Native American organizations ===
The American Indian Movement founded several organizations since its establishment in 1968. Its focus on cultural renewal and employment has led to the creation of housing programs, the American Indian Opportunities and Industrialization Center (for job training), and AIM Street Medics, as well as a legal-aid center. The American Opportunities and Industrialization Center, founded in 1979 in Minneapolis, Minnesota, has built a workforce of over 20,000 people from the entire Twin City area and tribal nations across the country and is a nationally recognized leader in the workforce development field. Following the AIM's all-inclusive practice, AIOIC resources are available to all regardless of race, creed, age, gender, or sexual orientation. The Tokama Institute, a division of the AIOIC, is focused on helping American Indians acquire the foundational skills and knowledge in order to obtain a successful career. Aside from post-secondary institutions, AIM has helped develop and establish its own K-12 schools including Heart of the Earth Survival School and the Little Red Schoolhouse both located in Minneapolis. Further, AIM has led to the establishment of Women of All Red Nations (WARN). Established in 1974, WARN has put women at the forefront of the organization and focused its energies in combating sexism, government sterilization policies, and other injustices. Other Native American organizations include NATIVE (Native American Traditions, Ideals, Values Educational Society), LISN (League of Indigenous Sovereign Nations), EZLN (Zapatista Army of National Liberation), and the IPC (Indigenous Peoples Caucus). Although each group may have its own specific goals or focus, they are all fighting for the same principles of respect and equality for Native Americans. The Northwest Territories Indian Brotherhood, the Committee of Original People's Entitlement were two organization that spearheaded the native rights movement in northern Canada during the 1960s.

== International Indian Treaty Council ==
AIM established the International Indian Treaty Council (IITC) in June 1974. It invited representatives from numerous indigenous nations, and delegates from 98 international groups attended the meeting. The sacred pipe serves as a symbol of the Nations "common bonds of spirituality, ties to the land and respect for traditional cultures". The IITC focuses on issues such as treaty and land rights, rights and protection of indigenous children, protection of sacred sites, and religious freedom.

The International Indian Treaty Council (IITC) uses networking, technical assistance, and coalition building. In 1977, the IITC became a Non-Governmental Organization with Consultative Status to the United Nations Economic and Social Council. The organization concentrates on involving Indigenous Peoples in U.N. forums. In addition, the IITC strives to bring awareness about the issues concerning Indigenous Peoples to non-Indigenous organizations.

=== United Nations adoption of indigenous peoples' rights ===
On September 13, 2007, the United Nations General Assembly adopted the "Declaration on the Rights of Indigenous Peoples". A total of 144 states or countries voted in favor. Four voted against it while 11 abstained. The four voting against it were the United States, Canada, Australia, and New Zealand, whose representatives said they believed the declaration "goes too far".

The Declaration announces rights of indigenous peoples, such as rights to self-determination, traditional lands and territories, traditional languages and customs, natural resources and sacred sites.

== Ideological differences within AIM ==
In 1993, AIM split into two factions, each claiming to be the authentic inheritor of the AIM tradition. The AIM-Grand Governing Council is based in Minneapolis, Minnesota, and was associated with the leadership of Clyde Bellecourt (who died in 2022) and his brother Vernon Bellecourt (who died in 2007). The GGC tends toward a more centralized, controlled political philosophy.

The AIM-International Confederation of Autonomous Chapters, based in Denver, Colorado, was founded by thirteen AIM chapters in 1993 at a meeting in Denver, Colorado. The group issued its Edgewood Declaration, citing organizational grievances and complaining of authoritarian leadership by the Bellecourts. Ideological differences were growing, with the AIM-International Confederation of Autonomous Chapters taking a spiritual, perhaps more mainstream, approach to activism. The autonomous chapters group argues that AIM has always been organized as a series of decentralized, autonomous chapters, with local leadership accountable to local constituencies. The autonomous chapters reject the assertions of central control by the Minneapolis group as contrary both to indigenous political traditions and to the original philosophy of AIM.

=== Accusations of murder ===
At a press conference in Denver, Colorado, on 3 November 1999, Russell Means accused Vernon Bellecourt of having ordered the execution of Anna Mae Aquash in 1975. The "highest-ranking" woman in AIM at the time, she had been shot execution style in mid-December 1975 and left in a far corner of the Pine Ridge Indian Reservation after having been kidnapped from Denver, Colorado, and interrogated in Rapid City, South Dakota, as a possible FBI informant. Means implicated Clyde Bellecourt in her murder as well, and other AIM activists, including Theresa Rios. Means said that part of the dissension within AIM in the early 1990s had related to actions to expel the Bellecourt brothers for their part in the Aquash execution; the organization split apart.

Earlier that day in a telephone interview with the journalists Paul DeMain and Harlan McKosato about the upcoming press conference, Minnie Two Shoes had said, speaking of the importance of Aquash:

Part of why she was so important is because she was very symbolic, she was a hard working woman, she dedicated her life to the movement, to righting all the injustices that she could, and to pick somebody out and launch their little cointelpro program on her to bad jacket her to the point where she ends up dead, whoever did it, let's look at what the reasons are, you know, she was killed and lets look at the real reasons why it could have been any of us, it could have been me, it could have been, ya gotta look at the basically thousands of women, you gotta remember that it was mostly women in AIM, it could have been any one of us and I think that's why it's been so important and she was just such a good person.

McKosato said that "her [Aquash's] death has divided the American Indian Movement". On 4 November 1999, in a follow-up show on Native American Calling the next day, Vernon Bellecourt denied any involvement by him and his brother in the death of Aquash.

At Federal grand jury hearings in 2003, the Indian men Arlo Looking Cloud and John Graham were indicted for shooting Aquash in December 1975. In February '04, Arlo Looking Cloud was convicted of murder in Rapid City. He named as the gunman John Graham, who was in the Yukon. After extradition, John Graham was convicted, in 2010 in Rapid City, of the murder. In both trials, hearsay testimony about the motive for the murder included statements that Aquash heard Leonard Peltier say he killed the FBI agents at Oglala in June 1975, and fear that Aquash could be working with the FBI. Peltier was convicted in 1976 of murder for the Oglala killings, on other evidence.

== See also ==
- Asian American activism
- Black Lives Matter
- Black nationalism
- Black Panther Party
- Black power movement
- Black separatism
- Brown Berets
- Civil rights movement
- Civil rights movements, worldwide
- Contemporary Native American issues in the United States
- History of civil rights in the United States
- Human rights in the United States
- Native American civil rights
- Native American genocide in the United States – the notion that Native Americans have been subjected to genocide throughout their history because of racism against them, an aspect of racism in the United States
- Red Power movement
- Republic of Lakotah proposal
- Republic of New Afrika
- Secession in the United States
- Young Lords Party
- Zapatista Army of National Liberation

== Bibliography ==
- Voigt, Matthias André (2024). Reinventing the Warrior: Masculinity in the American Indian Movement, 1968-1973. Lawrence: University of Kansas Press. ISBN 9780700636976. OCLC 1453864226.
- Matthias André Voigt (2023). "Warrior Women – Indigenous Women, Gender Relations, and Sexual Politics Within the American Indian Movement and at Wounded Knee.” American Indian Culture and Research Journal (2023) vol. 46, no. 3, 101–130. DOI https://doi.org/10.17953/A3.1910.
- Matthias André Voigt (2021). “Warriors for a Nation – The American Indian Movement, Indigenous Men, and Nation-building at the Takeover of Wounded Knee in 1973.” American Indian Culture and Research Journal (2021) vol. 45 no. 2, 1-38. DOI https://doi.org/10.17953/aicrj.45.2.voigt
- Matthias André Voigt (2021). "Between Powerlessness and Protest: Indigenous Men and Masculinities in the Twin Cities of Minneapolis/St.Paul and the Emergence of the American Indian Movement," Settler Colonial Studies vol. 11, no. 2, 221–241. https://doi.org/10.1080/2201473X.2021.1881330.
- Banks, Dennis; Erdoes, Richard (2004). Ojibwa Warrior: Dennis Banks and the Rise of the American Indian Movement. University of Oklahoma Press. ISBN 978-0806135809. OCLC 53059503.
- Deloria, Vine Jr. (1988). Custer Died for Your Sins : an Indian manifesto. Norman: University of Oklahoma Press. ISBN 978-0806121291. OCLC 17234301.
- Langworthy, Lucas (Director) (2010). Taking AIM: The Story of the American Indian Movement (DVD).
- Johansen, Bruce E. (2015). "Encyclopedia of the American Indian Movement". Encyclopedia of the American Indian Movement. Greenwood. ISBN 978-1785394645 – via Credo Reference.
- Johnson, Troy R. (2007). Red Power: The Native American Civil Rights Movement. New York: Chelsea House. ISBN 978-0791093412. OCLC 77520605.
- Matthiessen, Peter (1992). In the Spirit of Crazy Horse. New York: Penguin Books. ISBN 978-0140144567. OCLC 25313752.
- Means, Russell (1995). Where White Men Fear to Tread: The Autobiography of Russell Means. Wolf, Marvin J. (1st ed.). New York: St. Martin's Press. ISBN 978-0312136215. OCLC 32780115.
- Nagel, Joane (1996). American Indian Ethnic Renewal: Red Power and the Resurgence of Identity and Culture. New York: Oxford University Press. ISBN 978-0195080537. OCLC 31610380.
- Peltier, Leonard (1999). Prison Writings: My Life is My Sun Dance. Arden, Harvey. (1st ed.). New York: St. Martin's Press. ISBN 978-0312203542. OCLC 40862180.
- Redford, Robert (2004). Incident at Oglala: The Leonard Peltier Story (DVD). Lions Gate.
- Stern, Kenneth S (2002). Loud Hawk: the United States versus the American Indian Movement. Norman, OK: University of Oklahoma Press. ISBN 978-0806134390. OCLC 876192514.
- Weyler, Rex (1982). Blood of the Land. The Government and Corporate War Against the American Indian Movement. Random House. ISBN 978-0394717326.
- Bancroft, Dick; Wittstock, Laura Waterman (2013). We Are Still Here: A Photographic History of the American Indian Movement. St. Paul, Minn: Minnesota Historical Society Press. ISBN 978-0873518871. OCLC 930953303.
