= Trail of Broken Treaties =

1972 American Indian and First Nations caravan

- Trail of Broken Treaties Caravan; Part of American Indian Movement(AIM)
- Date: October–November 1972
- Location: Bureau of Indian Affairs building Washington DC
- Goals: Native American sovereignty
- Methods: Occupation protest

Parties
Indigenous people from the United States and Canada	US federal government

The Trail of Broken Treaties (also known as the Trail of Broken Treaties Caravan and the Pan American Native Quest for Justice) was a 1972 cross-country caravan of American Indian and First Nations organizations that started on the West Coast of the United States and ended at the Department of Interior headquarters building at the US capital of Washington, D.C. Participants called for the restoration of tribes’ treaty-making authority, the abolition of the Bureau of Indian Affairs, and federal investment in jobs, housing, and education.

The protest inspired sizable gatherings of Native Americans throughout the journey, with the caravan described as "over four miles long and included some 700 activists from more than 200 tribes and 25 states" when it left Saint Paul, Minnesota, for Washington, D.C..

The eight organizations that sponsored the caravan included the American Indian Movement (AIM), the Canadian National Indian Brotherhood (later renamed the Assembly of First Nations), the Native American Rights Fund, the National Indian Youth Council, the National American Indian Council, the National Council on Indian Work, National Indian Leadership Training, and the American Indian Committee on Alcohol and Drug Abuse. In Minneapolis, AIM headquarters, activists developed a Twenty-Point Position paper to define their demands.

== History ==
The 1960s were a period of increasing activism by American Indians (and First Nations in Canada) as they worked to renew civil rights and improve relations with federal governments that had repeatedly failed to satisfy treaty obligations. By this time numerous American Indians were living in urban settings, encouraged to relocate from reservations by the federal government in an effort to find more work opportunities, but often isolated by discrimination, poor educations in public schools, police harassment, and limited work. The lengthy occupation of Alcatraz by student activists from San Francisco and the founding of the American Indian Movement (AIM) in 1968 in Minneapolis, Minnesota, by mostly Ojibwe activists were examples of rising activism.

To raise national awareness of issues related to Indian-federal relations, AIM and other organizations conceived a cross-country caravan to promote their cause. Protesters joined portions of the caravan in West Coast cities: Seattle, San Francisco, and Los Angeles, which they departed on October 6, by bus and auto. The three caravans merged in Minneapolis, Minnesota where leaders drafted a Twenty-Point proposal of demands. The caravan reached Washington, D.C. in early November, the week before the presidential election (in which incumbent President Nixon was re-elected). The protesters had chosen this time period as best to present the next administration with "an agenda for action on Indian problems." The large gathering of Native Americans in the US capital made national news as they advocated for their rights and sought to meet with government officials to negotiate a new relationship.

As the eastward-bound caravan continued to swell in size, directives were issued to officials at the Bureau of Indian Affairs (BIA), instructing them not to provide assistance to these groups. Attempts were made to characterize the movement as an urban militant faction, detached from the beliefs held by those residing on reservations. The caravans found widespread support as they made stops at reservations across the country, with numerous well-educated members and respected elders from these communities actively joining the movement. Reports indicate escalating conflicts between the National Tribal Chairmen's Association (NTCA) and the National Congress of American Indians (NCAI), with those possessing Native tribal leaders on their boards facing internal challenges and striving to salvage their standing.

The extensive gathering of Native Americans in the U.S. capital garnered national attention as they fervently advocated for their rights, aiming to initiate discussions with government officials to establish a new relationship. The caravan arrived in Washington, D.C., on November 3, 1972. Housing arrangements fell under, forcing the protestors to spend their first night in a rat-infested church basement. Despite negotiations, attempts to secure auditorium space and the use of the Bureau of Indian Affairs (BIA) kitchen were denied. Amidst ongoing discussions, General Services Administration guards prompted the protesters to leave, escalating tensions as police in riot gear arrived and forcibly breached windows. The building was surrounded, and snipers positioned on the nearby Interior Department building. Undeterred, protesters maintained their positions, marking the beginning of the "occupation" of the BIA. A banner proclaiming "Native American Embassy" adorned the building's facade, with a teepee erected on the front lawn, designating the property as "liberated territory,".

During their occupation, protesters spent days scrutinizing and retrieving files that brought to light concerns about unjust dealings regarding land, water, fishing, and mineral rights. Simultaneously, some individuals seized artifacts, pottery, and artwork, contending that these items rightfully belonged to various tribes. The standoff concluded a week later when the protesters consented to engaging in serious negotiations regarding their Twenty-Point thesis, signifying the end of the occupation. Subsequently, the caravan received $65,500, intended for travel and food expenses, to be divided among all participants. Notably, this funding was allocated from the Office of Economic Opportunity (OEO), with money that was originally designated for other Native American initiatives. While amnesty was granted to all protesters, it did not extend to cover damages incurred at the federal government building during the occupation. The federal government finally appointed a negotiator and agreed to appoint a Native American to a post within the BIA.

== Response from government officials ==
As the caravan dispersed, government officials maintained a resistant posture. The Nixon Administration, having refused to meet the protesters during the occupation, continued to distance themselves from the demands outlined in the Twenty-Point Position paper. Despite the momentum generated by the caravan and the subsequent negotiations, there was limited acknowledgment or tangible action taken by the government to address the issues raised by the activists.

The aftermath of the Trail of Broken Treaties revealed ongoing tensions between federally affiliated indigenous organizations. The accusations of corruption and internal conflicts within groups like the National Tribal Chairmen's Association (NTCA) and the National Congress of American Indians (NCAI) persisted, reflecting a broader struggle for representation and influence within the Native American community.

While the government appointed a negotiator and agreed to appoint a Native American to a post within the BIA as part of the resolution, the broader systemic issues and demands outlined by the activists received limited attention. The federal response after the caravan dissolution showcased the complexities and challenges inherent in advocating for Native American rights and policy reform during this pivotal period of activism. The Trail of Broken Treaties, though impactful, highlighted the ongoing struggle for meaningful change and justice for Native American communities.

== Outcomes ==
The Nixon Administration offered a lukewarm response to the Twenty-Point Paper. While a significant portion of the demands centered on reinstating the practice of making treaties on a tribal or regional basis to delineate the specific rights of Indian tribes, the administration asserted its inability to overturn the legislation from the 1924 Indian Citizenship Act. Citing this legal framework, the administration contended that the U.S. government cannot engage in treaty-making with its own citizens.

While the demonstration was widely covered by national media, including increasingly important television reporting, the media largely focused on issues related to the federal government, rather than what the protesters identified as failures of the government and their stressing tribal sovereignty as the basis for seeking new relations and negotiations. Having captured media attention, AIM organized additional demonstrations to advocate for Native American justice, such as the Wounded Knee Occupation protest beginning in February 1973.

The Trail of Broken Treaties Caravan, a seminal moment in Native American activism during the early 1970s, left an enduring impact that rippled through subsequent decades. This cross-country journey and the subsequent occupation of the Bureau of Indian Affairs (BIA) building elevated the visibility of Native American challenges, spotlighting broken treaties and socio-economic struggles. The unity displayed during the caravan empowered indigenous communities, fostering a collective strength that fueled future collaborative efforts. The legacy of the Trail of Broken Treaties lives on in the continued advocacy efforts within Native American communities, inspiring subsequent generations to engage in social and political movements. This historic event remains a testament to the resilience and determination of indigenous communities in their ongoing pursuit of justice, sovereignty, and cultural preservation.

== Summary of the Twenty Point Position Paper ==
The Twenty-Point Position Paper was drafted by rights activist Hank Adams a participant in the Trail of Broken Treaties. The paper was intended to assert the sovereignty of the Indian Nations and to re-open treaty negotiations:

1. The United States Federal Government should retract the component of the 1871 Indian Appropriations Act which eliminated the power of the Indian Nations to contract constitutionally bound treaties with the U.S. government.
2. The United States Federal Government should establish a Treaty Commission that will have the power to contract new treaties to ensure the future of the Indian Nations. In addition, it should be established that no terms of existing treaties can be violated.
3. The Federal Government should pledge that they will meet with four American Indian representatives before June 2, 1974, in order to discuss the future of the Indian Nations. The national media should be present for this meeting.
4. The President of the United States should establish a committee consisting of both Indians and non-Indians to examine treaty commitments and violations.
5. Treaties that have not been ratified should be presented to the Senate.
6. All American Indian peoples should be considered to be in treaty relations with the United States Federal Government.
7. The United States Federal Government should ensure that there is judicial enforcement and protection of the treaty rights of American Indians.
8. The United States Federal Government should provide a new system of federal court jurisdiction through which American Indians can address treaty or tribal rights. This system of jurisdiction must apply both in cases between American Indians and between American Indians and non-Indians. It is of utmost importance that leaders of the Indian Nations take part in the process of interpreting treaties.
9. The Congress of the United States should relinquish their control over Indian Affairs and instead create a joint committee. This committee is to be called the "Committee on Reconstruction of Indian Relations and Programs". The members of the committee must be willing to commit significant amounts of their time to restructure Indian relations in America.
10. By July 4, 1976, the United States Federal Government should restore a permanent Native American land area of no less than 110 million acres (450,000 km^{2}). This area should be perpetually non-taxable by the federal government. In addition, the Termination Acts of the 1950s and 1960s should be immediately repealed.
11. There should be a revision of 25 U.S.C. 163. This revision will call for all Indian rights to be restored to individuals that have lost them due to issues with enrollment. In addition, American Indians must be able to qualify for membership in more than one tribe and not be prohibited from receiving dual benefits.
12. Congress must repeal state laws passed under the Public Law 280. PL280 allows for people not belonging to the Indian community to gain control over governing in reservation areas. The law takes away American Indians' ability to govern themselves without external conflict.
13. All violent offenses against Indians should be treated as federal crimes and the persons committing the crimes must face penalties under federal prosecution. Congress should also create a national federal Indian grand jury. This grand jury should consist only of Indians that are chosen by the President as well as by Indian people. In addition, this jury will have jurisdiction over non-Indian peoples living on Indian reservations.
14. The Bureau of Indian Affairs should be dismantled by 1976 and a new government structure that maintains Indian-Federal relations should be established.
15. The new structure that will replace the Bureau of Indian Affairs will be called the "Office of Federal Indian Relations and Community Reconstruction".
16. The "Office of Federal Indian Relations and Community Reconstruction" will promote equality between the Indian Nations and the federal government and seek to remedy the wrongdoings of the federal government against the American Indians.
17. Congress should enact a statute that allows for trade, commerce, and transportation of Indians to remain outside the jurisdiction of the federal government. American Indians within reservation areas should have immunity from federal and state taxation.
18. The United States government should recognize and protect the spiritual and cultural integrity of the Indian Nations.
19. Forms of Indian organization should be consolidated so as to regain the unification of the Indian Nations.
20. The United States Federal Government should focus on the improvement and creation of better housing, education, employment and economic development for the American Indians.

== Representation in other media ==
- The documentary film Trudell, directed by Heather Rae, includes activist John Trudell discussing his part in the Trail Caravan, as well as the social context of the full action.
- The 2025 documentary film Free Leonard Peltier, made by Jesse Short Bull and David France, mentions Leonard Peltier's role with the march.
