= Sandra Perron =

Canadian Army officer

- Born: 29 December 1965 (age 60); Portage la Prairie, Manitoba, Canada
- Military career
- Allegiance: Canada
- Branch: Infantry
- Rank: Major

Major Sandra Marie Perron (born 29 December 1965) is a former Canadian Army officer. She was the first female infantry officer in the Canadian Army. Perron served in the infantry from 1991 to 1996, completing two tours of duty in Yugoslavia. While in the Army she was subjected to sexual harassment and "excessively rough" training.

== Early life ==
Perron was born on 29 December 1965 in Portage la Prairie. She was a military brat and moved around Canada as a child. She served in the Royal Canadian Army Cadets (RCAC) from 1979 to 1984, rising to the rank of cadet lieutenant and gaining the gold level of The Duke of Edinburgh's Award.

== Military service ==
Perron joined the Canadian Armed Forces immediately after leaving the RCAC and was enrolled in the regular officer training plan, receiving basic training at CFB Chilliwack and attending the University of Winnipeg. While taking a summer course at CFB Borden, Perron was raped and had an abortion. She did not report the event and graduated in 1988 with a Bachelor of Economics. Perron then began service in the 5th Service Battalion at CFB Valcartier. In 1989, while at Valcartier, she was promoted to captain.

Perron transferred to the infantry after it was opened to women in 1989. Her training began in 1991 at CFB Gagetown. She reported being harassed as a student and subjected to "excessively rough" training. Other officers supposedly "saw her as a threat" and recent graduates of the Royal Military College particularly disliked her. On 29 April 1992 Perron was taken 'prisoner' in a simulation of a military exercise. She was mock interrogated, beaten, tied to a tree, and left in the snow for two hours without boots as part of a training exercise. On 15 May she was again taken prisoner in a mock exercise and hit in the stomach, along with other soldiers. As an officer, Perron was considered very talented, serving in the Royal 22nd Regiment beginning in 1992. She was deployed with the regiment to Yugoslavia, serving as assistant operations officer. On a second tour, she commanded a TOW Under Armour platoon in 1995 in Croatia, for which she earned an exceptional service commendation.

Perron left the Regular Army in 1996, because she was not accepted by other soldiers and was progressing very slowly, having been given a job she considered "very junior". While Perron herself did not complain about her treatment while in the army, pictures of her tied to the tree were leaked on 30 December 1996 on the front page of Le Journal de Montréal and an investigation of her treatment began. The soldiers involved included Michel Rainville, who argued the treatment was "normal". Others contended her case constituted a violation of the Geneva code or constituted abuse. A report issued in January 1997 concluded that she experienced "subtle and overt" sexual harassment while in the army. Perron said that she was subject to "constant emotional and psychological harassment". Her experience is credited with forcing the army to revise its procedures in an attempt to stop sexual harassment. She rejoined the Cadet Instructor Cadre in 1996.

== Later career ==
From 1996 to 2003 Perron was in the Cadet Instructors Cadre, a component of the Canadian Armed Forces and was promoted to Major. On 16 November 1998, she was made the head of a nine-member advisory board to the Minister of National Defence on helping women and minorities 'blend' into the Canadian Armed Forces. The board produced a report concluding that "ignorance and intolerance plague Canada's Armed Forces" and described "the military's efforts to integrate women and visible minorities as a failure". After leaving the Army, she became a manager for General Motors in Quebec, and also worked for Bombardier Aerospace. She works at a consulting firm in Edmonton, being made senior partner in 2013. Perron published Outstanding in the Field: A Memoir by Canada’s First Female Infantry Officer in 2013. The Globe and Mail called her memoir "revealing and moving", it won the nonfiction Quebec Writers' Federation Award and was shortlisted for the Shaughnessy Cohen Prize for Political Writing. In 2020 Perron made care packages for the Canadian Armed Forces during the COVID-19 pandemic.

In 2024, filmmaker Mélanie Charbonneau entered production on Out Standing, a film adaptation of Perron's memoir written by Charbonneau and Martine Pagé. The film premiered in the Discovery program at the 2025 Toronto International Film Festival.
