= Ricardo Gouveia =

Ricardo Gouveia may refer to:

- Rigo 23 (Ricardo Gouveia, born 1966), Portuguese muralist, painter, and political artist
- Ricardo Gouveia (golfer) (born 1991), Portuguese golfer
