= Robert Land Academy =

Coordinates: 42.99668°N 79.56428°W

Location
- 6726 & 6727 South Chippawa Road; Wellandport, Ontario, L0R 2J0; Canada

Information
- School type: Private boarding school Boys-only; Military school
- Motto: Deus et Patria (Latin) (God and Country)
- Established: 1978
- Founder: G. Scott Bowman
- Closed: June 2025
- Oversight: Board of Governors
- Headmaster: Peter Stock
- Faculty: 55
- Grades: 5–12
- Enrolment: 75–105 (different in every semester)
- Average class size: 15 students
- Campus: 168 acres
- Nickname: Loyalists
- Tuition: Can$68,000
- Website: robertlandacademy.com

Robert Land Academy (RLA) was a private military-style boarding school program in West Lincoln, Ontario, Canada. The school was not affiliated with the Canadian Armed Forces. As of June 27, 2025, the academy filed an assignment in bankruptcy amid a multitude of lawsuits alleging systematic physical and sexual abuse, with Deloitte Restructuring Inc. appointed as trustee.

The academy, which began accepting students in 1978, was an all-boys institution. On average, a total of 160 students between Grade 5 (last year of elementary school) and Grade 12 (last year of high school) were enrolled at the Academy during any one school year. All students enrolled at the academy were put through military-style institutionalization on campus throughout the school year.

On April 9, 2025, The Walrus reported on the announced closure of RLA. RLA officially announced that the school would be closing in June 2025.

== History ==
The school was founded in 1978 by G. Scott Bowman, who for many years, lied about having served as a Canadian Forces veteran, paratrooper and International Covert Action Troubleshooter. A November 2, 1996, article in The Hamilton Spectator found Bowman's claims to be false. Bowman was also found to have lied about his education.

The school is named after Robert Land, a frontiersman and veteran of the French and Indian War.

According to the Academy's website, the military theme allows for the reinforcement of the importance of organization, teamwork, discipline and personal responsibility. The Academy claimed that 100 per cent of its graduating class who apply to university or college are accepted each year.

== Abuse of students and closure ==
A September 26, 1987, article about Robert Land Academy in the Hamilton Spectator included a photograph of a young boy with his mouth taped shut. Below the photograph it stated, "Recruit ******* is disciplined for talking in class."

In February 1995, a student at Robert Land Academy gave a speech to the staff and student body about the subject of "tolerance to homosexuality". The speech was met with enthusiasm and applause by students and staff and was judged with an average score of 91 per cent, winning the competition. Shortly after, the student was told by the headmaster that he would not be going forward in the competition and he could not perform the speech because "it contravened the values of Robert Land Academy" and was "too risky". This led to the English teacher resigning and several news stories followed.

The Hamilton Spectator obtained an undated "Parent's Handbook" which was discussed in a March 1998 article. It reads, "Contact with family is restricted. Parents get one five-minute phone call per week, and students are accompanied at all times by another cadet." "Parents may call at any time to ask about their son's progress, but they will not be put through." "Letters from home are encouraged, but ask not to be 'syrupy' or 'overly tender'." The handbook also warns, "Letters from cadets may tell you that he's on his way home, hasn't eaten in a week, is beaten daily and hates you for sending him there ... but do not be overly worried by it".

Robert Land Academy hired a non-classroom instructor who had a criminal conviction for 'negligence performing a military duty' related to a 16-year-old Somali teen's death, according to an October 2025 CBC article. Identified in the article as Mark Adam Boland, the school brought him on just months after he was released from serving a year in jail in the aftermath of the Somalia affair.

In March 1998, two boys, Matt Toppi, 17 years of age, and Christopher Brown, 16 years of age, ran away from Robert Land Academy and were killed after being struck by a freight train. The Prince George Citizen reported that "original reports from police indicated that the deaths were part of a suicide pact. But one of the victims' family said they were told Monday by police that Toppi was trying to save the second boy when the pair were hit by the train." Robert Land Academy also came under fire due to some of its students blaming the deaths in part on the stressful and intense, military-like environment at the school.

In January 2001, four teens went AWOL from Robert Land Academy. One youth was quickly apprehended. The remaining three youths spent the night hiding in a barn in Smithville. The next morning, the remaining three youths stole a car and drove it to Toronto where it was abandoned. After calling a parent for help, two of the boys were returned to the school. As punishment, the two youths, ages 17 and 15, spent seven days confined to a hallway of Robert Land Academy and were only allowed a meager diet of limited rations. They were forced to sleep in the hallway and when they weren't sleeping they had to clean the corridor with a steel pad. In court, the Judge stated that "the boys were despondent with their situation at the academy" and "they had not stolen the car out of greed, but as a way to get home". Because of this, the boys were both granted conditional discharges.

As of December 2024, there were over fifty lawsuits pending for alleged sexual and physical abuse. As of October 4, 2025, one lawyer was representing 120 students.

On April 9, 2025, The Walrus reported on the announced closure of RLA. RLA officially announced that the school would be closing in June 2025.

== See also ==
- Education in Ontario
- List of secondary schools in Ontario
