= 2025 Cinéfest Sudbury International Film Festival =

- Opening film: Nirvanna the Band the Show the Movie
- Closing film: John Candy: I Like Me
- Location: Sudbury, Ontario, Canada
- Founded: 1989
- Festival date: September 13–21, 2025
- Website: cinefest.com

Cinéfest Sudbury International Film Festival
- 2026 2024

The 2025 edition of the Cinéfest Sudbury International Film Festival, the 37th edition in the event's history, was held from September 13 to 21, 2025 in Sudbury, Ontario. The first film announcements were released on July 31, and a second set of preview announcements was released on August 14, with the full program announced on August 21.

The first announcement included two world premieres, of the Northern Ontario-shot films A Breed Apart and Violence.

== Awards ==
Winners in the festival's CTV Best in Shorts competition for amateur filmmakers from Northern Ontario were announced on September 21, with winners in the main juried and audience choice categories announced on September 25.

Award	Film	Filmmaker
Audience Choice, Feature Film	Out Standing (Seule au front)	Mélanie Charbonneau
Audience Choice, Feature Film Runner-Up	Once Upon My Mother (Ma mère, Dieu et Sylvie Vartan)	Ken Scott
Audience Choice, Documentary	John Candy: I Like Me	Colin Hanks
Audience Choice, Documentary Runner Up	The Librarians	Kim A. Snyder
Audience Choice, Short Film	Serenity	Frank Tremblay
Audience Choice, Short Film Runner Up	Dish Pit	Anna Hopkins
Outstanding Canadian Feature	Once Upon My Mother (Ma mère, Dieu et Sylvie Vartan)	Ken Scott
Outstanding International Feature	DJ Ahmet	Georgi M. Unkovski
Outstanding Female-Led Feature Film	Out Standing (Seule au front)	Mélanie Charbonneau
Cinema Indigenized Outstanding Talent	Free Leonard Peltier	Jesse Short Bull, David France
French-Language Feature Film	The Cost of Heaven (Gagne ton ciel)	Mathieu Denis
Inspiring Voices and Perspectives	Clear Sky	Shawn Clearsky Davis, Michael Del Monte
Outstanding Short Film	Made for U	Nathanael Draper
Outstanding Animated Short Film	Dolly Baby: Rhythm and Flesh	Bouchera Tahraoui
Outstanding Northern Ontario Short Film	Can You Feel It Now?	Isak Vaillancourt
CTV Best in Shorts, Open Category First Place	Mr. Noah and the Second Flood	Kelly Saxberg
CTV Best in Shorts, Open Category Second Place	Double (Podwójne)	Piotr Skowronski
CTV Best in Shorts, Scholarship	Behind the Screen	Nation North

== Official selections ==
=== Gala Presentations ===
English title	Original title	Director(s)	Production country
Aki		Darlene Naponse	Canada
The Choral		Nicholas Hytner	United Kingdom
Eleanor the Great		Scarlett Johansson	United States
John Candy: I Like Me		Colin Hanks	United States
Nirvanna the Band the Show the Movie		Matt Johnson	Canada
Once Upon My Mother	Ma mère, Dieu et Sylvie Vartan	Ken Scott	Canada, France
Peak Everything	Amour Apocalypse	Anne Émond	Canada
Sentimental Value	Affeksjonsverdi	Joachim Trier	Norway, France, Denmark, Germany, Sweden, United Kingdom
Untitled Home Invasion Romance		Jason Biggs	Canada, United States
Youngblood		Hubert Davis	Canada

=== Special Presentations ===
English title	Original title	Director(s)	Production country
Arco		Ugo Bienvenu	France
Ballistic		Chad Faust	Canada, United States
Blue Moon		Richard Linklater	United States
A Breed Apart		Adam Belanger, David Lafontaine	Canada
Honey Bunch		Madeleine Sims-Fewer, Dusty Mancinelli	Canada
If I Had Legs I'd Kick You		Mary Bronstein	United States
It Was Just an Accident	یک تصادف ساده	Jafar Panahi	Iran, France, Luxembourg
Kiss of the Spider Woman		Bill Condon	United States, Mexico
Lilith Fair: Building a Mystery		Ally Pankiw	Canada
Lovely Day	Mille secrets mille dangers	Philippe Falardeau	Canada
No Other Choice	어쩔수가없다	Park Chan-wook	South Korea
Nouvelle Vague		Richard Linklater	France
Omaha		Cole Webley	United States
The President's Cake	مملكة القصب	Hasan Hadi	Iraq, Qatar, United States
A Private Life	Vie privée	Rebecca Zlotowski	France
Saints and Warriors		Patrick Shannon	Canada
The Secret Agent	O Agente Secreto	Kleber Mendonça Filho	Brazil, France, Netherlands, Germany
Steal Away		Clement Virgo	Canada, Belgium
We'll Find Happiness	On sera heureux	Léa Pool	Canada, Luxembourg

=== Features Canada ===
English title	Original title	Director(s)	Production country
Best Boy		Jesse Noah Klein	Canada
The Bruce Peninsula		Matthew Poitras	Canada
Compulsive Liar 2	Menteuse	Émile Gaudreault	Canada
Dancing on the Elephant		Julia Neil, Jacob Z. Smith	Canada
Deathstalker		Steven Kostanski	Canada, United States
The Cost of Heaven	Gagne ton ciel	Mathieu Denis	Canada
Fanny		Yan England	Canada, Japan
Follies	Folichonneries	Eric K. Boulianne	Canada
Hangashore		Justin Oakey	Canada
It Comes in Waves		Fitch Jean	Canada
Little Lorraine		Andy Hines	Canada
Mile End Kicks		Chandler Levack	Canada
Nobel and the Kid		James Anthony Usas	Canada
Out Standing	Seule au front	Mélanie Charbonneau	Canada
Racewalkers		Kevin Claydon, Phil Moniz	Canada
Space Cadet		Kid Koala	Canada
The Things You Kill		Alireza Khatami	Turkey, Poland, France, Canada
Violence		Connor Marsden	Canada
What We Dreamed of Then		Taylor Olson	Canada
Yunan		Ameer Fakher Eldin	Germany, Canada, Italy, Palestine, Qatar, Jordan, Saudi Arabia

=== Cana-Doc ===
English title	Original title	Director(s)	Production country
Ghosts of the Sea	Les Enfants du large	Virginia Tangvald	Canada, France
Modern Whore		Nicole Bazuin	Canada
Silver Screamers		Sean Cisterna	Canada
Still Single		Jamal Burger, Jukan Tateisi	Canada

=== World Cinema ===
English title	Original title	Director(s)	Production country
Being Maria	Maria	Jessica Palud	France
DJ Ahmet		Georgi M. Unkovski	North Macedonia, Czech Republic, Serbia, Croatia
Everything's Going to Be Great		Jon S. Baird	Canada, United States
Fantasy Life		Matthew Shear	United States
The Great Arch	L'Inconnu de la Grande Arche	Stéphane Demoustier	France, Denmark
Guess Who's Calling!	Le Répondeur	Fabienne Godet	France
Horseshoe		Edwin Mullane, Adam O'Keeffe	Ireland
Köln 75		Ido Fluk	Germany, Poland, Belgium
Little Amélie or the Character of Rain	Amélie et la métaphysique des tubes	Maïlys Vallade, Liane-Cho Han	France
Luz		Flora Lau	China, Hong Kong
The Mastermind		Kelly Reichardt	United States
Mermaid		Tyler Cornack	United States
Merrily We Roll Along		Maria Friedman	United States
My Father's Shadow		Akinola Davies Jr.	United Kingdom, Nigeria
Oh, Hi!		Sophie Brooks	United States
A Poet	Un poeta	Simón Mesa Soto	Colombia, Germany, Sweden
The Scout		Paula González-Nasser	United States
Speak Out	Dans la peau de Cyrano	Jennifer Devoldère	France
Stormskerry Maja	Myrskyluodon Maija	Tiina Lymi	Finland
Urchin		Harris Dickinson	United Kingdom
The Wonderers	Qui brille au combat	Joséphine Japy	France

=== World Doc ===
English title	Original title	Director(s)	Production country
The Librarians		Kim A. Snyder	United States
Orwell: 2+2=5		Raoul Peck	United States, France

=== In Full View: Crisis, Conflict, Conscience ===
English title	Original title	Director(s)	Production country
Blood Lines		Gail Maurice	Canada
Broken Voices	Sbormistr	Ondřej Provazník	Czech Republic
Shamed		Matt Gallagher	Canada

=== Cinema Indigenized (Nishnaabek Dbaajmawaat) ===
English title	Original title	Director(s)	Production country
Clear Sky		Shawn Clearsky Davis, Michael Del Monte	Canada
Free Leonard Peltier		Jesse Short Bull, David France	United States
Nika and Madison		Eva Thomas	Canada
Wrong Husband	Uiksaringitara	Zacharias Kunuk	Canada

=== Short Circuit ===
English title	Original title	Director(s)	Production country
20 Crickets		Zha Babaieva	Canada
Bots		Rich Williamson	Canada
Can You Feel It Now?		Isak Vaillancourt	Canada
Crave		Mark Middlewick	South Africa
Dish Pit		Anna Hopkins	Canada
Dolly Baby: Rhythm and Flesh		Bouchera Tahraoui	Canada
Fan		Philippe Berthelet	Canada
The Human Under the Bed		Euan O'Leary	Canada
Karupy		Kalainithan Kalaichelvan	Canada
Made for U		Nathanael Draper	Canada
My Little Girl	Allez ma fille	Chloé Jouannet	France
Old Tomorrow		Kane Stewart	Canada
Paulie		Aaron Martini	Canada
Pool Sharks		Austin Lindsay	Canada
S.A.D.		Vanessa Sandre	Canada
The Sentry		Jake Wachtel	Cambodia, Norway, United States
Serenity		Frank Tremblay	Canada
A Snowman's Dream		Gus Belford, Steve Belford	Canada
A Strange Bird		Jingwei Bu	China

=== CTV Best in Shorts ===
The festival's dedicated competition for short films by amateur local filmmakers from Northern Ontario.

English title	Original title	Director(s)	Community
After You		Jade Yurich	Goulais River
Again		MJ Dionne	Sudbury
Behind the Screen		Nation North	Garson
Double	Podwójne	Piotr Skowronski	North Bay
The Lake		Steven Schmidt	Chapleau
Love in All the Small Places		Rebeka Herron	Sault Ste. Marie
Mr. Noah and the Second Flood		Kelly Saxberg	Thunder Bay
The Mythical Cave		William C. Cole	Val Caron
State of Mind		Cameron Morin	North Bay
A Witch Named Agatha		Rebeka Herron	Sault Ste. Marie
