= Michel Rainville =

Canadian soldier

Captain Michel Rainville was a Canadian soldier who has courted controversy on several occasions for his orders leading to public outcry. He was ultimately acquitted of criminal charges for his actions, but released from military service.

== Training exercises ==
In February, 1992, Rainville led an assault against the guard room at the entrance of the Citadelle in Quebec City, tying up the guards and taking weapons. This exercise to test the security of the installation had been approved by Lieutenant Colonel Pierre Daigle. However, in 2001 Rainville was convicted of kidnapping, assault and death threats when it was revealed that he tortured and sodomised another soldier during the exercise. He was later sentenced to 20 months imprisonment to be served in the community as a result.

On May 15, 1992, Rainville was the officer in charge of an Escape and Evasion training exercise during which Canada's first female infantry officer, Sandra Perron, along with all the male candidates of the Infantry Basic Officer Course, was tied to a tree barefoot in the snow and punched. Although she did not raise any issue with the training, the incident was reported by Perron's boyfriend and upon leaving the Army photographs were leaked to the media, throwing the Canadian Forces into public disrepute, although Rainville defended himself saying that if he hadn't struck Perron, "she would have lost credibility" with other, male, officers.

He also posed for a media photograph dressed in his Canadian uniform to which he added non-regulation knives; he was later characterized as a "Rambo type".

== Somalia affair ==
The Somalia Affair saw Rainville issue an autonomous 1993 order re-labeling petty thieves at a Canadian military base in Belet Huen as "saboteurs" and authorizing deadly force which resulted in the shooting death of an unarmed Somali named Ahmed Arush. Rainville relied on the argument that a fuel pump used to service American MedEvac helicopters had been stolen deliberately to hinder the military effort, while critics pointed out that any saboteurs likely would have ignited the thousands of gallons of fuel surrounding it.

Rainville had offered to buy a case of beer for the first Canadian to shoot a Somalian, "a six-pack for a wound, 24 for a kill".

On 4 March 1993 as leader of a reconnaissance platoon, Rainville had ordered that food and water be left in a visible location on the base as a "military deception plan", and had enlisted Corporal Ben Klick of the PPCLI to lay in a truck bed at night, awaiting potential "saboteurs" with a rifle. He later defended the placement of food and water by explaining that the material would attract thieves but not saboteurs, enabling his men to distinguish between the two. When Arush and another Somali man approached the food and water and subsequently attempted to run away, they were shot by platoon members Sgt. Plante, Cpl Leclerc and MCpl Countway after Rainville called for soldiers to "get them". Rainville was subsequently charged with unlawfully causing bodily harm and negligent performance of duties. He was acquitted of the charges and later released from the Canadian Forces.

== Later life ==
When he returned to Canada from Somalia, he was convicted of possessing pyrotechnical devices belonging to the Canadian Forces.
