= Statue of Leonard Peltier =

Wood statue by Rigo 23

- Statue in front of Katzen Arts Center, American University, Washington, D.C.
- Artist: Rigo 23
- Medium: Wood
- Subject: Leonard Peltier
- Dimensions: 270 cm (108 in)

The statue of Leonard Peltier, American Indian Movement activist and long-term prisoner, was created by political artist Rigo 23. The piece is based on a self-portrait of Peltier and was created to raise awareness of Peltier's Native American activism, artistry, and his 41 years in prison. The statue stands nine feet tall and is made of redwood and some steel. It includes a base measuring six feet by nine feet, modeled to match the dimensions of a standard prison cell.

Approved for placement on the grounds of the American University in Washington, D.C., in 2016, the statue was brought across the country for placement. On the way, it made stops in various locations such as Standing Rock, Pine Ridge, and Alcatraz Island. During its journey, over five hundred people stood on its feet to show their solidarity for Peltier.

On December 9, 2016, the statue was placed in front of the American University's Katzen Arts Center. Soon after the president of the FBI Agents Association requested its removal. In January 2017, the statue was disassembled and removed from the campus by its administration who issued the statement:

The decision to host the Peltier statue required a more thorough assessment of the implications of placing the piece in a prominent, public space outside the museum. With the benefit of a fuller review, we have made a decision to remove the piece from this location. The subject matter and placement of the piece improperly suggested that American University has assumed an advocacy position of clemency for Mr. Peltier, when no such institutional position has been taken. Further, the nature and location of the piece called into question our ability to honor our responsibilities to ensure the security of the art and the safety of our community.

— American University

The university has agreed to work alongside the artist to find another home for the statue.

https://www.ktvu.com/news/stolen-oakland-u-haul-contained-prized-leonard-peltier-statue
