= Once Upon My Mother =

2025 French-Canadian film

- French: Ma mère, Dieu et Sylvie Vartan
- Directed by: Ken Scott
- Written by: Ken Scott
- Based on: Ma mère, Dieu et Sylvie Vartan by Roland Perez
- Produced by: Sidonie Dumas; Sophie Tepper
- Starring: Jonathan Cohen; Leïla Bekhti; Sylvie Vartan
- Cinematography: Guillaume Schiffman
- Edited by: Dorian Rigal-Ansous; Yvann Thibaudeau
- Music by: Nicolas Errèra
- Production companies: Egérie Productions; Gaumont; Christal Films
- Distributed by: Gaumont (France) Menemsha Films (United States)
- Release dates: 30 January 2025 (Quimper); 19 March 2025 (France); 4 April 2025 (Canada)
- Running time: 102 minutes
- Countries: France; Canada
- Language: French

Once Upon My Mother (French: Ma mère, Dieu et Sylvie Vartan, lit. "My Mother, God and Sylvie Vartan") is a French-Canadian comedy-drama film, directed by Ken Scott and released in 2025. The film was adapted from the 2021 autobiographical novel Ma mère, Dieu et Sylvie Vartan by French lawyer and broadcaster Roland Perez, which centres on his experiences growing up with a clubfoot and a Sephardic Jewish mother who is determined not to let her son's disability stop him from leading a full and successful life. The film received two nominations at the 51st César Awards, including Best Actress for Leïla Bekhti.

== Plot ==
The story centers on Esther Perez (portrayed by Leïla Bekhti), a Moroccan-Jewish immigrant and devoted mother of six. When her newborn son Roland is diagnosed with a clubfoot in 1963 and given a bleak prognosis, She is determined to make him overcome physical challenges and social barriers as she refuses to accept limits placed on his future. With fierce determination and unwavering belief in him, she embarks on a mission to help her son not only overcome challenges but truly thrive.

Roland Perez spent the first seven years of his life crawling on the floor of his family apartment because his mother refused to have him wear leg braces. She tried everything she could to find a cure for his clubfoot, including constant prayer and visits to healers and doctors.

She refused to send him to school until he would be able to walk like any other boy his age, despite warnings from social services that failing to do so could result in him being taken away from her.

Her relentless efforts to find a solution finally paid off when she found a doctor able to treat her son’s foot, though the process required him to remain confined to bed for 18 months. During that time, he spent his days watching television and listening to the songs of Sylvie Vartan.

Vartan, a Bulgarian-born French singer and actress who was enormously popular in France in the 1960s and 1970s, became a source of comfort and inspiration for the young boy. When a social worker insisted that Roland learn how to read, his family used Vartan’s songs to help him identify letters and words.

After all the hardships, Roland and his family overcome his disability together and he goes on to becomes an attorney specializing in intellectual property.

== Cast ==
The film stars Jonathan Cohen as Perez in adulthood, and Leïla Bekhti as his mother.

Child actors Gabriel Hyverneau, Naim Naji and Noé Schecroun play Perez at various ages in childhood, with the cast also including Joséphine Japy, Lionel Dray, Jeanne Balibar, Milo Machado-Graner, Anne Le Ny, Ariane Massenet and Gladys Cohen in supporting roles.

Sylvie Vartan, whose music is used extensively in the film as a recurring motif of Perez's childhood, also makes a brief appearance in the film as herself, and recorded a new version of her song "Nicolas". Perez himself also makes a small appearance in the film as a school director.

== Production ==
Scott, a Canadian director, first became interested in adapting Perez's novel after reading it while in isolation after contracting COVID-19.

The film's production was announced in September 2023, as the first French-language film in which Amazon Prime Video was a production partner.

== Distribution ==
The film premiered on 30 January 2025, as part of the 24th Rencontres Cinématographiques de Bretagne, organized by the association La Règle du Jeu, in Quimper.

The film premiered in Avignon on 13 February 2025.

It was also screened as the opening film of the Love International Film Festival in Mons, Belgium, on 7 March, and at the Luxembourg City Film Festival on 13 March, before opening commercially in France on 19 March.

It reached #1 in the French box office rankings in the week of 30 March 2025, and surpassed 1.4 million tickets sold by 1 May.

It opened commercially in Quebec on 4 April, and received screenings at the Toronto Jewish Film Festival, the Winnipeg Jewish Film Festival, the 2025 Cinéfest Sudbury International Film Festival and the Victoria Jewish Film Festival.

The film will be distributed by Menemsha Films in the United States. It was the Opening Film selections at the 2026 New York Jewish Film Festival, 2026 Atlanta Jewish Film Festival and 2026 Miami Jewish Film Festival, where it received the Audience Award for Best Narrative Film.

== Critical response ==
Maxime Demers of Le Journal de Montréal rated the film 4 out of 5, praising the performances of Cohen and Bekhti and calling it a heartwarming film that conveyed a message of hope in difficult times.

Manon Dumais of La Presse rated the film 7 out of 10, praising Scott's handling of the balance between comedic and dramatic tones.

For Cineuropa, Aurore Engelen was more mixed, writing that "unfortunately, the film chooses to age its actors (and to make them look younger) in a way that risks distracting from the story, especially when it comes to Leïla Bekhti and Jonathan Cohen who are playing a mother and son in the film, despite everyone knowing they're from the same generation. Casting "real" celebrities opposite "real" actors is also problematic, much like the film's tendency to explore tragic events (notably a succession of deaths) from Roland's viewpoint, confining us solely to his perspective to the detriment of the film's other characters, which might prove equally disconcerting for audiences."

== Awards ==
Award	Year	Category	Work	Result	Reference
César Awards	2026	Best Actress	Leïla Bekhti	Nominated	
César Awards	2026	Best Production Design	Riton Dupire-Clément	Nominated	
Cinéfest Sudbury International Film Festival	2025	Audience Choice, Feature Film	Ken Scott	Runner-up	
Cinéfest Sudbury International Film Festival	2025	Outstanding Canadian Feature	Ken Scott	Won	
Quebec Cinema Awards	2025	Best Actress	Leïla Bekhti	Nominated	
Quebec Cinema Awards	2025	Best Hairstyling	Jeanne Milon	Won	
