= Free Leonard Peltier =

- Directed by: Jesse Short Bull; David France
- Produced by: David France; Paul McGuire; Jhane Myers; N. Bird Runningwater
- Starring: Leonard Peltier
- Cinematography: Kyle Bell; Destyn Humann
- Edited by: Adam Evans; Hannah Vanderlan
- Music by: Mato Standing Soldier
- Production company: Public Square Films
- Distributed by: Netflix
- Release dates: January 27, 2025 (Sundance); October 12, 2026 (Netflix)
- Running time: 108 minutes
- Country: United States
- Language: English

Free Leonard Peltier is a 2025 American documentary film, directed by Jesse Short Bull and David France. The film profiles Leonard Peltier, the American Indian Movement activist who spent 49 years in prison for a controversial disputed conviction of murdering two FBI agents on the Pine Ridge Indian Reservation in 1975, before having his sentence commuted to house arrest in 2025, just one week before the film's premiere.

The film premiered at the 2025 Sundance Film Festival on January 27, 2025, and is scheduled to be released on October 12, 2026, by Netflix.

== Critical response ==
Joe Leydon of Variety wrote that "the good news of Peltier's pardon means his long nightmare is finally over. But 'Free Leonard Peltier' makes it very clear what a terrible injustice it has been for the serving of justice to have taken so much time. The final moments might make you smile, or maybe even weep. You'll still feel very angry, however."

For The Hollywood Reporter, Daniel Fienberg wrote that "although the documentary includes no new interviews with Peltier, older interviews are used to complement new conversations with a number of the activists who were at Pine Ridge on the day of the shootout. There's footage from protests and events surrounding the shootout, but when that falls short, the filmmakers use what press notes describe as 'AI recreations.' I'll leave it for others to debate the ethics of the AI choice, but I'll say that the reenactments have no notable visual aesthetic and add very little information. It's a choice to fill space — little more."

Amber Wilkinson of Screen Daily wrote that "the injustice laid bare by this meticulously made and galvanising documentary runs much deeper than that faced by its subject, Leonard Peltier, an Amerian [sic] Indian Movemement [sic] (AIM) activist who was jailed in 1975 for the murder of two FBI agents during a shoot-out at Pine Ridge reservation in North Dakota. While Jesse Short Bull and David France’s film is firmly anchored in Peltier’s story, it also uses his experience as a springboard to highlight the oppression, institutional racism and abuse faced by Native Americans."

== Awards ==
Award	Year	Category	Work	Result	Reference
Thessaloniki Documentary Festival	2025	Silver Alexander	Free Leonard Peltier	Won	
Thessaloniki Documentary Festival	2025	FIPRESCI Prize, International Competition	Free Leonard Peltier	Won	
Thessaloniki Documentary Festival	2025	Amnesty International Best Human Rights Film	Free Leonard Peltier	Won	
Cinéfest Sudbury International Film Festival	2025	Cinema Indigenized Outstanding Talent	Jesse Short Bull, David France	Won	
Vancouver International Film Festival	2025	Audience Award, Insights program	Jesse Short Bull, David France	Won	
