= Frank Blackhorse =

Member of the American Indian Movement

- Born: Francis DeLuca or Frank Leonard Deluca; October 31, 1948 (age 77); Cherokee, North Carolina
- Citizenship: American
- Occupation: Carpenter
- Years active: 1973
- Organization: American Indian Movement
- Known for: Wounded Knee incident Alleged Role in RESMURS
- Parent(s): Kay Goldfein (mother); Frank DeLuca (father)

Frank Blackhorse is one of several aliases used by a member of the American Indian Movement. He is perhaps best known for his participation in the Wounded Knee incident, particularly his role in the shootout that left two FBI and one American Indian dead and for becoming a fugitive on the run who fled to Canada shortly after.

== Early life ==
Much of Frank Blackhorse's early and personal life is shrouded in mystery. According to one source, Blackhorse was born Frank Leonard Deluca. However, another source identifies Blackhorse as being born Francis Deluca. Although Blackhorse self-identifies as a member of the Cherokee nation, some sources state that he is a non-Indian. Also supporting these claims is the FBI, who state that Blackhorse is of Italian ethnicity. Two sources posit that Blackhorse is of Jewish descent. Although Blackhorse claims to have been born in the town of Cherokee, North Carolina, the FBI claims that Blackhorse was born in the city of Cleveland, Ohio.

In addition to the ambiguity surrounding Blackhorse's ethnicity, there is a relatively complex degree involved in ascertaining the exact nature of his identity. Blackhorse has an incredibly long list of aliases which he uses. The list of the aliases includes Francis Blackhorse, Frank DeLuca, Bruce Johnson, Richard Leon High Eagle, Richard Tall Bull, Mike Houston, Michael Houston, Teddy Louis and Teddy Lewis. A previous associate, Father Michael Campagna, affiliated with Campagna Academy (formerly Hoosier Boys' Town of Indiana) of Schererville, Indiana, came across the FBI Wanted Flyer #482, and identifies Blackhorse as Frank L. Deluca, whose original date of birth was 16 October 1954, whose place of birth was in the city of Chicago, Illinois to mother Kay Goldfein and Frank Deluca.

== Wounded Knee ==
On 11 March 1973, FBI Agent Curtis A. Fitzgerald took a bullet wound in the wrist. Although no conclusive evidence existed in regard to who fired the first shot that wounded Fitzgerald, Blackhorse was arrested and charged with shooting Fitzgerald. Later that March, Blackhorse was released on a $10,000.00 cash bond.

On 29 August 1974, a federal grand jury in Sioux Falls, South Dakota, indicted Frank Blackhorse for allegedly shooting FBI Special Agent Curtis A. Fitzgerald at Wounded Knee, South Dakota. Blackhorse failed to make an appearance at the scheduled trial at Council Bluffs and United States District Court Judge Andrew W. Bogue subsequently issued a bench warrant for Black Horse. His lawyer, Martha Copleman, was found in contempt of court regarding Blackhorse's no show for a trial.

Blackhorse's attorney fought to the Supreme Court for the right not to disclose why her client disappeared, a decision that was upheld by the Supreme Court.

=== Jumping Bull Compound shootout ===
Blackhorse was named a suspect in the RESMURS (a portmanteau of Reservation Murders), the name assigned to the investigation into an incident involving a shootout at Jumping Bull Compound and resulting in the murder of two FBI special agents: Jack Coler and Ronald Williams. Blackhorse was wanted by the FBI.

=== Aftermath ===
Leonard Peltier, along with Blackhorse, were arrested by the Royal Canadian Mounted Police in Hinton, Alberta, Canada at the Smallboy's Reserve/Smallboy Camp, transported to Calgary, Alberta, and taken to the Oakalla Prison Farm in Vancouver, British Columbia, on 6 February 1976.

Reports about their extradition to the United States, are conflicting, some say both were extradited, but others state only Peltier was. but charges against Blackhorse related to the RESMURS were dropped. Several sources report that Blackhorse was never extradited. The book Mi Taku'ye-Oyasin: The Native American Holocaust, Volume 2 indicated that Blackhorse fled the United States shortly after witnessing and/or participating in the murder of civil rights activist Ray Robinson and had remained in Canada "under various aliases."

== Current whereabouts ==
While his last known location was in Edmonton, Alberta, Canada, Blackhorse's whereabouts are unknown. According to the book When Will We Ever Learn, Blackhorse disappeared after not being charged in connection to RESMURS. One source indicates that Blackhorse was allowed to "disappear never to be heard from again." Antoinette Nora Claypoole, the author of the Who Would Unbraid Her Hair: the Legend of Annie Mae, a book that explores the events leading up to the murder of Anna Mae Pictou-Aquash and attempts to pinpoint the identity of her murderer, indicated that Blackhorse had disappeared shortly after Peltier's arrest in Canada in 1976.

== Legacy ==
There are many proponents of Peltier's innocence who believe that Blackhorse is the key to securing Peltier's freedom. Blackhorse is believed to have information related to the murder of two FBI agents. Michael Kuzma, a defense attorney representing Peltier, an American Indian Movement activist, has appealed to the public in aiding the attorney in his mission to locate Blackhorse. Kuzma followed the plea up with a lawsuit filed in a federal court in the city of Buffalo, New York.

On 13 May 2004, Kuzma filed an application with the U.S. Department of Justice to obtain the records in its possession pertaining to Blackhorse. On February 10, 2012, on Kuzma's behalf, Peter A. Reese, an attorney who provided assistance to Kuzma in the latter's unsuccessful attempt to secure the release documents via a Freedom of Information request, submitted on documents related to Blackhorse. Another attorney, Daire Brian Irwin, filed a suit in the US District Court in Buffalo, New York, sought an order directing the Justice Department to release the requested records of Blackhorse. Kuzma has also claimed that Blackhorse was an FBI operative sent to infiltrate the ranks of thae Aim and win the trust of its members. According to Kuzma, "The FBI set the wheels in motion that got its agents killed," which he believes happened when informants working on behalf of the agency infiltrated AIM (including Blackhorse), with Kuzma citing a previously obtained document, dated 15 January 1976, in which Deputy Director General (Ops) M. S. Sexsmith of the Royal Canadian Mounted Police wrote to a colleague about Blackhorse's surreptitious provision of information from within the American Indian Movement."

One source, the NPPA (No Parole Peltier Association), criticized Kuzma's efforts to get Peltier paroled by suggesting that Blackhorse was the reason Peltier was criticized. The NPPA points to several facts surrounding Peltier's case such as the fact that Peltier was aware of the individual who turned their group over to the Royal Canadian Mounted Police (old man Yellow bird, who was paid for his collaboration with the RCMP), "Peltier himself says that "the person who was responsible for our arrest was the old man Yellow bird who we learned later was paid for his work by the R.C.M.P," and the fact that Kuzma's discourse on Blackhorse in no way provides proof or connection to Peltier and the murder of Special Agents Coler and Williams.

== See also ==
- List of fugitives from justice who disappeared
