= Out Standing =

2025 Canadian drama film

- French: Seule au front
- Directed by: Mélanie Charbonneau
- Written by: Mélanie Charbonneau; Martine Pagé
- Based on: Outstanding in the Field by Sandra Perron
- Produced by: Marcel Giroux; Julia Rosenberg
- Starring: Nina Kiri; Vincent Leclerc; Antoine Pilon
- Cinematography: Ariel Méthot-Bellemare
- Edited by: Isabelle Malenfant
- Music by: Antoine Rochette
- Production companies: GPA Films; January Films
- Distributed by: Sphere Media
- Release date: September 9, 2025 (TIFF)
- Running time: 107 minutes
- Country: Canada
- Languages: English; French

Out Standing (French: Seule au front) is a Canadian drama film, directed by Mélanie Charbonneau and released in 2025. An adaptation of Sandra Perron's memoir Outstanding in the Field, the film stars Nina Kiri as Perron, adapting to civilian life after resigning from her position with the Canadian Armed Forces amid a media firestorm around allegations, which she refuses to publicly confirm, that she was sexually assaulted.

The cast also includes Vincent Leclerc, Antoine Pilon, Enrico Colantoni, Adrian Walters, Stephen Kalyn, Conrad Pla, Andreas Apergis, Noah Parker, Steve Nash, Nicolas Fontaine, Aniko Kaszas, Hayley Festeryga and Anthony Therrien in supporting roles.

== Production ==
Principal photography took place in spring 2024 across Montreal, the Valcartier military base in Quebec, and Hamilton, Ontario.

== Distribution ==
The film premiered in the Discovery program at the 2025 Toronto International Film Festival on September 9, 2025.

It had its commercial theatrical release across Canada, including Quebec, on September 26, 2025.

== Critical response ==
Overall, critics generally agree that Out Standing succeeds both as a character study and as a critique of systemic misogyny within the military, anchored by a commanding central performance from Nina Kiri.

== Awards ==
| Award | Year | Category | Work | Result | Reference |
|---|---|---|---|---|---|
| Cinéfest Sudbury International Film Festival | 2025 | Audience Choice, Feature Film | Mélanie Charbonneau | Won | |
| Cinéfest Sudbury International Film Festival | 2025 | Outstanding Female-Led Feature Film | Mélanie Charbonneau | Won | |
| Canadian Screen Awards | 2026 | Best Lead Performance in a Drama Film | Nina Kiri | Nominated | |
| Canadian Screen Awards | 2026 | Best Adapted Screenplay | Mélanie Charbonneau, Martine Pagé | Won | |
| Canadian Screen Awards | 2026 | Best Sound Editing | Jane Tattersall, Sue Conley, David Evans | Nominated | |
| Canadian Screen Awards | 2026 | Best Visual Effects | Matt Glover, Dave Sauro | Nominated | |
| ACTRA Toronto Awards | 2026 | Outstanding Performance, Female | Nina Kiri | Won | |
