= A Breed Apart (2025 Canadian film) =

2025 Canadian drama film

- Film poster
- Directed by: Adam Belanger; David Lafontaine
- Written by: Adam Belanger; David Lafontaine
- Produced by: Jordan Barker; Adam Belanger; Borga Dorter; David Lafontaine
- Starring: Joshua Close; Isaac Highams; Stuart Hughes; Krista Bridges
- Cinematography: Adam Madrzyk
- Edited by: Ashley Gilmour
- Production companies: Gearshift Films; Armenta Films
- Release date: September 20, 2025 (Cinéfest)
- Running time: 131 minutes
- Country: Canada
- Language: English

A Breed Apart is a Canadian historical drama film, directed by Adam Belanger and David Lafontaine, and released in 2025. Set in the 1850s, the film stars Joshua Close and Isaac Highams as Sydney and Emmett Tompkins, a father and son from England who have emigrated to Canada and are struggling to cope with the recent death of Sydney's wife and Emmett's mother.

The cast also includes Charlie Storey, Simon Webster, Michael Hough, Krista Bridges, Stuart Hughes, Camille Stopps, James Gilbert, Scott Edgecombe, Tyler Robinson and David Assinewai in supporting roles.

The film was first announced as receiving Telefilm Canada funding in 2023, under the working title Chopping Boy.

The film premiered at the 2025 Cinéfest Sudbury International Film Festival, and went into commercial release in 2026.
