= Adam Belanger =

Canadian production designer

Adam Belanger is a Canadian film, television and theatrical production designer based in Toronto, Ontario. He is most noted for his work on the film BlackBerry, for which he won the Canadian Screen Award for Best Art Direction/Production Design at the 12th Canadian Screen Awards in 2024.

Belanger, who studied theatre at the University of British Columbia, began his career as a production designer for theatrical shows and music videos, often in collaboration with actor and director David Lafontaine of the Unit 102 Theatre Company. In 2018 he directed a production of Lucas Hnath's play Isaac's Eye for Toronto's Assembly Theatre.

He has also been a production designer on the film Wexford Plaza, and the television series Miss Persona, Running with Violet and Nirvanna the Band the Show.

Belanger and Lafontaine co-directed the film A Breed Apart, their joint feature-length filmmaking debut, which premiered at the 2025 Cinéfest Sudbury International Film Festival.
