= Mark Adam Boland =

Canadian soldier

- Occupations: Canadian soldier, school instructor
- Known for: Involvement in the death of Shidane Abukar Arone during the Somalia affair
- Status: Convicted
- Allegiance: Canadian Forces
- Criminal charges: Negligent performance of duty, torture
- Penalty: 1 year imprisonment, reduction in rank to private, dismissal from the Canadian Forces

Mark Adam Boland is a former Canadian soldier who was convicted of negligent performance of duty and discharged from the Canadian Forces for his role in the death of Shidane Abukar Arone in the Somalia affair. He later worked as an instructor at the now defunct private school Robert Land Academy, which closed after lawsuits alleged that staff abused children.

== Somalia affair ==
In the Somalia affair, Sergeant Mark Boland was responsible for guarding the 16-year-old Somali Shidane Abukar Arone, who was caught hiding in an abandoned US military base on March 16, 1993, next to the Canadian base where Boland was stationed. When Boland arrived to replace Master Corporal Clayton Matchee on guard duty, he ordered that Arone's bindings be loosened. Matchee took this opportunity to remove the captive's clothing and use it to waterboard the youth, until Boland objected and Matchee left the bunker where Arone was being held. After Trooper Kyle Brown took over guard duty and punched Arone in the jaw, he was told by Boland, "I don't care what you do, just don't kill the guy." Boland then joined Master Corporal Clayton Matchee and Matt McKay for beers in the base's mess hall, where Matchee and McKay described ways to torture Arone. Brown and Matchee then tortured Arone who died from his injuries.

Boland was later charged with negligent performance of duty and torture for his role in the death of Shidane Arone. In April 1994, he was convicted by a court-martial panel of negligent performance of duty and sentenced to 90 days' detention, a penalty that included automatic reduction in rank to private. After an appeal by the prosecution, his sentence was increased to one year's imprisonment, and he was dismissed from the Canadian Forces.

== Later life ==
A few months after being released from prison in 1995, Mark Boland started working as a non-classroom instructor in the military-style private boys school Robert Land Academy in Ontario, Canada. He was alleged by a former student to have ordered boys to expose themselves to him during cold temperatures. Robert Land Academy faced lawsuits alleging that physical and emotional abuse were committed by staff, and it shut down in June 2025.
