= David Lafontaine =

Canadian actor, writer and theatre director

David Lafontaine is a Canadian actor, writer and theatre director, most noted as artistic director of the Unit 102 Theatre Company in Toronto.

His credits as an actor with the company have included productions of Sam Shepard's The Late Henry Moss and Michael Ross Albert's The Huns. As a director he helmed productions of Kenneth Lonergan's Lobby Hero, Stephen Adly Guirgis's The Last Days of Judas Iscariot, and Michael Ross Albert's Miss. He has also had supporting roles in film and television.

Lafontaine and his frequent theatre colleage Adam Belanger co-wrote and co-directed the film A Breed Apart, their joint feature-length filmmaking debut, which premiered at the 2025 Cinéfest Sudbury International Film Festival.
