= Leonard Peltier =

Native American activist (born 1944)

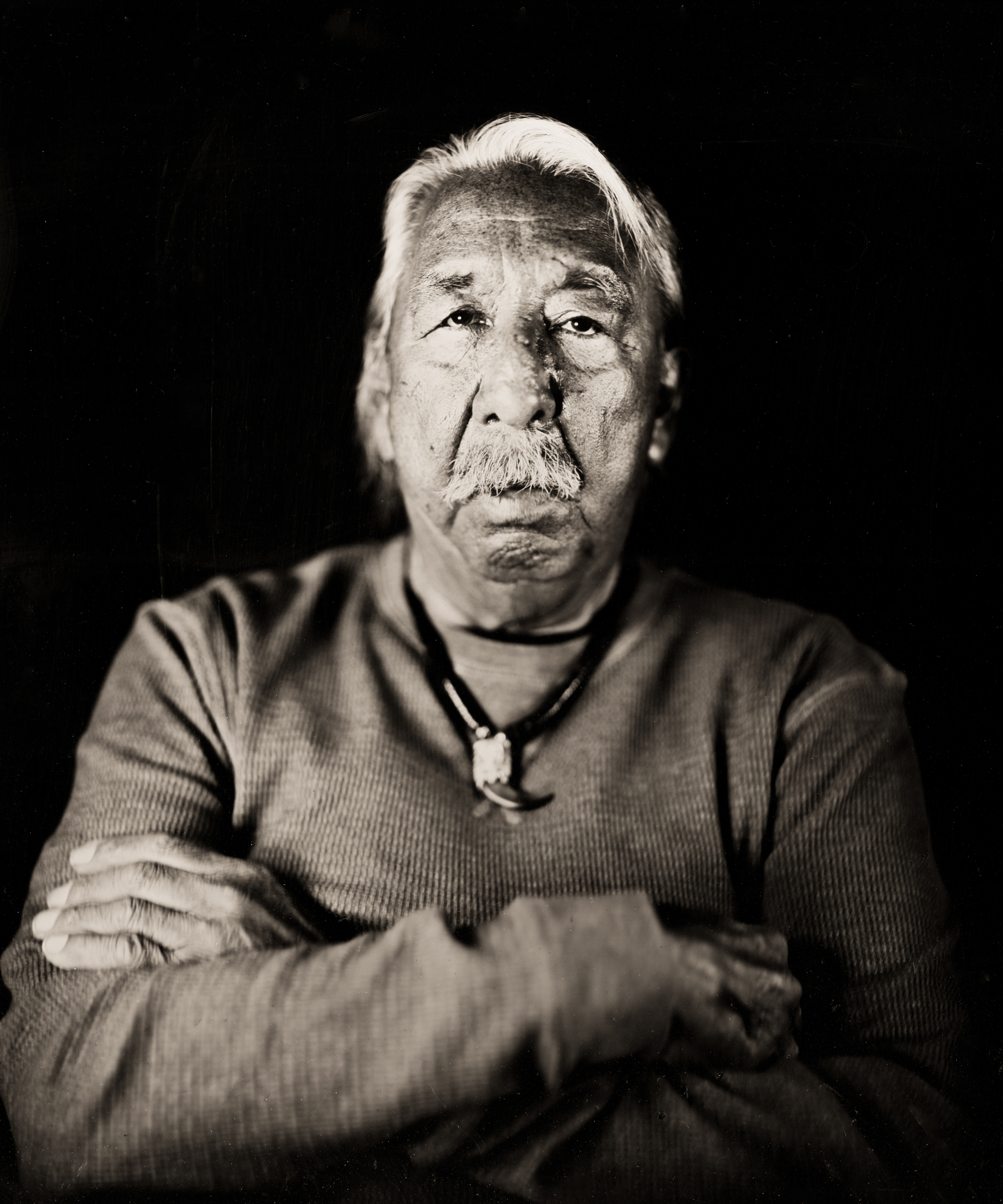
- Peltier in 2025
- Born: September 12, 1944 (age 82); Belcourt, North Dakota, U.S.
- Other names: Tate WiWikuwa, Gwarth-ee-lass
- Movement: American Indian Movement
- Children: 9
- Conviction: First degree murder of a federal employee (2 counts)
- Penalty: 2 consecutive life sentences; commuted to indefinite house arrest after 49 years of incarceration

Leonard Peltier (born September 12, 1944) is a Native American activist and member of the American Indian Movement (AIM) who was convicted of murdering two Federal Bureau of Investigation (FBI) agents in a June 26, 1975, shooting on the Pine Ridge Indian Reservation in South Dakota. He was sentenced to two consecutive terms of life imprisonment. Peltier became eligible for parole in 1993.

In his 1999 memoir Prison Writings: My Life Is My Sun Dance, Peltier admitted to participating in the shootout but said he did not kill the FBI agents. Human rights watchdogs, such as Amnesty International, and spiritual leaders including the 14th Dalai Lama, campaigned for clemency for Peltier.

At the time of the shootout, Peltier was an active member of AIM, an Indigenous rights advocacy group that worked to combat the racism and police brutality experienced by Native Americans.

On January 19, 2025, Peltier's sentence was commuted to indefinite house arrest by President Joe Biden shortly before he left office. On February 18, the date specified by the grant of clemency, Peltier was released and transferred to the Turtle Mountain Indian Reservation in Belcourt, North Dakota.

== Early life and education ==
Peltier was born on September 12, 1944, at the Turtle Mountain Indian Reservation of the Turtle Mountain Chippewa near Belcourt, North Dakota. He is of Lakota, Dakota, and Anishinaabe descent, and was raised among the Turtle Mountain Chippewa and Fort Totten Sioux Nations of North Dakota. He was one of 13 children. His parents divorced when he was four years old, with Leonard and his sister Betty Ann living with their paternal grandparents Alex and Mary Dubois-Peltier in the Turtle Mountain Indian Reservation.

In September 1953, Leonard was enrolled at the Wahpeton Indian School in Wahpeton, North Dakota, an Indian boarding school run by the Bureau of Indian Affairs (BIA). The school, which was located 290 miles (470 km) away from his home in the Turtle Mountain Reservation, practiced forced cultural assimilation of Indigenous children into white American culture by requiring the children to use English and forbidding the inclusion of Native American culture. He graduated from Wahpeton in May 1957 and then attended the Flandreau Indian School in Flandreau, South Dakota. After finishing the ninth grade, he returned to the Turtle Mountain Reservation to live with his father. Peltier later obtained a general educational development (GED) certification (an alternative to a high school diploma).

== Career and activism ==
In 1965, Peltier relocated to Seattle, Washington. Peltier worked as a welder, a construction worker, and as the co-owner of an auto shop in Seattle in his twenties. The co-owners used the upper level of the building as a stopping place, or halfway house, for American Indians who had alcohol addiction issues or had recently finished their prison sentences and were re-entering society. The halfway house took a financial toll on the shop, so they closed it.

In Seattle, Peltier became involved in a variety of causes championing Native American civil rights. In the early 1970s, he learned about the factional tensions at the Pine Ridge Indian Reservation in South Dakota between supporters of Richard Wilson, elected tribal chairman in 1972, and traditionalist members of the Lakota tribe. It was Dennis Banks who first invited Leonard Peltier to join AIM. Consequently, Peltier became an official member of the American Indian Movement (AIM) in 1972, which was founded by urban Indians in Minneapolis in 1968, at a time of rising Indian activism for civil rights.

Wilson had created a private militia, known as the Guardians of the Oglala Nation (GOON), whose members were reputed to have assaulted political opponents. In Peltier's view, the targets of the GOON attacks were AIM supporters and traditionalists. Protests over a failed impeachment hearing of Wilson contributed to the AIM and Lakota armed takeover of Wounded Knee at the reservation in February 1973. Federal forces reacted, conducting a 71-day siege, which became known as the Wounded Knee Occupation. Protestors demanded the resignation of Wilson. Peltier, however, spent most of the occupation in a Milwaukee, Wisconsin jail charged with attempted murder related to a different protest. When Peltier secured bail at the end of April, he took part in an AIM protest outside the federal building in Milwaukee and was on his way to Wounded Knee with the group to deliver supplies when the incident ended.

In 1975, Peltier traveled as a member of AIM to the Pine Ridge Indian Reservation to help reduce violence among political opponents. At the time, he was a fugitive, with an arrest warrant having been issued in Milwaukee, Wisconsin. It charged him with unlawful flight to avoid prosecution for the attempted murder of an off-duty Milwaukee police officer. (He was acquitted of the attempted murder charge in February 1978.)

During this period, Peltier had seven children from two marriages and adopted two children.

== Shootout at Pine Ridge ==
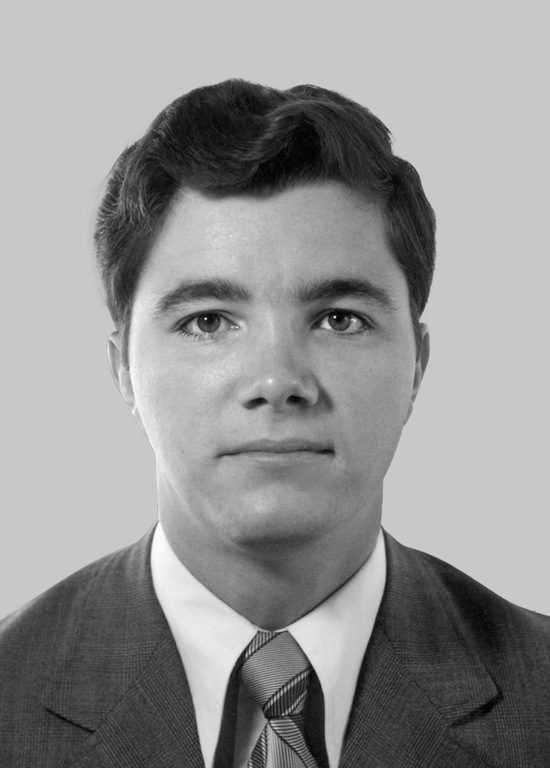
Ronald Arthur Williams

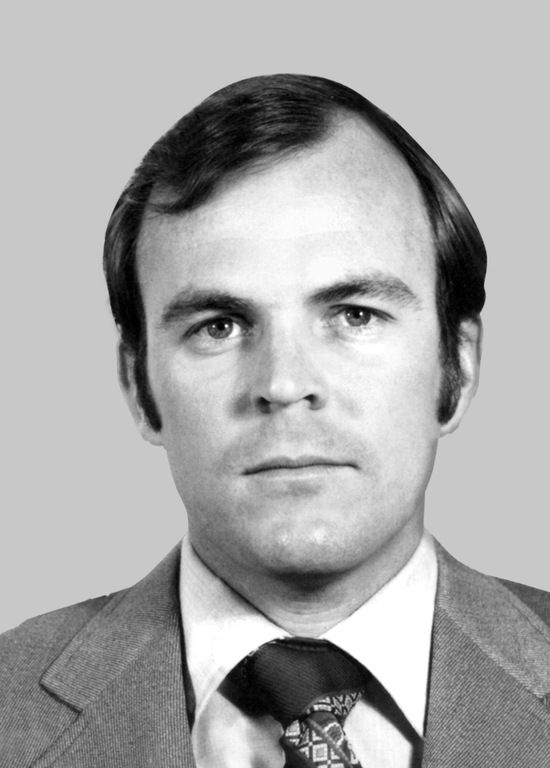
Jack Ross Coler

On June 26, 1975, FBI Special Agents Ronald Arthur Williams and Jack Ross Coler returned to Pine Ridge to continue searching for a young man named Jimmy Eagle. According to FBI publications, he was wanted for questioning in connection with the recent assault of two local ranch hands and theft of a pair of cowboy boots.

Around 11:50 a.m., Williams and Coler, driving two separate unmarked cars, radioed that they were following a white and red Chevrolet Suburban Carryall, reportedly carrying Peltier, Norman Charles, and Joe Stuntz. Peltier had an outstanding federal warrant for the attempted murder of a Milwaukee police officer, although Williams and Coler were not aware of this. Charles had met with Williams and Coler the evening before, when the agents explained to Charles they were looking for Eagle. After turning off US 18 into the Jumping Bull Ranch, where the Jumping Bull family had allowed AIM to camp, the occupants of the Suburban stopped and exited the vehicle. A firefight ensued.

According to other FBI agents' recollection of radio transmissions (none of which were revorded), Williams radioed to a local dispatch that he and Coler had come under fire from the vehicle's occupants and would be killed if reinforcements did not arrive. He next radioed that they both had been shot. FBI Special Agent Gary Adams was the first to respond to Williams' call for assistance from twelve miles (19 km) away. But he and the other responding BIA officers also came under gunfire. They were unable to reach Coler and Williams in time, as both agents died within the first ten minutes of gunfire. It was not until about 4:25 p.m. that authorities recovered the bodies of Williams and Coler from Coler's vehicle. The FBI has stated that Norman Charles fired at the agents with a stolen British .308 rifle, and Peltier from an AR-15 rifle. The two agents had fired a total of five shots: two from Williams' handgun, one from Coler's handgun, one from Coler's rifle, and one from Coler's shotgun. In total, 125 bullet holes were found in the agents' vehicles, many from a .223 Remington AR-15 rifle. Coler was 28 years old and Williams was 27.

The FBI reported that Williams received a defensive wound to his right hand (as he attempted to shield his face) from a bullet that passed through his hand into his head. Williams was shot in the body and foot, before the lethal contact shot to the head. Coler, incapacitated from earlier bullet wounds, was shot twice in the head.

Williams's car was driven into the AIM camp farther south on the Jumping Bull property and stripped. The agents' guns were stolen. Allegedly, Darrelle Butler took Williams' handgun, Peltier took Coler's, and Robert Robideau took Coler's .308 and shotgun. Stuntz was found wearing Coler's FBI jacket after he was shot and killed by a BIA agent later that day.

=== Aftermath ===
At least three men were arrested in connection with the shooting: Peltier, Robert Robideau, and Darrelle "Dino" Butler, all AIM members who were present at the Jumping Bull compound at the time of the shootings.

Peltier provided numerous alibis to several people about his activities on the morning of the attacks. In an interview for Peter Matthiessen's 1983 book In the Spirit of Crazy Horse, Peltier described working on a car in Oglala, claiming he had driven back to the Jumping Bull Compound about an hour before the shooting started. In an interview with Lee Hill, though, he described being awakened in his tent at the ranch encampment by the sound of gunshots; but to Harvey Arden, for Prison Writings, he described enjoying the beautiful morning before he heard the firing. In his 1999 memoir Prison Writings: My Life Is My Sun Dance, Peltier admitted to participating in the shootout but said he did not kill the FBI agents.

On September 5, Butler was arrested; Agent Williams' handgun and ammunition were recovered from an automobile in the vicinity. Four days later, Peltier bought a station wagon. The following day, AIM member Robideau, (Note: Robideau died February 17, 2009, in Spain from seizures related to brain injuries from the car explosion.) Charles and Anderson were injured in the accidental explosion of ammunition from Peltier's station wagon on the Kansas Turnpike close to Wichita. Coler's .308 and an AR-15 were found in the burned vehicle. The FBI forwarded a description of a recreational vehicle (RV) and Peltier's Plymouth station wagon to law enforcement during the hunt for the suspects. The RV was stopped by an Oregon state trooper, but the driver, later discovered to be Peltier, fled on foot after a small shootout. Peltier's thumbprint and Coler's handgun were discovered under the RV's front seat.

== Trial ==
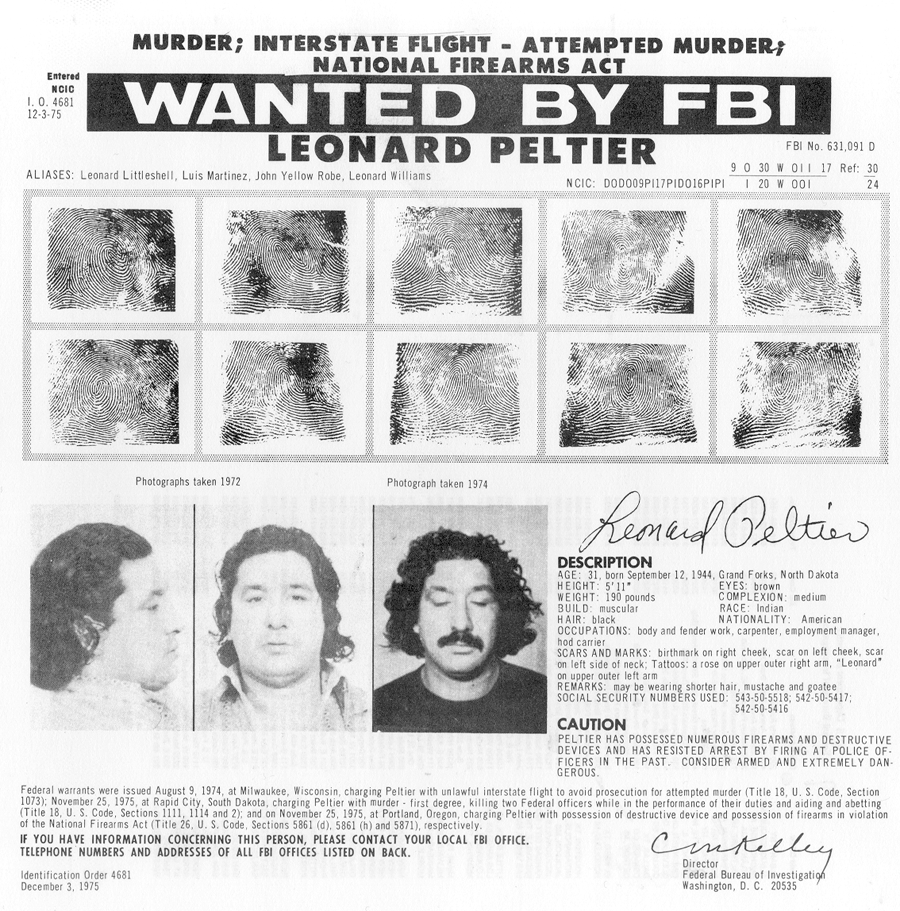
FBI wanted poster for Leonard Peltier

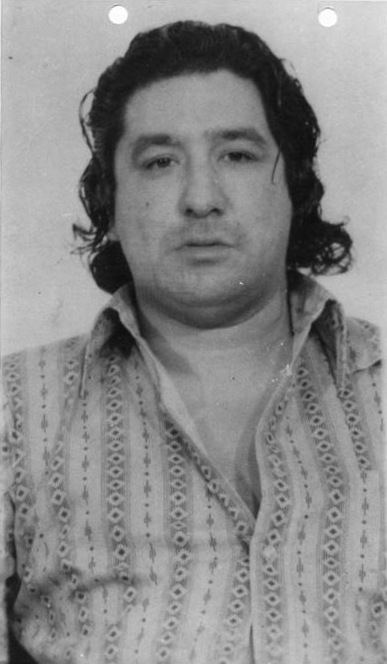
Peltier mug shot

On December 22, 1975, Peltier was named to the FBI Ten Most Wanted Fugitives list. On February 6, 1976, Peltier was arrested along with Frank Blackhorse by the Royal Canadian Mounted Police in Hinton, Alberta, Canada at the Smallboy Camp, transported to Calgary, Alberta and taken to the Oakalla Prison Farm in Vancouver, British Columbia.

In December 1976, Peltier was extradited from Canada based on documents submitted by the FBI. Warren Allmand, Canada's Solicitor General at the time, later stated that these documents contained false information. (Blackhorse was also extradited to the United States, but charges against him related to the reservation shootout were dropped.) One of the documents relied on in Peltier's extradition was an affidavit signed by Myrtle Poor Bear, a Native American woman local to the area near Pine Ridge Reservation. While Poor Bear stated that she was Peltier's girlfriend during that time and had watched the killings, Peltier and others at the scene said that Poor Bear did not know Peltier and was not present during the murders. Poor Bear later admitted to lying to the FBI, but said the agents interviewing her had coerced her into making the claims. When Poor Bear tried to testify against the FBI, the judge barred her testimony because of mental incompetence. However, the Canadian government later reviewed the extradition and concluded it had been lawful since "the circumstantial evidence presented at the extradition hearing, taken alone, constituted sufficient evidence to justify Mr. Peltier's committal on two murder charges."

Peltier fought extradition to the United States. Robideau and Butler were acquitted on grounds of self-defense by a federal jury in Cedar Rapids, Iowa since the forensic evidence showed they had not been the ones to execute the agents and the government had no witnesses at the time who could prove they knew they were attacking FBI officers. This was not the case in Peltier's trial, where the FBI had forensic evidence and eyewitnesses that together linked Peltier directly to the killings of the officers.

Peltier's trial was held in Fargo, North Dakota, where a jury convicted him of the murders of Coler and Williams. Unlike in the trial for Butler and Robideau, the FBI produced forensic evidence that the two FBI agents were killed by close-range shots to their heads, when they were already defenseless because of previous gunshot wounds. Consequently, Peltier could not submit a self-defense testimony like the other activists had. The jury was also shown autopsy and crime scene photographs of the two agents, which had not been shown to the jury at Cedar Rapids. In April 1977, Peltier was convicted and sentenced to two consecutive life sentences.

Some organizations have raised doubts about Peltier's guilt and the fairness of his trial, based on alleged inconsistencies in the FBI and prosecution's handling of the case. Two witnesses in the initial trial recanted their statements and stated they were made under duress at the hands of the FBI. At least one witness was given immunity from prosecution in exchange for testimony against Peltier.

During a June 8, 2024, interview by Native News Online, Peltier's serving attorney Kevin Sharp – who has also served as U.S. District Judge for the Middle District of Tennessee from 2011 to 2017, including as Chief Judge from 2014 to 2017 – stated the following:

"Pine Ridge was a powder keg with the Goon Squad operating there with the government's help. AIM was there to protect those who were not part of the Goon Squad. There were many murders and assaults in a three-year timeframe. When plain-clothed agents in unmarked cars arrived, a firefight ensued. Leonard did not shoot the agents, and the FBI knew this but withheld evidence. The court of appeals acknowledged this but couldn't overturn the conviction due to legal standards. Judge Heaney, who wrote the opinion, later supported clemency for Leonard. Now, 38 of Judge Heaney's former clerks support parole for Leonard, including three who worked on his case. The government admits they don't know who killed the agents, but it wasn't Leonard. It's time to release Leonard and start the healing process."

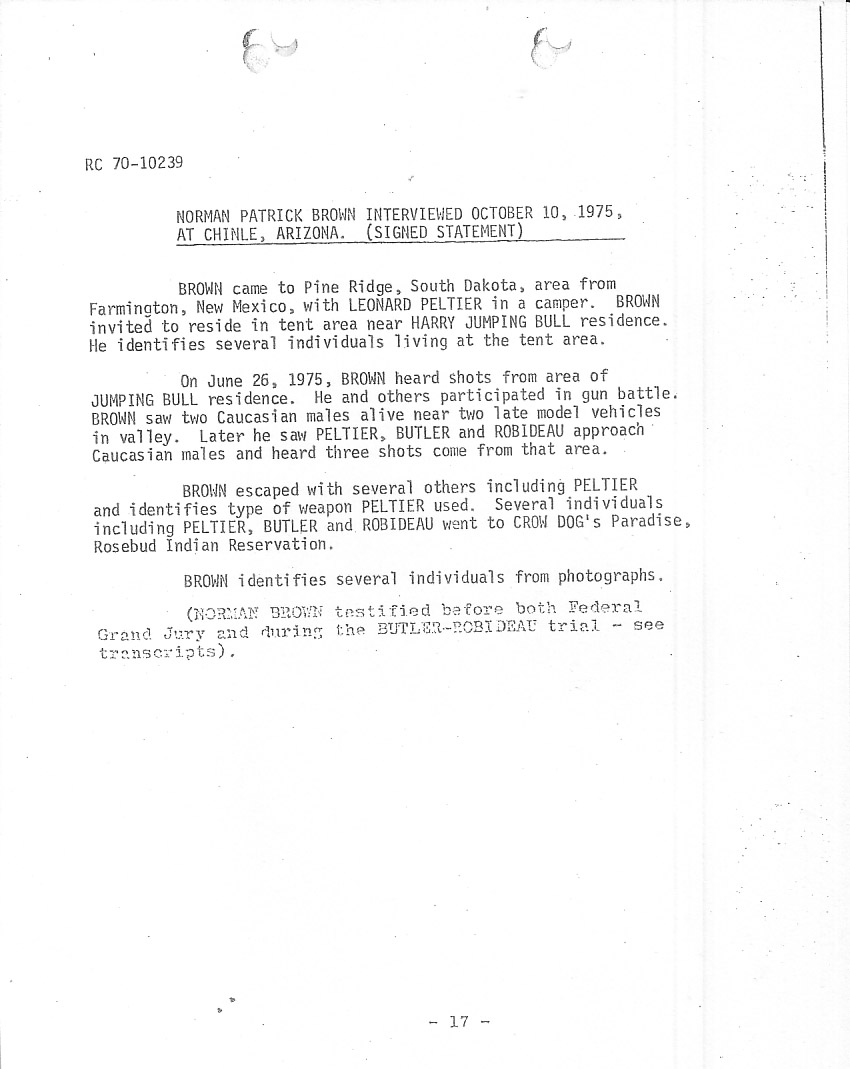
FBI affidavit of Norman Patrick Brown

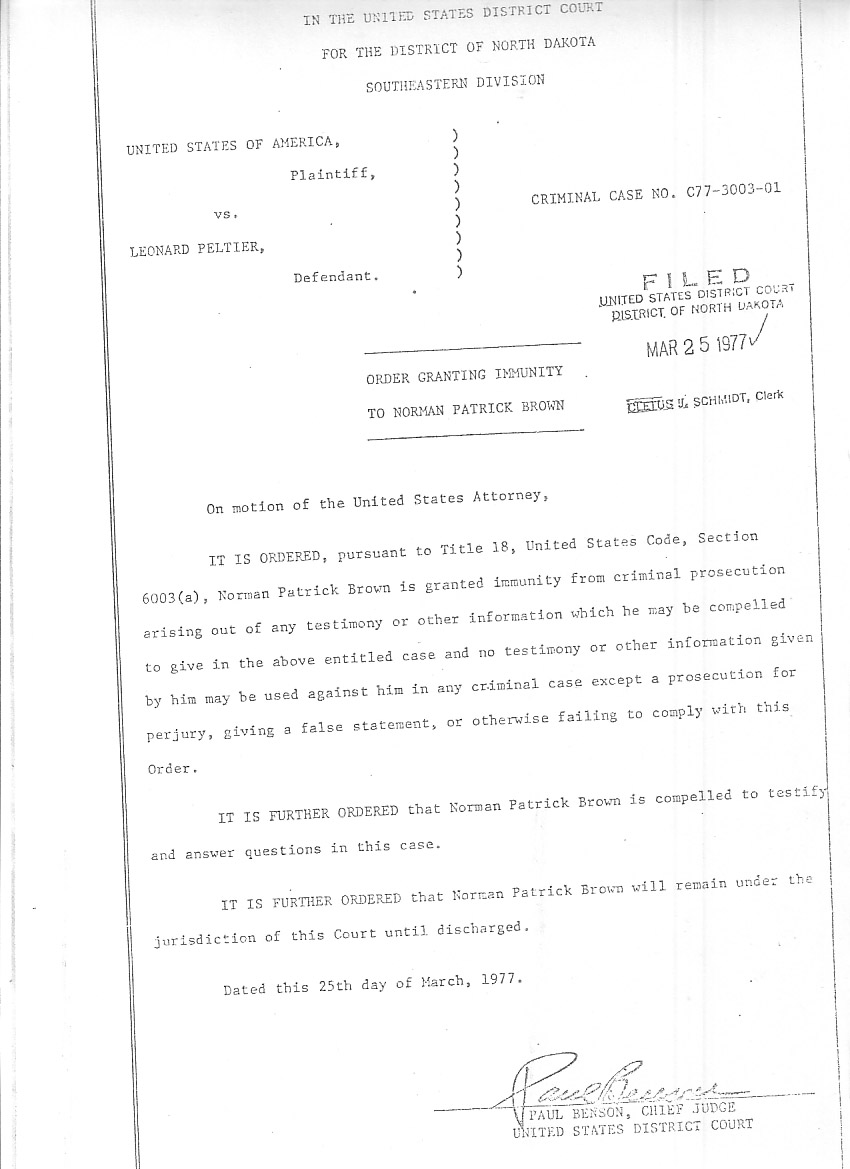
Order granting immunity from prosecution to Norman Patrick Brown, in exchange for his testimony in Leonard Peltier's criminal trial

=== Alleged discrepancies in material evidence ===
FBI radio intercepts indicated that the two FBI agents Williams and Coler had entered the Pine Ridge Reservation in pursuit of a suspected thief in a red pickup truck. The FBI confirmed this claim the day after the shootout, but red pickup trucks near the reservation had been stopped for weeks, and Leonard Peltier did not drive a red pickup truck. Evidence was given that Peltier was driving a Chevrolet Suburban; a large sport utility vehicle built on a pickup truck chassis, with an enclosed rear section. Peltier's vehicle was orange with a white roof – not a red open-bed pickup truck with no white paint.

At Peltier's trial, FBI agents changed their previous statements that they had been in search of a red pickup truck and instead said they were looking for an orange and white van, similar to the one Peltier drove. This contradictory statement by the FBI was a highly contentious matter of evidence in the trials.

Though the FBI's investigation indicated that an AR-15 was used to kill the agents, several different AR-15s were in the area at the time of the shootout. Also, no other cartridge cases or evidence about them was offered by the prosecutor's office, though other bullets were fired at the crime scene. However, the appeals court confirmed his conviction in 1986, noting that even though later evidence suggested there were multiple AR-15s in the area, the government's expert witness had testified during the trial that he could not match 14 shell casings to the AR-15 that killed the agents. The appeals court stated further that the fact was ultimately irrelevant given these shells were ejected in locations such that "it would have been very difficult, if not impossible, for anyone to have fired at Coler and Williams from these points", instead concluding that "it is more likely that these casings were ejected from an AR-15 in the fire fight that occurred after Coler and Williams were killed and other agents had joined in the shooting."

During the trial, all the bullets and bullet fragments found at the scene were provided as evidence and detailed by Cortland Cunningham, FBI firearms expert, in testimony (Ref US v. Leonard Peltier, Vol 9). Years later, in 2004, a request under the Freedom of Information Act prompted another examination of the FBI ballistics report used to convict Peltier. An impartial expert evaluated the firing pin linked to the gun that shot Williams and Coler and concluded that some cartridge cases from the scene of the crime did not come from the rifle tied to Peltier. Again, the appeals court rejected the defense's argument, because the information included in the FOIA request "did not refer to the .223 casing found in the agents' car, but to other casings found at the scene." The court concluded that given the immaterial nature of this new evidence, it was not probable that the jury would have reached a different verdict had that information been available.

=== 1979 prison escape ===
Peltier began serving his sentences in 1977. On July 20, 1979, he and two other inmates escaped from Federal Correctional Institution, Lompoc. One inmate was shot dead by a guard outside the prison and another was captured 90 minutes later, approximately 1 mile (1.6 km) away. Peltier remained at large until he was captured by a search party three days later near Santa Maria, California, after a farmer alerted authorities that Peltier, armed with a Ruger Mini-14 rifle, had consumed some of his crops and stolen his shoes, wallet, and pickup truck key. Peltier attempted to drive the truck away at high speed down the rough gravel road, resulting in a broken transmission, after which he again fled on foot. Peltier was later apprehended without incident. After a six-week trial held in Los Angeles before Judge Lawrence T. Lydick, Peltier was convicted and sentenced to serve a five-year sentence for escape and a two-year sentence for a felon in possession of a firearm, in addition to his preexisting two life sentences.

== Clemency and commutation of sentence ==
=== Support for clemency ===
Peltier's conviction sparked great controversy and drew criticism from a number of prominent figures across a wide range of disciplines. In 1999, Peltier asserted on CNN that he did not commit the murders and does not know who did. Peltier has described himself as a political prisoner. Numerous public and legal appeals were filed on his behalf, but none of the resulting rulings were made in his favor. His appeals for clemency received support from world-famous civil rights advocates, including Archbishop Desmond Tutu, Rev. Jesse Jackson, Tenzin Gyatso (the 14th Dalai Lama), and Nobel Peace Prize Laureate and activist Rigoberta Menchú. International and national government entities such as the Office of the United Nations High Commissioner on Human Rights, the United Nations Working Group on Indigenous Populations, the European Parliament, and the Belgian Parliament, have all passed resolutions in favor of Peltier's clemency. Several human rights groups, including the International Federation for Human Rights and Amnesty International launched campaigns advocating for Peltier's clemency. In the United States, the Kennedy Memorial Center for Human Rights, the Committee of Concerned Scientists, Inc., the National Lawyers Guild, and the American Association of Jurists are all supporters of clemency for Peltier.

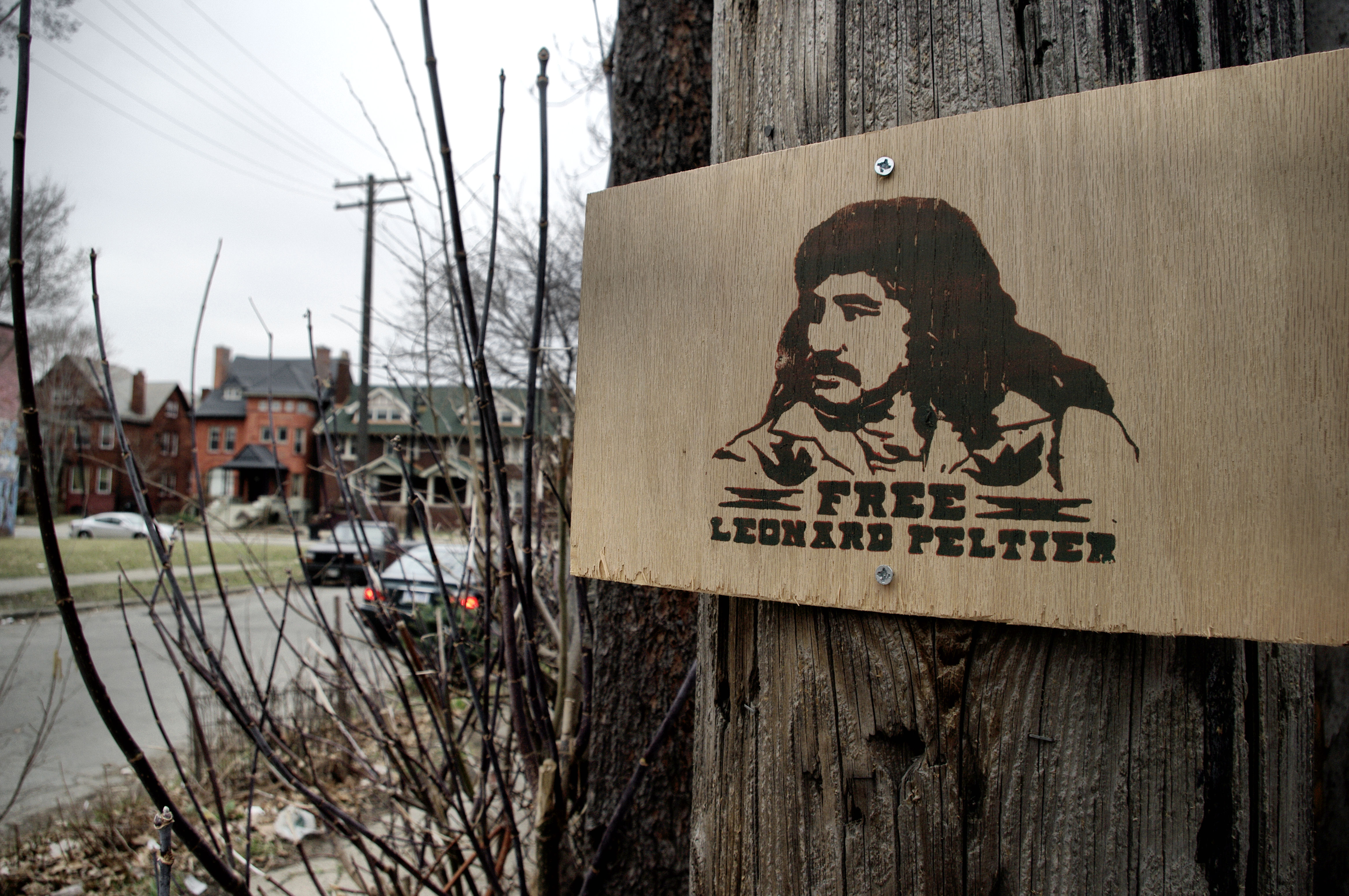
Free Leonard Peltier sign, March 2009

The police officer who arrested Peltier, Bob Newbrook, is convinced that he "was extradited illegally and that he didn't get a fair trial in the United States".

On June 7, 2022, the United Nations Human Rights Council's Working Group on Arbitrary Detention released a seventeen-page analysis of Peltier's detention, rendering the opinion that it contravenes "articles 2, 7, and 9 of the Universal Declaration of Human Rights and articles 2 (1), 9 and 26 of the International Covenant on Civil and Political Rights, is arbitrary and falls within categories III and V." The Working Group urged a "full and independent investigation" surrounding his detention and requested that the US government remedy his situation "without delay and bring it into conformity with the relevant international norms".

=== Clemency denial and commutation ===
In 1999, Peltier filed a habeas corpus petition, but it was rejected by the 10th Circuit Court on November 4, 2003. Near the end of the Clinton administration in 2001, rumors began circulating that Bill Clinton was considering granting Peltier clemency. Opponents of Peltier campaigned against his possible clemency; about 500 FBI agents and families protested outside the White House, and FBI director Louis Freeh sent a letter opposing Peltier's clemency to the White House. Clinton did not grant Peltier clemency. In 2002, Peltier filed a civil rights lawsuit in the U.S. District Court for the District of Columbia against the FBI, Louis Freeh and FBI agents who had participated in the campaign against his clemency petition, alleging that they "engaged in a systematic and officially sanctioned campaign of misinformation and disinformation." On March 22, 2004, the suit was dismissed. In January 2009, President George W. Bush denied Peltier's clemency petition before leaving office.

In 2016, Peltier's attorneys filed a clemency application with the White House's Office of the Pardon Attorney, and his supporters organized a campaign to convince President Barack Obama to commute Peltier's sentence, a campaign which included an appeal by Pope Francis, as well as James H. Reynolds, a senior attorney and former US Attorney who supervised the prosecution against Peltier in the appeal period following his initial trial. In a letter to the United States Department of Justice, Reynolds wrote that clemency was "in the best interest of justice in considering the totality of all matters involved". In a subsequent letter to the Chicago Tribune, Reynolds added that the case against Peltier "was a very thin case that likely would not be upheld by courts today. It is a gross overstatement to label Peltier a 'cold-blooded murderer' on the basis of the minimal proof that survived the appeals in his case." On January 18, 2017, two days before Obama left office, the Office of the Pardon Attorney announced that Obama had denied Peltier's application for clemency. On June 8, 2018, KFGO Radio in Fargo, N.D., reported that Peltier filed a formal clemency request with President Trump. KFGO obtained and published a letter that was sent by Peltier's attorney to the White House. On July 9, 2021, Reynolds wrote a letter to Biden in which he stated: "I have realized that the prosecution and continued incarceration of Mr. Peltier was and is unjust. We were not able to prove that Mr. Peltier personally committed any offense on the Pine Ridge Reservation."

On February 6, 2023, Leonard Peltier again made a plea for clemency.

On June 10, 2024, Peltier had his first parole hearing since 2009. Ahead of the hearing, his lawyer Kevin Sharp described the hearing as "probably" his "last chance" to make a case for parole. On July 2, 2024, he was denied parole. An interim hearing to discuss parole was set for 2026, while another full hearing was set for 2039, according to Sharp. From 2014 until 2025, Peltier was housed at Coleman I, the high-security penitentiary wing of the Coleman Federal Correctional Complex in Coleman, Florida.

=== Presidential commutation and release from prison ===
Clemency granted by President Biden on January 19, 2025 which became effective on February 18, 2025

On January 19, 2025, the last full day of his presidency, Joe Biden commuted Peltier's life sentence to home confinement beginning on February 18, 2025. Peltier was released on that date. His son said that the Turtle Mountain Band has a home arranged for him on the reservation in Belcourt, North Dakota. Upon his release, Peltier's younger sister Shelia confirmed to the Minnesota-based newspaper Star Tribune that he opted to be transferred to the Turtle Mountain Indian Reservation in Belcourt, North Dakota, where he could reunite with his family more. On February 19, 2025, Peltier spoke publicly at Belcourt's Sky Dance Casino and Resort during an event welcoming him home.

Despite being officially under home confinement, Peltier has at times since his release been able to travel outside of North Dakota and even appear at public events in South Dakota and Minneapolis, Minnesota. In August 2025, Star Tribune journalist Kim Hyatt described Peltier as being "mostly free" since his release.

== Other concerns and incidents ==
=== 2002 editorial about deaths of agents and Anna Mae Aquash ===
In January 2002 in the News from Indian Country, publisher Paul DeMain wrote an editorial that an "unnamed delegation" told him that Peltier had murdered the FBI agents. DeMain described the delegation as "grandfathers and grandmothers, AIM activists, pipe carriers and others who have carried a heavy unhealthy burden within them that has taken its toll." DeMain said he was also told that the motive for the execution-style murder of high-ranking AIM activist Anna Mae Aquash in December 1975 at Pine Ridge "allegedly was her knowledge that Leonard Peltier had shot the two agents, as he was convicted."

DeMain did not accuse Peltier of participation in the Aquash murder. In 2003 two Native American men were indicted and later convicted of the murder.

On May 1, 2003, Peltier sued DeMain for libel for similar statements about the case published on March 10, 2003, in News from Indian Country. On May 25, 2004, Peltier withdrew the suit after he and DeMain settled the case. DeMain issued a statement saying he did not think Peltier was given a fair trial for the two murder convictions, nor did he think Peltier was connected to Aquash's death. DeMain stated he did not retract his allegations that Peltier was guilty of the murders of the FBI agents and that the motive for Aquash's murder was the fear that she might inform on the activist.

=== Indictments and trials for the murder of Aquash ===
In 2003, there were federal grand jury hearings on charges against Arlo Looking Cloud and John Graham for the kidnapping, rape and murder of Anna Mae Aquash. Bruce Ellison, Leonard Peltier's lawyer since the 1970s, was subpoenaed and invoked his Fifth Amendment rights against self-incrimination, refusing to testify. He also refused to testify, on the same grounds, at Looking Cloud's trial in 2004. During the trial, the federal prosecutor named Ellison as a co-conspirator in the Aquash case. Witnesses said that Ellison participated in interrogating Aquash about being an FBI informant on December 11, 1975, shortly before her murder.

Leonard Peltier is quoted in We, The People as saying, "I think it was around that December when I heard that Anna Mae was dead. I was in that jail over there in Canada right around whenever they exposed who she really was and what she died from, but I believe I didn't hear about it until December." Peltier had knowledge of Anna Mae Aquash's death in December, months before her body was found and her family was notified of her death.

In February 2004, Fritz Arlo Looking Cloud, an Oglala Sioux, was tried and convicted of the murder of Aquash. In Looking Cloud's trial, the prosecution argued that AIM's suspicion of Aquash stemmed from her having heard Peltier admit to the murders of the FBI agents. Darlene "Kamook" Nichols, former wife of the AIM leader Dennis Banks, testified that in late 1975, Peltier told of shooting the FBI agents. He was talking to a small group of AIM activists who were fugitives from law enforcement. They included Nichols, her sister Bernie Nichols (later Lafferty), Nichols' husband Dennis Banks, and Aquash, among several others. Nichols testified that Peltier said, "The motherfucker was begging for his life, but I shot him anyway." Bernie Nichols-Lafferty gave the same account of Peltier's statement. At the time, all were fleeing law enforcement after the Pine Ridge shootout.

Earlier in 1975, AIM member Douglass Durham had been revealed to be an undercover FBI agent and dismissed from the organization. AIM leaders were fearful of infiltration. Other witnesses have testified that, when Aquash was suspected of being an informant, Peltier interrogated her while holding a gun to her head. Peltier and David Hill were said to have had Aquash participate in bomb-making so that her fingerprints would be on the bombs. Prosecutors alleged in court documents that the trio planted these bombs at two power plants on the Pine Ridge Indian Reservation on Columbus Day 1975.

During the trial, Nichols acknowledged receiving $42,000 from the FBI in connection with her cooperation on the case. She said it was compensation for travel expenses to collect evidence and moving expenses to be farther from her ex-husband Dennis Banks, whom she feared because she had implicated him as a witness. Peltier has claimed that Kamook Nichols committed perjury with her testimony.

No investigation has been opened into the allegedly perjured testimony of Kamook Nichols, later married to a former FBI Chief Agent and living under the name Darlene Ecoffey. During the Looking Cloud trial, the Honorable Lawrence L. Piersol admitted the testimony with the following statement: "The requested testimony is hearsay, but I am going to admit it for a limited purpose only. This is a limiting instruction. It isn't admitted nor received for the truth of the matter stated. In other words, whether the rumor is true or not. It is simply received as to what the rumor was. So it is limited to what the rumor was, it is not admitted for the truth of the statement as to whether the rumor was true or not."

On June 26, 2007, the Supreme Court of British Columbia ordered the extradition of John Graham to the United States to stand trial for his alleged role in the murder of Aquash. He was eventually tried by the state of South Dakota in 2010. During Graham's trial, Darlene "Kamook" Ecoffey said Peltier told both her and Aquash that he had killed the FBI agents in 1975. Ecoffey testified under oath, "He (Peltier) held his hand like this", she said, pointing her index finger like a gun, "and he said 'that (expletive) was begging for his life but I shot him anyway.'" Graham was convicted of murdering Aquash and sentenced to life in prison.

=== Media interviews ===
In the documentary film Incident at Oglala (1992), AIM activist Robert Robideau said that the FBI agents had been shot by a 'Mr X'. When Peltier was interviewed about 'Mr X', he said he knew who the man was. Dino Butler, in a 1995 interview with E.K. Caldwell of News From Indian Country, contended that 'Mr X' was a creation of Peltier's supporters and had been named as the murderer in an attempt to gain Peltier's release from prison. In a 2001 interview with News From Indian Country, Bernie Lafferty said that she had witnessed Peltier's referring to his murder of one of the agents.

=== Presidential politics ===
Peltier was the candidate for the Peace and Freedom Party in the 2004 election for President of the United States. While numerous states have laws that prohibit prison inmates convicted of felonies from voting (Maine and Vermont are exceptions), the United States Constitution has no prohibition against felons being elected to federal offices, including President. The Peace and Freedom Party secured ballot status for Peltier only in California. His presidential candidacy received 27,607 votes, approximately 0.2% of the vote in that state.

In 2020, he ran as the vice-presidential running mate of Gloria La Riva on the ticket of the Party for Socialism and Liberation in the presidential campaign. He was forced to resign from the ticket for health reasons in early August 2020, and was replaced with Sunil Freeman.

=== Ruling on FBI documents ===
In a February 27, 2006, decision, U.S. District Judge William Skretny ruled that the FBI did not have to release five of 812 documents relating to Peltier and held at their Buffalo field office. He ruled that the particular documents were exempted on the grounds of "national security and FBI agent/informant protection". In his opinion, Judge Skretny wrote, "Plaintiff has not established the existence of bad faith or provided any evidence contradicting (the FBI's) claim that the release of these documents would endanger national security or would impair this country's relationship with a foreign government." In response, Michael Kuzma, a member of Peltier's defense team, said, "We're appealing. It's incredible that it took him 254 days to render a decision." Kuzma added, "The pages we were most intrigued about revolved around a teletype from Buffalo ... a three-page document that seems to indicate that a confidential source was being advised by the FBI not to engage in conduct that would compromise attorney-client privilege." Several of Peltier's supporters have taken legal action in an attempt to obtain more than 100,000 pages of documents from FBI field offices, claiming that the files should have been turned over at the time of his trial or following a Freedom of Information Act (FOIA) request filed soon after.

=== Victim of prison violence ===
On January 13, 2009, Peltier was beaten by inmates at the United States Penitentiary, Canaan, where he had been transferred from USP Lewisburg. He was sent back to Lewisburg, where he remained until the fall of 2011, when he was transferred to a federal penitentiary in Florida. According to High Country News in 2016: "Everywhere he's been, inmates have jumped and beaten him, likely with the collusion of guards."

=== Health issues ===
In March 2000, Peltier was confirmed to be suffering from a jaw infection, diabetes and a heart condition and was granted a transfer to the Federal Medical Center in Rochester, Minnesota for a period of time in order to be close to the Mayo Clinic.

Over the years in prison, Peltier's health has declined and he suffers from various ailments; by 2016 his diabetes had led to impaired vision [and] kidney issues. In April 2024, the International Indian Treaty Council (IITC) joined other groups appealing for his parole, citing his declining health: "Mr. Peltier is almost 80 years old and has several compounding health conditions, including kidney disease, diabetes, near-total blindness, and an untreated aortic aneurysm. He requires a wheelchair." COVID-19 further weakened Peltier, according to his clemency lawyer. Still in prison six months later, and after a recent hospitalization, allies renewed the call for his release, or at least a transfer to a Minnesota prison, where he could be closer to family and friends. They accused the Bureau of Prisons of medical neglect, and "cruel and unusual punishment”, violating the Eighth Amendment. They said Peltier was not getting a healthy diet or insulin treatment for his diabetes, and was unable to use his CPAP machine for sleep apnea treatment due to lack of an electrical outlet in his cell. At the time his sentence was commuted in January 2025, Peltier's sister Betty Ann informed the Minnesota Reformer that Peltier was using a walker.

Since his release, Peltier has undergone several eye surgeries. In September 2025, he said that he had lost 80% of his vision.

== In popular culture ==
=== Books ===
- Matthiessen, Peter (1983). In the Spirit of Crazy Horse. New York: Viking Press. ISBN 0-670-39702-4. OCLC 8475580.
- Sayer, John William (1997). Ghost Dancing the Law: The Wounded Knee Trials. Cambridge, MA: Harvard University Press. ISBN 978-0674354333.

=== Film and television ===
- Incident at Oglala: The Leonard Peltier Story (1992) – a documentary by Michael Apted about Peltier and narrated by Robert Redford. The film argues in favour of the assertion that the government's prosecution of Peltier was unjust and politically motivated.
- Thunderheart (1992) – a fictional film by Apted, partly based on Peltier's case but with no pretense to accuracy.
- Warrior, The Life of Leonard Peltier (1992) – a feature documentary directed by Suzie Baer about Peltier's life, the American Indian Movement, and his trial. The film argues that the government's prosecution of Peltier was unjust and motivated by the hugely profitable energy interests in the area.
- Yellowstone (2018) is a television series on the Paramount Network, created and written by Taylor Sheridan. In the first season, local tribal Chief Thomas Rainwater stands in his office in front of two different posters saying “Free Leonard Peltier” and “Pardon Leonard Peltier.”
- Free Leonard Peltier (2025) – a feature documentary by Jesse Short Bull and David France about Peltier's life, his role in the American Indian Movement, including the 1972 Trail of Broken Treaties event, and the effort to free him from prison. It premiered at the 2025 Sundance Film Festival.

=== Music ===
- Free Salamander Exhibit released their first album, "Undestroyed", on December 13, 2016. Its title track, composed by Nils Frykdahl, is a tribute to Peltier, and features lyrics drawn nearly verbatim from Peltier's book, Prison Writings: My Life Is My Sun Dance.
- Little Steven released the song "Leonard Peltier" on his 1989 album Revolution. The song discusses Peltier's case and the struggle of the Native Americans.
- Buffy Saint-Marie references Peltier in her 1992 track “Bury My Heart at Wounded Knee “, from her album “Coincidence and Likely Stories”. The Indigo Girls covered the song on their 1995 live album 1200 Curfews. The song mentions Peltier, saying, "the bullets don't match the gun".
- Sixteen Canadian artists contributed to Pine Ridge: An Open Letter to Allan Rock – Songs for Leonard Peltier, a benefit CD released in 1996 by What Magazine.
- Toad the Wet Sprocket reference Peltier, as well as the conflict at Pine Ridge and the Wounded Knee massacre, in their song "Crazy Life" on their album Coil (1997)
- Anal Cunt released the song "Laughing While Lennard Peltier Gets Raped In Prison" as a part of their album It Just Gets Worse.
- U2 recorded the song "Native Son" about Peltier. It was later reworked into their hit song "Vertigo" on their album, How to Dismantle an Atomic Bomb (2004). Five years later, "Native Son" was released on their digital album Unreleased and Rare (2009).
- "Bring Leonard Peltier Home in 2012" was a concert that took place at the Beacon Theatre in New York City. The concert featured Pete Seeger, Harry Belafonte, Jackson Browne, Common, Mos Def, Michael Moore, Danny Glover, Rubin "Hurricane" Carter, Bruce Cockburn, Margo Thunderbird, Silent Bear, Bill Miller, etc. all standing up for the immediate release of Leonard Peltier.
- Rage Against the Machine's 1994 "Freedom" video clip shows footage of the case and ends with a picture of Peltier in prison and the phrase "justice has not been done".
- "Sacrifice" from Contact from the Underworld of Redboy, the 1998 music recording by Robbie Robertson (formerly of the Band), features voice recordings of Peltier throughout the song, and surrounded with melody and vocals. The song ends with Peltier alone saying, "I've gone too far now to start backing down. I don't give up. Not 'til my people are free will I give up and if I have to sacrifice some more, then I sacrifice some more."
- French singer Renaud released a song called "Leonard's Song" in his 2006 album Rouge Sang. It supports Peltier and Native American rights, comparing in its lyrics the foundation of America to conducting an equivalent of the Holocaust against the Native American people.
- Alternative hip-hop trio The Goats mention Peltier several times on their 1992 debut album Tricks of the Shade: in a track entitled "Leonard Peltier in a Cage", and in the song "Do the Digs Dug" (which also mentions activist Annie Mae Aquash – lyrics referencing them are "Leonard Peltier Leonard Peltier Who da hell is that, why the f*** should ya care? In jail, in jail, in jail like a dealer F*** George Bush says my T-shirt squeeler Please oh please set Leonard P. free Cause ya wiped out his race like an ant colony Whatcha afraid of, Annie Mae Aquash? Found her lying in the ditch with no place for a watch")
- NAMA award winning artist Buggin Malone wrote multiple songs for peltier, including Dedication To Leonard Peltier in 1995, and released a album version in 2003, Malone then wrote another track for Peltier, Beat Goez On in 2004, then released Free Peltier in 2018, and plans to release a follow up to his 2004 track, with Beat Goez On pt II.
- Political hip-hop duo Dead Prez reference Peltier in their song "I Have A Dream, Too" from their 2004 album RBG: Revolutionary but Gangsta.
- In 2010, a hip-hop artists' compilation was released, Free Leonard Peltier: Hip Hop's Contribution to the Freedom Campaign, including music from Mama Wisdom, Immortal Technique, Rakaa of Dilated Peoples, 2Mex, Dee Skee, T-Kash, Buggin Malone, The Dime, Eseibio, Bicasso & DJ Fresh.
- Alternative hip-hop band Flobots, known for criticizing US politics and calls for action, referenced Peltier in their song "Same Thing" from their 2007 debut album Fight With Tools. The song mentions many people and topics, and the line that references Peltier also references Mumia Abu-Jamal; it reads "Free Mumia and Leonard Peltier".
- Ryan Bingham's song "Sunshine", is about Leonard Peltier.

=== Other ===
- In 2016, a statue of Peltier, based on a self portrait he made in prison, was created by artist Rigo 23 and installed on the grounds of American University in Washington, D.C.. After the university received complaints from the FBI Agents Association, the statue was removed and returned to the artist.
- It was reported by Joseph Corré that the last words of his father, Malcolm McLaren (1946–2010), were "Free Leonard Peltier".

== Publications ==
- Arden, Harvey (& Leonard Peltier). "Have You Thought of Leonard Peltier Lately?" HYT Publishing, 2004. ISBN 0-9754437-0-4.
- Peltier, Leonard. Prison Writings: My Life Is My Sun Dance. New York, 1999. ISBN 0-312-26380-5.

== See also ==
- List of memoirs of political prisoners
- List of longest prison sentences served
- Category:Native American activists

== Endnotes ==
Party political offices
Preceded by Marsha Feinland	Peace and Freedom nominee for President of the United States; 2004	Succeeded by Ralph Nader
