= Somalia affair =

Controversy about the Canadian military in Somalia

The Somalia affair was a 1993 Canadian military scandal, prompted by the beating to death of Shidane Arone, a Somali teenager, by two Canadian peacekeepers participating in humanitarian efforts in Somalia. The act was documented by photos, and brought to light internal problems in the Canadian Airborne Regiment. Military leadership were sharply rebuked after a CBC reporter received altered documents, leading to allegations of a cover-up. The Somalia affair tarnished Canada's international reputation in what was heralded as "the darkest era in the history of the Canadian military".

Eventually a public inquiry was called. Despite being cut short by the government, resulting in a public backlash, the Somalia Inquiry exposed problems in the Canadian Forces. The affair led to the disbanding of Canada's elite Canadian Airborne Regiment, greatly damaging the morale of the Canadian Forces. It also led to the immediate reduction of Canadian military spending by nearly 25% from the time of the killing to the inquiry.

== Background ==
In 1992, Somalia was in the middle of both famine and a civil war. The country was under domination by warlords, following the collapse of Siad Barre's government. Relief supplies were frequently stolen by armed gangs, who would hold the goods hostage for the loyalty of the population. As a result, the United Nations requested armed peacekeepers to assist the relief operations.

In the summer of 1992, Prime Minister Brian Mulroney committed Canada to United Nations Operation in Somalia I (UNOSOM I). Canada was being pressured by the United Nations to make this decision because in the past it had aggressively engaged in Yugoslavia in 1992 and had reached out through humanitarian evacuation programs like Operation Parasol to Balkan refugees later that year. The heightened media coverage on Somalia had also put more pressure on the Canadian government to mobilize a peacekeeping effort. Thanks to the Mulroney government's desire to improve conflict resolution mechanisms and for its natural interest in multilateralism and peacekeeping, Canada found the Somali Civil War to fit its foreign policy priorities. Mulroney was himself a "Pearsonian" and a multilateralist who had a great deal of confidence in the United Nations. Canadian diplomat Geoffrey Pearson argued that "effective multilateral arrangements provide a means to exert influence on major allies and powerful neighbours as well as help maintain peace". Mulroney's notion of new internationalism coupled with this notion of multilateralism would see intervention as a moral imperative in cases of intrastate disorder and large-scale human rights abuse. He commented that it would be ideal for the United Nations to become still more effective and more of an actor in international affairs.

Contributing to the US-led coalition and taking part in the UN force to Somalia seemed to align with Canadian foreign policy and fit Mulroney's vision for peacekeeping, as he was the "principal driver behind Canada's decision to commit itself to the Somalia mission".

Canada was one of the nations that agreed to send forces. Canadian forces, under the name Operation Deliverance, were sent to Somalia to participate in the American-led Operation Restore Hope. On 4 May 1993, the operation was to come under UN command and was renamed UNOSOM II.

It was decided that the Canadian Airborne Regiment (CAR) would be the contingent sent overseas. The Airborne had long been seen as the elite of the Canadian Forces, and in 1974 had performed admirably in combat operations in Cyprus as well as later peacekeeping tours there. However, General Beno informed General Lewis MacKenzie that training in the CAR was a "critical" problem due to Lieutenant Colonel Paul Morneault's leadership. It was debated whether to substitute another regiment, or cancel the mission entirely, but it was finally decided that to admit that the "elite" Canadian forces were incapable of handling a routine mission would have been a "national disgrace".

== Canadian Airborne Regiment ==
We promised them peacekeepers, and ... we sent them thugs.

— Rex Murphy

Only recently deemed a light infantry battalion, some leaders expressed concern that the Somalia mission did not fit the Regiment's mandate or abilities. The Airborne consisted of multiple sub-units drawn from each of Canada's regular infantry regiments. Later, LCol. Kenward suggested that the line regiments had offloaded some of their "bad apples" into the CAR. LCol. Morneault, the commanding officer of the CAR, declared the "rogue commando" unit unfit for service abroad and sought to have it remain in Canada. Instead, he was relieved of his command and replaced by Lieutenant Colonel Carol Mathieu.

There had been recurring discipline problems, and an ongoing investigation into their base of CFB Petawawa as a hotbed of white supremacist activity in 2 Commando. This included the adoption of the confederate flag as the commando's barracks-room decoration. The flag had initially been presented as a gift from American soldiers, and gradually became an unofficial symbol, although successive commanding officers had tried to ban its usage.

Footage depicting racist actions of Cpl. McKay and Pte. Brocklebank was later brought forward by Scott Taylor, who hoped to expose systemic problems in the military and exonerate his friend Kyle Brown. In the video, McKay utters racial slurs, and pre-deployment photographs showed him wearing a Hitler shirt in front of a swastika. A video taken by CAR soldiers shows Brocklebank making racist and violent remarks.

Mike Abel, the only Canadian to die in the Somali operation, was allegedly a member of the Ku Klux Klan; colleagues disputed the evidence that racist literature had been found in his belongings, and asserted that it just floated around the camp and everybody read it.

== Airborne in Somalia ==
The CAR was deployed in December 1992 as part of the Unified Task Force. It was accompanied by a helicopter squadron and a squadron of the Royal Canadian Dragoons. Although they were planning to deploy to the comparatively quiet port city of Bosaso, four days after arriving in Somalia commander Serge Labbé informed them that consultation with the Americans meant they would be moving to the southern town of Belet Huen, considered one of the more difficult areas to patrol.

One of the Dragoons' first tasks, under command of Sgt. Donald Hobbs, was rebuilding a bridge that had been destroyed on the Chinese Highway linking Belet Huen and Matabaan. The loss of the bridge meant the only way around was through a partially cleared minefield.

On January 2, Canadian forces seized an AK-47 from a local Somali who returned the following day with a machete to threaten the troops to give him back his gun; a warning shot was fired and ricocheted, hitting him in the foot. He left, refusing medical care. Also in January 1993, Lt.-Col. Carol Mathieu gave verbal orders allowing Canadian soldiers to shoot at thieves under certain conditions. On January 29, suspected bandits were found congregating on a roadway and as Canadian forces approached them, they began to flee. Warning shots were fired into the air to halt them, leading to a retaliatory shot from a Somali, and returned fire from the Canadian troops.

On February 10, they fired on a crowd approaching a Red Cross distribution centre.

On February 17, a demonstration of 50–300 Somalis crowded together on the Bailey bridge over the Shebelle River, and when some began throwing rocks at the Canadian Forces, soldiers fired two shotgun blasts, killing one Somali and injuring two others. A later investigation cleared the shooters of any wrongdoing; noting they were justified in their response.

By the end of the mission, no Canadian troops had been killed or wounded by enemy forces, the sole casualties arising when a soldier shot himself in the arm while cleaning his sidearm on January 11, and when MCpl. Tony Smith negligently discharged his rifle, fatally wounding Cpl. Abel on May 3, 1993.

== March 4 killing ==
On March 4, two unarmed Somalis were shot in the back, one fatally, after Canadian troops laid an ambush to try to catch petty thieves stealing from the military base in Belet Huen. This followed from a decision by Captain Michel Rainville to re-label petty theft by Somalis as "sabotage", a distinction that meant deadly force could be used to defend the base. Rainville relied on the argument that a fuel pump used to service American MedEvac helicopters had been stolen deliberately to hinder the military effort, while critics pointed out that any saboteurs likely would have ignited the thousands of gallons of fuel surrounding it.

After Warrant Officer Marsh discovered the missing fuel pump, he suggested installing a large searchlight atop a tower to deter thieves. He was dismissed by Rainville, who suggested that the idea was not to deter thieves, but to catch them in the act using night vision. Rainville ordered that food and water be placed in a trailer at the south end of the compound, visible to Somalis walking past on the nearby road. Some soldiers alleged this constituted "bait", but Rainville later defended himself saying it had been to distinguish between thieves and saboteurs to prevent shooting thieves.

Rainville enlisted Cpl. Ben Klick of the PPCLI to lie in a truckbed at night, awaiting potential "saboteurs" with a C3A1 rifle. From his position, he watched two Somalis, Ahmed Arush and Abdi Hunde Bei Sabrie, approach the food and water. Fifteen minutes after first noticing the pair, Ahmed and Abdi began to run from the base in fear they had been noticed; Rainville yelled at them to "stop", and called to Sgt. Plante, Cpl. King and Cpl. Favasoli to "get them". Plante fired with his shotgun, while King fired with his C7; Plante's shot wounded Sabrie, who fell to the ground, while Arush kept running back towards the roadway. Cpl Leclerc and MCpl Countway both shot at him as he ran, while Cpl. Klick refrained, noting that the man presented no risk to Canadian forces. Arush fell to the ground, hit by one of the two men's shots. He struggled to stand up, but both men fired again, killing him.

It was noted that Sabrie had been carrying a ceremonial dagger in his clothing. When the unit was ordered to bring the body of Arush to the same position as Sabrie, the soldiers radioed back that they could not move the body without it falling apart. So the body of Arush was loaded into a body bag and placed inside a Bison personnel carrier. There, medical technician MCpl Petersen re-opened the bag and took Polaroid photographs for an unknown reason, some suggest to document the shooting, others suggest as a "trophy". The photos showed gaping wounds in Arush's neck and the side of his face, with his skull twisted out of shape by the force of the gunblast. His intestines protruded from his stomach, and his right eye was missing.

An Air Force flight surgeon, Major Barry Armstrong, examined the body and judged the death "suspicious", suggesting that Arush had been lying prone on the ground when he was killed. He also noted that the amount of omentum which had passed through the first wounds suggested the 29-year-old Arush had been breathing for at least 2 or 3 minutes before the final gunshots to his head were fired.

After the examination, Arush's body was then used for medical practice for soldiers, demonstrating how to stab a tracheotomy into a wounded man's throat to allow him to breathe, and then used to demonstrate the proper preparation of a body for transportation. The body was then returned to the body bag, and sent into the local hospital, where Dr. Xelen released it to Arush's family the same evening. For the next two weeks, Colonel Allan Wells approached Vice-Admiral Larry Murray to send military police to Somalia to investigate the shooting, but was rebuffed. When the Chief of Defence Staff, Admiral John Rogers Anderson, visited the military base on March 8–9, he visited the wounded Somali recovering in the Canadian hospital.

The event would not have been reported, except that Member of Parliament John Brewin read out an anonymous letter he had received from a soldier about witnessing the "execution" of a Somali civilian on March 4.

At the subsequent inquiry, Klick defended Rainville, heavily criticising his commanding officer, Lieutenant-Colonel Carol Mathieu, and testified that American Special Forces Chief Warrant Officer Jackson had interrogated the wounded Somali who confessed to being a saboteur, although this contradicted all other evidence, including the statements of the American soldier who never mentioned any interrogation. In 1994, the Ministry of Defence engaged in an undercover attempt to discredit Armstrong's findings, phoning Allan Thompson of the Toronto Star and offering to leak to him the pathology report by James Ferris conducted two months after the killing, which found the decomposing body showed none of the signs Armstrong had suggested. Thompson took his evidence of a preconceived "leak" from the Ministry to the subsequent inquiry, where they added weight to Armstrong's findings. While his commanding officer, Lieutenant-Colonel Carol Mathieu described Armstrong as bordering on insanity at the inquiry, the only evidence he produced was that he liked to climb onto the roof of the hospital at night in Somalia and watch the stars.

== Torture and killing of Shidane Arone ==
On March 16, 1993, Captain Michael Sox found 16-year-old Shidane Abukar Arone hiding in a portable toilet in an abandoned American base across from the Canadian base in Belet Huen. Believing he was attempting to sneak into the Canadian base to steal supplies, Sox turned him over to another soldier, who led the teenager to a bunker being used to house munitions. Arone protested, saying he had simply been trying to find a lost child.

At 21:00, Sgt. Mark Boland replaced Master Corporal Clayton Matchee as guard of the prisoner, and ordered his foot bindings be removed and replaced with fetters, as the ropes were too tight. Warrant Officer Murphy took the opportunity to kick Arone "savagely", which was later taken to be implicit permission to abuse the prisoner. At this time, Matchee began his abuse of Arone by removing the captive's clothing and using it to crudely waterboard the youth until Boland objected, and Matchee left the bunker.

At 22:00, Trooper Kyle Brown took over guard duty, and brought Matchee back with him. Brown punched Arone in the jaw, and was told by Boland, "I don't care what you do, just don't kill the guy", to which Brown replied that he wanted to "kill this fucker". Boland then joined Matchee and Matt McKay for beers in the mess hall, where Matchee spoke about what he wanted to do to Arone, and suggested he might put out cigarette butts on his feet. McKay suggested that Matchee might use a ration pack or phone book to beat the youth, as it would not leave any traces.

Matchee and Brown, both members of 2 Commando, then proceeded to beat Arone. Matchee used a ration pack to beat the youth, as well as a broomstick, and raped the teenager with it. Brown participated in the abuse, but was primarily an observer and took sixteen "trophy photos" of the beating, including one of Matchee forcing Arone's mouth open with a baton, and one of himself holding Pte. David Brocklebank's loaded pistol to Arone's head. At about 23:20, Master Cpl. Giasson entered the bunker. Matchee showed him the semi-conscious and bleeding Arone, and boasted that "in Canada we cannot do that, and here they let us do it".

Estimates have ranged that 15–80 other soldiers could hear or observe the beating, but did not intervene. Corporal MacDonald, acting as duty signaller that night, was asked by Sgt. Major Mills about "a long dragged out howl" heard from the vicinity of the bunker, but MacDonald refused to stop playing with his Game Boy to investigate. Later, Matchee came by to borrow a cigarette from MacDonald and mentioned that "now the black man would fear the Indian as he did the white man" (Matchee was a Saskatchewan Cree), and MacDonald went outside to check on Arone's status. He saw Matchee hitting him in the face with the baton, and reported that the prisoner was "getting a good shit-kicking" to Sgt. Perry Gresty, before retiring to bed for the night.

Arone fell unconscious after several hours of beatings, after shouting "Canada! Canada! Canada!" as his last words. When Brown mentioned the event to Sergeant J. K. Hillier, the non-commissioned member noted there "would be trouble" if the prisoner died, and went to check on the youth who he found had no pulse, and base medics confirmed that the boy was dead. It was later discovered that Arone had burn marks on his penis.

== Response ==
Jim Day, a reporter with the Pembroke Observer local newspaper from the regiment's hometown, was on the base at the time and was the first to report that Canadian soldiers were being held pending an investigation into the death of a Somali citizen.

The Canadian military seems to have blind confidence in mefloquine, even though it carries warnings that those with judgment jobs, like neurosurgeons or airline pilots, shouldn't use it. But it is apparently safe for young men with loaded weapons. Does that make sense?

— Peter Worthington

The debate over what led to the events came at a politically sensitive time in Canada, as the Minister of National Defence Kim Campbell was in the midst of a Progressive Conservative Party of Canada leadership campaign to become prime minister. Matters were made worse when Campbell tried to dismiss the allegations of racism in the Canadian military by referring to it as "youthful folly" and suggesting that it was commonplace. Criticism also focused on the fact that it took five weeks to order a high-level investigation into the events in Somalia.

Some, including Member of Parliament John Cummins, quickly pointed out that three of the four men facing the most serious charges had been given experimental injections of Lariam, a brand-name of mefloquine, to test its effects on combatting malaria in a controlled study group. The drug was known to cause paranoia, lack of judgment, neurosis and other mental side effects, and some have suggested it bore some responsibility for the soldiers' actions. Dr. Michele Brill-Edwards had actually resigned in protest from Health Canada over her belief that the drug could produce "dangerous psychiatric reactions" in the soldiers.

== Legal proceedings ==
Once again, history repeats itself; only the lower ranks have been made to account for the marked failures of their leaders

— Somalia Inquiry Report, page 1910

A death in custody automatically triggered an investigation, and two days later Matchee and Brown were arrested and charged and National Defence Headquarters was advised.

Matchee later attempted to hang himself in his cell; the attempt failed but caused massive brain damage, making him unfit to stand trial. The following individuals were charged in the inquiry:

Name	Charge	Result
MCpl. Clayton Matchee	2nd-degree murder; Torture	Unfit to stand trial following suicide attempt. Matchee tried to hang himself after being arrested and suffered serious brain damage. Charges against him were eventually dropped in September 2008 as his diminished mental capacity meant that he no longer posed a threat to the public.
Pte. Kyle Brown	2nd-degree murder; Torture	Convicted of manslaughter and torture. Sentenced to 5 years' imprisonment. Dismissed from the army in disgrace. Appeals were also dismissed. Released on parole one year after conviction.
Sgt. Mark Adam Boland	Negligent performance of duties; Torture	Pleaded guilty to negligent performance of duty for his role in the death of Shidane Arone, and not guilty to torture. Convicted. Sentenced to 90 days' detention. Deemed "willfully blind" to the beating, also demoted to private. Sentence increased to 1 year's imprisonment after prosecution appealed sentence, with dismissal from the Canadian Forces.
Major Anthony Seward	Unlawfully causing bodily harm; Negligent performance of duties	Found guilty of negligent performance of duty for giving instructions to abuse detainees, and sentenced to a severe reprimand. Acquitted of unlawfully causing bodily harm. Prosecution appealed for a tougher sentence. Court Martial Appeal Court subsequently imposed a term of 3 months' imprisonment. Defence's appeal was declined. Seward was also dismissed from the Canadian Forces.
Capt. Michael Sox	Unlawfully causing bodily harm; Negligent performance of duties; Act to the prejudice of good order and discipline	Convicted of negligent performance of duty. Acquitted of unlawfully causing bodily harm. A stay of proceedings was entered on the charge of an act to the prejudice of good order and discipline. Sox was also demoted to lieutenant, and received a severe reprimand. Appeals by both sides were dismissed.
LCol. Joseph Carol Mathieu	Negligent performance of duties	Acquitted. The prosecution appealed the verdict, and the Appeal Court ordered a new trial. Mathieu was also acquitted in the second trial.
Capt. Michel Rainville	Unlawfully causing bodily harm; Negligent performance of duties	Acquitted and later released from the CF
Sgt. Perry Gresty	Negligent performance of duties	Acquitted.
Pte. David Brocklebank	Torture; Negligent performance of duties	Acquitted on both charges. Prosecution's appeal was dismissed.

== McAuliffe's request for documents ==
In September 1995, CBC reporter Michael McAuliffe requested access to 68 Response to Query forms to supplement his earlier informal gleanings about the Canadian military operation, but the documents were altered before being released to him to make them agree with the information he had been given earlier. In addition, invented financial charges were tagged onto his request, stating that it had taken 413 man-hours and subsequently would cost McAuliffe $4,080, although the documents were in fact readily available.

While giving McAuliffe misinformation informally was not illegal, it was a crime under s. 67.1 of the Access to Information Act for the government to release forged documents in response to an Access to Information request. The question quickly emerged of whether Chief of Defence Staff Jean Boyle had known about the altering, and if he bore responsibility for it even if he were ignorant of his underlings' doings. On September 5, 1995, a clerk at the NDHQ was discovered collecting Somalia-related documents for a burn bag to be destroyed. Boyle later concurred that there had been documents proving attempts to cover up details of both the March 4 and March 16 killings.

== Somalia Inquiry ==
Also mitigating, to a certain extent, is the fact that these individuals must be viewed as products of a system that placed great store in the "can do" attitude. The reflex to say "yes sir" rather than to question the appropriateness of a command or policy obviously runs against the grain of free and open discussion, but it is ingrained in military discipline and culture. However, leaders properly exercising command responsibility must recognise and assert not only their right, but their duty, to advise against improper actions, for failing to do so means that professionalism is lost.

— Commission of Inquiry, 1997

The public outcry against Arone's death didn't occur until November 1994, when a publication ban was lifted against the 16 photographs Brown had taken of the torture session and they were widely published in Canadian media.

After the 1993 Canadian federal election, the new government of Jean Chrétien's Liberal Party initiated a highly visible Somalia Inquiry in 1994 under Federal Court Judge Gilles Létourneau. Officially known as the Somalia Commission of Inquiry, its hearings were broadcast daily in both languages, nationally.

As the inquiry unfolded, home videos of initiation rites in the CAR's French-speaking commando found their way into the media. The new Minister of National Defence David Collenette argued that the videos were disgusting, demeaning and racist. With the continued accumulation of such politically damaging visibility, the Minister of National Defence advised Governor General Roméo LeBlanc to disband the Canadian Airborne Regiment in 1995.

The Chief of the Defence Staff General John de Chastelain, who had not supported the minister's disbandment order of the Airborne, resigned under a cloud. His successor, Air Force General Jean Boyle was forced to resign only a few months after accepting the role when, in a gesture uncharacteristic of military tradition, he blamed his subordinates for previous wrongdoing under his command.

On April 8, 1996, Boyle called a halt to all normal duties and announced the entire Canadian military would begin searching for documents relating to Somalia.

The inquiry ran until 1997 when it was cut short by the government in the months before the 1997 election. The government was critical of the direction of the inquiry, claiming that it was far exceeding its mandate. Art Eggleton, a member of Cabinet who would go on to become minister of national defence after the 1997 election, suggested that the events had happened four years earlier, and it was time to "move on".

Indeed, the conduct of the new government after the Somalia affair and the search for documents now absorbed much of the inquiry's attention, as reflected in its report. The inquiry had run long over its allotted timeframe and budget. The decision to end the inquiry received visible media attention and may have contributed to the defeat of the new Defence Minister Doug Young in the 1997 election. The inquiry was never able to examine top level governmental decision-making, nor did it actually examine the alleged events in Somalia.

The final report of the inquiry was a striking attack on the procedures, support and leadership of the Canadian Forces and the Ministry of Defence. Many of the top officers in the Canadian Forces were excoriated, including three separate Chiefs of the Defence Staff. The CAR had been rushed into a war zone with inadequate preparation or legal support. Enquiry observer retired Brigadier-General Dan Loomis noted that the operation had changed, in December 1992, "from a peacekeeping operation, where arms are used only in self-defence, to one where arms could be used proactively to achieve politico-military objectives ... In short the Canadian Forces were being put on active service and sent to war (as defined by Chapter 7 of the UN Charter)." Its deployment into "war" had never been debated in parliament and indeed the Canadian public had been led to believe by its government that the CAR was on a "peacekeeping" mission. After the events the leaders of the Canadian Forces had been far more concerned with self-preservation than in trying to find the truth. The inquiry report singled out Major-General Lewis MacKenzie as a major exception, as he took full responsibility for any errors he made.

== Aftermath ==
The affair had a number of long-lasting effects. While it is difficult to separate the effects of the affair on Canadian Forces morale from those of the concurrent defence spending cut, it did exacerbate feelings of distrust towards the media and politicians among many CF members.

At the same time, public trust in the Canadian Forces suffered and recruitment became more difficult. Public revulsion provided support for the sharp cuts to military spending introduced by the government. Many of the report's comments, along with the sustained media criticism of the military, led to the imposition of policies designed to ensure nothing similar to the Somalia Affair could happen again. Since the events in Somalia, Canada focused on implementing more educational requirements (including ethics, tactical, and strategic planning), oversight processes, and setting new standards and policies for senior officers.

In 1999, judge J. Douglas Cunningham dismissed an appeal for financial compensation by Arone's parents Abubakar Arone Rage and Dahabo Omar Samow, ruling that their use of a litigation guardian, Abdullahi Godah Barre, was inconsistent with the legal requirement, and they should have traveled to Canada to launch the suit themselves.

Brown later co-operated on a book in which it was suggested he had been made the scapegoat for the incident, unlike the officers who had not intervened.

Soldiers of other countries also faced charges of misconduct; American soldiers were involved in the deaths of three young boys in separate incidents, Pakistani troops were accused of a number of civilian deaths, and Belgian soldiers took photographs of themselves allegedly torturing a Somali to death.

Other long-term effects on the Forces included the adoption of sensitivity training, including SHARP (Standard for Harassment and Racism Prevention) training, which became mandatory for every single member of the Forces, and was accompanied by a declaration of "zero tolerance" on racism and harassment of any kind, including hazing.

Some have suggested that Royal Canadian Mounted Police (RCMP) Commissioner Joseph Philip Robert Murray was slated to be replaced, until Boyle was removed – making it difficult for the Prime Minister to simultaneously replace the head of the armed forces and the head of the federal police.

== Peacekeeping and humanitarian intervention in the wake of the Somalia affair ==
The notion of peacekeeping seems to be deeply embedded in Canadian culture and a distinguishing feature that Canadians feel sets their foreign policy apart from the likes of the United States. The Somalia commission wrote in 1997 that "Canada's foreign policy with respect to peacekeeping has been consistent since Canadians embraced peacekeeping in the late 1950s". Since the Suez Crisis, Canadian foreign policy has fit a peacekeeping rubric. Americans, however, were seen to fight wars, but Canadians pictured themselves as working for peace. Canada never had a reputation for starting wars but instead was seen to come to the aid of war-torn countries.

The Somalia affair came as such as surprise to the Canadian public as no one would have thought Canada's golden reputation for international peacekeeping could be tarnished. The Somalia Affair and the ensuing commission of inquiry has become the subject of intense criticism and has given rise to a great deal of comparative theoretical work on humanitarian intervention and peacekeeping. In her book Sherene Razack asks if it was just a case of "a few bad apples" in the Canadian forces, or if the Somalia affair speaks to a larger issue on the complex nature of peacekeeping and humanitarian intervention. Thomas Weiss comments that the failures in Somalia have led to this concept of "Somalia syndrome": "multilateral interventions to thwart starvation, genocide, the forced movement of peoples, and massive violations of fundamental rights are no longer politically or operationally feasible". Peacekeepers are more likely to be involved in peace enforcement in more warlike conditions as unlike traditional peacekeeping; there is not always consent from all the conflicting parties. Such was the case in Somalia as the men were hypervigilant with a sense of fear and frustration as they were trained for combat yet charged with providing humanitarian aid. Faced with this strong Somali opposition and resentment and yet being responsible for providing aid meant that Canadian peacekeepers "increasingly could not find meaning in their activities". A "Somalia syndrome" sentiment lingered in the international community after the failures in the war-torn country. Weiss, however, reminds us not to take Somalia out of context or draw upon the wrong lessons leading to isolationism or eschewing necessary humanitarian intervention. The debacle in Somalia would be so paralyzing that it would lead to an unwillingness from the international community to respond to future problems, like the Rwandan genocide. The United States under the Clinton administration would need to rethink its foreign policies and the rest of the world just did not want another Somalia affair.

The Somalia affair thus had a direct impact on how the international community made foreign policy with a crippling "Somalia syndrome" that led to the sense of caution in intervening in the Rwanda genocide and in the Balkans.

== See also ==
- Bystander effect
- Command responsibility
- List of Canadian military operations
- List of Canadian peacekeeping missions
- Operation Deliverance
