= Martine Pagé =

Canadian screenwriter

Martine Pagé is a Canadian screenwriter from Quebec. She is most noted as co-writer with Mélanie Charbonneau of the 2025 film Out Standing (Seule au front), for which they won the Canadian Screen Award for Best Adapted Screenplay at the 14th Canadian Screen Awards in 2026.

Originally from Quebec City, she studied screenwriting and film production at the Université Laval and San Francisco State University. Her first screenplay, Taking the Plunge (À vos marques... party!), was directed by Frédéric D'Amours and released in 2007, Followed by the sequel Taking the Plunge 2 (À vos marques... party! 2) in 2009. She subsequently worked principally in television, as a writer for the series Max et Livia, Contre-offre, Lac-Noir, Ils sont parmi nous and Le Dernier des monstres.
