= Rigo 23 =

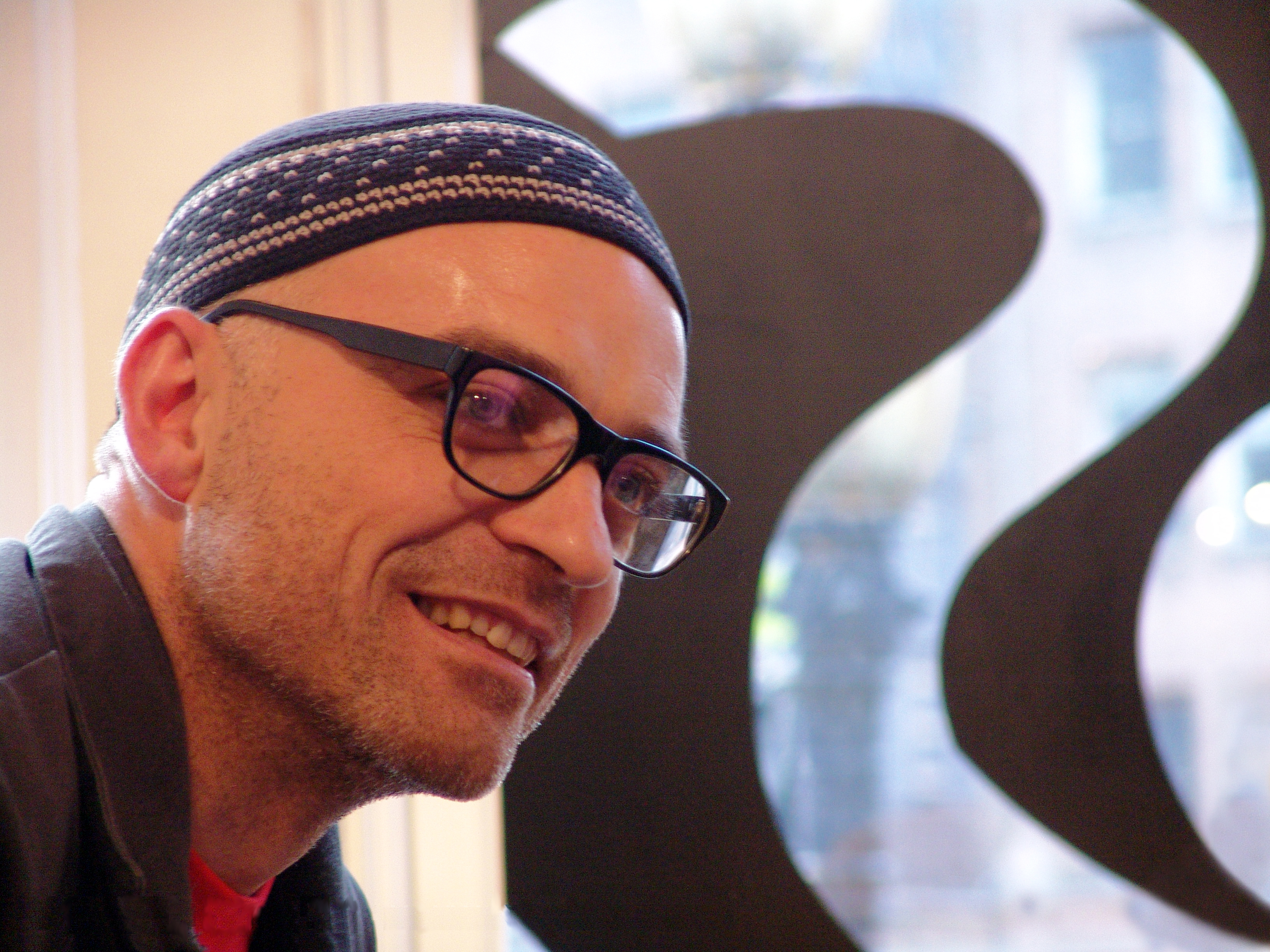
- Rigo 23, in 2007.
- Born: Ricardo Gouveia; 1966 (age 59–60); Madeira, Portugal
- Other names: Rigo, Rigo 92, Rigo 93, Rigo 94, Rigo 95, Rigo 96, Rigo 97, Rigo 98, Rigo 99
- Education: San Francisco Art Institute, Stanford University
- Awards: SECA Art Award (1998)

Rigo 23 (born Ricardo Gouveia, 1966) is a Portuguese-born visual artist. He is known in the San Francisco community for having painted a number of large, graphic "sign" murals including: One Tree next to the U.S. Route 101 on-ramp at 10th and Bryant Street, Innercity Home on a large public housing structure, Sky/Ground on a tall abandoned building at 3rd and Mission Street, and Extinct over a Shell gas station. He resides in Los Angeles, California.

== Early life and education ==
Rigo was born in 1966 and raised on the island of Madeira in Portugal. In his youth he joined Center for Cultural Action (CACF) in Funchal and connected with older artists.

Rigo arrived in San Francisco in 1985, using the name Rigo 85. He earned a BFA degree from San Francisco Art Institute in 1991, and an MFA degree from Stanford University in 1997.

From 1984 until 2002, Rigo used the last two digits of the current year as part of his name, finally settling upon "23" in 2003.

== Career ==
=== San Francisco murals ===
Rigo is one of the founding members of Clarion Alley Mural Project collective in 1992 and is still an active member, as of 2017. He is considered by some art critics and curators to be part of the first generation of the San Francisco Mission School art movement. Many of Rigo's 20+ murals are located in the South of Market (SOMA) neighborhood in San Francisco.

The first of a series of San Francisco murals, the 40-foot-tall (12 m) shield-shaped street sign mural "Innercity Home" (1995) is located in the Tenderloin neighborhood and can be seen from a distance when entering the city on the freeway.

The San Francisco pop art mural "One Tree" (1995) was one of his more iconic works; it was located near a freeway ramp at 10th and Bryant streets and featured a mural of a street sign pointing to a single tree which grew nearby. In 2012, additional trees were planted near the mural, which had previously featured only a single tree, and by 2017, the mural was deconstructed, cut and moved to point to the freeway ramp.

=== Political art ===
Rigo's artwork has highlighted world politics and political prisoners, from the Black Panthers and the Angola Three to Mumia Abu-Jamal, whose conviction for the murder of a policeman is contested, and the American Indian Movement's Leonard Peltier. Rigo created a controversial statue of Peltier that was removed from the grounds of the American University in January 2017.

In 2005, he created a statue based on the 1968 Olympics Black Power salute titled Victory Salute, a 22-foot-tall (6.7 m) monument of two men: Tommie Smith and John Carlos. In the 1968 Olympic Games in Mexico City, these men each raised a black-gloved fist for human rights. Their simple gesture of the hand is considered as one of the most controversial statements of political and social activism in Olympic history. Victory Salute is a monument of that moment which was specifically built on the San Jose State University campus because Smith and Carlos were both student-athletes at the college.

=== Other work ===
Rigo was an occasional professor at the San Francisco Art Institute (now defunct). He has designed several installations as part of the 2006 Liverpool Biennial.

His work is in the collection of di Rosa, San Francisco Museum of Modern Art (SFMOMA), and the Berardo Collection Museum.

== Awards ==
This is a list of select awards.

- 1991 - Chauncey McKeever Award, San Francisco Art Institute, San Francisco, California
- 1994 - WESTF/NEA Regional Fellowship for Visual Arts
- 1996 - One Tree, Best Public Art Project of the Year, San Francisco Bay Guardian, San Francisco, California
- 1997 - Stoli, San Francisco Arts Achievement Award Secession Gallery, Visual Art Residency Fellowship Award, Taiwan
- 1998 - SECA Art Award, San Francisco Museum of Modern Art (SFMOMA), San Francisco, California
- 1999 - Biennal Award (under the name "Rigo 99"), The Louis Comfort Tiffany Foundation, New York City, New York
- 2006 - Eureka Fellowship, Fleishhacker Foundation, California
- 2007 - Howard Fellowship, Brown University, Providence, Rhode Island
- Creative Work Fund, Walter and Elise Haas Fund with Luggage Store Gallery, San Francisco, California
