= Mélanie Charbonneau =

Canadian film director and screenwriter

Mélanie Charbonneau is a Canadian film director and screenwriter from Quebec, whose debut feature film Fabulous (Fabuleuses) premiered in 2019.

Prior to Fabulous, she directed the short films Single (Seules) and Lunar-Orbit Rendezvous, with the latter film receiving a Prix Iris nomination for Best Live Action Short Film at the 21st Quebec Cinema Awards.

Her second feature film, Out Standing, entered production in 2024, and premiered in the Discovery program at the 2025 Toronto International Film Festival. Her third feature film, The Furies (Les Furies), opened commercially in November 2025.

Charbonneau and Martine Pagé won the Canadian Screen Award for Best Adapted Screenplay at the 14th Canadian Screen Awards in 2026, for Out Standing.
