= Norman Mitchell (disambiguation) =

Norman Mitchell (1918–2001) was an English television, stage and film actor

Norman Mitchell may also refer to

- Norman Mitchell (sportsman) (1900–1973), Australian cricketer and footballer
- Norm Mitchell (born 1949), Australian rules footballer
- Norman Mitchell (rugby league), rugby league footballer of the 1950s
- Norman Mitchell-Innes (1914–2006), known as Mandy Mitchell-Innes, English cricketer
- Lieutenant Colonel Coulson Norman Mitchell (1889–1978), Canadian soldier and recipient of the Victoria Cross
- Norman Mitchell Lake, a lake in central Manitoba, named after Lieutenant Colonel Coulson Norman Mitchell
