= Canadian Airborne Regiment =

- Régiment aéroporté canadien (French)
- Cap badge
- Active: 8 April 1968 – 1 September 1995
- Country: Canada
- Branch: Force Mobile Command
- Type: Airborne forces
- Role: Parachute infantry
- Size: Approx. 600 members
- Part of: Royal Canadian Infantry Corps
- Garrison/HQ: CFB Griesbach (1968–1977); CFB Petawawa (1977–1995)
- Motto: Ex cœlis (Latin for 'from the sky')
- Colors: Maroon beret
- March: "The Longest Day"
- Battle honours: Normandy Landing; Dives Crossing; The Rhine; Monte Camino; Monte La Difensa–Monte Remetanea; Monte Majo; Advance to the Tiber; Anzio; Rome; Southern France; Ardennes; North-West Europe, 1944–45

The Canadian Airborne Regiment (French: Régiment aéroporté canadien) was a Canadian Forces formation created on April 8, 1968. It was not an administrative regiment in the commonly accepted Commonwealth of Nations sense, but rather a tactical formation manned from other regiments and branches. It was disbanded in 1995 after the Somalia affair.

== Origin and organizational aspects ==
=== The concept of the Airborne ===
The main proponent of the Airborne was General Jean Victor Allard who, as commander of the Army (i.e. Mobile Command) and then Chief of Defence Staff, created it between 1965 and 1968 as a large rapid-reaction, light mobile force, suitable for overseas brigade-size missions. It was designed as a flexible short-term immediate response available to the government when it accepted an overseas reinforcement or intervention mission within NATO, or elsewhere. It would be replaced in a brigade's proposed mission area, after no more than a few weeks, once the main body of a heavier brigade was mobilized and transported with its fighting vehicles and support to the area. (See General Allard's memoirs, Chap. 12.)

Over time, and a succession of chiefs of defence, the Airborne remained an object of conflicting concepts of operations, military structure and linguistic identity. Originally designed as a quick-reaction immediate-response force that could, if absolutely necessary, use parachutes, it was quickly transformed into a highly specialized parachute force, to be used for special parachute missions in the regular order of battle. (See Allard's memoirs.) This, in turn, created controversy since there was no accepted requirement for such a Canadian Forces capability in operational plans, other than the rather pedestrian task of jumping into remote locations in the Canadian Arctic including Baffin Island, Moose Factory and other locations.

The original concept of the Airborne envisaged a rotation of young infantry soldiers and officers through its units, serving a maximum of two years. It was to be an essential and exciting posting for all young infantry leaders prior to their promotion to sergeant or captain in their own regiment. Allard wrote: "this regiment would not reflect the identity of a Victorian-era regiment because its members would serve in it for only a short period (Chap 12)." However, under Allard's successors, the Airborne became instead another separate regiment, specializing in parachuting, and keeping its members for as long as possible. It adopted all the symbols of a line regiment, including badges, colours, and history (creating a historical link with Canadian war-time parachute battalions). In particular, it sought to replace the identity of its members from Canada's line regiments with that of the Airborne. This aborted the original operational purpose of the Airborne and, significantly, planted the seeds of an ongoing conflict of identity and loyalty within the Canadian infantry family. Allard wrote that "those who took this route showed an absolute ignorance of the requirement for quick-reaction in today's world."

Captain W.D "Bud" Nelson CD was the first quartermaster of the Airborne, receiving commendations and a trophy for the most jumps. Captain Nelson was also the first to don and model the new unification uniform in 1968.

=== Location ===
On General Allard's retirement, the unit was established at CFB Griesbach in Edmonton, Alberta, in 1968. This was a large Air Transport Command base. The prairie weather is ideal for specialized parachute training, and Edmonton is the "gateway to the North". But the location in western Canada was disputed by some for operational reasons in that Canada's rapidly declining troop strength was consequently heavily skewed to that part of the continent where neither its population nor its NATO commitments justified. There was a full brigade in the West, plus the Airborne. In central and eastern Canada, there were only four battalions of infantry.

The Edmonton location also created linguistic problems. The Airborne's French-speaking elements had initially been left at CFB Valcartier in Quebec, but they have also moved to Alberta in 1970. There, it became difficult to keep them up to strength, particularly as many married leaders refused to make their career in an environment unsuitable for their families.

Finally, in the face of recruiting and retention problems, as well as operational concerns, the Airborne was moved to CFB Petawawa in Ontario, where it remained until it was disbanded.

In 1970 a mechanized infantry battalion was added to the regiment and was named 3rd Canadian Mechanized Commando. This unit was an element of the 4th Canadian Mechanized Brigade and was stationed in CFB Baden, Germany. Although it was part of the regiment it did not have a parachute role. It was disbanded in 1977.

== Organization, size, and identity ==
The Airborne Regiment also suffered from frequent reorganizations. Initially conceived as a small brigade, its lack of resources forced it from the start to become a rather large tactical "regiment" with two infantry "Commandos", one French-speaking (1er Commando aéroporté) and the other English-speaking ( 2nd Airborne Commando), The Commandos where larger in size ,than a tradition Infantry Company with 150 personnel each. The Airborne Regiment also had integrated Combat Support; a Airbourne Headquarters and Signal Squadron,1st Airbourne Battery RCHA (Artillery),1st Airbourne Field Squadron RCE (Engineers), and 1st Airbourne Service Company ( Logistics and Supply)..

A tug-of-war thus started between advocates of an exclusive "airborne" identity versus Canada's other infantry regiments, whose support was needed to promote a flow of soldiers and, in particular, leaders. An uneasy compromise was reached after 10 years, in 1979, when the Airborne was reorganized into three infantry commandos each identified with, and supported from, one of Canada's three line infantry regiments. Over time, this support was generally excellent, and the commandos became a legitimate part of their regimental family of origin. There were, however, occasions when the quality of that support was questioned (see Somalia Affair).

The resources provided for the Airborne continued to dwindle. In 1977, when the regiment moved to CFB Petawawa from Edmonton, it became the core of the Airborne Battle Group within the new Special Service Force, an all-arms light brigade group, tasked with the rapid reinforcement of NATO forces in Norway or Denmark. Its airborne artillery and engineer elements were reassigned to their parent units of the brigade. The total peacetime strength of the regiment was down to 750 all ranks.

In 1992, the Canadian Airborne Regiment was reduced to battalion size (601 members). Its commandos lost their status as distinct administrative units commanded by Commanding Officers and became companies of the Airborne, commanded by an Officer Commanding, albeit maintaining their links with their regiments of origin.

In the 1970s a mechanized infantry battalion had been created within Canada's downsized brigade in Germany and named 3 Canadian Mechanized Commando; its dress, colours and other symbols were those of the Canadian Airborne Regiment. This designation was a convenient mechanism for manning it from Canada's two English-speaking infantry regiments, allowing both to maintain NATO expertise. However, its role was strictly that of a mechanized infantry battalion and had nothing to do with the parachute operations of the regiment in Canada.

The Canadian Airborne Regiment was ordered to be disbanded by the Minister of National Defence after the Somalia Affair on September 1, 1995. This move occurred during a period marked by severe defence budget cuts and internal reorganization. Although General John de Chastelain, Chief of Defence Staff, publicly disagreed with the minister on this decision, it is likely that the lack of an obvious role in the force structure outlined in the 1994 Defence White Paper, as well as a record of controversy during its peace-time history, allowed much of National Defence Headquarters leadership to tacitly concur with the minister's reaction to the Somalia Affair.

In 2026, the 3rd Canadian Light Infantry Regiment was stood up, combining the three light infantry battalions formerly contained in three separate geographic divisions. While it does not explicitly carry on the lineage of the Canadian Airborne Regiment, it combined all parachute-capable Regular Force units into a single regiment for the first time since the CAR was stood down. It is also the only operational formation in the Canadian Army designated a regiment.

== Operational service ==
=== In Canada ===
The Airborne Regiment deployed multiple times domestically: once in response to the October Crisis in Quebec in 1970, then in 1976 to provide counter-terrorism support during the Montreal Olympics, and finally in 1987 to assist local emergency services in search and rescue operations and later recovery operations following the Edmonton Tornado.

The regiment was also placed on three-hour standby as a quick reaction force during the final day of the Oka Crisis during Operation Salon, but they were not called in. Prior to the standby order, the regiment had conducted training for six weeks for a possible deployment to the crisis after receiving authorization from Lieutenant-General Kent Foster.

=== Cyprus ===
The Canadian Airborne Regiment's first overseas tour was to Cyprus in April 1974, viewed at the time as an ordinary peace-keeping task. The contingent was structured around its 1^{er} Commando and its field (engineer) squadron.

However, in July 1974, an attempt by agents of the dictatorship then ruling Greece to seize power and unite the island with Greece was met by military intervention from Turkey, which invaded Cyprus on July 20. In a two-stage offensive, Turkish troops took control of 38% of the island. Many Greek Cypriots fled south while many Turkish Cypriots fled north.

In the first phase, the 1^{er} Commando consolidated its positions on the Green Line in Nicosia, while the rest of the regiment deployed rapidly from its base in Edmonton. On 14 August the second wave of the Turkish invasion began and both sides began to target UN positions. After the ceasefire, the Turks and Greeks began building defensive positions. Meanwhile, the Airborne troops, with British support, took command of the international airport to deny further troop movement, then intervened with patrols to prevent escalation of the conflict, patrolling the buffer zone between the lines, assisting with the delivery of relief supplies to refugees and organizing exchanges of PoWs. The Airborne lost two killed (Paras Berger and Perron of the Royal 22^{e} Régiment) and 30 wounded, while also earning several significant decorations.

The Airborne continued its peacekeeping rotations to Cyprus, returning to the island in 1981, 1985 (3 Commando under 2nd Regiment Royal Canadian Horse Artillery) and 1986 (less 3 Commando).

=== Somalia 1992 ===
Since the Airborne was designed to deploy rapidly into "hot" situations, its 1, 2, and 3 Commando units, with attached support—a total of 900 soldiers—were sent to Somalia late in 1992. The operation was called Operation Deliverance and formed part of the overall U.S.-led Operation Restore Hope.

The unit had recently been reduced to battalion size and was still in the throes of reorganization as well as the severe cut-backs by the government at the time. The reductions were instigated by the torture and murder of Somali teenager Shidane Arone carried out by CAR soldiers, which became known as the Somalia affair. In the wake of the Somalia affair a number of videos became public showing members of the regiment participating in brutal hazing rituals, and displaying white supremacist symbols. The unit was subsequently disbanded.

== Lineage of The Canadian Airborne Regiment ==
The Canadian Airborne Regiment traces its origin to the Second World War–era 1st Canadian Parachute Battalion (1 Can Para) and the First Special Service Force (FSSF) which was administratively known as the 2nd Canadian Parachute Battalion. The regiment bears battle honours on its Regimental Colours from both units, including Normandy Landing, Dives Crossing and Rhine in the case of the former, and Monte Camino, Monte Majo, Monte La Difensa/Monte La Remetanea, Anzio and Rome in the case of the latter.

=== 1st Canadian Parachute Battalion ===
The 1st Canadian Parachute Battalion was Canada's original airborne unit, formed on July 1, 1942. Volunteers completed jump training in England then underwent four months of training at Fort Benning, Georgia, and the Parachute Training Wing at Shilo, Manitoba. Part airman, part commando, and part engineer, the paras underwent dangerously realistic exercises to learn demolition and fieldcraft in overcoming obstacles such as barbed wire, bridges, and pillboxes. By March, Canada had its elite battalion, which returned to England to join the 6th Airborne Division as a unit of the Britain's 3rd Parachute Brigade.

The battalion's service in the European theatre included the airborne invasion on D-Day, a short reinforcement stint in Belgium and the Netherlands, the airborne crossing of the Rhine and the subsequent advance to Wismar where they met the Russians.

With victory in Europe and the Pacific War ending in August, the 1st Canadian Parachute Battalion was disbanded. The battalion was perpetuated in the infantry commandos of The Canadian Airborne Regiment, whose colours carried the battle honours: Normandy Landing, Dives Crossing, The Rhine, and North-west Europe 1944–1945.

=== First Special Service Force ===
The Canadian Airborne Regiment also drew much inspiration from the history of the First Special Service Force. The regiment bore the FSSF battle honours Monte Camino, Monte Majo, Monte la Difensa–Monte la Remetanea, Anzio and Rome on its regimental colour. As well the unconventional nature of the First Special Service Force, similar to the British SAS and the current U.S. Army Special Forces and elsewhere, was not replicated in the more conventional role of the Canadian Airborne Regiment. Nevertheless, its accomplishments served as a model for many members of the new "Airborne".

The First Special Service Force was a unique joint formation of Canadian and American troops assigned to perform sabotage operations in Europe in World War II. Simply named "special forces" to conceal its "commando" or "ranger" purpose, this unit later gained fame as the "Devil's Brigade". The Canadians were designated the "2nd Canadian Parachute Battalion".

Members were handpicked and sent to Helena, Montana, United States, for special training. The Canadians wore American uniforms and equivalent ranks to eliminate any questions of command among the troops. Their work-up took place in three phases, with extensive physical training throughout the program. The first phase included parachute training, small unit tactics and weapons handling—all officers and ranks were required to master the full range of infantry weapons from pistols and carbines to bazookas and flame throwers. Next came explosives handling and demolition techniques, then a final phase consisted of skiing, rock climbing, adapting to cold weather, and operation of the Weasel combat vehicle. Exercises in amphibious landings and beach assaults were added later.

The first deployment of FSSF to the Aleutian island of Kiska disappointed the troops when it was found that the Japanese forces expected there had already evacuated, but the exercise was considered good experience. The force was next sent to Italy, where German forces entrenched in two mountains were inflicting heavy casualties on the 5th US Army. The first regiment, 600 men, scaled a 1,000-foot (300 m) cliff by night to surprise the enemy position on Monte La Difensa. The battle was won in just two hours (the events of this battle were famously portrayed in the 1968 film The Devil's Brigade). The force remained for three days, packing in supplies for defensive positions and fighting frostbite, then moved on to the second mountain, which was soon overtaken. In the end, FSSF suffered 511 casualties including 73 dead and 116 exhaustion cases. The commander, Colonel Robert Frederick, was wounded twice himself.

FSSF saw continued action throughout the Mediterranean, at Monte Sammucro, Radicosa, and Anzio. For the final advance on Rome, 1SSF was given the honour of being the lead force in the assault and became the first Allied unit to enter the "Eternal City". Their success later continued in southern France and then at the Franco-Italian border. Often misused as line troops, the force suffered continuously high casualties until it was finally withdrawn from combat.

On the December 5, 1944, in the town of Menton in southern France, the First Special Service Force was disbanded. Its battle honours included Monte Camino, Monte la Difensa–Monte la Remetanea, Monte Majo, Anzio, Rome, Advance to the Tiber, Italy 1943–44, Southern France, and North-West Europe 1944. The Canadians rejoined their home units and the Americans were assigned to either airborne units or the newly formed 474th Infantry Regiment. Frederick became the youngest major-general ever in the US Army, at the age of 37, and took command of the 45th Division.

=== Post-war parachute units ===
In 1947, the Canadian Special Air Service Company was created with former members of the 1 Can Para and FSSF at its core. It was commanded by Major Guy D'Artois, a Canadian veteran of the Royal 22^{e} Régiment, First Special Service Force and "F" Section Special Operations Executive.

However, in 1950, Canada was once again mobilizing, this time for Korea and NATO Europe. Each of Canada's three traditional Regular Force regiments (The Royal Canadian Regiment, Princess Patricia's Canadian Light Infantry and Royal 22^{e} Régiment) expanded to three battalions. A brigade commitment, consisting of airborne and air-delivered troops to defend Canada's North, was undertaken. Battalions of this Brigade were all airborne. It was structured, over the next 20 years, into the "Mobile Strike Force" and subsequently reduced in size to the "Defence of Canada Force". This parachute role, was switched from one battalion to another within each of Canada's regular infantry regiments, as they rotated to and from Korea and, subsequently, to Europe. The brigade's elements remained garrisoned in their respective bases across the country and seldom exercised as a complete brigade.

Each of the battalions was trained to fly into Canada's North, and seize an airhead or location that could be developed for airlanded operations. When the role changed from one battalion to another, within each regiment, a small nucleus of specialized instructor-planners and riggers generally transferred over to the new battalion; however, the rest of the unit quickly undertook the requisite parachutist qualifications, generally with much enthusiasm; the requirement that parachutists be "volunteers" was rarely an issue in converting these tightly-knit infantry units. There were also airborne artillery, signals, medics, and engineer elements in the brigade.

In 1958 the "Mobile Strike Force" was restructured as "The Defence of Canada Force", resulting in a reduction to one parachute company in each battalion. At this time the airborne artillery was disbanded and other support elements reduced. The parachute component in each battalion consisted of battalion tactical headquarters, and a large company group (i.e. four platoons) with support detachments of mortars, machine guns, pioneers and reconnaissance detachments. A large reserve of trained parachutists was built up in the other companies.

In 1968, many of the officers and soldiers of the "Defence of Canada Force" provided the nucleus of expertise for the new Canadian Airborne Regiment, being created at CFB Griesbach, Edmonton, Alberta, with its French-speaking element at CFB Valcartier, Quebec.

== Battle honours ==
The Canadian Airborne Regiment was granted the perpetuation of both the 1st Canadian Parachute Battalion, CIC; and the 1st Canadian Special Service Battalion, CIC (was also known as the 2nd Canadian Parachute Battalion: the Canadian component of the First Special Service Force aka The Devil's Brigade); and in turn was granted the following battle honours:

- Normandy Landing
- Dives Crossing
- The Rhine
- Monte Camino
- Monte La Difensa–Monte Remetanea
- Monte Majo
- Advance to the Tiber
- Anzio
- Rome
- Southern France
- Ardennes
- North-West Europe, 1944–45

== Legacy ==
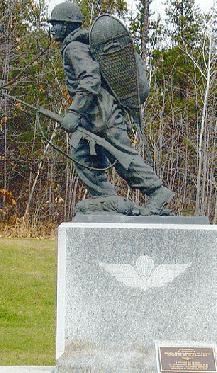
Into Action (1988) by Andre Gauthier

- Into Action (1988) by André Gauthier marks the 20th anniversary of the Canadian Airborne Regiment; the sculpture at the entrance to Canadian Forces Base Petawawa's Airborne Forces Museum depicts a Canadian paratrooper in winter combat gear.

== See also ==
- Operation Deliverance

== Media ==
- The Canadian Airborne Regiment in Somalia: A socio-cultural inquiry: a study by Donna Winslow (1997)
- What Manner of Man: Darnell Bass and the Canadian Airborne Regiment by James Ogle (Jan 2006)
