= CSAS =

CSAS may refer to:

- Canadian Special Air Service Company, an elite post-war parachute unit.
- Center for the Study of the American South
- Central Sleep Apnea Syndrome
- Combined Statistical Area, a statistical unit used by the United States Census and other offices.
- Coal Smoke Abatement Society, a predecessor to Environmental Protection UK.
- Community Safety Accreditation Scheme
- Chattanooga School for the Arts & Sciences
- Czechoslovak Academy of Sciences
- Command Stability Augmentation System, a fly-by-wire feature of the Panavia Tornado.
