= National Field of Honour =

Canadian military cemetery

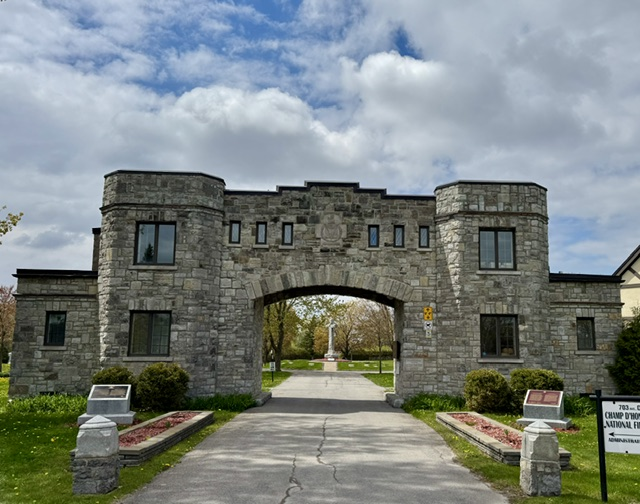
- The cemetery gates.
- Interactive map of National Field of Honour

Details
- Established: 1930
- Location: Pointe-Claire, Quebec
- Country: Canada
- Coordinates: 45°26′39″N 73°50′16″W
- Type: Military Veterans
- Owned by: Last Post Fund National Field of Honour
- No. of interments: 22,000+
- Website: https://champdhonneurnational.ca/home
- Find a Grave: National Field of Honour

National Historic Site of Canada
- Official name: Last Post Fund National Field of Honour
- Designated: 2007

The National Field of Honour (French: Champ d’honneur national) is a military cemetery for Canadian and Allied Veterans and eligible dependents. It is in Pointe-Claire, Quebec, Canada.

== Description and General Information ==
Established in 1930 and enlarged several times, the National Field of Honour was designated a National Historic Site of Canada in 2007. The cemetery is located between Pointe-Claire and Beaconsfield, Quebec on the north side of the Quebec Autoroute 20 at Exit 48. It is managed by the Last Post Fund and has a small administration staff and groundskeeping team. Volunteer programs support educational visits and commemorative services.

Twice a year, the National Field of Honour conducts large-scale public commemorative services: one in the second half of May and another for Remembrance Day on November 11. Over the past decades, the grounds have been enriched with artifacts. With more than 22,000 burials, the site is the largest military cemetery in Canada.

As a branch of the Last Post Fund, the cemetery benefits from the Governor General of Canada as the Last Post's patron-in-chief.

== History ==
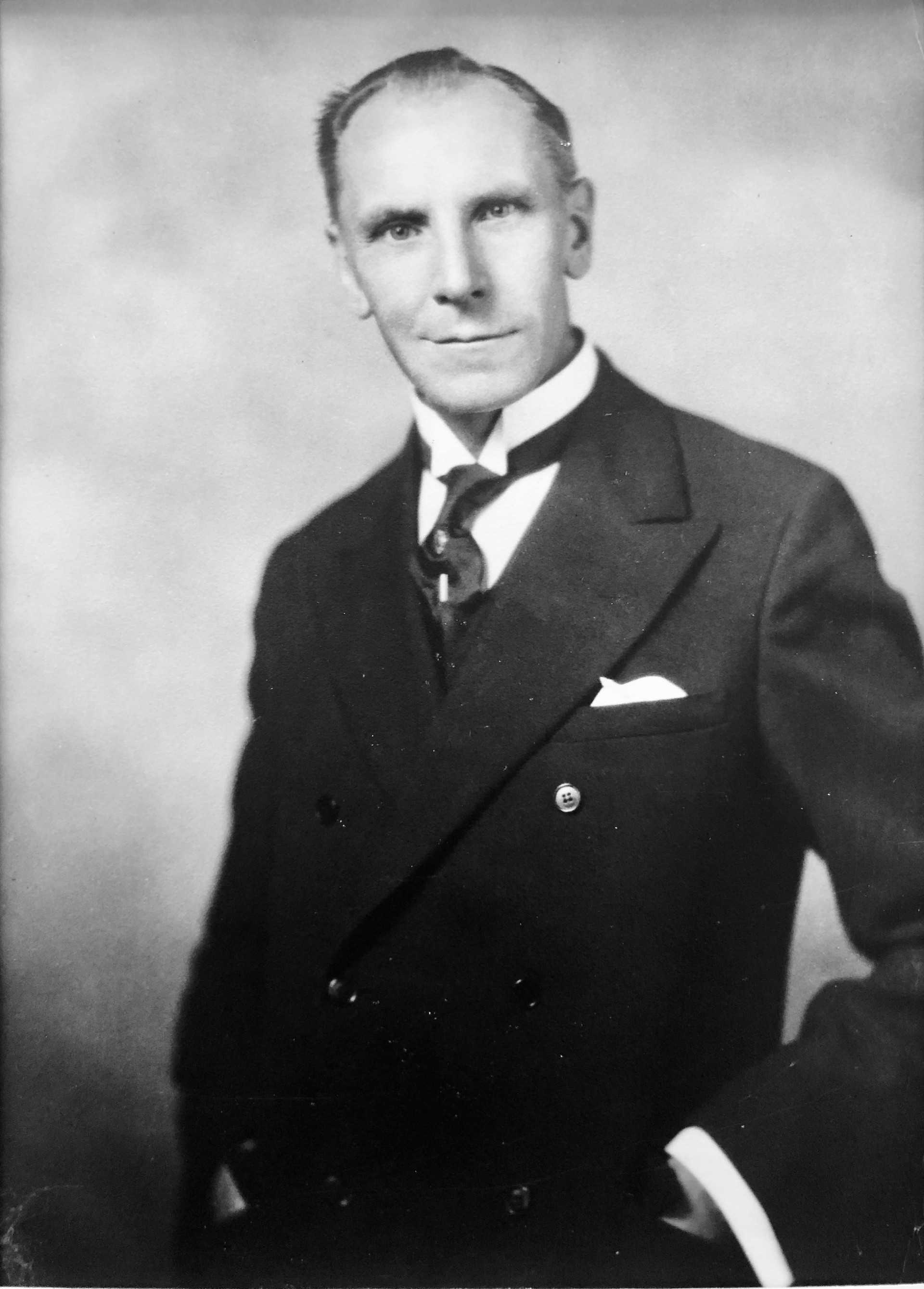
Arthur Harold Douglas Hair, founder of the Last Post Fund, c. 1915

The National Field of Honour was established and is maintained by the Last Post Fund, a charitable organization founded by Arthur Hair in 1909.

The Last Post Fund's mission is to ensure that no Veteran is denied a dignified funeral and burial, as well as a military gravestone, due to insufficient funds at time of death. Its primary mandate is to deliver the Veterans Affairs Canada Funeral and Burial Program which provides funeral, burial and grave marking benefits for eligible Canadian and Allied Veterans. In addition to delivering the Funeral and Burial Program, the Last Post Fund National Field of Honour supports other initiatives designed to honour the memory of Canadian and Allied Veterans.

The National Field of Honour in Pointe-Claire was consecrated on September 21, 1930. As of 2025, more than 22,000 burials and interments have taken place here. The National Field of Honour is distinct among Canadian military cemeteries in that all headstones are laid flush with the ground. All Veterans, whether they were a General or a Private, lie beside each other as equals. There are 16 war graves from the Second World War, which are registered by the Commonwealth War Graves Commission. The number of graves from the major overseas wars is small in Canada because fallen soldiers were usually buried in overseas military cemeteries, as the bodies could not be transported long distances at that time.

The National Field of Honour is freely open to the public, the office is operated from Monday to Friday, 8:30am to 4pm.

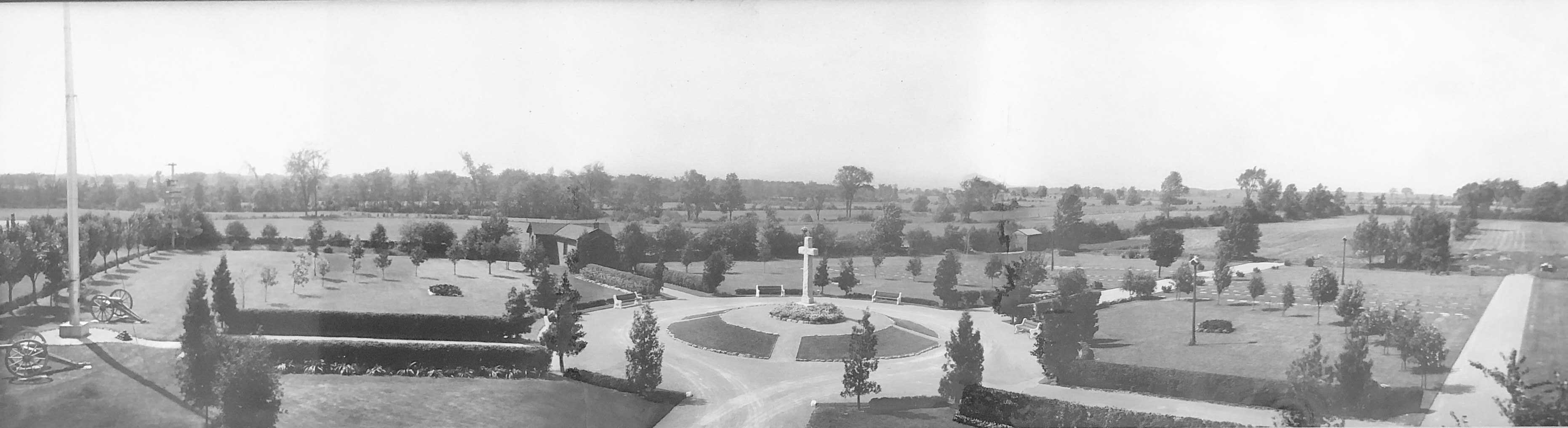
The cemetery landscape design in 1938 seen from the roof of the Gate of Remembrance

== Cemetery Design ==
The plans for the National Field of Honour Cemetery follow the Art Deco style that was popular during the era of the cemetery’s creation. The original plan features a central paved path intersected by three landscaped circles, each positioned at an equal distance from the others. Each circle supports a large monument. From each circle, transverse paths connect to two side paths, forming the centre of a cross-shaped pattern. The streets in the cemetery are named to honour distinguished Canadian Veterans or military events.

The grave fields between the paths are covered with grass, in which the graves are embedded flush with the ground. A hedge of cedar trees borders the property, solitary, informally placed deciduous and evergreen trees provide vertical focal points while trees planted in a formal manner line the main path.

Later extensions to the west, along with additional monuments and buildings, leave the initial concept intact but depart from the original symmetrical design. The Cemetery added a 12-unit granite Columbarium in 2005. In 2025, the Last Post Fund with support of the Estate of Doug Ferguson established a small water garden in memory of Canadian soldiers buried in the Brookwood Cemetery in Surrey, England.

== Memorials, Monuments and Artifacts ==
=== The Gate of Remembrance ===
The entrance to the National Field of Honour is through the Gate of Remembrance, a medieval-style arch flanked by twin towers inspired by Tudor Revival architecture. The Gate was built in 1937 at a cost of $11,850, of which $5,000 was donated by the city of Pointe-Claire. Construction took 13 weeks to complete. The Gate of Remembrance serves as a memorial to all those who made the supreme sacrifice for their country. Over the years, it has served a number of purposes: it was once the home of the groundskeeper, later housed administrative offices, and for a time contained the Last Post Fund archives. The south tower houses an ecumenical chapel, which was added in 1973 with funds donated by former LPF director Bruce Brown. The architect of the Gate of Remembrance was Harold J. Doran, and the contractor was Francis King. Harold J. Doran is also recognized as the architect of Benny Farm in Notre-Dame-de-Grâce, a social housing project for Second World War veterans built between 1946 and 1947. Right behind the tower is a pair of cannons from 1860. The company Sir W.G. Armstrong Whitworth & Co., of Newcastle upon Tyne, England, produced the cannons around 1860, likely for the British Army. The cannons bear the serial numbers 1457 and 1467. According to the plaques on the cannons, one was reconditioned in 1956 and the other in 1988.

=== Arthur Hair Reception Center ===
This building to the north of the Gate of Remembrance is named after the founder of the Last Post Fund. It is used as the cemetery’s office. Before information became accessible online, it served as a reception and interpretive centre where visitors learned about the Field and the backgrounds of buried veterans.

=== Currie Circle ===
The Currie Circle is dedicated to the memory of Sir Arthur Currie. At its centre stands the Cross of Sacrifice. Sir Arthur commanded the Canadian Corps during the First World War, and later served as principal and vice-chancellor of McGill University as well as president of the Last Post Fund from 1924 to 1932. He died in 1933 and is buried at Mount Royal Cemetery. On June 30, 1947, Last Post Fund Founder Arthur Hair became the first person to be interred in the grounds surrounding the Cross of Sacrifice, which are reserved for the burial of Last Post Fund officials. This Plot is known as the Directors' Circle.

=== The Flagstaff ===
A 22-metre (73) foot metal flagstaff was a gift from the Canadian Steamship Line. It was erected by the Dominion Bridge Company in 1930. Due to its deteriorated state, the flagstaff was replaced in 2022.

=== The Commonwealth War Graves Memorial (The Quebec Memorial) ===
This Commonwealth War Graves Memorial consists of two granite blocks. It was erected to commemorate Canadian service personnel from both World Wars who were buried in the province of Quebec but whose graves could no longer be marked or maintained. For this reason, it is also known as the Quebec Memorial. The memorial lists the names of 49 individuals from the First World War and 43 from the Second World War.

The Commonwealth War Graves Commission was established in England by royal charter in 1917. Founded by Major General Sir Fabian Ware, it marks and maintains the graves of Commonwealth service personnel who were killed in action or died from other causes during the two World Wars. The Commission also builds memorials to those who have no known grave and maintains records and registers, including records of civil war dead.

The Last Post Fund and the Commonwealth War Graves Commission collaborated to stop the recycling of veterans’ graves by cemeteries. Thanks to the advocacy of the LPF and the CWGC, this practice is no longer permitted in Canada.

=== Air Force Memorial ===
The displayed two-blade metal propeller belonged likely to a Cessna 172 Skyhawk. This type of plane was commonly used for military parachute training. The propeller is placed on a granite plinth, in memory of Veterans of the Canadian and Allied Air Forces. Flight Lieutenant Howard Ripstein donated this monument in 2003. He was a former director of the Quebec Branch of the Last Post Fund.

=== Army Memorial ===
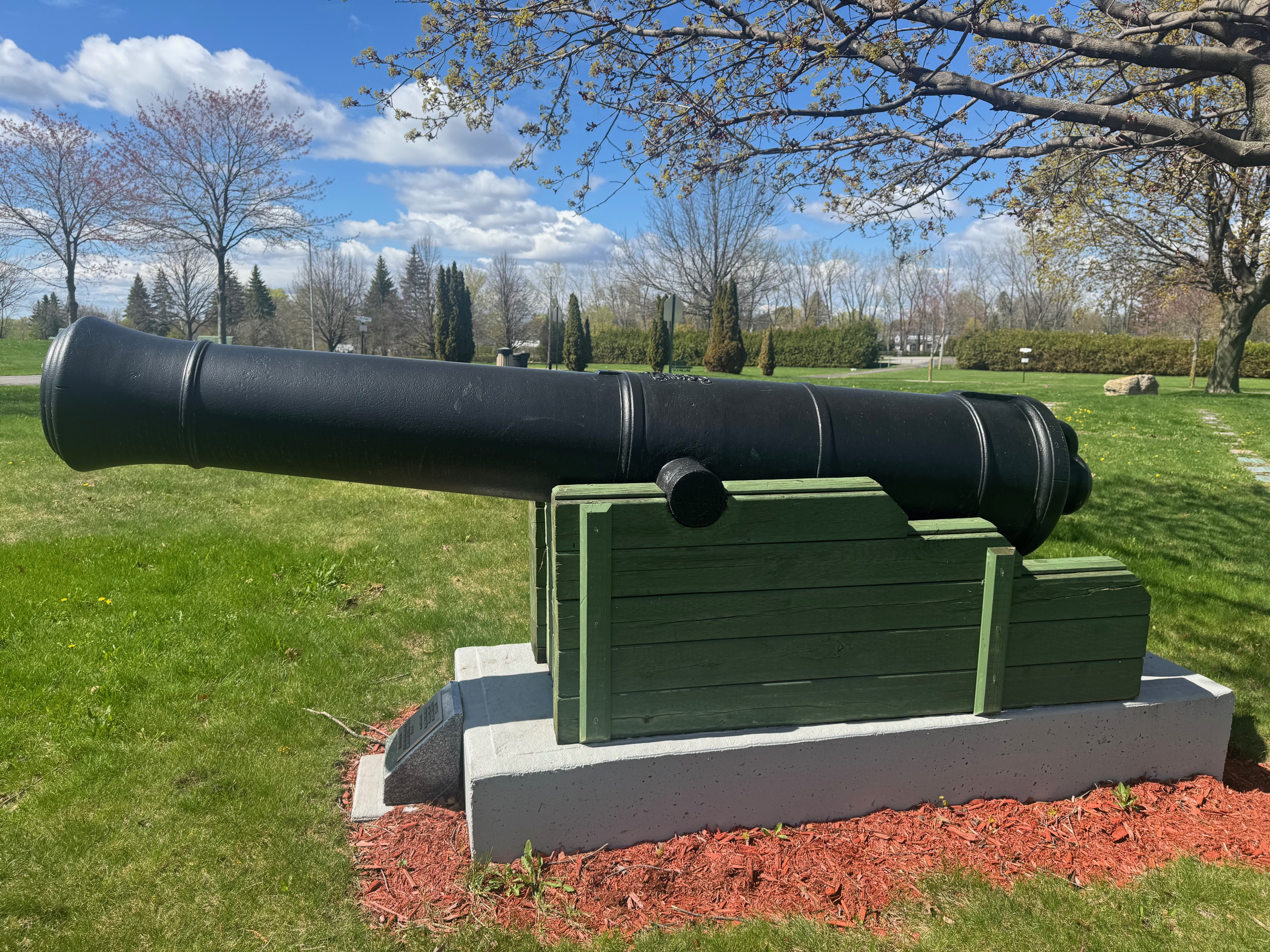
Army Memorial with a cannon from 1887

In 1999, the Canadian Army donated a six-inch cannon in memory of Canadian and Allied soldiers who died in wartime service. The cannon bears the date 1887 and carries the Royal Arms of George III. It was cast in Montreal by E. E. Gilbert and Sons.

=== Navy Memorial ===
An anchor from 1954 serves as a memorial dedicated to sailors of the Royal Canadian Navy and Allied sailors. The Canadian Forces’ Longue-Pointe Garrison donated the balanced stockless anchor in 1998. The anchor was manufactured in Sorel, Quebec, and weighs 30 cwt (hundredweight), or approximately 1,500 kg, a size commonly used on frigates and corvettes.

=== Memorial for Veterans of the Canadian Army ===
A heavy 32-pound-calibre cannon dating from 1887 was produced by E.E. Gilbert & Sons in Montreal. It bears the crest of King George III on top of the barrel. The cannon weighs 64 cwt (approximately 3,250 kg) and is mounted on its original wooden carriage, which has been restored and modified.

This circle is named after Lieutenant-Colonel Charles-Michel de Salaberry (1778–1829), the distinguished commander of Canadian troops who halted the advance of invading American forces during the Battle of the Châteauguay on October 26, 1813, during the War of 1812. A French-Canadian nobleman, he served in the British Army in Canada and commanded troops in Lower Canada at the time.

=== De Salaberry Circle and Veterans' Memorial ===
The Last Post Fund named this circle in memory of Lieutenant-Colonel Charles de Salaberry, who prevented the invasion of Quebec by American forces during the Battle of the Chateauguay. At the centre of the circle stands the Veterans’ Memorial, a large monolith bearing a plaque dedicated to the memory of all Canadian servicemen and servicewomen who died in the First World War, the Second World War, and the Korean War.

=== D'Urban Circle ===
This plot contains the oldest graves in the National Field of Honour, belonging to soldiers who fought in campaigns in Canada and around the world, dating back to the 18th century. These include the Fenian Raids, the Napoleonic Wars — including the Battle of Waterloo — and the War of 1812. These veterans were originally interred at the Papineau Military Cemetery in downtown Montreal, which was used by British forces from 1814 to 1869.

The Papineau Cemetery was located along the route now occupied by the access road to the Jacques Cartier Bridge. Prior to the bridge’s construction in 1944, the Last Post Fund relocated approximately 1,797 burials, together with the existing headstones, to the National Field of Honour. Due to the poor condition of the records and the deterioration of the headstones, not all dates could be deciphered.

At the centre of this circle stands an obelisk dedicated to Sir Benjamin d’Urban, commander of British forces in North America, who died in Montreal, Canada in 1849. This general and colonial administrator is remembered for his frontier policy as governor of the Cape Colony (now in South Africa, where the city of Durban is named in his honour). As a soldier, d’Urban began his service in 1793 and fought in the Napoleonic Wars, where he gained distinction in the Peninsular War as Quartermaster General.

The obelisk is the National Field of Honour’s largest monument. It was erected by Benjamin d'Urban's former comrades to mark his grave at the Papineau Military Cemetery and was moved to Pointe-Claire when the Papineau cemetery was relocated in 1944.

=== Jewish Section and Monument ===
This section of the National Field of Honour was consecrated in accordance with the tenets of the Jewish faith to permit Jewish veterans to be buried here. A stone monument is dedicated to the memory of Canadian and Allied Jewish veterans who made the ultimate sacrifice.

=== The Peace Circle ===
The Peace Circle was dedicated in 1997, after Canada changed its designation of veterans to include those who had served on duty around the world in the service of peace. The artist Jean Bernard, a Second World War Royal Canadian Air Force veteran, designed the Peace Monument. Atop a rugged block of pink granite sits a white dove as a symbol of peace. The words Paix and Peace are inscribed on a polished panel. The monument was funded through contributions from government, veterans’ organizations, and private donors.

=== Canadian Artillery Monument ===
In 2024, the Second Field Artillery Regiment, RCA, gifted a Howitzer 105 mm - C1, which was in service with the Royal Regiment of Canadian Artillery between 1956 and 1998, to the National Field of Honour. The Ambassador of France to Canada, Michel Mirallet, unveiled the monument in 2024, during the 80th anniversary of the Normandy landings on June 6, 1944.

=== The Columbarium ===
Taking advantage of the 2005 official Year of the Veteran the cemetery added a twelve-unit granit-stone Columbarium at the west end of the property for up to 800 urne burials.

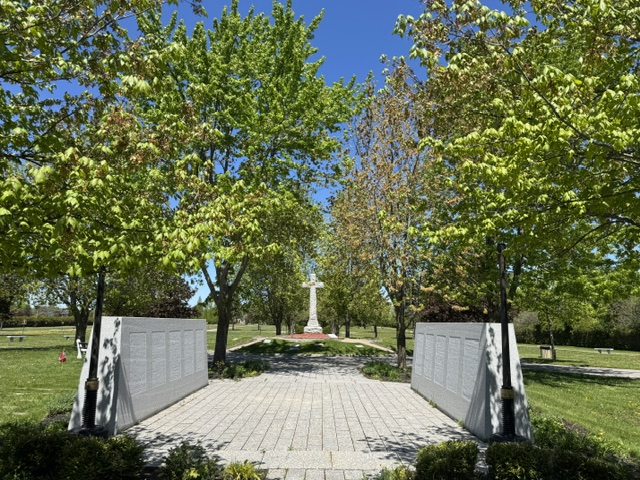
Commonwealth War Graves Memorial at the National Field of Honour

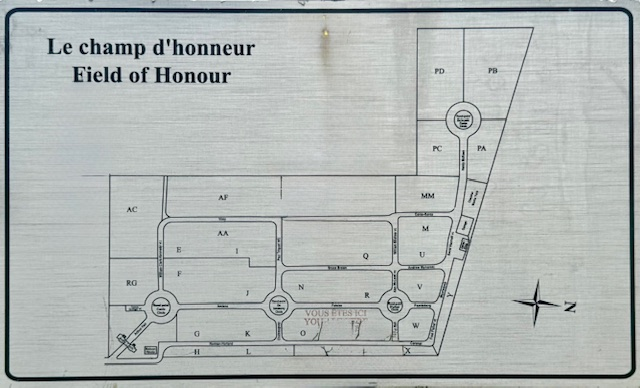
Mapsign at National Field of Honour Pointe-Claire

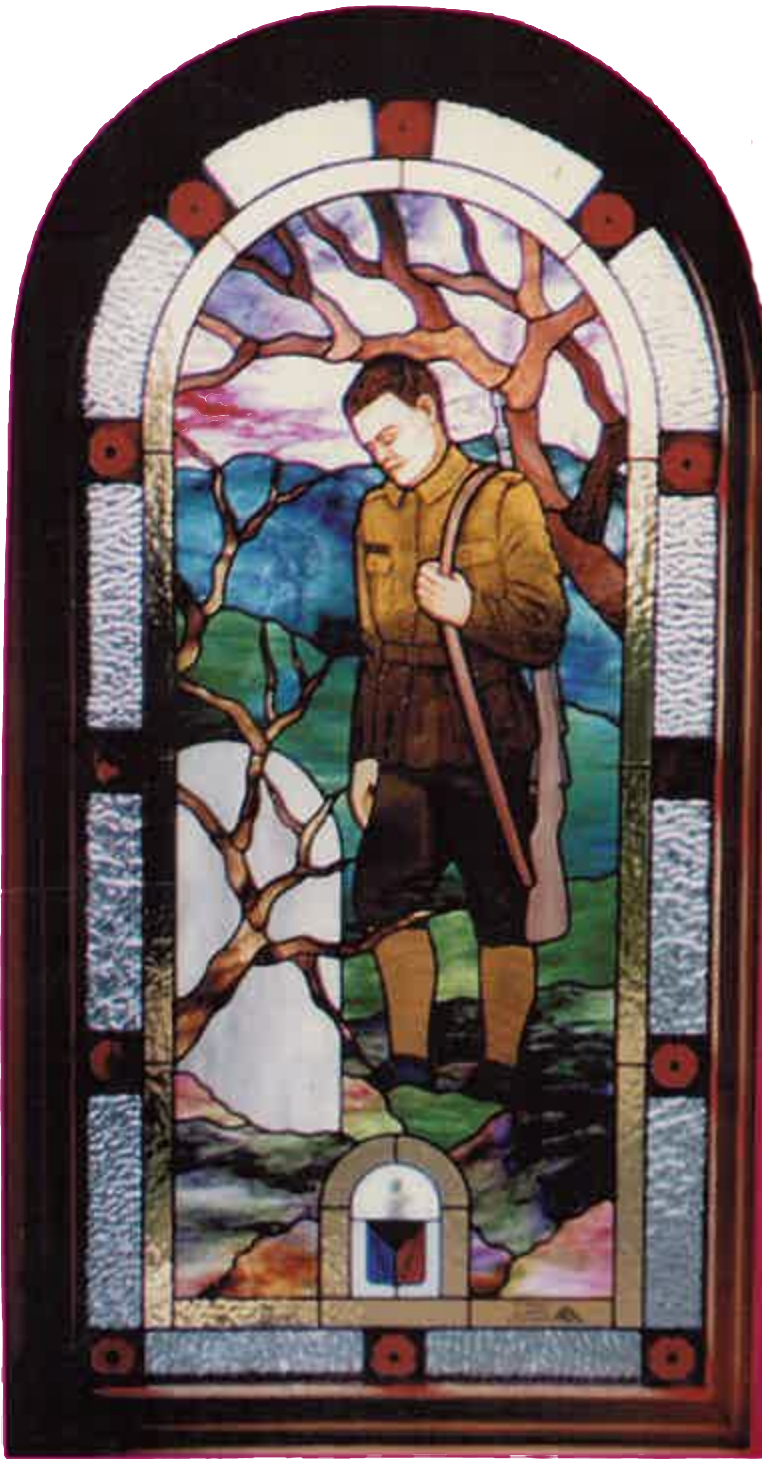
Stained Glass Window of grieving soldier by Nicole Gascon

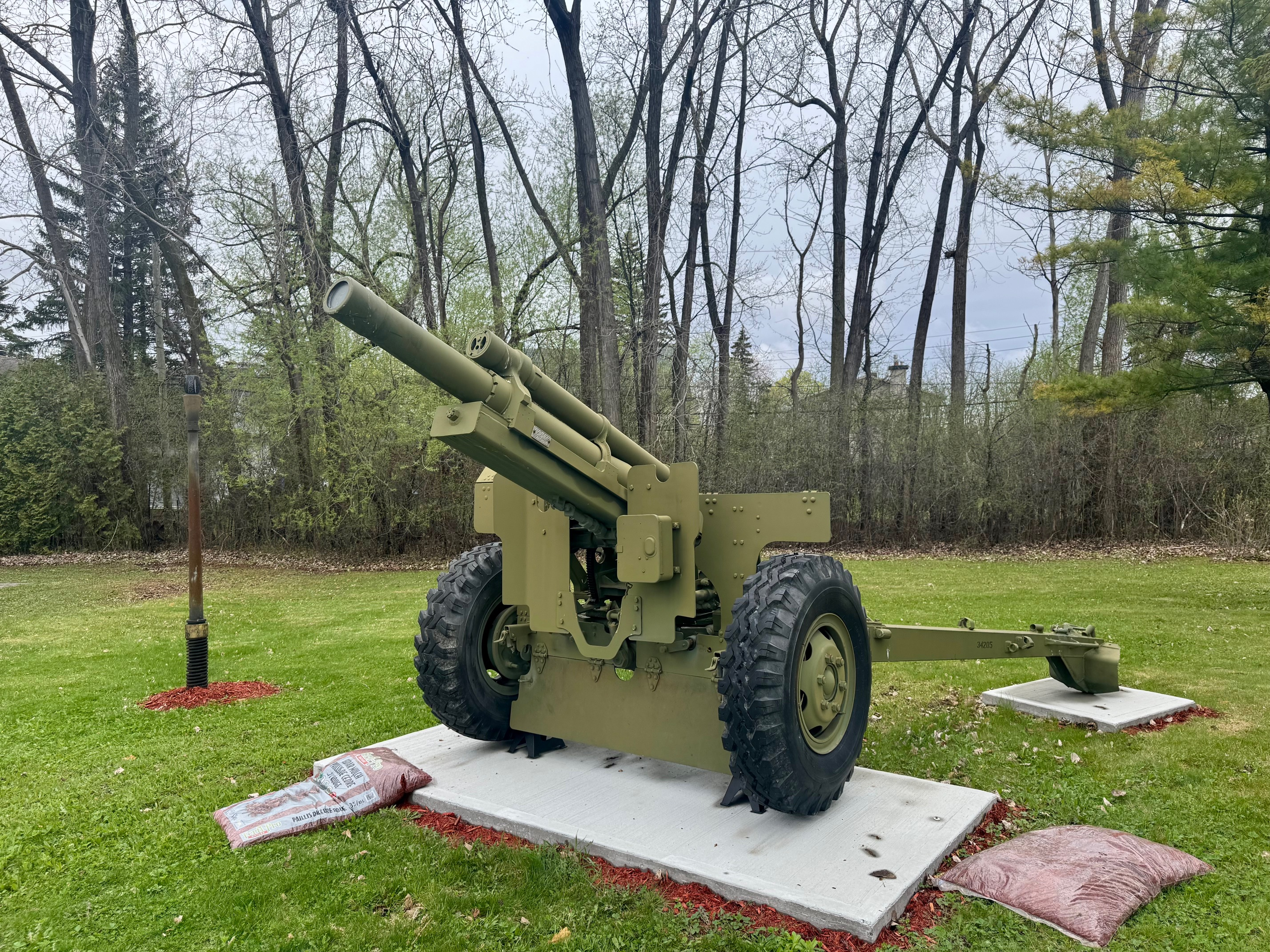
Howitzer 105 mm - C1, Canadian Artillery Monument

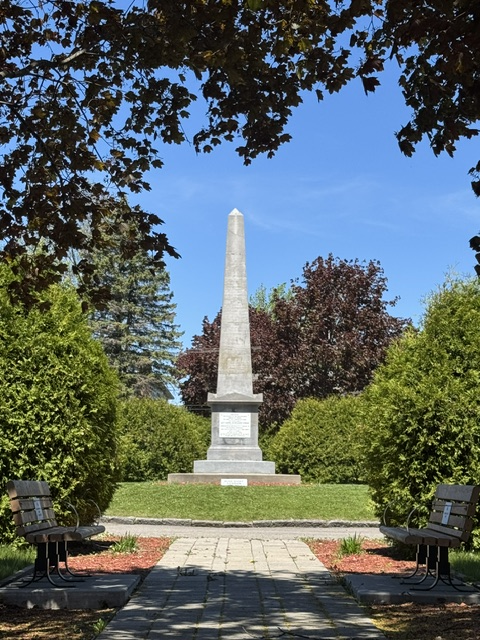
D'Urbain Circle with Obelisk

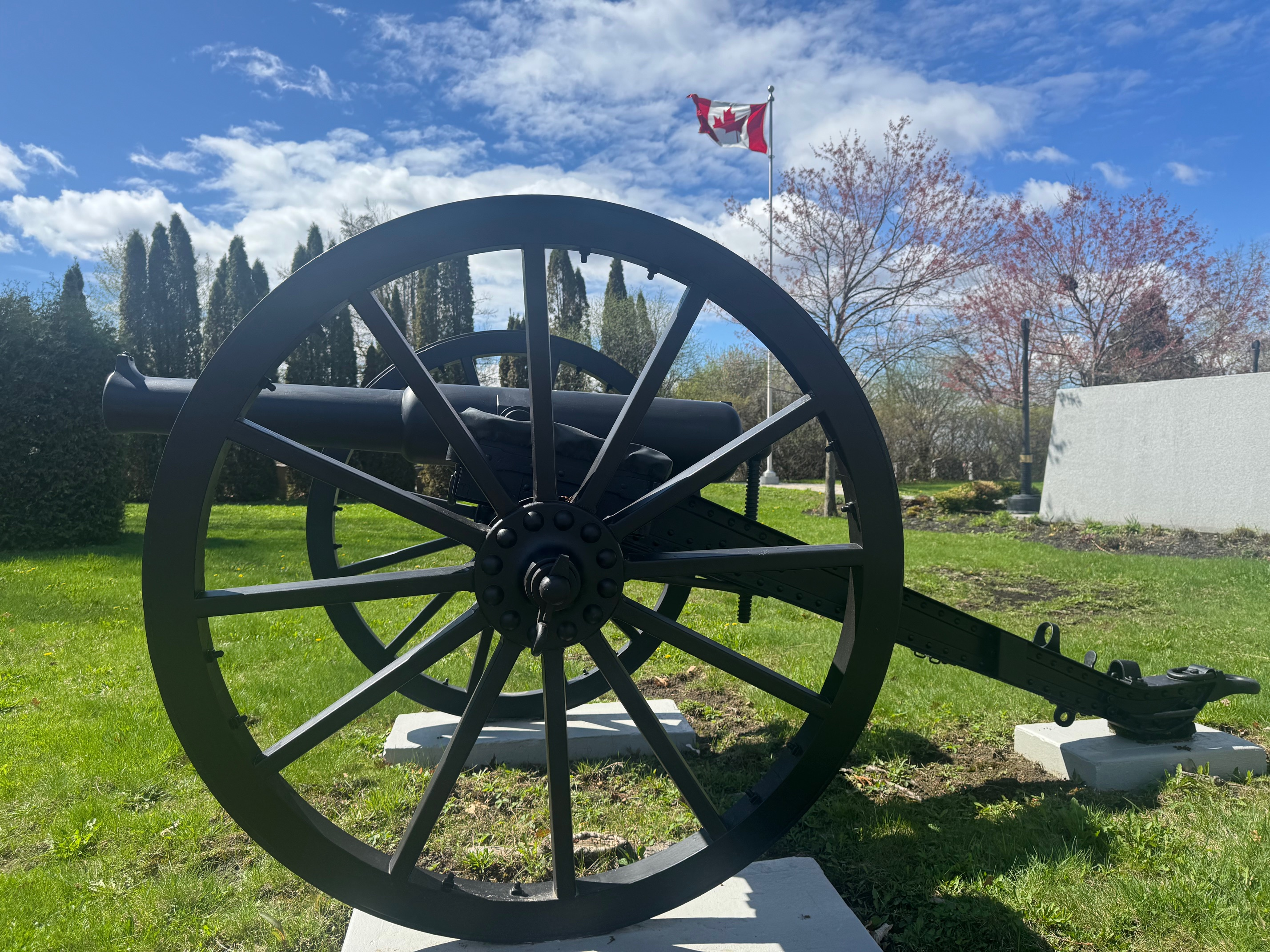
One of two dual six-inch cannons of the Army Memorial

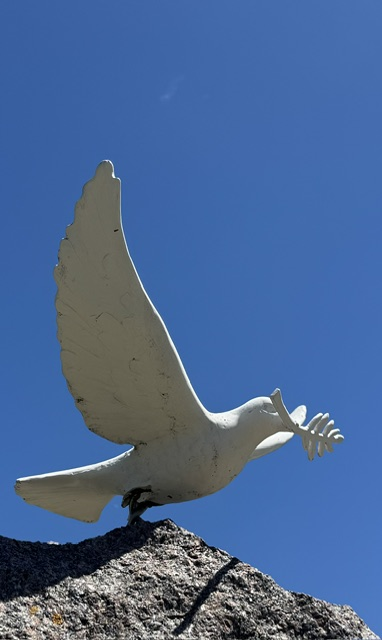
Peace Dove, detail of the Peace Circle Monument

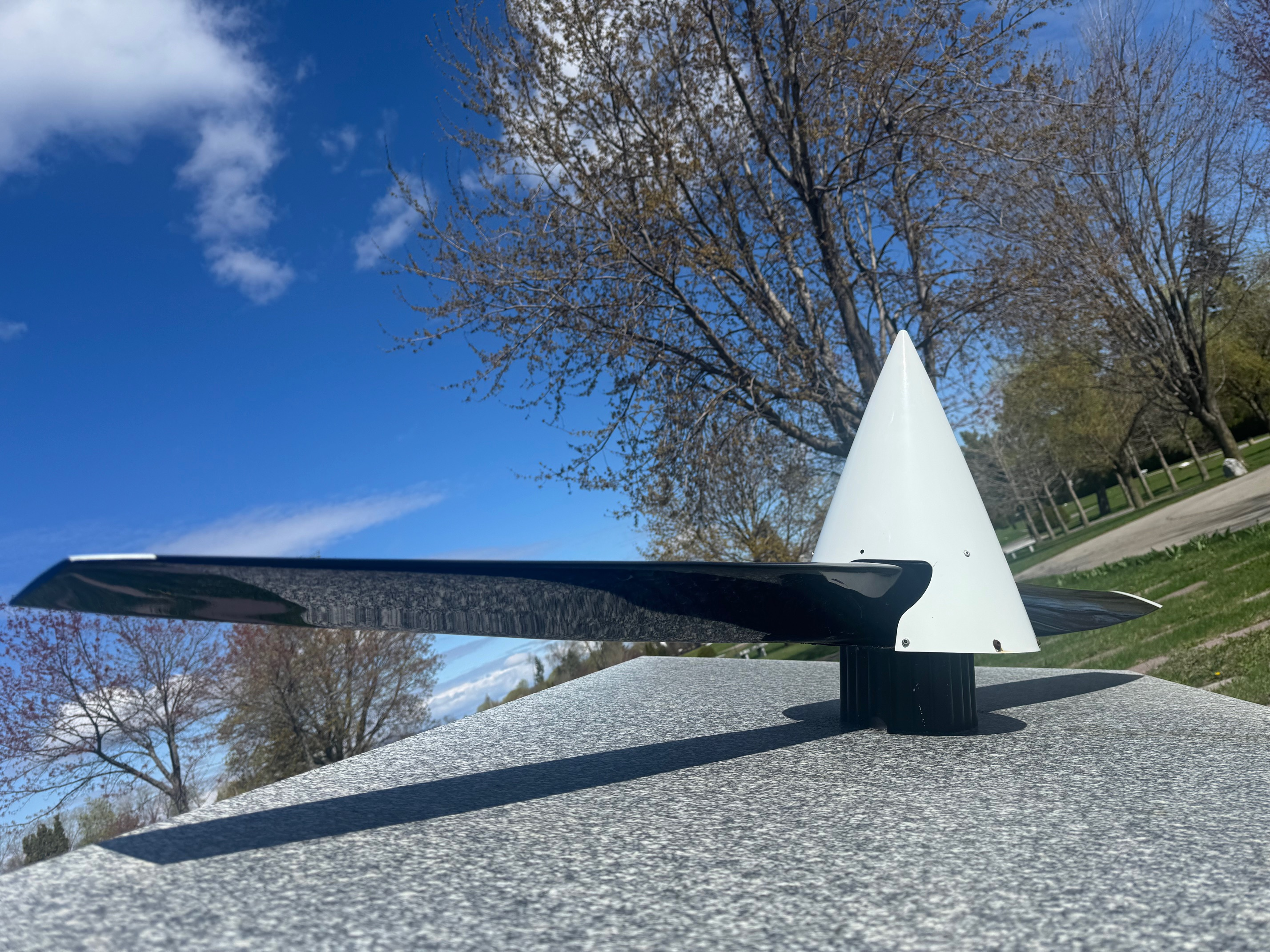
Two-blade propeller, detail of the Air Force Memorial

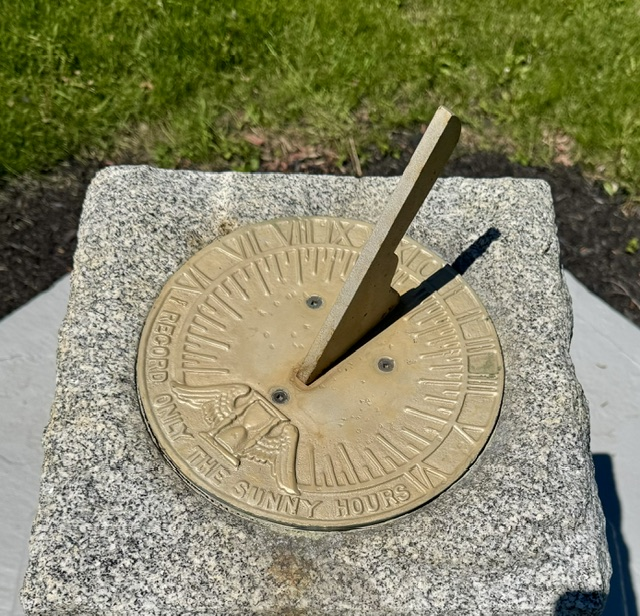
Sun Dial indicating the hour close to noon

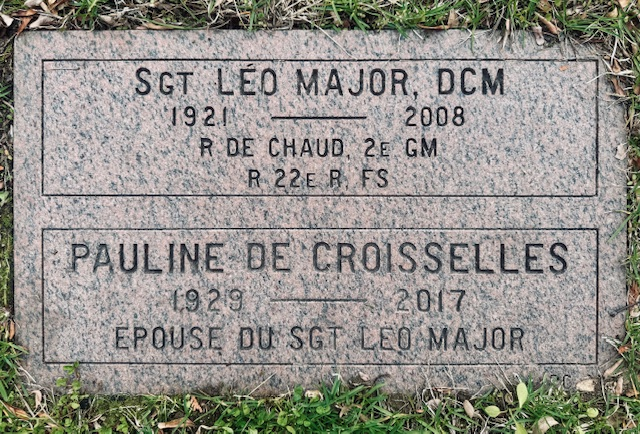
Gravemarker for Sergeant Leo Major

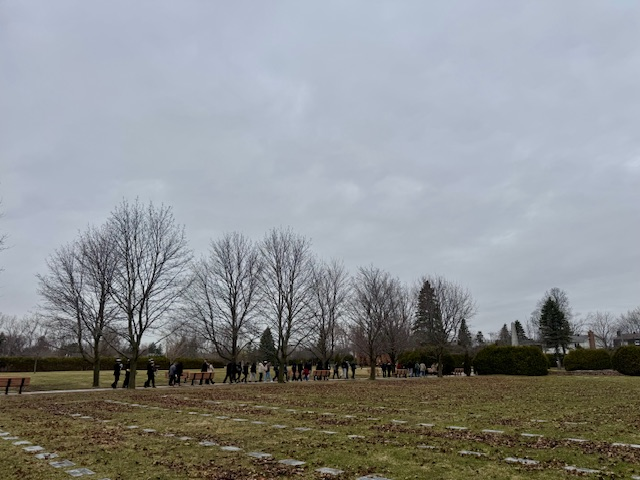
School Visit at the National Field of Honour April 2026

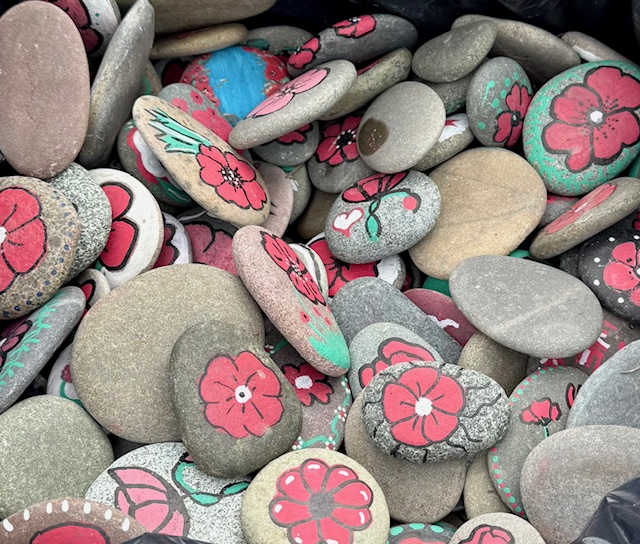
Painted stones to commemorate veterans at the National Field of Honour

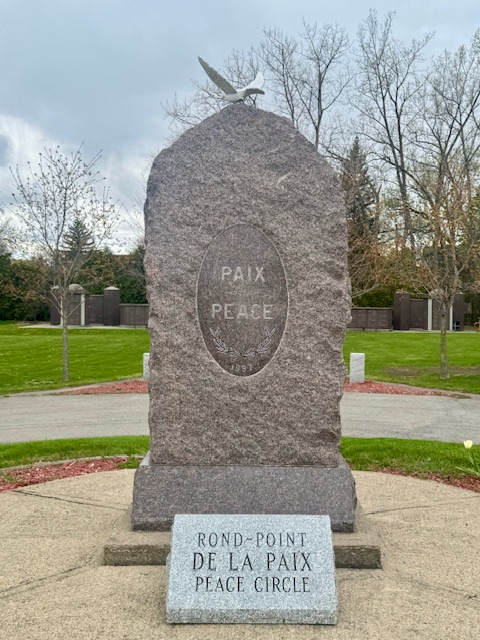
Monument of the Peace Circle at the National Field of Honour

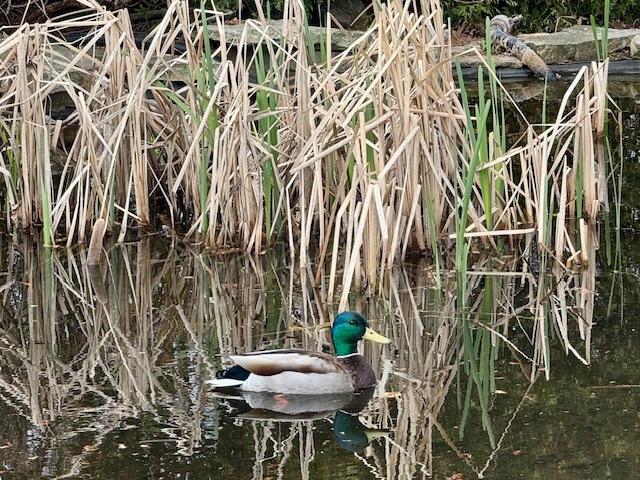
Duck swimming in the watergarden at the National Field of Honour Pointe-Claire

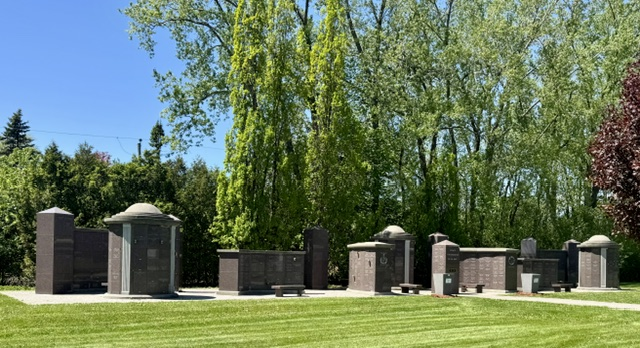
12-part Columbarium at the National Field of Honour in Pointe-Claire

== Notable Individuals buried in the NFH, Pointe-Claire ==
- Capt Gerald Raymond Edgar Arthur, AF-380 (1913-1985) was a war correspondent for Radio Canada. Later, he was one of the four appointed journalists attending the coronation of Queen Elizabeth II life in Westminster Abbey
- Major Lionel Guy D'Artois, OSO, G.M., C.D. (1917–1999), and wife Operative Sonya Butt, M.B.E., L.D’H. (SC-39) (1924–2014) were distinguished members of the Special Operations Executive who served behind enemy lines in occupied France during the Second World War.
- CMDR Harold Beament, U.M. RG-328 (1898 – 1984) was an official Canadian war artist during the Second World War.
- Clarence S. Campbell, Lieutenant Colonel, OBE, QC — He oversaw major expansion of the National Hockey League from six teams to twenty-one during his tenure as league president from 1946 to 1977.
- Benjamin d'Urban, Lieutenant-General, GCB, KCH, KCTS — He was a British general and colonial administrator best known for serving as governor of the Cape Colony, and the city of Durban was named in his honour.
- Jack Gelineau, BEM — He was a decorated Canadian veteran who received the British Empire Medal for his distinguished military service and contributions to veterans’ organizations.
- Nancy Blodwen Kennedy-Reid (1902–1994) was a Canadian Royal Canadian Army Medical Corps officer who served as a senior military nurse during the Second World War, working in Canadian military hospitals overseas and later receiving the Royal Red Cross for distinguished service.
- Leo Major, Private, DCM and Medal Bar — He became one of Canada’s most celebrated soldiers after single-handedly liberating the Dutch city of Zwolle during World War II.
- Coulson Norman Mitchell, Lieutenant Colonel, VC, MC — He was awarded the Victoria Cross for leading a daring assault across the Canal du Nord in 1918 during the First World War.
- Clifford McEwen, Air vice-marshal — He played a key leadership role in the development of the Royal Canadian Air Force during World War II and later became Canada’s first air vice marshal.
- 2nd Baron William Graham Shaughnessy (1921–2003) was a Canadian soldier and businessman. Born in Montreal, he was the grandson of Thomas George Shaughnessy, 1st Baron Shaughnessy, president of the Canadian Pacific Railway. W.G. Shaughnessy was a member of the House of Lords until 1999.
- Edgar Trottier (1915-1977), was a war veteran of French-Canadian descent who was killed on February 6, 1977, when he was struck and dragged by a car driven by then-Quebec Premier René Lévesque.

== See also ==
- List of Canadian Victoria Cross recipients
- Canadian Armed Forces ranks and insignia
- Cross of Sacrifice

== Bibliography ==
- Clarkson, Ashley. Gate of Remembrance. Last Post Fund, August 2010. Concordia University–associated archival paper document.
- Commonwealth War Graves Commission. "Pointe-Claire Field of Honour Cemetery Report." Commonwealth War Graves Commission.
- Durflinger, Serge. Lest We Forget. Montreal: Last Post Fund, 2000.
- Historic Sites and Monuments Board of Canada. "List of Designations approved on June 8, 2007 by the Minister of the Environment." 8 June 2007.
- Last Post Fund Québec Branch. National Field of Honour: Self-guided Tour Brochure. Pointe-Claire: Last Post Fund.
- Veterans Affairs Canada. "National Field of Honour Cemetery." Government of Canada.
- Parks Canada. "Last Post Fund National Field of Honour National Historic Site of Canada."
- The Canadian Encyclopedia. "Last Post Fund / National Field of Honour" entries.
- Morton, Desmond. A Military History of Canada. McClelland & Stewart.
- Vance, Jonathan F. Death So Noble: Memory, Meaning, and the First World War. UBC Press.
- Granatstein, J. L. Canada’s Army: Waging War and Keeping the Peace. University of Toronto Press.
