= St. Paul's Anglican Church, Durban =

South African church

Coordinates: 29°51′26″S 31°01′33″E

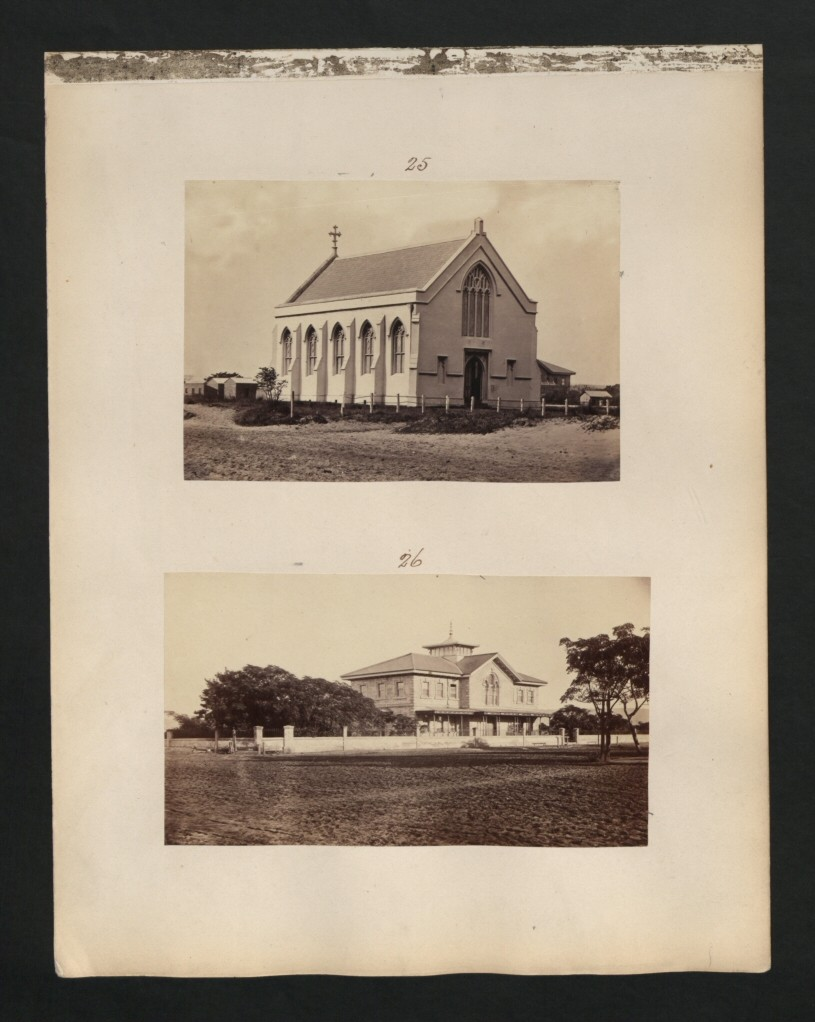
St. Paul's Anglican Church in Durban.

St. Paul's Anglican Church is an Anglican church in Durban, KwaZulu-Natal, South Africa. The original St. Paul's Church was built in 1853. Partially funded by a donation from Benjamin D'Urban (for whom the city is named), the church burnt to the ground in 1906. A new, larger church was built on the same site in 1910.
