= Last Post Fund =

Canadian non-profit

- Formation: 1909
- Founder: Arthur Hair
- Type: Non-profit
- Headquarters: Montreal, Quebec, Canada
- Official language: English, French
- Executive Director: Martine Moreau
- Affiliations: Veterans Affairs Canada
- Website: lastpostfund.ca

The Last Post Fund (French: Fonds du Souvenir) is a Canadian non-profit organization and registered charity which was founded in 1909. The Last Post Fund's mission is to ensure that "no Veteran is denied a dignified funeral and burial, as well as a military gravestone, due to insufficient funds at time of death." Its primary mandate is to deliver the Veterans Affairs Canada Funeral & Burial Program which provides funeral, burial and grave marking benefits for eligible Canadian and Allied Veterans. The fund also delivers an Unmarked Grave Program which places military-style gravestones for Veterans are buried without commemoration. In addition to delivering these Programs, the Last Post Fund supports other initiatives designed to honour the memory of Canadian and Allied Veterans.

The Last Post Fund National Field of Honour in Pointe-Claire, Quebec, was established in 1930. It is now the final resting place for more than 22,000 servicemen and women, and their family members. In 2009, the centennial year of the Last Post Fund, the National Field of Honour was designated as a National Historic Site by the Historic Sites and Monuments Board of Canada.

== History ==
Established in Montreal in 1909 by Arthur Hair, the fund has grown from a private organization to a nationwide program supported by federal funds and private donations. In 1908 two Montreal police officers found a homeless man (James Daly), whom they took to the hospital. The man was presumed drunk, and the staff left him to "sleep it off". Hair, the head orderly of the hospital, went to check on the man and saw an envelope in his pocket which he recognized as honorable discharge papers from the British War Office. Daly had served with the British military for over 20 years. Two days later Daly died (he had hypothermia and malnutrition, not drunk), and as his body was unclaimed it was to be donated to research (as per standard practice). Not satisfied with what would happen to the veteran, Hair raised money to give him a proper burial at Notre Dame des Neiges Cemetery. The Last Post Fund was established in Montreal a year later. Initially the fund was financed through private donations, but in 1921 it was incorporated and began receiving funds from the Government of Canada. Initially Catholic veterans were buried in Notre Dame des Neiges Cemetery whilst Protestants were buried in Mount Royal Cemetery. As the two cemeteries filled the Quebec division of the Last Post Fund purchased land in Pointe-Claire, Quebec in 1929, which they developed into the National Field of Honour, established a year later.

The British Columbia board of directors currently consists of Gino Simeoni, Alistair Vigier, Beth Brown, Door Gibson, Ed Fitch, Ike Hall, Ken Usher and Jim Billinger.

== Service Eligibility ==
To meet the service criteria, the deceased must be either:

- A former member of the Canadian Armed Forces, or any predecessor naval, army or air forces of Canada or Newfoundland (who dies anywhere in the world);
- A Canadian Merchant Navy Veteran serving in either Second World War or the Korean War;
- An Allied Veteran who served with the Allied Forces during the Second World War or the Korean War and either:
  - Has lived in Canada for at least 10 years;
  - Lived in Canada prior to enlisting in the armed forces and was living in Canada at time of death.

== Financial Eligibility for the Funeral & Burial Program ==
Once service criteria has been met, the amount of assistance that may be provided is calculated using a means test as established by Veterans Affairs Canada. The means test is an assessment of assets and liabilities held by the estate at time of death (not on annual income). Exemptions are offered where there is a surviving spouse or dependent child.

== Funeral & Burial Services Under the Funeral & Burial Program ==
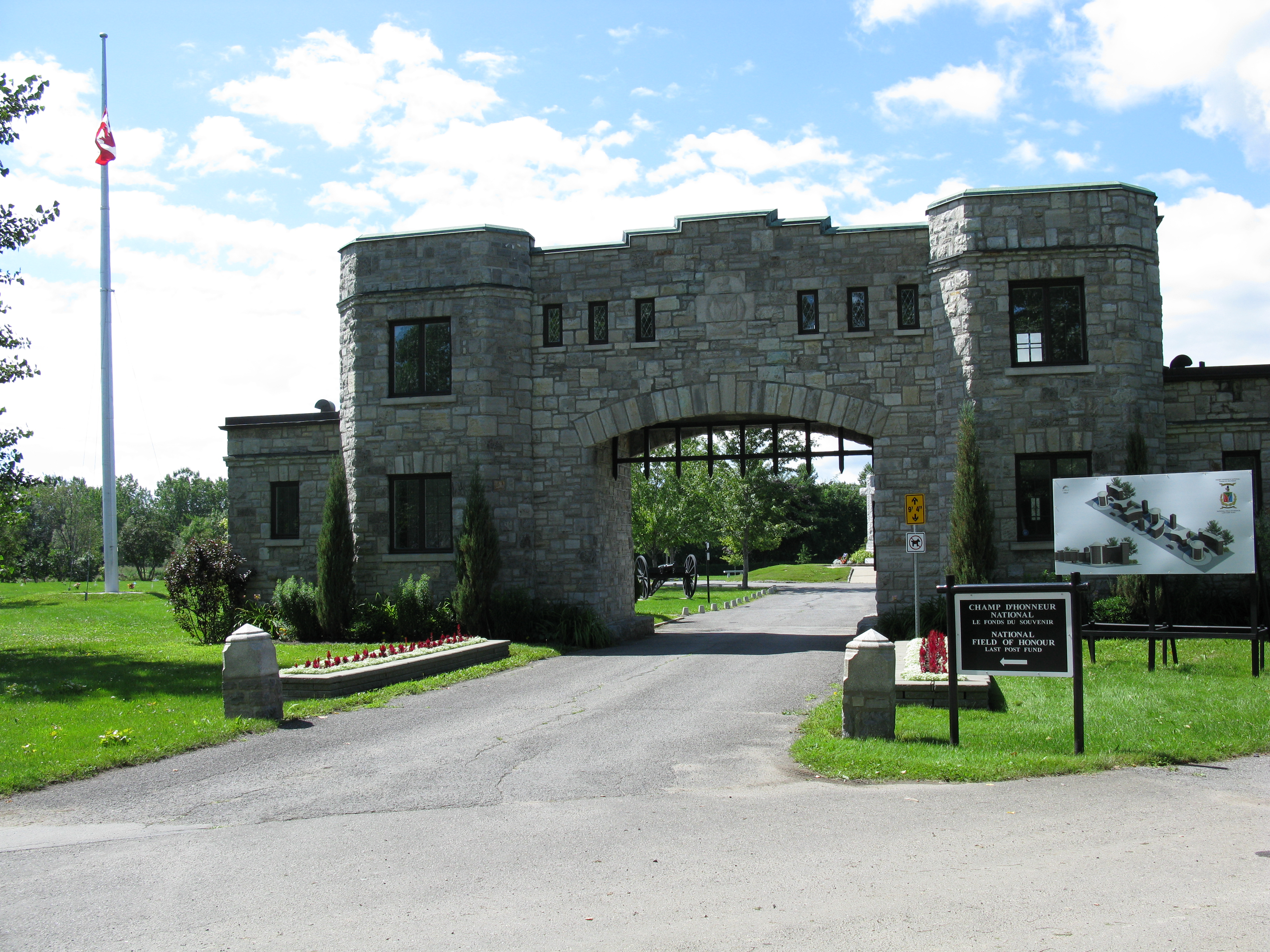
Entry to the National Field of Honour

Once eligibility is determined for assistance under the Funeral & Burial Program, the Last Post Fund will provide money for funeral expenses and professional services (up to $7,376 at the Funeral Home). In addition, the cost of cremation, burial expenses such as a plot and interment may be covered. Last Post Fund may also assist by arranging a military gravestone or marker as part of the benefit package for accepted cases. Applications should be made within one year of the date of death of the Veteran.

== Unmarked Grave Program ==
The Last Post Fund delivers an Unmarked Grave Program (UGP) which places military-style gravestones for Veterans who have been deceased for five years or more and have no other permanent gravestone. There is no financial qualification for the Unmarked Grave Program.

== Budget and Allocation ==
The Last Post Fund is financed through Veterans Affairs Canada and through private donations. For 2012/2013 the Last Post Fund had a budget of $9.5 million, of which it spent $8.6 million. The 2013 Canadian federal budget increased the amount of money one would receive for expenses at a funeral home (from $3600 to $7376), however the exemption offered in the case of married Veterans (in the means test) was not changed, remaining at $36,310 in net assets (as well as the exemption of a home and vehicle). With the number of World War II and Korean War veterans steadily decreasing, the fund will be spending less money annually.
