= Sydney Hudson =

British alpine skier

Personal information
- Full name: Christopher Sydney Hudson
- Nationality: British
- Born: 1 August 1910 Royal Tunbridge Wells, Kent, England
- Died: 7 April 2005 (aged 94) Livingston, West Lothian, Scotland

Christopher Sydney Hudson (1 August 1910 – 7 April 2005) was a British alpine skier and an agent of the British clandestine Special Operations Executive during World War II. He competed in the men's combined event at the 1936 Winter Olympics. Hudson worked in France and Southeast Asia as an SOE agent. The purpose of SOE was to conduct espionage, sabotage and reconnaissance in Axis occupied countries. SOE agents allied themselves with resistance groups and supplied them with weapons and equipment.

Hudson undertook two missions to France, occupied by Nazi Germany, for SOE. In his first mission in 1942, he was soon captured and spent fifteen months imprisoned. He escaped and returned to Britain and was dispatched a second time to France, serving with distinction before and after the D-Day invasion on 6 June 1944. After the reconquest of France by the Allies, SOE sent him to Southeast Asia with Force 136 where he worked mostly in Thailand and Laos fomenting resistance to the Japanese occupation and, after the war, repatriating both Allied soldiers captured by the Japanese and Japanese soldiers. He worked in a defeated Germany from 1947 to 1953 for international agencies involved in reconstruction and rehabilitation.

Returning to Britain, Hudson became a successful businessman. He helped establish the Social Democratic Party in Scotland in the early 1980s.

== Early life ==
Sydney "Soapy" Hudson was born in Tunbridge Wells, Kent, the son of Theodore and Ella Hudson. His father was a businessman and a British Vice-Consul in Switzerland. Hudson grew up in Montreux. Hudson was a talented skier, golfer, and tennis player. As a young man, he skied in Switzerland in the winter and played golf at the Royal Eastbourne Golf Club in Britain in the warmer months. In 1933, Hudson became the British ski champion, and was named the vice-captain of the British Olympic team. At the 1936 Winter Olympics in Garmisch-Partenkirchen, Germany, Hudson competed in the men's combined event, where he finished in 29th place. In 1938, he married Joan who was also a member of the British ski team. The couple had a daughter, named Jennifer, born 23 September 1942. He was in the chemical business in Switzerland; but, in August 1939, a few days before World War II began, he returned to Great Britain.

Biographer Ayed described Hudson as tall, blue-eyed, and handsome. He had a "wry humour and a laconic approach to life."

== SOE agent ==
=== First mission ===
On 13 June 1940, Hudson joined the Royal Fusiliers. He described his experiences as a soldier "mostly boring." After mentioning that he spoke French, in January 1942 he was ordered to go to a meeting at the War Office. At that meeting he was invited to join the SOE and become an agent in France. After training Hudson was selected to create and lead the Headmaster circuit (or network) which was to operate in the Auvergne region, centered on the city of Clermont-Ferrand which was in Vichy France, at the time the part of France not occupied by the Germans. On 24 September 1942, Hudson, code named Marc, parachuted into Vichy France with his two assistants Brian Rafferty, a courier, and George Jones, a wireless operator.

With help from the Werther's, a Jewish family, Hudson set up a headquarters near Le Crest. However, about October 8, he was captured by the Vichy police. He had hopes that the police would release him, but instead he was put on trial and sentenced to five years in prison on the charge of illegal entry into France. He was transported to a large prison near Villeneuve-sur-Lot in southwestern France. He attempted unsuccessfully to bribe the guards to allow him to escape and noted that in 1943, as the war turned in favor of the allies, the French guards became friendlier. On 3 January 1944, Hudson and 53 other prisoners escaped the prison. They were helped by SOE agents George Starr and Anne-Marie Walters to cross the Pyrenees to Spain on foot and, with aid from the British Consulate in Barcelona, to make their way to Gibraltar and hence by airplane to Britain.

=== Second mission ===
Hudson, code named Albin; returned to France on 9 April 1944. Parachuting with him was Muriel Byck, a wireless operator who would soon die of meningitis. His area of operations was Sarthe centered on the city of Le Mans. His task was to build up the resistance networks, arm them with weapons and equipment parachuted in, and train them in the use of the weapons. His network focused on ambushes and disabling telephone lines.

Hudson requested SOE to send him a female courier, women being able to travel more easily than men, and in late May Sonya Butt arrived. That was a shock to him as they had had a brief romance in England prior to her marriage to another SOE agent, Guy D'Artois. Butt, only nineteen years old when recruited, was SOE's youngest agent. Hudson and Butt quickly resumed their romance and she, bold and forthright, took on responsibilities of organization and weapons training. To finance the resistance groups, called maquis, Hudson borrowed 200,000 French Francs (about 7,000 British pounds in 1944) from the Catholic Church in Le Mans. SOE later repaid the loan.

With the capture of Le Mans on 9 August 1944, Hudson and his group offered their services to the American army and worked behind the German defense lines supplying intelligence to the Americans. Butt was raped by two German soldiers during this time. In mid September Hudson's work in France was finished as the allied armies had expelled the Germans. Hudson and Butt met her husband, Guy, in Paris, and Butt proclaimed her love for D'Artois, thus ending the romance between her and Hudson.

=== Southeast Asia ===
Returning to Great Britain in September 1944, Hudson joined Force 136, an SOE operation in Southeast Asia contesting the Japanese occupation. He traveled by ship to Bombay and hence to Ceylon (now Sri Lanka) where he trained potential resisters to the Japanese. In early 1945, he parachuted into Thailand to organize the Thai resistance. After the war with Japan ended in September 1945, he assisted in the repatriation of allied prisoners-of-war from camps scattered around Southeast Asia, plus the repatriation of Japanese prisoners-of war to Japan. Hudson became, in his own words, "de facto governor" of Pakse, Laos until French rule was restored. With a rank of Lt. Colonel, Hudson was demobilized in February 1946.

For his work with SOE, Hudson was honoured twice with a Distinguished Service Order, plus a Croix de Guerre.

== After the war ==
Hudson returned to Switzerland in 1946, but, dissatisfied his job with the family chemical company, he joined the Control Commission for Germany and worked in Berlin and with German miners until 1951. He then went to work with the U.S. High Commissioner for Germany for two more years. He returned to England in mid-1953.

Hudson divorced his wife Joan in 1952 and married Ruth Risse, a German who was one-half Jewish, in May 1954.

Hudson worked for Shell International, before moving to Scotland at the end of the 1960s to work for the Bank of Scotland. He also worked for the Confederation of British Industry (CBI), and became a chairman of CBI Scotland. He helped to establish the Social Democratic Party in Scotland in the early 1980s. In 2003, Hudson wrote the book Undercover Operator about his time in the SOE. He died in Livingston, West Lothian, Scotland, in April 2005 at the age of 94.
