= Norman Mitchell Lake =

Lake in Manitoba, Canada

- Location of the lake in Manitoba Norman Mitchell Lake (Canada)
- Location: Division No. 22, Northern Manitoba
- Coordinates: 55.696667°N 96.211944°W
- Basin countries: Canada
- Settlements: None

Norman Mitchell Lake was named in honour of L/Col C. Norman Mitchell on October 25, 2013 in central Manitoba, approximately 90 kilometres east of Thompson, Manitoba. The lake is located at 55° 41’ 48" latitude and 96° 12’ 43 longitude.

== See also ==
- List of lakes of Manitoba
