= Benjamin D'Urban =

British general and colonial administrator (1777–1849)

Lieutenant-General Sir Benjamin D'Urban GCB KCH FRS
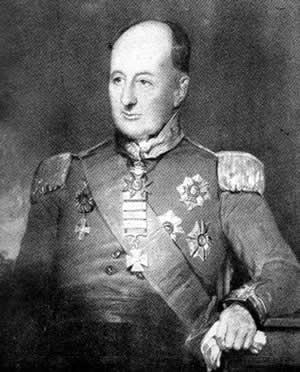
- Born: Benjamin D'Urban; 16 February 1777; Halesworth, Suffolk, England
- Died: 25 May 1849 (aged 72); Montreal, Canada East
- Military career
- Allegiance: United Kingdom
- Branch: British Army
- Service years: 1793–1849
- Rank: Lieutenant-General
- Commands: British troops in Canada
- Conflicts: Napoleonic Wars
- Awards: Knight Grand Cross of the Order of the Bath; Knight Commander of the Royal Guelphic Order

Lieutenant-General Sir Benjamin D'Urban GCB KCH FRS (16 February 1777 – 25 May 1849) was a British general and colonial administrator, who is best known for his frontier policy when he was the Governor in the Cape Colony (now in South Africa). Durban (formerly called Port Natal), the third-largest city in South Africa, was renamed in his honor.

== Early career ==
D'Urban was born in Halesworth, the youngest but only surviving son of Benjamin D'Urban, and joined the British Army in 1793, enlisting as a cornet in the Queen's Bays at the age of sixteen. He made rapid progress in the Army and distinguished himself in the Peninsular War. Assigned to the Portuguese army, he was quartermaster general and chief-of-staff to William Carr Beresford, 1st Viscount Beresford. He served in all the principal sieges and battles, never asked to go on leave, and was laden with honours, being appointed Knight Grand Cross of the Order of the Bath, Knight Commander of the Royal Guelphic Order, and Commander of the Portuguese Order of the Tower and Sword. He received the Army Gold Cross and five clasps for the battles of Busaco, Albuera, Badajoz, Salamanca, Vitoria, the Pyrenees, Nivelle, the Nive, and Toulouse.

Brigadier General D'Urban was given command of a Portuguese cavalry brigade consisting of the 1st, 11th and 12th Dragoons. At the Battle of Salamanca on 22 July 1812, D'Urban's troopers performed well while assisting the 3rd Division's attack on the French left flank. During the Siege of Burgos campaign, D'Urban's horsemen were routed in an action at Majadahonda (Las Rozas) on 11 August, losing 108 men. His brigade was present but not engaged at the Battle of Vitoria in June 1813.

== Foreign service ==
In 1819, D'Urban was made Governor of Antigua. In 1824 he became Lieutenant Governor of Demerara Essequibo, where in 1831 he carried out the amalgamation with Berbice to form British Guiana, of which he was its first governor (1831–33). Three years later he was appointed to the post of Governor of the Cape Colony. In 1829 he was made Colonel of the 51st (2nd Yorkshire West Riding) Regiment of Foot, a position he held for life.

In January 1834 in South Africa D'Urban took office as governor and commander in chief of the Cape Colony. His administration was complicated by the exodus of Dutch farmers to the far north and east (known as the Great Trek) and the outbreak of the Cape Frontier Wars of (1834–1835) due to clashes between the colonists and the Bantu-speaking Xhosa peoples. He drove back the Xhosa people and annexed the territory between the Keiskamma and Great Kei (Groot-Kei) rivers. He was in office when the British government abolished slavery, established municipal and legislative councils, occupied Natal (now KwaZulu-Natal) and named it as a new colony for the British Empire. To commemorate this the name of the principal port was changed in 1835 from Port Natal to Durban.

== Trouble ==
Although D'Urban was popular with the white colonists, his treatment of the Xhosa people and other Africans in South Africa disturbed John Philip, who went to England to give evidence before a parliamentary committee and aroused public opinion against D'Urban. The public outcry influenced Charles Grant, 1st Baron Glenelg, the colonial secretary.

In a despatch dated 1 May 1837, Glenelg dismissed D'Urban, who remained governor until the arrival of his successor in January 1838 and continued in his military capacity in South Africa until 1846.

== Later career ==
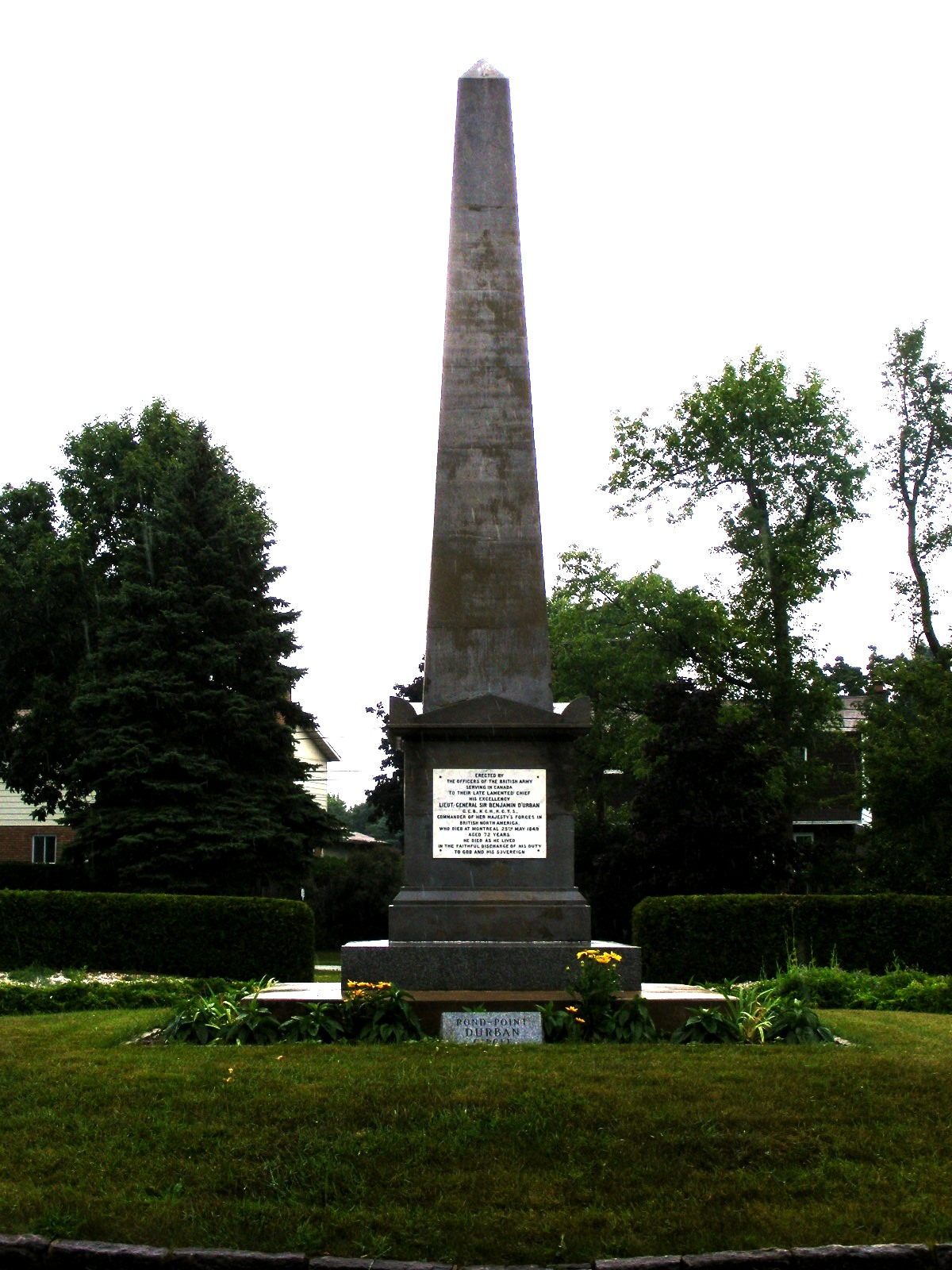
D'Urban's grave, at the National Field of Honour.

In 1842, D'Urban declined a high military appointment in British Raj India offered him by Sir Robert Peel. In January 1847 he accepted appointment as commander of Her Majesty's forces in British North America. There were border disputes and a threat of invasion by the United States into Canada near Montreal by the Fenians. Early in 1847 he set up his headquarters in Montreal.

He remained in Montreal until his death in 1849. He was originally buried at the Papineau military cemetery in Montreal. However, the graves had to be moved because they were in the way of building a new access ramp to the Jacques Cartier Bridge. Sir Benjamin D'Urban's remains now rest at the Last Post Fund National Field of Honour, a military cemetery owned by the Last Post Fund in Pointe-Claire where there is an obelisk to his memory.

On the obelisk, there are four plaques: a memorial plaque from the officers of the British Army serving in Canada, a second memorial plaque donated by the City of Durban, one explaining the exhumation and reburial by the Last Post Fund, and one explaining the reburial of the other remains in D'Urban Circle.

== Sources ==
- D'Urban, Benjamin (1930). The Peninsular Journal Of Major-General Sir Benjamin D'Urban: 1808–1817. London: Longmans & Co. ISBN 978-1-78625-499-3.
- Glover, Michael (2001). The Peninsular War, 1807-1814: A Concise Military History. London: Penguin. ISBN 978-0-14-139041-3.
- Oman, Charles (1913). Wellington's Army, 1809-1814. London: Greenhill Books. ISBN 978-0-947898-41-0.
- Smith, Digby George (1998). The Greenhill Napoleonic Wars Data Book. London: Greenhill Books. ISBN 978-1-85367-276-7.

Government offices
Preceded by George William Ramsay	Governor of Antigua; 1819–1826	Succeeded by Sir Patrick Ross
New creation	Governor of British Guiana; 1831–1833	Succeeded by James Carmichael Smyth
Preceded by Sir Lowry Cole	Governor of the Cape Colony; 1834–1838	Succeeded by Sir George Thomas Napier
Military offices
Preceded by The Earl Cathcart	Commander-in-Chief, North America; 1847–1849	Succeeded by Sir William Rowan
Preceded by Sir Thomas Hislop, 1st Baronet	Colonel of the 51st (2nd Yorkshire West Riding) Regiment of Foot; 1829–1849	Succeeded by Sir Thomas Willshire, 1st Baronet
