= Guy D'Artois =

Canadian army & SOE officer (1917-1999)

Lionel Guy d'Artois DSO GM CD
- Guy and his wife Sonya Butt
- Born: 9 April 1917; Richmond, Quebec, Canada
- Died: 15 March 1999 (aged 81); Sainte-Anne-de-Bellevue Veterans hospital
- Spouse: Sonya Butt (m. 1945)
- Children: 6
- Military career
- Allegiance: Canada
- Branch: Canadian Army
- Service years: 1934-1953
- Rank: Major
- Units: First Special Service Force; Special Operations Executive; Canadian Special Air Service Company; Royal 22^{e} Régiment
- Conflicts: World War II; Korean War
- Awards: George Medal; Distinguished Service Order; Croix de guerre

Major Lionel Guy d'Artois DSO GM (9 April 1917 – 15 March 1999) was a Canadian Army officer and SOE agent.

== Biography ==
Lionel Guy (generally known by his second name) d'Artois was born in Richmond, Quebec in 1917. He joined the Militia (part-time army reserves) in 1934, at the age of 16. In 1936, he became a student at the Université de Montréal, but dropped his studies in 1939, to enlist as private.

He later joined the First Special Service Force and in 1942 he was commissioned. He served as an instructor in savate, and in August 1943 took part in "Operation Cottage", the reoccupation of the island of Kiska in the Aleutians.

In 1943 he volunteered for SOE, one of several French-Canadians attached to F section. On the night of 23/24 May he left England and parachuted into the department of the Saone et Loire, France, under the codename "Dieudonné". He arrived in France as a member of the DITCHER network headed by Albert Browne-Bartroli. He organized, armed and operated with units of the Free French Forces. His service in France during the invasion period were recognised by the award of the Distinguished Service Order (DSO) from Britain and the Croix de Guerre from France.

After the war, he was promoted to major and made commanding officer of the new Canadian Special Air Service Company. In 1947 there was an unusual episode in which he was tasked with the rescue of a severely injured missionary from a remote district in the Far North. The mission took seven weeks altogether (which suggests that Canon J.H. Turner was himself a pretty tough character!), and resulted in d'Artois being decorated with the George Medal (GM) alongside flying officer Robert Race.

He served with the Commonwealth occupation forces in Japan, and then did an operational tour with 1st Bn., Royal 22^{e} Régiment, the "Van Doos", during the Korean War.

== War time romance ==
One of the fellow students on his SOE course in 1943 had been a 19-year-old WAAF officer. Already having two years of service under her belt, she had then volunteered for SOE. She was also training for special operations and, like Guy, was parachuted into France before D-Day, though into a different district and 'Reseau', in the department of the Sarthe. She worked as a courier for Sydney Hudson's network (or Reseau), named 'Headmaster' on the edge of the Normandy Landings. The work was dangerous and she was arrested. However, she managed to maintain her cover and was released, surviving through to liberation by the advancing ground forces. This 20-year-old veteran was herself later decorated. When the couple had both returned to Britain on the successful completion of their separate missions, they were reunited and were quickly married. Assistant Section Officer Sonya Butt, MBE, war heroine, became Mrs. Sonia d'Artois and quietly disappeared from public view to become a wife and mother. Though not unique, by any means, this must have been one of the most distinguished romances of the war.

The couple moved to Quebec and raised a family of six children: three boys (Robert, Michel and Guy) and three girls (Nadya, Christina and Lorraine).

== Death ==
In March 1999, Major L.G. d'Artois, a hero in war and peace, died in the Veterans Hospital in Sainte-Anne-de-Bellevue, Quebec. He and his wife are buried at the National Field of Honour in Pointe Claire, Quebec, Canada.

== Bibliography ==
- "Canada at War: Mute Survivors". Time. 25 December 1944. Archived from the original on 15 December 2008.
- Depickere, Dave. "The People's War: Canadian Secret Agents". web.mac.com. Archived from the original on 29 October 2008.
- Horne, Bernd; Wyczynski, Michel (2001). In Search of Pegasus. St. Catharines: Vanwell Publishing.
- "Lionel Guy D'Artois". Canada Veterans Hall of Valour. Archived from the original on 27 August 2014.
- Neely, Alastair (8 August 2002). "First Special Service Force". execulink.com.
- Stevens, Colin (24 August 2008). "Canadian Army Regiments". bcoy1cpb.pacdat.net. Archived from the original on 2 February 2007.
- Stevens, Colin (24 August 2008). "FSSF". bcoy1cpb.pacdat.net. Archived from the original on 2 February 2007.
- Stevens, Colin (24 August 2008). "Canadian Airborne Units". bcoy1cpb.pacdat.net. Archived from the original on 2 February 2007.
