= Coulson Norman Mitchell =

Canadian soldier

Coulson Norman Mitchell VC MC
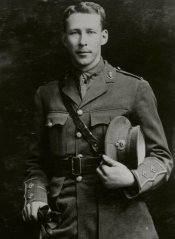
- Born: 11 December 1889; Winnipeg, Manitoba
- Died: 17 November 1978 (aged 88); Mount Royal, Quebec
- Burial place: National Field of Honour, Pointe Claire, Quebec
- Military career
- Allegiance: Canada
- Branch: Canadian Expeditionary Force
- Rank: Lieutenant colonel
- Units: Royal Canadian Engineers
- Conflicts: World War I World War II
- Awards: Victoria Cross; Military Cross

Coulson Norman Mitchell VC MC (11 December 1889 – 17 November 1978) was a Canadian soldier. Mitchell was a recipient of the Victoria Cross, the highest and most prestigious award for gallantry in the face of the enemy that can be awarded to British and Commonwealth forces.

== World War I ==
Born in Winnipeg on December 11, 1889, Mitchell was a graduate of the University of Manitoba in civil engineering. With the outbreak of the First World War he enlisted as a private in the Canadian Expeditionary Force in 1914 and went overseas with a railway construction unit. He was commissioned in the field as a temporary lieutenant. While serving with the 1st Tunnelling Company of Canadian Engineers he was awarded the Military Cross in 1917.

=== Victoria Cross ===
Mitchell was 28 years old, and a captain in the 4th Engineer Battalion, Canadian Engineers, 2nd Canadian Division in the Canadian Expeditionary Force, when the following deed took place for which he was awarded the Victoria Cross.

For most conspicuous bravery and devotion to duty on the night of 8–9 October 1918, at Canal de L'Escaut, north-east of Cambrai.

He led a small party ahead of the first wave of infantry in order to examine the various bridges on the line of approach and, if possible, to prevent their demolition.

On reaching the canal he found the bridge already blown up. Under a heavy barrage he crossed to the next bridge, where he cut a number of "lead" wires. Then in total darkness, and unaware of the position or strength of the enemy at the bridgehead, he dashed across the main bridge over the canal. This bridge was found to be heavily charged for demolition, and whilst Capt. Mitchell, assisted by his N.C.O., was cutting the wires, the enemy attempted to rush the bridge in order to blow the charges, whereupon he at once dashed to the assistance of his sentry, who had been wounded, killed three of the enemy, captured 12, and maintained the bridgehead until reinforced.

Then under heavy fire he continued his task of cutting wires and removing charges, which he well knew might at any moment have been fired by the enemy.

It was entirely due to his valour and decisive action that this important bridge across the canal was saved from destruction.

== World War II ==
After the war, Mitchell returned to Winnipeg to practice civil engineering. Early in World War II, he was assigned to the Royal Canadian Engineers (RCE), at Camp Borden, Ont. In 1940, he went overseas and was put in charge of replacement training. Transferred back to Canada in 1943, he was attached to National Defence Headquarters in Ottawa before joining the staff of the RCE Training Centre at Petawawa, Ont. In 1944, he took command of the Royal Canadian School of Military Engineering in Chilliwack, B.C. He later achieved the rank of lieutenant colonel.

== Later life and memorials ==
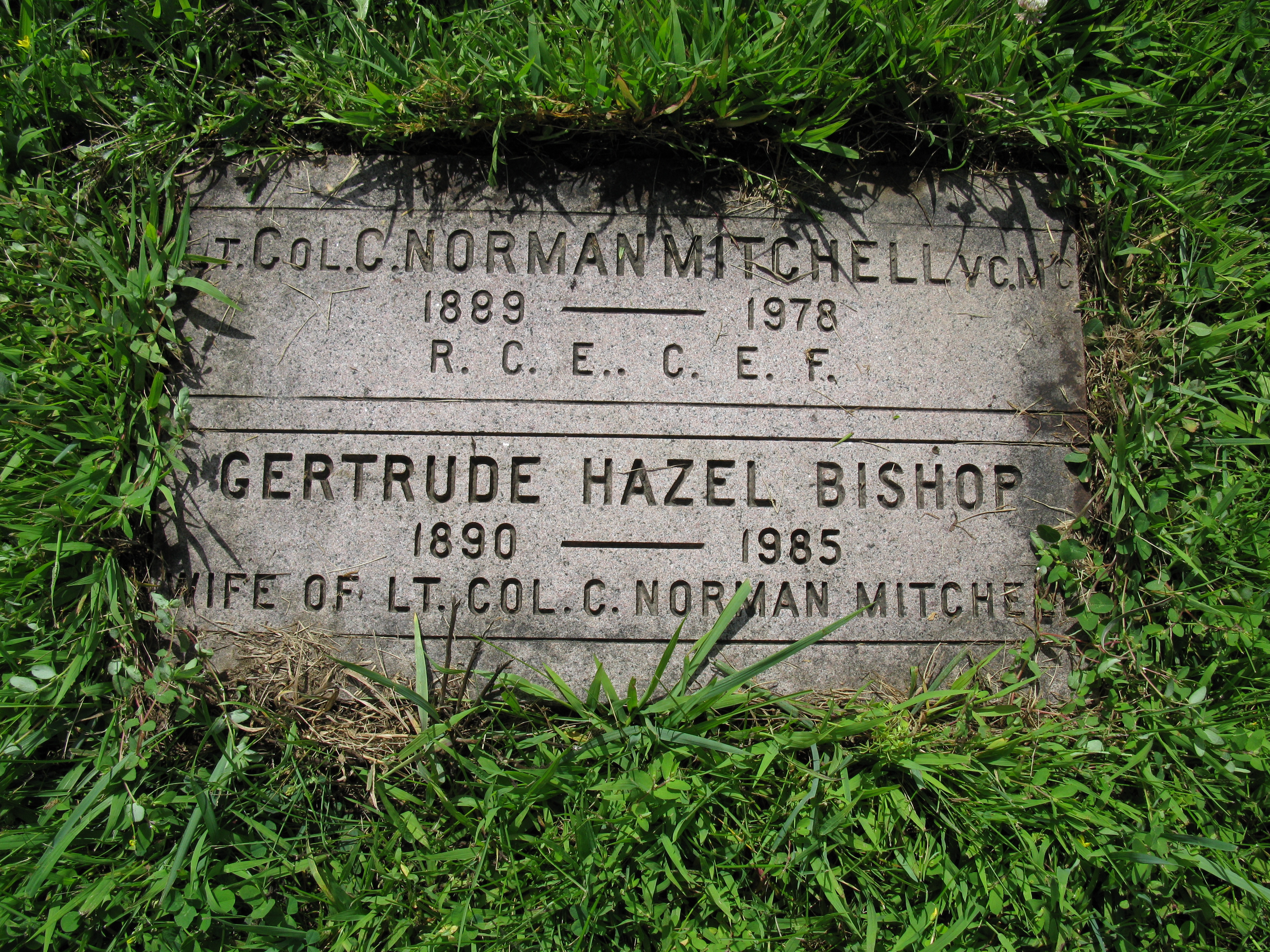
Coulson Norman Mitchell's headstone.

In 1946, Mitchell moved to Montreal where he joined an engineering firm in an executive capacity. In 1965, a Montreal branch of The Royal Canadian Legion was named after him. He died November 17, 1978, and was buried at the National Field of Honour in Pointe Claire, Quebec (Section M. Grave 3051).

The Canadian Military Engineers chose to honour Mitchell by naming the main building of the Canadian Forces School of Military Engineering at CFB Gagetown, New Brunswick, after him. His Victoria Cross is on display at the museum there.

A street in the town of Mount Royal is named after him. Mitchell Avenue, Mount Royal, Quebec. Coulson Mitchell Lake, named after him is located approximately 100 kilometres east of Thompson. The name of the lake is being modified to Norman Mitchell Lake at the request of the family to reflect that Lieutenant-colonel Mitchell was commonly referred to by the name "Norman".

== Honours ==

Ribbon	Description	Notes
	Victoria Cross (VC)	31 January 1919
	Military Cross (MC)	13 February 1917
	1914–15 Star	
	British War Medal	
	WWI Victory Medal	
	Defence Medal	
	Canadian Volunteer Service Medal	With Overseas Clasp
	War Medal	
	King George VI Coronation Medal	12 May 1937; Qualified as a Victoria Cross Recipient
	Queen Elizabeth II Coronation Medal	2 June 1953; Qualified as a Victoria Cross Recipient
	Canadian Centennial Medal	1 July 1967; Qualified as a Victoria Cross Recipient
	Queen Elizabeth II Silver Jubilee Medal	6 February 1977; Both British and Canadian Versions of this Medal; Qualified as a Victoria Cross Recipient
