= Sonya Butt =

British SOE officer & agent (1924–2014)

Sonya Butt MBE
- Sonya Butt and her husband Guy D'Artois
- Born: 14 May 1924; Eastchurch, Kent, England
- Died: 21 December 2014 (aged 90); Montreal, Canada
- Spouse: Guy D'Artois (m. 1945; died 1999)
- Children: 6
- Military career
- Allegiance: United Kingdom, Canada
- Branch: WAAF, SOE, FANY
- Service years: 1941–1944 (WAAF); 1943–1944 (SOE)
- Rank: Assistant Section Officer
- Nickname: Blanche
- Unit: Headmaster
- Awards: MBE, Mentioned in Dispatches

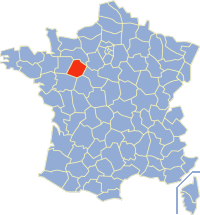
Butt and the Headmaster network were based in Sarthe Department.

Sonya Juliet Esmée Florence Butt MBE (14 May 1924 – 21 December 2014), also known as Sonia d'Artois, code named Blanche, was an agent of the clandestine Special Operations Executive during the Second World War. SOE agents allied themselves with groups resisting the occupation of their countries by Axis powers. The purpose of SOE was to conduct espionage, sabotage, and reconnaissance in occupied countries. The SOE supplied resistance groups with weapons and equipment parachuted in from England.

Butt worked as a courier for the Headmaster network of SOE. She was the youngest agent of either sex sent by the SOE to work in France.

== Early life ==
Sonya Butt was born in Eastchurch, Kent on 14 May 1924. Her father, L.A.K. Butt had been a member of the Royal Flying Corps and later became a senior officer of the Royal Air Force. Her mother was Ada Cordon, a French citizen. Ada separated from her husband and she and her two children moved to the south of France when Butt was three years old. With the onset of World War II in 1939, the family moved back to England, living in Woking.

== Service in the Women's Auxiliary Air Force ==
Butt was only a schoolgirl at the start of the war, and would not be due to join up for at least a couple of years. Her preference was for the Women's Auxiliary Air Force (WAAF), as her father had served in the RAF himself, but the minimum age join the WAAF was 17½. Butt joined up the very day she became eligible: 14 November 1941, becoming 454240 Aircraftwoman (ACW) Butt. She served in the Administrative Branch.

In 1941, women were banned from front-line service. In April 1942, however, this provision was changed and one of the first organisations to take advantage of this was the Special Operations Executive (SOE). SOE trained teams to operate 'behind the lines' in countries under Nazi occupation. The role of courier was particularly important, as movements around a district were likely to encounter German check-points, and a male of military or working age attracted adverse attention; a woman on a bicycle, however, was less likely to be suspected, and if she attracted attention at all, it was usually the sort that makes a besotted sentry forget to check papers and luggage properly. SOE began to look for potential female couriers, but the work was highly dangerous and required toughness mind and body to perform under such pressure, so SOE had to be very demanding, very selective and very secretive. It did not advertise its vacancies and recruited by 'the usual methods': word of mouth, and other quiet and roundabout means; a skill in the appropriate language was a good starting point.

Whilst working at RAF Gosforth (alongside another future SOE agent, Patricia O'Sullivan), Butt had been advertising her fluency in French in an attempt to get attached to the Free French squadrons and escape her dreary routine. She failed in this bid, but this did bring her to the attention of SOE, and she was soon accepted for training. She was given an honorary commission as an Assistant Section Officer.

== Special Operations Executive ==
Butt first applied to become a translator as she spoke impeccable and idiomatic French (and such speakers were rare among the English). That, plus her "energetic personality" persuaded SOE to train her as an agent. She was only nineteen years old when she joined the SOE on 11 December 1943.

Butt was described by her SOE instructors as having a "definite devil may care streak in her." During her training she fell in love with another trainee, Canadian Guy D'Artois (born 1917). The two were scheduled to work together in France, but when they were married near the end of their training, SOE decided they could not serve together. Butt initially said that she wouldn't go to France if she couldn't go with D'Artois, but relented and was assigned instead to work as a courier with the Headmaster network (also called a circuit and reseau) led by Sydney Hudson in the Le Mans region.

On 28 May 1944, only a few days before the D-Day invasion of France by Allied armies, Butt parachuted into Sarthe Department. She injured her shoulder on arrival. Her cover story was that she was an employee of the Louis Vuitton fashion house, recuperating from a serious illness in Le Mans; but the suitcase containing her designer clothing fell onto a road and was found by German soldiers. Plus, finding the suitcase revealed to the Germans that a female agent had parachuted into France in that region. Butt walked 18 km (11 miles) to a safe house near Le Mans to begin work.

Prudence would have dictated a low profile for Butt, but instead she initially chose to be flamboyant, flirting with German soldiers and eating in black market restaurants, beyond the means of normal French people. She became acquainted with the Gestapo chief in Le Mans. He later learned she was a British SOE agent and saluted her for her performance. Butt's apparent friendliness with the Germans would have consequences. After Le Mans was liberated by the Allied armies on 8 August, she was accused by townspeople of being a "horizontal collaborator" with the Germans and tied to a lamp post in preparation for having her head shaved. She was rescued by a resistance member who knew her.

After the Allied invasion and during its slow advance toward Le Mans, Butt delivered messages, cash, and supplies to scattered resistance organizations. Her travel was by bicycle. At night she assisted Hudson in coordinating sabotage operations to hinder the German effort to reinforce and supply its military forces contesting the Allied invasion. After one of the other agents (Francisque Eugene Bec) dropped with her was killed 16 June during a battle between the Maquis and the Germans, Butt took on the additional role of weapons instructor. She said she "filled in wherever there was need." Working closely with Hudson, the two slept in barns and haystacks, supplying and encouraging the resistance to harry the Germans and providing intelligence to the American army. The two became lovers. Hudson, who was also married, later said, "It was difficult not to fall in love with her. In June 1944, whilst delivering messages around the countryside, she was stopped by two Germans and detained for questioning. This was a very dangerous moment, but her cover story and false papers withstood the examination, and she was eventually released.

In late July, the Allied allies began a rapid advance through France and on 8 August liberated Le Mans from German control. Butt and Hudson went to work for the Americans crossing back and forth through the battle lines to gain intelligence. During this time, Butt was raped by two German soldiers. She was carrying papers for the American army in her girdle. She later told the story.

I heard this marching behind me and I turned around and there were these two guys so I just smiled at them and went on my way and they followed me and raped me. One held me down. My first instinct was to put up a fight and then I thought no, I can't. I've got these papers. If I put up a fight, they're going to overpower me and then they'll probably strip me and we'd be in a worse mess than we already are in. I've just got to let them do it and get on with it...Anyway, it was quite an experience! But they didn't get my papers! [laughs]

In October 1944, France having been liberated, Butt met up with her husband in Paris and returned to England. She had lost 40 lb (18 kg) during her four-plus months in France.

== Honours and awards ==
Her work and bravery were recognised with the award of the MBE and a Mention in Dispatches. She was still only 20 years old. She was made a Knight of the Order of the Legion of Honour (France) in 2007.

Order of the British Empire (Member)	1939–1945 Star	France and Germany Star	War Medal with Mentioned in Dispatches

== Postwar life ==
Much to the annoyance of her superiors, Butt left without signing off. After the war, Sonya and Guy went to live in Canada. Guy d'Artois had parachuted into another district of France about the same time as Butt. For the success of his mission, he was awarded the Distinguished Service Order and the Croix de Guerre. In 1947, he received another very senior decoration, the George Medal (GM) for his work in rescuing an injured missionary in northern Canada. After a tour in Japan, Guy served in the Korean War, before the couple settled down again in Canada. Guy and Sonia (an alternative spelling of her name) had six children, three boys and three girls. In Canada, she also used the name Toni D'Artois.

Butt's husband died at the Sainte-Anne-de-Bellevue Veterans hospital in March 1999. Sonya Butt died on 21 December 2014 at the age of 90. She was survived by the couple's six children. She was described, incorrectly, in her obituary of being the last surviving female British spy of the Second World War.

== See also ==
- Lilian Rolfe
