= Canadian Special Air Service Company =

- Active: 1947–September 1949
- Country: Canada
- Branch: Regular Army
- Type: Special forces
- Size: 140 men

Commanders
- Ceremonial chief: Major John Candy
- Notable commanders: Major Lionel Guy D'Artois

The Canadian Special Air Service Company was an airborne special forces unit in operation between 1947 and 1949.

== Role ==
As opposed to a purely military function, the Canadian SAS was originally given functions of airborne firefighting, search and rescue and aid to the civil powers. However, once officially sanctioned, the SAS was assigned the functions of being initially a parachute company but able to be the cadre of up to three parachute battalions, provide demonstrations of their capabilities throughout the nation, and "preserve and advance the techniques of SAS (Commando) operations developed during World War II".

The Canadian SAS Company performed an arctic rescue mission in 1947 and provided flood relief efforts in the Fraser Valley in 1948.

== Commander ==
Appointed as the Second-in-Command, but acting as the first and only Officer Commanding of the unit was Major Lionel Guy d'Artois, a savate instructor who served in World War II with the Royal 22nd Regiment, First Special Service Force and "F" Section of Special Operations Executive in France.

== Organisation ==
The company was formed as a standard infantry company with a company headquarters and three platoons; a fourth "services" platoon added in 1948. The unit had no distinctive insignia.

== Disbandment ==
The Canadian SAS Company carried on in its mission of providing the nucleus of an airborne battalion that became the Mobile Striking Force in 1949, replacing the SAS.

== See also ==
- Special Air Service, the elite unit of the British Army.
- First Special Service Force, an elite joint American-Canadian unit of the Second World War.
- Canadian Airborne Regiment, also an elite parachute unit of the Canadian Army later created and eventually disbanded.
