= National Indian Youth Council =

- Founded: August 10–13, 1961; Gallup, New Mexico
- Founders: Mel Thom (Walker River Paiute); Herb Blatchford (Diné); Shirley Hill Witt (Mohawk); Clyde Warrior (Ponca); Joan Noble (Ute); Bernadine Eschief (Shoshone-Bannock-Pima); Howard McKinley Jr. (Navajo); Edison Real Bird (Crow); Karen Rickard (Tuscarora); John R. Winchester (Pottawatomie); Viola Hatch (Arapaho)
- Type: 501 (c)(3) non-profit organization
- Location: New Mexico
- Website: www.niyc-alb.com

With the belief that we can serve a realistic need, the National Indian Youth Council dedicated its activities and projects to attaining a greater future for our Indian People.

— Mel Thom (Walker River Paiute), the NIYC's first president

The National Indian Youth Council (NIYC) is the second oldest American Indian organization in the United States with a membership of more than 15,000. It was the second independent native student organization, and one of the first native organizations to use direct action protests as a means to pursue its goals. During the 1960s, NIYC acted primarily as a civil rights organization. It was very active in the movement to preserve tribal fishing rights in the Northwest.

In the 1970s NIYC focused on environmental concerns and aided tribes suffering from the adverse effects of contamination from coal strip mining and uranium mining. The NIYC seeks to improve public education and job training for Native Americans, educate the general public about their issues, promote religious freedom, and increase political participation.

The Preamble to the NIYC's Constitution and Statement of Purpose reads:

Now therefore be it resolved, that the National Indian Youth Council endeavors to carry forward the policy of making their inherent sovereign rights known to all people, opposing termination of federal responsibility at all levels, seeking full participation and consent on jurisdiction matters involving Indians, and staunchly supporting the exercise of those basic rights guaranteed American Indians by the statutes of the United States of America.

== History ==
The National Indian Youth Council (NIYC) was established in 1961 by young American Indians who were either in college or had recently graduated. The NIYC formed following generational differences between attendees at the American Indian Chicago Conference in 1961 when several young American Indians, a handful of who had become acquainted while participating in the Southwest Regional Indian Youth Council, became disillusioned with the tribal leaders.[1]:53-54. After listening to the ideas presented by the conservative faction of the conference, the youth began to express dissenting opinions. This group, including Clyde Warrior (Ponca) and Mel Thom (Walker River Paiute), temporarily called themselves the Chicago Conference Youth Council.[1]:57. Later in the year, after that summer's Workshop on American Indian Affairs had ended, the group that began as the Chicago Conference Youth Council met in Gallup, New Mexico,[5] where they established the National Indian Youth Council. The NIYC is the second oldest national Indian organization and was influenced and aligned with the Civil Rights Movement.

Other members of the NIYC included Robert V. Dumont Jr. and Faith Smith, who were involved in political action and post-secondary education. While working at the Chicago American Indian Center (AIC), they helped form the Native American Committee (NAC). In the 1970s, the NAC would found the Little Big Horn School in 1971 in cooperation with Chicago Public Schools to address the needs of Native American high school students in the city, and then in 1973 the O-Wai-Ya-Wa program for elementary-level students. In 1974, Smith, Dumont, the NAC, and others founded the Native American Educational Services College (NAES College), the first urban institution of higher learning managed by and serving Native Americans. Smith served as president of the college until 2004.

== Goals ==
The goal of NIYC is to protect Indian treaty, hunting, and fishing rights. Mel Thom developed the following creed from which many ideas were drawn and used in the preamble of the NIYC's constitution:

At this time in the history of the American Indian, we, the younger generation, find it expedient to band together on a national scale in meeting the challenges facing our Indian people. In banding together for mutual assistance we recognize that the future of the Indian people will ultimately rest in the hands of the younger people, and that Indian youth need be concerned with the position of the American Indian. We further recognize the inherent strength of the American Indian heritage that will be enhanced by a national Indian organization. The needs of the American Indians to be served are numerous and varied. Besides needs there are contributions already made and more to be made to America by its original inhabitants. We believe in a greater Indian America.[1]:60

After the founding of the NIYC, the group decided to take the fight for Native American rights in a new direction and use direct action to solve problems. Direct actions included fish-ins and protest marches. This inspired other organizations to do the same, such as the American Indian Movement.[6]:2

=== Publications ===
In 1963, NIYC began publishing a monthly newsletter titled ABC: Americans Before Columbus. This was the first publication of the Red Power movement. The newsletter was one of the leading expressions of radical Indian thought. By 1962, over 180 tribal councils had subscribed.

== Red Power era ==
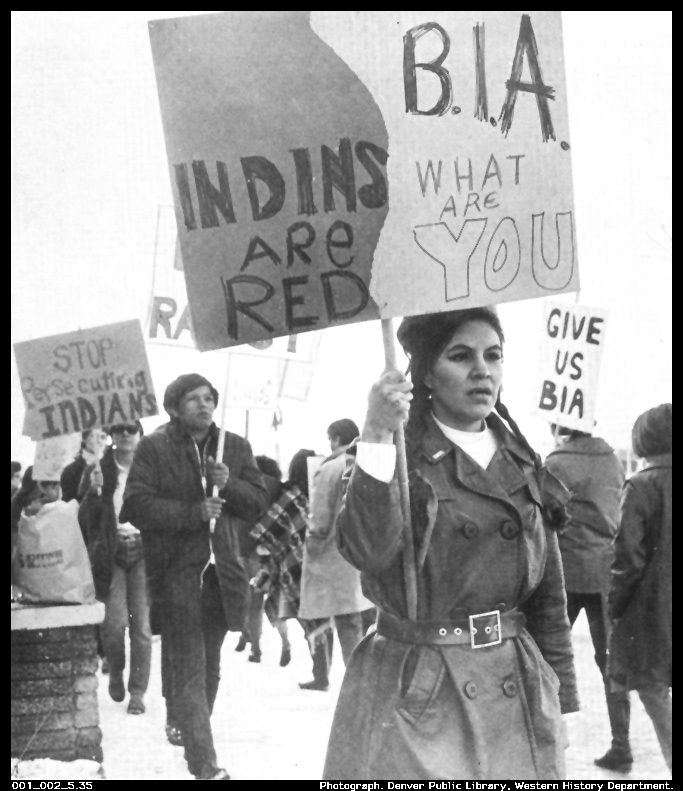
National Indian Youth Council demonstrations, Bureau of Indian Affairs office, Denver 1970

=== Fish-Ins ===
As soon as settlers began arriving to the Columbia River area, they began to challenge Indian tribes over fishing. During the 1800s, numerous regional tribes ceded quantities of land to the federal government and moved to reservations, but their treaties protected traditional fishing and hunting, both in terms of access to territories and in the means used. The Muckleshoot, Puyallup, Nisqually, and other tribes of the Pacific Northwest signed the Treaty of Point Elliot and the Treaty of Medicine Creek related to these issues. But, after WWII, residents of the area began to realize that pollution, logging, and the increasing population were negatively affecting the salmon runs. Conservation measures soon began, but the tribes wanted to maintain their fishing habits, which had not changed for generations. Sports and commercial fishermen thought the tribes should have to follow the same state laws and regulations as they did. The Washington State Sportsman's Council sided with the white fishers and supported the conservation effort.

The first arrest occurred in 1954. Robert Satiacum was arrested for gillnetting without a license and out of season. The case continued up to Washington's Supreme Court. It was eventually dropped, but had a lasting effect. the decision by lower courts suggested that the State had the jurisdiction to regulate Indian fishing. The conflict continued for the next few years and began to gather more publicity in 1964. In February, tribal leaders met with members of the NCAI and the NIYC. They decided to take action to protect treaty rights. How to protest became a topic of contention, because many feared their cause would become linked with the American Indian civil rights movement, which was occurring at the same time. Mel Thom said, "[T]his is an Indian treaty, not a civil rights issue". The NIYC and others felt that if their issue were equated with racial issues it would affect the outcome. The American Indian problem was a century's old battle of tribes with power related to their relations with the federal government, and they wanted it to remain within those terms.

Many of the tribes in Washington gave their support to the cause, as did some Seminole from Florida, Winnebago from Nebraska, Blackfoot from Montana, Shoshone from Wyoming, and Sioux (Lakota) from the Dakotas. Prominent American actor Marlon Brando joined the fish-in and was arrested on March 2, 1964, during a NIYC fish-in on the Puyallup River. Episcopal minister John Yaryan from San Francisco was also arrested. These demonstrations were called "fish-ins" for publicity purposes; the activists believed that the world would better understand the protests after seeing the connection to the sit-ins carried out by young blacks in the South in order to get service at lunch counters.

On March 3, 1964, a NIYC-planned protest occurred in Olympia, Washington. Somewhere between 1,500 and 5,000 people attended, making it the largest intertribal protest to date. Traditional dances were performed on the steps of the state capitol, organizers gave speeches, and in front of the governor's mansion, one group held a war dance. Clyde Warrior declared that the fish-in protesting was establishing "the beginning of a new era in the history of American Indians". In the end, the fish-ins of March 1964 did not bring about immediate change, but they attracted members of more than 45 tribes, helping build a pan-Native American movement. Many of NIYC's members called them the "greatest Indian victory of modern day".

The fish-ins continued well into the late 1960s. Finally, in 1974, the United States Supreme Court closed United States v. Washington to further review. The decision mandated that the treaty Indians had the right to catch 50% of Washington's harvestable fish.

=== Poor People's Campaign ===
The NIYC was involved with African-American civil rights organizations in the Poor People's Campaign during the late 1960s in Washington, D.C. In 1967, Martin Luther King Jr. and leaders of the Southern Christian Leadership Conference (SCLC) began to plan a mass demonstration of poor people to converge on the nation's capital to raise awareness of the need for jobs, housing, and medical care. Members from the National Congress of American Indians (NCAI), the NIYC, and other Native organizations met with King in March 1968. The NCAI and NIYC disagreed on how to approach the anti-poverty campaign; the NCAI decided against participating in the march. The NCAI wished to pursue their battles in the courts and with Congress, unlike the NIYC, which was ready to demonstrate.

The poor from all over the United States descended on Washington, D.C., in early May. More than 2,000 demonstrators were transported by car, bus, and train to Resurrection City, a shantytown in West Potomac Park. Over 200 Native people were involved.

The following is an excerpt from a statement made by Mel Thom on May 1, 1968, during a meeting with Secretary of State Dean Rusk: (It was written by members of the Workshop on American Indian Affairs and the NIYC)

We have joined the Poor People's Campaign because most of our families, tribes, and communities number among those suffering most in this country. We are not begging. We are demanding what is rightfully ours. This is no more than the right to have a decent life in our own communities. We need guaranteed jobs, guaranteed income, housing, schools, economic development, but most important- we want them on our own terms. Our chief spokesman in the federal government, the Department of Interior, has failed us. In fact it began failing us from its very beginning. The Interior Department began failing us because it was built upon and operates under a racist, immoral, paternalistic and colonialistic system. There is no way to improve upon racism, immorality and colonialism; it can only be done away with. The system and power structure serving Indian peoples is a sickness which has grown to epidemic proportions. The Indian system is sick. Paternalism is the virus and the secretary of the Interior is the carrier.

==== Trail of Broken Treaties ====
NIYC was one of several organizations that participated in the cross-country Trail of Broken Treaties Caravan, which was organized by the American Indian Movement (AIM). The Trail of Broken Treaties occurred from November 3 until November 9, 1972. It started as a caravan of cars from various reservations in the United States intending to reach Washington, D.C. It ended with a week-long occupation of the Bureau of Indian Affairs section of the Department of Interior headquarters. The goal of the Trail of Broken Treaties was to gain positive media attention to build support for tribal sovereignty and self-determination. It was one of the first times that American Indians united together.

== See also ==
- Native American Pan-Indian Organizations and Efforts
- Red Power
- Urban Indian
- Native American civil rights
