= Robert V. Dumont Jr. =

Native American organizer and education leader (1940–1997)

Robert Vaughn Dumont Jr.
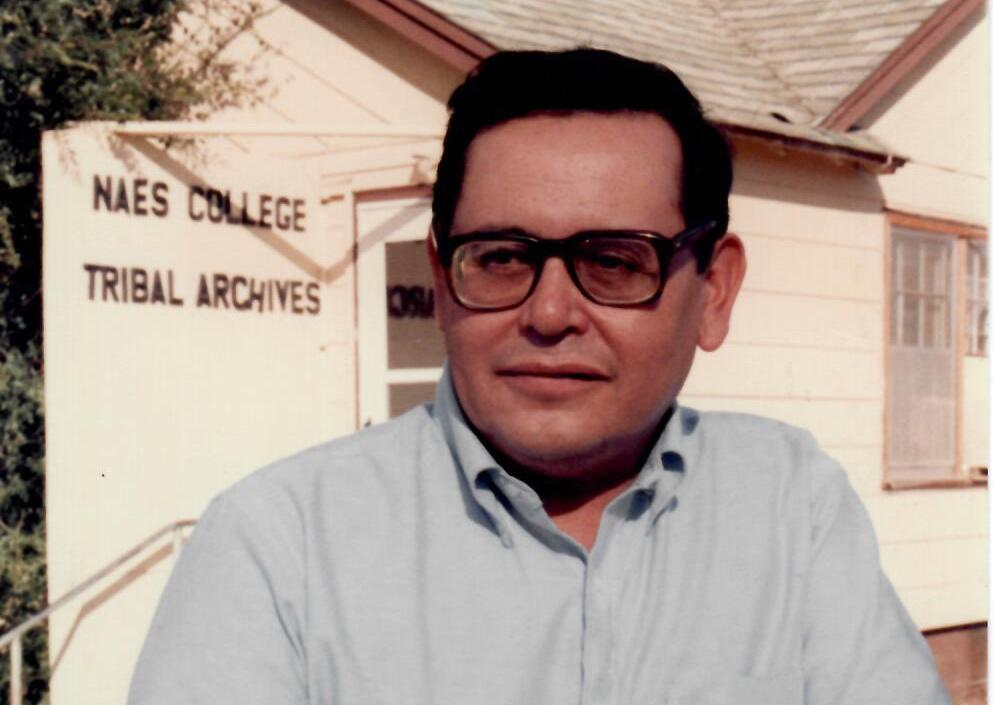
- Dumont in 1984
- Born: June 29, 1940; Poplar, Montana
- Died: May 1997 (Aged 56); Wolf Point, Montana, U.S.
- Citizenship: Assiniboine and Sioux Tribes of the Fort Peck Indian Reservation, United States
- Relatives: Nancy Dumont (sister)

Robert V. Dumont Jr. (1940–1997) was a Native American educational leader who lived in and worked in Chicago, Illinois and at the Fort Peck Indian Reservation in Montana, most notably as one of the designers of the Native American Educational Services College and its initial director of academic programs.

== Life and education ==
An Assiniboine citizen of the Assiniboine and Sioux Tribes of the Fort Peck Indian Reservation, Dumont grew up in the area of Wolf Point, Montana and graduated from Wolf Point Public Schools in 1958. For three months in 1961, he worked for the American Friends Service Committee, which had been instrumental in founding the Chicago American Indian Center in 1953, overseas in France and Poland. In 1962, he completed a Bachelor of Arts in English Literature at the University of Montana. In 1963–64, Dumont was a John Hay Whitney Fellow working in South Dakota at the Pine Ridge Reservation. He completed a master's degree in Education at Harvard in 1966 and relocated to Chicago.

== Career ==
Dumont become an active leader in the Chicago Native American community and was part of the second generation of Native American leaders of the city's American Indian Center, which had been established by Willard LaMere and others in 1953, with support from the American Friends Service Committee. He served on the AIC's education committee with his sister, Nancy Dumont, as well as Faith Smith. All three became founding members of the Native American Committee in 1970, an organization dedicated to creating educational institutions for and by Native Americans, which in due course became independent of the AIC.

In 1971, Dumont was coordinator of NAC's first major initiative, the Little Big Horn School, a collaboration with Chicago Public Schools designed to address needs of Native American high school students. With a federal grant of $244,000, five teachers at the Little Big Horn School taught eighty high school students and twenty preschool students. The NAC followed up the success in 1973 with the O-Wai-Ya-Wa Elementary School program. In 1974, NAC founded the Native American Educational Services College (NAES College), the first institution of higher learning designed by and for Native Americans. Dumont was part of the committee that drafted the original proposals and curriculum design for a degree-granting institution combining academic and tribal knowledges.

In the mid-1970s, as NAES College began to establish satellite locations on Native American reservations, Dumont returned to Montana to set up the NAES site on the Fort Peck Indian Reservation. He later worked for the Fort Peck Tribal Board.

== Legacy ==
The Robert Dumont Building at the Fort Peck Community College in Poplar, Montana is named for Dumont and houses classrooms, computer labs, faculty/staff offices, and telecommunications. His 1997 obituary in the Billings Gazette praised Dumont for having "challenged those around him to think, and to act in the best traditions and interests of Native people; not to accept failure as an end but as a beginning of new learning and a vision of dynamic social change for a Native peoples."

== See also ==
- Urban Indian
- Native American civil rights
- Red Power movement
