= Chicago Indian Village =

Chicago Native American housing advocacy group

- Abbreviation: CIV
- Predecessor: Native American Committee (NAC)
- Formation: 1970; 56 years ago
- Founder: Michael Chosa
- Founded at: Chicago, Illinois
- Dissolved: 1972
- Type: advocacy organization
- Purpose: Affordable Housing, Native American civil rights, Native American self-determination
- Location(s): Wrigleyville neighborhood, Chicago; Belmont Harbor Nike missile site, Des Plaines, Illinois; Big Bend Lake; Camp Seager (Naperville, Illinois) others
- Region served: US Midwest
- Services: Native American housing advocacy
- Methods: occupation, protest
- Key people: Michael Chosa, Carol Warrington

The Chicago Indian Village (CIV) was a short-lived American Indian affordable-housing protest group in and around Chicago, Illinois, in 1971–1972 that worked to raise awareness of and remedy poor living conditions for Native Americans in the Chicago area.

== Background ==
The US government's Indian termination policy and Indian Relocation Act of 1956 encouraged and incentivized Native Americans to relocate to urban centers, and by 1969 Chicago was one of seven American cities with more than 10,000 Native American citizens.

In 1953, Native American leaders established the American Indian Center (AIC) of Chicago to provide social services and opportunities, youth and senior programs, and cultural and educational programs. In the late 1960s and early 1970s, a group of Native Americans, including members of the AIC, formed the Native American Committee (NAC). They believed Chicago's Native American community in general and the AIC in particular should re-direct many of its resources from community building and social events to education, self-determination, and poverty alleviation. Leaders of the NAC included Steve Fastwolf, Mike Chosa, Bill Whitehead, Helen Whitehead, Dennis Harper, Judith Harper, Norma Stealer, as well as Faith Smith, an assistant to AIC executive director, Robert Rietz. Chosa had been a student of twentieth-century Chicago-based community activist and theorist Saul Alinsky, author of the 1971 book Rules for Radicals: A Pragmatic Primer.

== Wrigleyville Protest Camp ==
In early 1970, Menominee woman Carol Warrington, a mother of six, began a rent strike to pressure her landlord to improve the dilapidated conditions of her apartment. On May 5, 1970, her landlord evicted Warrington and her children from her apartment on a street adjacent to the Chicago Cubs home stadium, Wrigley Field. The NAC took up Warrington's cause. The AIC had in storage a large teepee that it had constructed for use at public celebrations and ceremonial events. Chosa borrowed the teepee, pitched it on an empty lot across the street from Warrington's apartment, and encouraged other Native Americans to join him. From this conspicuous location next to the baseball stadium, Chosa demanded justice for Warrington and better living conditions for the Native Americans. Students from nearby DePaul University donated two portable toilets and $300 cash. The media covering the protest dubbed it the "little Alcatraz Movement" because of the protest's resemblance to the ongoing (November 20, 1969 – June 11, 1971) Occupation of Alcatraz in San Francisco.

Within days, the protesting group split. Many followed Chosa's exhortation to continue the occupation camp near the stadium. Some—members of the AIC who had lent the teepee to the occupation—felt the occupation, having successfully raised awareness of the problem, should be wound down. Meanwhile, Steve Fastwolf led a group of NAC members out of the protest to return to the other, primarily educational, interests and goals of the NAC. Under Chosa's leadership, the remaining protestors adopted the name Chicago Indian Village (CIV).

== Other locations ==
In June 1971, Chosa led his followers to occupy some vacant acreage on Lake Michigan at Chicago's Belmont Harbor, previously the site of a battery of Nike anti-aircraft missiles. There, negotiating with the Federal Regional Council Task Force on Urban Indians and the Office of Economic Opportunity (OEO), they demanded that the Belmont Harbor site be set aside for 200 housing units for Native Americans as well as for a school for 500 Native American children. The Chicago police evicted the protesters after two weeks on July 1, 1971. Clyde Bellecourt (White Earth Ojibwe), co-founder of the American Indian Movement (AIM), visited the CIV site at Belmont Harbor with six other AIM members from Minneapolis but left citing the high consumption of alcohol among some of those there. In the year that followed as negotiations continued, the group camped at various locations including Big Bend Lake in Des Plaines, Illinois, and a second decommissioned Nike missile site near the Argonne National Laboratory.

Eventually, an assistant to John N. Erlenborn, a member of the US House of Representatives for Illinois's 14th congressional district, named Joanne Maxwell, found the group lodging at Camp Seager, a summer camp facility of the United Methodist Church near Naperville, Illinois, until a final settlement was reached, problematic because the cabins there had not been constructed for use in winter. By the summer of 1972, with their numbers and momentum greatly reduced, however, the group disbanded.

== Outcomes ==
While the CIV did not last beyond the summer of 1972, it achieved a number of ends:

- The group put sufficient pressure on the Chicago office of the Federal Regional Council Task Force on Urban Indians and the Office of Economic Opportunity (OEO) to create a task force to try to meet some of the Native Americans’ needs and demands
- CIV was guaranteed a place at the table with the OEO and the Federal Regional Council to discuss possible solutions
- CIV won temporary lodging at Camp Seager, a Methodist Summer Camp in Naperville, Illinois, emergency services to the camp, and a commitment to the building of 132 units of public housing for Native Americans in the city of Chicago as well as the construction of a cultural center

Nevertheless, the OEO and Federal Regional Council's commitments were contingent upon numerous prerequisites by the CIV members as well as related city agencies. These prerequisites were not met, and CIV dispersed.

== See also ==
- Urban Indian
- Native American civil rights
- Red Power movement
