= Native American Educational Services College =

Higher education institution based in Chicago

Native American Educational Services (NAES) College
- Type: Private
- Established: 1974
- Location: Chicago, Illinois, US
- Campus: Urban
- Website: naes.info

The Native American Educational Services College (NAES College) was an institution of higher education led by and serving Native Americans. It offered a BA in public policy within a curriculum that combined academic and tribal knowledge from 1974 to 2005. Its main campus was in Chicago, Illinois, but also grew to include satellite locations in Minneapolis, Minnesota, and on reservations in Montana, Wisconsin, and New Mexico.

== Background ==
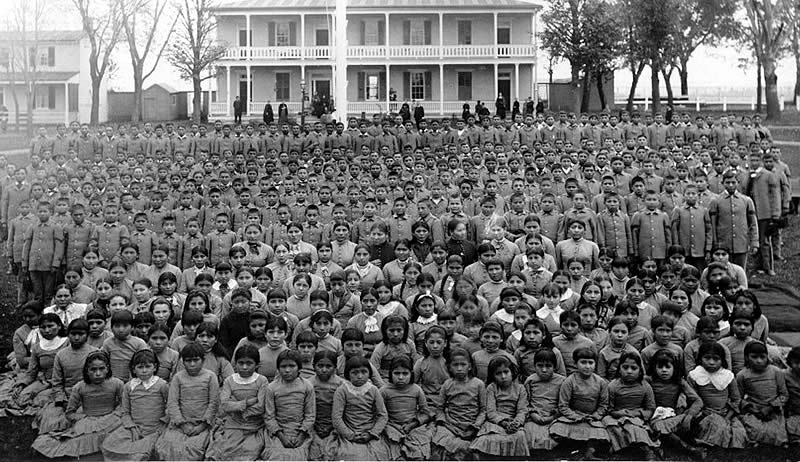
Students at Carlisle Indian Industrial School in Pennsylvania (c. 1900)

In 1926, the US Secretary of the Interior commissioned a review of Native American affairs to be conducted by the Institute for Government Research (founded in 1916 and later renamed the Brookings Institution) and financed by the Rockefeller Foundation. The scope of the survey included the “educational, industrial, social, and medical activities of the BIA Bureau of Indian Affairs, as well as with Indian property rights and economic conditions" on the majority of reservations in the US. The final document, The Problem of Indian Administration (often referred to as the Meriam Report or Meriam Survey), was delivered in 1928 and painted a highly critical picture of the primary education delivered to Native American children at the time, stating that the survey team was: "obligated to say frankly and unequivocally that the provisions for the care of the Indian children in boarding schools are grossly inadequate." The report strongly recommended both more and better education as well as a curriculum based on the goal of integrating Native American children into mainstream culture.

Starting in 1953, the US Congress set a new policy toward Native American citizens, the Indian termination policy, whose goal was the phasing out of governmental support for Native American tribes and the discontinuation of the protected trust status of Indian-owned land. Thereafter, the Bureau of Indian Affairs (BIA) initiated a program to encourage and incentivize Native Americans voluntarily to leave their reservations and move to metropolitan areas like Chicago, Denver, and Seattle, which resulted in an influx of Native Americans in those and other American cities. The Relocation Act facilitated that transition.

In 1961, Native American organizers involved in helping Native Americans settle in urban areas, including among others the National Congress of American Indians, D'Arcy McNickle, Willard LaMere, and anthropologists Sol Tax and Nancy Oestreich Lurie, held the American Indian Chicago Conference. One goal of the landmark meeting was the creation of a Declaration of Indian Purpose, the first major, collective statement on tribal self-determination. On the subject of education, the Declaration noted that situation was hardly better than that described by the writers of the 1928 Meriam Report. The Declaration suggested significant interventions to improve the quality and availability of primary, secondary, and adult education open to Native Americans. The survey reported high numbers of Native American students dropping out before secondary education, while many with the potential to succeed at college were channeled into vocational training programs. The Declaration also suggested the Native Americans should have choices in the selection of their education, but cultural assimilation was no longer listed as a goal.

In 1969, the Native American Committee formed as an activist group, meeting at Chicago's American Indian Center (AIC), its initial impetus being to support the Occupation of Alcatraz. Many of its members, were also members of an American Indian community wide education committee. These committees formed a new Native led nonprofit, named the Native American Committee, founded in 1970. In the early 1970s, a number of additional initiatives related to Native American education and self-determination began in Chicago. These included Little Big Horn High School established in 1971 and O-Wai-Ya-Wa Elementary School established in 1973, both operating as part of Chicago Public Schools in Chicago's Uptown neighborhood. Also in 1971, the University of Illinois at Chicago established a Native American Studies program under the leadership of Matthew War Bonnet, and in 1973 Chicago's Newberry Library established its Center for the History of the American Indian.

In 1973, Native American Committee members William Whitehead, Dennis Harper, and Robert Dumont developed the initial plans for a "systematic and sustained method by which Native students could receive a baccalaureate degree in both academic and tribal knowledge while also being trained for a variety of professions as they continued on to leadership roles in Native communities." Led by a non-profit board that including many NAC members including William Crazy Thunder, Faith Smith, Dennis Harper, Nancy Dumont, and Robert Dumont, the NAES college opened its doors in 1974 as an affiliate of Antioch College.

== Active period ==
NAES offered its first class in April 1975. The course was "Dynamics of Community Health." It was taught by Edith Johns, a registered nurse, and covered topics such as Indian health care, child development, and patients rights. The course took place on the second floor of the Native American Committee's offices on Hermitage Avenue in Chicago.

In a 1993 interview in the Chicago Tribune, NAES College president Faith Smith recalled that the first students were "11 people to agree to be in the first class of students. Most of them were in their late 30s and 40s. One man was in his late 50s. People had a lot of respect for him, so his coming into the class was important." Over time, most NAES students were professionals and paraprofessionals in Native American organizations rather than recent high-school graduates. NAES envisioned its programs as "a validation of the knowledge and skills its students had accumulated during years of work in Native American organizations".

In the years after the establishment of the Chicago campus, locations were founded in Minneapolis–Saint Paul, on the Menominee Indian Reservation in Wisconsin, and on the Fort Peck Indian Reservation in Montana.

NAES became a fully accredited institution of higher learning in 1984. Some years of financial struggles came to a head in the early 2000s, and the North Central Association of Colleges and Schools withdrew the school's accreditation in 2005. Dorene P. Wiese, Ed.D., became the president of NAES in 2005.

== Today ==
After the college lost its accreditation, the American Indian Association of Illinois facilitated an affiliation between NAES and Eastern Illinois University, for the first five years as NAES College and then for the second five years, under the name Medicine Shield College Program. Continuing to address many of the concerns and goals identified in the 1961 Declaration of Indian Purpose, the program provides "advising, financial aid assistance, college planning, tutoring, and many other services" for Native American students. This MOU agreement ended in 2015, after 40 students received BA degrees from EIU. The NAES library and archives continue collaborating with the University of Chicago library, which holds many of the NAES documents, and the Newberry Library, which utilized the NAES archives and President Wiese's expertise in its Indigenous Chicago oral history program of 2022–2–24. In 2020, NAES and AIAI collaborated as the NAES College Digital Library Project, which is an initiative to begin the digitization of NAES archive materials. This group included NAES, the American Indian Association of Illinois, Northwestern University Library, and Northwestern University's Center for Native American and Indigenous Research. NAES and the American Indian Association of Illinois share space today within Ebenezer Lutheran Church, 1650 W. Foster, Chicago, IL.

== See also ==
- Urban Indian
