= Native American Committee =

Chicago Native American education and advocacy organization

- Abbreviation: NAC
- Predecessor: Native American Committee of the American Indian Center of Chicago
- Formation: 1970; 56 years ago
- Founded at: Chicago, Illinois
- Dissolved: 1986
- Type: educational organization
- Legal status: defunct
- Purpose: education, Native American civil rights, Native American self-determination
- Region served: US Midwest
- Key people: Faith Smith
- Main organ: Red Letter
- Secessions: Chicago Indian Village

The Native American Committee (NAC) was an educational group in Chicago, Illinois, that created life-long learning programs and institutions for Native Americans. It was most notable for founding the Native American Educational Services College, the only institution of higher learning in an urban setting led by and serving Native Americans.

== History ==
In the mid twentieth century, the Native American population of Chicago grew as a results of the US government's Indian termination policy and Indian Relocation Act of 1956, which incentivized Native Americans to relocated to urban centers. By 1969 Chicago was one of seven American cities with more than 10,000 Native American citizens. In 1953, the Native American population founded the American Indian Center (AIC) of Chicago to provide social services and opportunities, youth and senior programs, and cultural and educational programs for the growing native population.

In 1969, a group took shape within the AIC inspired by and to support the Occupation of Alcatraz, the two-year protest occupation of Alcatraz Island by Native Americans. Taking the name Native American Committee (NAC), the group wanted the AIC both to establish more institutional and expansive educational offerings and to use more confrontational, direct-action tactics. Founding NAC members included Dennis Harper, Robert V. Dumont, Jr., William Whitehead, Nancy Dumont, Verdaine Farmilant, and Faith Smith, an assistant to long-time AIC director Robert Rietz. In 1991, Faith Smith described the cultural divide that had formed within the AIC as herself and others wanting to re-focus AIC on "poverty and the problems of Indians on the streets," while many of the existing members continued to feel that “the center ought to be more of a middle-classy sort of thing, a social center or that sort of stuff." NAC member Helen Whitehead (Ho-Chunk-Ojibwe) described NAC's goal for Native American students as starting “at the time they're very young and to build a positive self-image."

== Break-up ==
In 1970, NAC incorporated as an independent organization in Illinois, although many members continued also to work at or belong to the AIC.

The same year, a Native American housing protest began near Chicago Cubs home stadium, Wrigley Field, when a Menominee woman, Carol Warrington, a mother of six, began a rent strike for repairs to her apartment. On May 5, 1970, her landlord evicted Warrington's family, and the NAC mounted a public protest. Borrowing a ceremonial teepee from the AIC, NAC activists took up residence next to the baseball stadium and successfully drew attention to Warrington's cause and to the poor living conditions for many Native American Chicagoans. The NAC protest group soon split. Many AIC members urged the group to consider the short protest a success and end it. A core group of NAC members led by Steve Fastwolf left the group to re-focus on its educational mission. Michael Chosa led the remaining campers out of NAC under the new name Chicago Indian Village (CIV) in a protest that continued in various locations until 1972.

== Educational programs ==
In 1971, NAC successfully founded its first major initiative, the Little Big Horn School. A collaboration with Chicago Public Schools, the high school addressed the needs of Native American high school students. With a federal grant of $244,000, five teachers at the Little Big Horn School taught eighty high school students and twenty preschool students. The NAC followed up the success in 1973 with the O-Wai-Ya-Wa Elementary School program. In 1974, Smith and NAC founded and Smith became the president of the Native American Educational Services College (NAES College), the only urban institution of higher learning managed by and serving Native Americans. The college graduated more than three hundred students before discontinuing classes in 2005.

== See also ==
- American Indian Center
- Chicago Indian Village
- Native American civil rights
- Red Power movement
- Urban Indian
