= Sol Tax =

American anthropologist

- Born: 30 October 1907; Milwaukee, Wisconsin, U.S.
- Died: 4 January 1995 (aged 87)
- Education: University of Wisconsin (Ph.B, 1931); University of Chicago (Ph.D, 1935)
- Known for: Meskwaki people
- Awards: Viking Fund Medal (1961); Bronislaw Malinowski Award (1977)
- Scientific career
- Fields: anthropology

Sol Tax (30 October 1907 – 4 January 1995) was an American anthropologist. He is best known for creating action anthropology and his studies of the Meskwaki, or Fox Indians, for "action-anthropological" research titled the Fox Project, and for founding the academic journal Current Anthropology. He received his doctorate from the University of Chicago in 1935 and, together with Fred Eggan, was a student of Alfred Radcliffe-Brown.

== Early life ==
Tax grew up in Milwaukee, Wisconsin. During his formative years he was involved in a number of social clubs. Among these was the Newsboys Republic with which his first encounter was when he was "arrested" for breaking their rules. Tax began his undergraduate education at the University of Chicago but had to leave for lack of funds. He returned to school at the University of Wisconsin–Madison, where he studied with Ralph Linton. He later earned a doctorate at the University of Chicago in 1935. He joined the faculty of that institution in 1940 where he spent several decades teaching. Tax was a mentor to noted anthropologist Joan Ablon at the University of Chicago.

== Career ==
He was the main organizer for the 1959 Darwin Centennial Celebration held at the University of Chicago. He was an organizer, along with the National Congress of American Indians, including Native American organizer Willard LaMere, of the 1961 American Indian Chicago Conference. He assisted in authoring the resulting Statement of Indian Purpose, the first major statement of the policy of tribal self-determination.

=== University of Chicago ===
Tax intermittently served as Chair of the Department of Anthropology along with Robert Redfield after the retirement of Fay-Cooper Cole in the late 1940s. Cole had built up the Archaeology Laboratory Skeletal Collection, which began during the earliest iterations of the department in the late 1890s through the 1940s. The collection of human remains of both Indigenous and non-Indigenous people, bone fragments, and artifacts were compiled, studied, stored, and possibly exhibited on the campus. The skeletal collection contained human remains and archaeological objects taken and collected by faculty, students, curators, and donors through excavations of Illinois burial mounds such as the Fisher Mounds, Starved Rock, Kincaid, Algeria, Globe, Arizona, among materials from private donors. The collection also contained human remains from the University's Anatomy Department and Medical School. Donations accounted for a significant portion of the collection. Skeletal remains of 400 Indigenous people, as well as 10,000 bone fragments, stone, pottery and shell implements and artifacts largely excavated from Fisher and Adler Mounds, were donated in 1930 by George Langford, an engineer from Joliet who as also an amateur anthropologist, an honorary Research Associate in the Department of Anthropology at the University of Chicago, and later Curator of Plant Fossils at Field Museum.

The politics of the department had changed with the faculty body, and Redfield and Tax determined that the Skeletal Collection no longer served the research purposes of the department, and the storage space could be better used. They tasked a graduate student in the department to inventory and report on the collection. Around 1950, much of the skeletal collection was unofficially dispersed to other institutions like Indiana University, Illinois State Museum, Beloit College, and the Field Museum. Under NAGPRA guidelines, these institutions are now responsible for deaccessioning and repatriating Native American human remains and funerary objects. The remaining skeletal materials do not account for extent of the historical collection; the department's report recommended that the majority be "dumped."

The contemporary University of Chicago Archaeology Laboratory continues to hold non-Native American human remains, the paleoanthropology laboratory contains a large osteology collection.

== Honors ==
The American Anthropological Association presented to him and Bela Maday its Franz Boas award for exemplary service to anthropology in 1977. He was the association's president in 1959.

== Action Anthropology ==
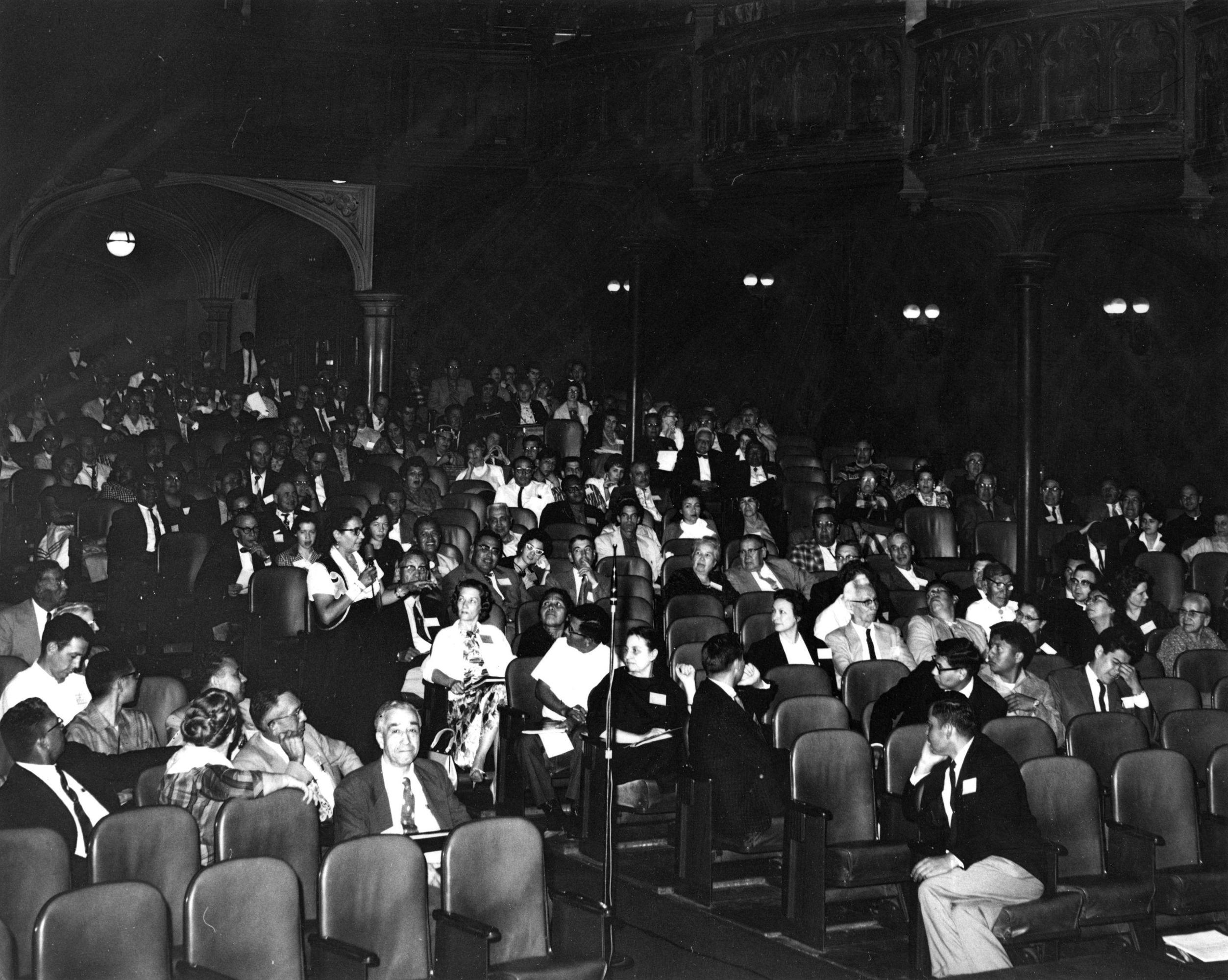
An example of Action Anthropology: the 1961 American Indian Chicago Conference (AICC) at the University of Chicago. Tax helped bring together members of 90 tribes. Photo by F. Peter Weil, courtesy of the NAES College Collection at the Northwestern University Libraries

Sol Tax is known as a founder of "Action Anthropology", a school of anthropological thought that forwent the traditional doctrine of non-interference in favor of co-equal goals of "learning and helping" from studied cultures. As an example, he was a lead organizer of the influential 1961 American Indian Chicago Conference (AICC). The meeting brought together 460 American Indians from 90 tribes from June 13 to June 20, 1961, at the University of Chicago to help "all Indians of the whole nation to express their own views" and draft a shared "Declaration of Indian Purpose." President John F. Kennedy received the declaration in a ceremony at the White House in 1962. The spirit of self-determination expressed in the document became a cornerstone of Native activism in the years that followed, including the Red Power movement and the expansion of Native American gaming.

In 1974, when the Chicago Native American Committee established the Native American Educational Services College (NAES College), Tax served on its original academic review committee. As the college grew, the academic review committee was converted into a board of directors in 1978. Tax accepted an invitation to join, and he served on the committee until 1993, not long before his death. NAES credited Tax with playing a "key role in helping define a vision of Indian higher education as the basis for community development in culturally relevant terms." Tax's particular contribution was the core idea of field projects in the NAES curriculum.

== Works ==
- (1937, revised 1955) contributions to Social Anthropology of North American Tribes, ed. by Fred Eggan. Chicago: University of Chicago Press.
- Rubinstein, Robert A., ed. 2001. Doing Fieldwork: The Correspondence of Robert Redfield and Sol Tax, New Brunswick, NJ: Transaction Books.
- (1953, revised 1972) Penny Capitalism; a Guatemalan Indian economy ISBN 978-0-374-97785-6. Tax is said to have coined the term 'Penny capitalism'.
- (1988) Pride and Puzzlement: A Retro-introspective Record of 60 Years of Anthropology Annual Review of Anthropology

== See also ==
- Bronislaw Malinowski Award
- Sol Tax Distinguished Service Award
