= Willard LaMere =

Native American organizer and education leader

Willard Earl LaMere
- Born: July 1, 1918; Winnebago, Nebraska, U.S.
- Died: November 29, 1990 (aged 72); Oneida, Wisconsin, U.S.
- Burial place: Latter Day Saints Cemetery, Chicago Corners, Wisconsin, U.S.
- Citizenship: Ho-Chunk
- Spouse: Rosaline
- Parents: Oliver Conąkehųka F. LaMere (father); Emma (Rave) LaMere (mother)

Willard Earl LaMere (1918 – November 29, 1990) was a Native American community organizer and educational leader in Chicago, Illinois in the mid twentieth century, a period when the US government's Indian termination policy encouraged Native Americans to assimilate into mainstream American society. Working to preserve Native American culture and values as Native Americans moved from reservations to cities, LaMere was instrumental in founding, among other organizations, the Native American Educational Services College, which became the first higher education institution in an urban setting managed by and serving Native Americans. He was also the college's first graduate.

== American Indian Center (AIC) ==
A member of the Ho-Chunk nation, LaMere moved to Chicago in 1937 and became well-respected leader in Chicago's American Indian community. In the early 1950s, Kurt Dreifus of the Bureau of Indian Affairs (BIA) in Chicago convened a meeting of concerned “businessmen, university professors, welfare agency officers, clergymen, etc.” as a Citizens Advisory Board to the BIA. The board’s mission was to study the needs of the growing and diverse Native American populations in the city of Chicago. LaMere, who was executive director of the Chicago branch of the Quaker-affiliated American Friends Service Committee (AFSC), attended and became "particularly instrumental" in the creation of a new service organization. Patterning their effort on a similar center opened in Los Angeles by AFSC, Willard took the lead in fundraising. The American Indian Center (AIC) opened at the corner of La Salle and Kinzie streets in September 1953. The Center provided a variety of activities including social gatherings every Saturday, holiday meals, periodic pow-wows, and a dance club that performed around the region. The Center also organized Native American participation in Chicago parades and other city events. Today, the AIC remains the primary cultural and community resource for the more than 65,000 Native Americans in the Chicago area.

== American Indian Chicago Conference (AICC) ==
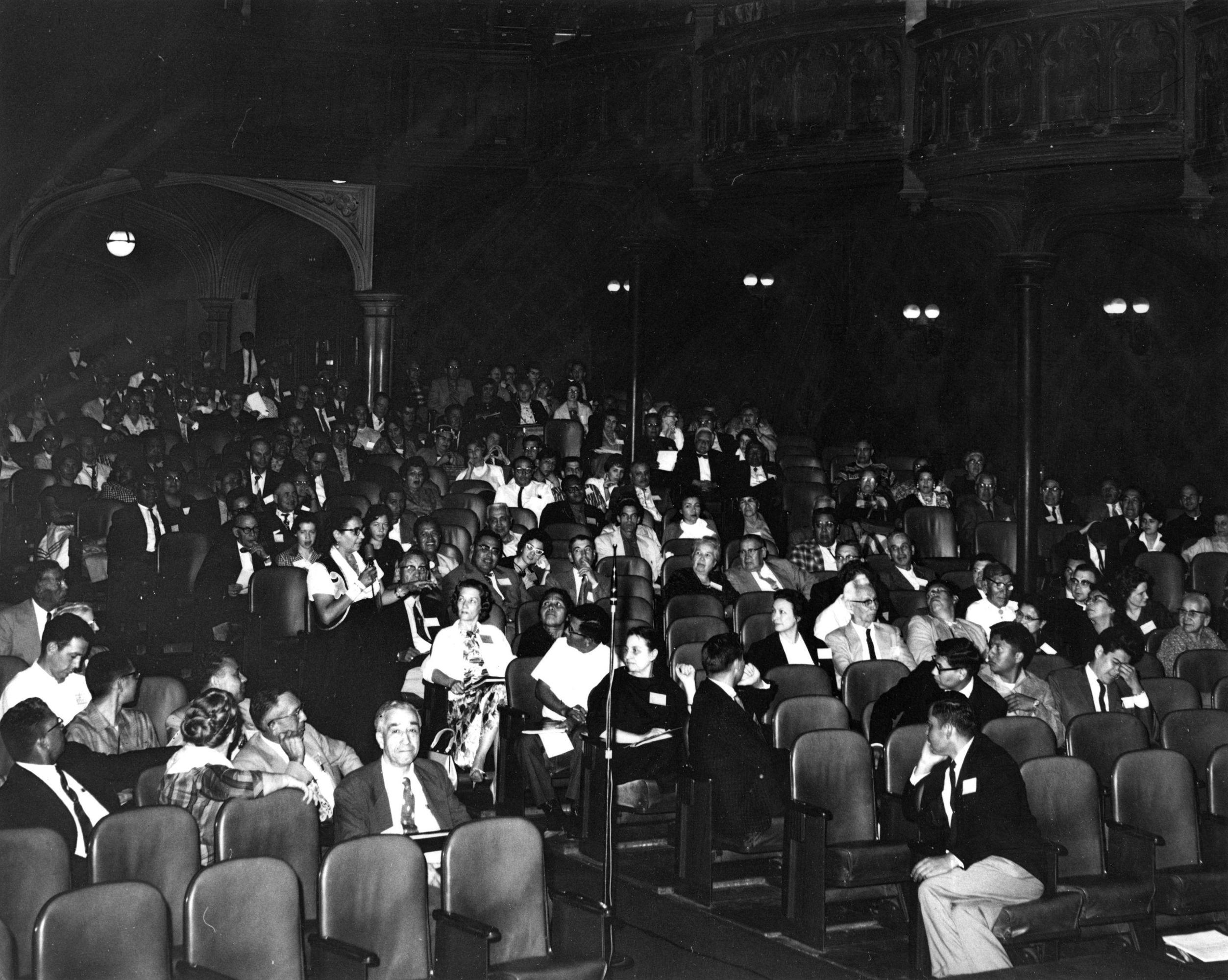
The 1961 American Indian Chicago Conference (AICC) at the University of Chicago. Members from 90 tribes wrote a shared "Declaration of Indian Purpose." Photo by F. Peter Weil, courtesy of the NAES College Collection at the Northwestern University Libraries

LaMere was among the lead organizers of the influential 1961 American Indian Chicago Conference (AICC). He helped bring together 460 American Indians from 90 tribes from June 13 to June 20, 1961. A second convener of the event, University of Chicago anthropologist Sol Tax, the founder of "action anthropology," described the purpose of the event as helping "all Indians of the whole nation to express their own views" and to create if possible a shared "Declaration of Indian Purpose." Representatives from the conference formally presented the declaration to President John F. Kennedy in a ceremony at the White House in 1962. The spirit of self-determination expressed in the document was a cornerstone of Native activism in the years that followed, including the Red Power movement and the expansion of Native American gaming.

== Other ==
In 1979, LaMere founded Chicago's American Indian Business Association of the Midwest. Chicago's Indian Council Fire organization honored LaMere with this 1988 Indian Achievement of the Year Award.

== See also ==
- Urban Indian
- Native American civil rights
- Red Power movement
