= Intertribal Friendship House =

- Founded: 1955
- Type: Non-profit cultural organization
- Location: 523 International Boulevard Oakland, CA 94606
- Coordinates: 37.795229°N 122.253435°W
- Region served: San Francisco Bay Area
- Services: Social services, education, cultural programming
- Key people: Sophia Taula-Lieras, Iona Mad Plume, Janet King, Bonney Hartley, Maria Garcia, Vida Castaneda, Mindy Woolbert
- Website: www.ifhurbanrez.org

The Intertribal Friendship House (IFH) of Oakland is one of the oldest Native American-focused urban resource and community organizations in the United States. Founded in 1955, IFH was created by local residents, similarly to American Indian Center in Chicago. Beginning in 1952, the United States Bureau of Indian Affairs (BIA) supported a plan to relocate Native Americans to urban areas, further encouraged by the Indian Relocation Act of 1956. The IFH served as a hub for Native American activism in the Bay Area throughout the 20th century. Millie Ketcheschawno became the IFH's first woman president in the 1970s after deep involvement with the Occupation of Alcatraz.

The IFH continues to offer educational activities, elder and youth programs, holiday meals, counseling for social services, space for community meetings, conferences, receptions, memorials, and family affairs. According to author Ed Vulliamy, 90% of Native Americans in California, "of which the majority are not indigenous California tribes," currently "live in cities."

== Related Groups ==
Organizations and institutions, especially of the San Francisco Bay Area that at some point were or are currently related to or affiliated with IFH include:

- Native American Health Center
- American Indian Child Resource Center
- United Indian Nations
- Indigenous Nations Child and Family Agency
- San Francisco Indian Center
- Friendship House Association of American Indians: An inpatient substance abuse treatment center in San Francisco. Former board member "[Peter] Bratt, whose mother is indigenous Peruvian, explained that 'today most of our clients are from California tribes.' "
- California Indian Legal Services
- American Indian Film Institute
- American Indian AIDS Institute of San Francisco

== See also ==
- American Indian Center
- International Indian Treaty Council
- American Indian Public Charter School
