= Gender relations in Guatemala =

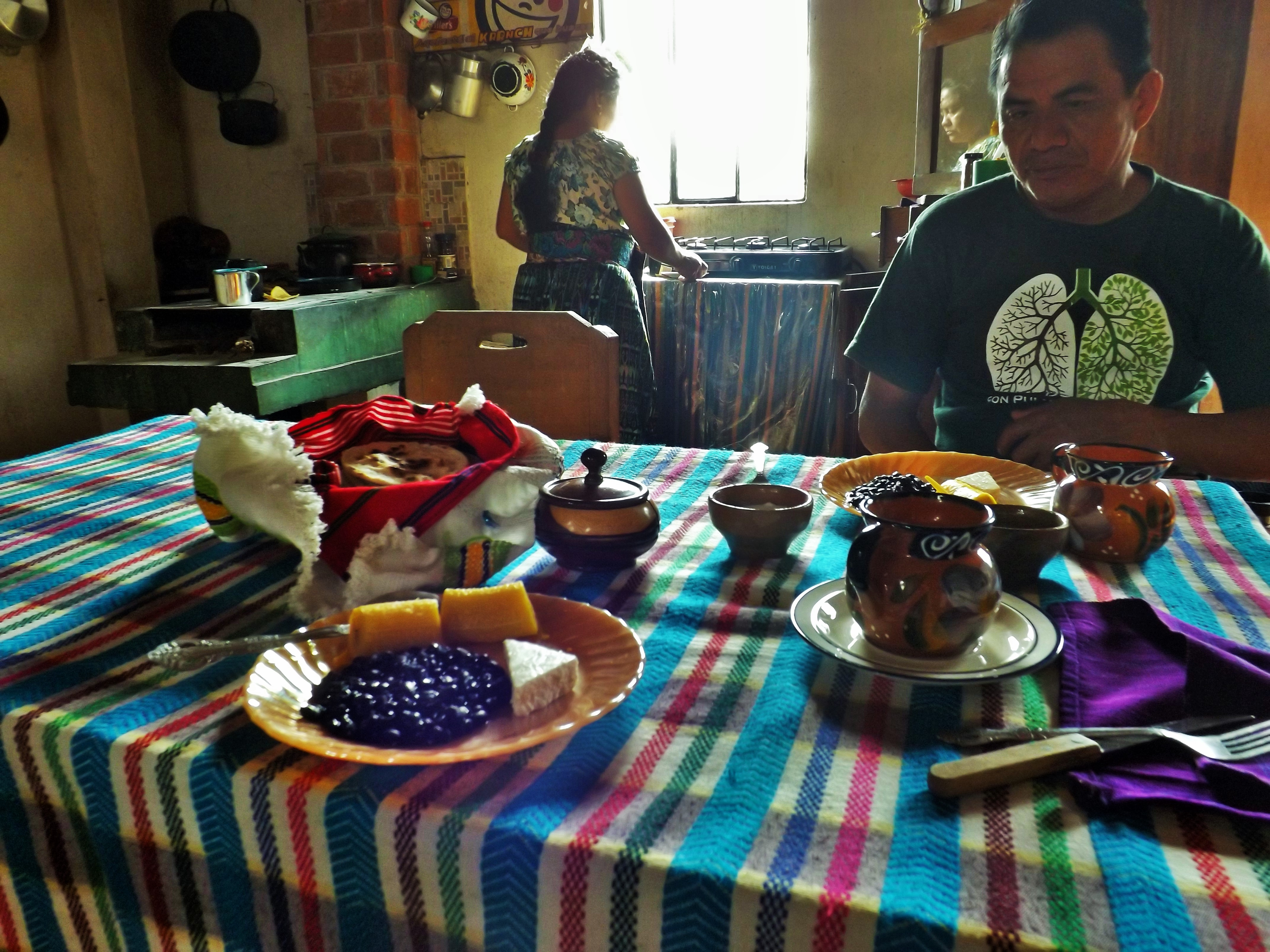
Husband and wife having a traditional Guatemalan breakfast.

Gender relations in Guatemala examine how traditional norms influence the daily interactions and relationships between Guatemalan men and women. In Guatemala's societal structure, men and women are encouraged to participate in activities corresponding to their gender. Due to this, Guatemalan men and women are segregated by their gender roles and responsibilities. Likewise, research shows that individuals experience gender relations differently depending on whether they are from a Latino or Maya ethnic group, i.e., non-indigenous or indigenous.

In Guatemala, machismo culture is a social construct that shapes the attitudes and values of many Latino and Maya peoples. This mentality affects partner relationships and sibling relationships as Guatemalan men and women are expected to carry out gender-specific responsibilities. Moreover, machista attitudes have been instrumental in fostering men’s abuse of women. Gender relations are also prevalent in employment, as Guatemalan men and women oftentimes do not receive equal opportunities, benefits, and earnings. Another social sector where machismo beliefs affect gender relations is in non-indigenous and indigenous peoples’ education.

== Overview ==
Historically, Guatemala is a country well-known for its compliance with machismo and marianismo culture. Machismo also referred to as hyper-masculinity, emphasizes men's right to overpower women both physically and mentally in all areas of life. An example of this is how men who adhere to the principles of machismo feel entitled to treat women as their subordinates. In Guatemalan society, machismo affects gender roles, particularly those assigned to women. From an early age, Guatemalan women are told to embody marianismo–a role requiring them to be faithful, family-oriented, and submissive. For instance, women's roles consist of performing household duties and caring for the children, whereas men are the patriarchs and breadwinners of their households. Stereotypical gender roles also discourage women from working, which causes them to depend on men financially. Additionally, Guatemalan men attempt to prevent women from leaving dysfunctional relationships by claiming they are being consistent with machismo values. As a result, men’s actions, such as domestic violence, are justified. Some women who endure toxic masculinity, specifically K'iche' Maya women, have reported developing mental health issues, including anxiety. In modern Guatemala, machismo takes several forms outside of family relationships and domestic abuse. For example, the machismo mentality creates barriers for women wanting to enter the workforce or pursue an education, as traditional gender roles designate them as belonging in the house. As machismo becomes apparent across institutions, such as in the family, economy, and educational system, the gender disparity between Guatemalan men and women continues to expand.

== Relationships ==
=== Familial relations ===
==== Partners ====
From 1998 to 1999, Guatemala’s state revised the Guatemalan Civil Code to forbid married men from controlling their wives and setting strict provisions. However, gender stereotypes persist in Guatemala, including in the Chocolá community, as families incorporate traditional machismo into their daily lifestyles. In Chocolá, Guatemala, husbands direct their Maya wives to fulfill the household duties of looking after them, their children, house, and food. On the other hand, men usually get involved in penny capitalism and find work in coffee fields. In some cases, men let women work in their household stores, selling homemade food and snacks, such as tamales.

In partner relationships, machismo tends to create a power imbalance between Guatemalan men and women. For instance, the head of the family, the man, typically chooses whether his wife can work or if she can leave the house without his authority being questioned. Some K'iche' Maya women also found problems arose in their marital relationships when they lacked control over household decisions. However, studies show that some Guatemalan husbands make the household decisions, while others do not. For example, husbands who emigrate to America have limited control over decisions as women left behind in Guatemala assume their conventional duties. Additionally, Guatemalan women with some education tend to make the household decisions without consulting their husbands first.

==== Siblings ====
Most Guatemalan families believe that boys and girls must be taught the same cultural beliefs, such as acting with manners and treating others equally. Research has also found that parents unconsciously impose machismo and marianismo-based attitudes and expectations onto their sons and daughters.

During their teenage years, parents advise their sons to act "macho" as a rite of passage toward becoming men. As a result, they have more space to build agency and become independent, while girls are not offered such opportunities. This is because parents, specifically indigenous parents, fear their daughters being sexually abused or becoming pregnant.

In Guatemalan society, boys are encouraged to pursue and receive a formal education, whereas girls' education is not prioritized because they must help their mothers with domestic duties. Since the girls adapt to restricted lifestyles, their educational opportunities grow limited, and they conform to their gender roles. In some cases, young girls are married off and become dependent on their husbands.

=== Domestic violence ===
In 1966, the "Law to Prevent, Sanction, and Eradicate Intra-Family Violence" was established to end men's violent conduct toward women. However, it was ineffective as offenders went unpunished, and law enforcement did not act in favor of the victims. Since the men perpetuating these actions saw no consequences, domestic abuse continues to be acceptable and tolerated in Guatemalan society. Generally, as men escape blame for maltreatment, women suffer both physically and emotionally because of men's choices.

In 2018, the Public Ministry recorded 51,906 complaints regarding Guatemala's gender-based violence against women. In a study, the participants revealed that men from the Chocolá community who drank alcohol tended to abuse their partners. Also, if women performed their household tasks poorly, men who maintained a machismo complex felt they could hurt women. In many cases, women experiencing this harmful behavior struggle to abandon toxic relationships because they cannot support their children and themselves financially.

== Gender inequality ==
=== Employment ===
In August 2023, the Statista Research Department reported that women and men had unequal job opportunities in Guatemala. Research revealed that the gender wage gap between them was 46 percent. Guatemala currently has less than 40 percent of women in the workforce.

In Chocolá, Guatemala, many K'iche' Maya people find economic opportunities inaccessible because the majority of them live in poverty. Additionally, many women struggle to acquire similar jobs to men because they are responsible for attending household duties and children. Compared to men, women struggle not only to find jobs but also to start their own businesses.

=== Education ===
In Guatemalan society, the gender relations among Ladino and indigenous students differ.

In 2000, roughly 2.4 percent more Guatemalan boys attended school than Guatemalan girls. In 2005, about 87 percent of Ladino men and 68 percent of indigenous men were literate. On the other hand, approximately 77 percent of Ladino women, and only about 33 percent of indigenous women were literate. The statistics revealed that indigenous men and women have less accessibility to receiving a formal education due to their financial circumstances. However, Ladino individuals have more educational opportunities because of their economic status.
