= Alcatraz Proclamation =

Speech delivered by Richard Oakes

The Alcatraz Proclamation (Proclamation: To The Great White Father and All His People) was a page-long statement delivered by Richard Oakes on November 10, 1969. The Proclamation was delivered to San Francisco news reporters on the Alcatraz Island and was also shown in the January 1970 issue of the Movement Newspaper published by SNCC. The Proclamation was followed by one of the major protests of the Red Power Movement, the Occupation of Alcatraz (November 20, 1969 – June 11, 1971) initially by 89 Native Americans on November 20, 1969.

== The Proclamation ==
The Proclamation's draft was a result of the co-work of Richard Oakes and Adam Fortunate Eagle and was inspired by the declaration made by the Sioux occupiers in 1964. The Indians of All Tribes finalized the format of the statement which was distributed in brochures.

Reasoning of the Occupation The language of the Alcatraz Proclamation has satiric and serious features as it blends historic facts and anecdotes about the treaties the American Government made with Native Americans in the past. The Proclamation discusses the "white man's" past dealings with Native Americans as a basis to justify their "purchase" of Alcatraz Island, by citing the anecdote about how white people had purchased the Manhattan Island about 300 years before. The Proclamation also talks about that the Indians would give a relatively good price for the Island, highlighting that their "offer of $1.24 per acres is greater than the $0.47 per acre the white men are now paying the California Indians for their lands." It also points out the fact that the conditions on Alcatraz Island are no worse but might be even better than what Native Americans faced in the reservations. It lists the lack of "adequate means of transport", running water, oil and mineral rights, industry, healthcare and educational facilities. The statement also highlights that Alcatraz Island is isolated from modern facilities, has great unemployment and that its population always exceeded its land base and been held as prisoners.

Purposes of the Occupation

The proclamation also enlisted the purposes the occupiers aimed to used the island for. These included the establishment of

- a "Center for Native American Studies",
- an "American Indian Spiritual Center",
- an "Indian Center of Ecology" and
- a "Great Indian Training School".

The purpose of the Center for Native American Studies, according to the proclamation was to "educate them to the skills and knowledge relevant to improve the lives and spirits of all Indian peoples. " The occupiers also mentioned that this program would include providing education to the dwellers of several reservations. The occupiers aimed to use the American Indian Spiritual Center as a place where ancient they can practice their ancient tribal religions. According to the document, the Indian Center of Ecology's purpose was to "train and support our young people in scientific research and practice to restore our lands and waters to their pure and natural state". The Proclamation stated that the Great Indian Training School would be a multifunctional center that includes display of Indian arts and crafts a restaurant serving traditional food and an education program in order to beat unemployment. The occupiers also planned to establish a museum to display the Native American cultural contributions to the world, parts of Indian history and the mistreatment Native Americans suffered from white people.

Justification of the Occupation

The document concludes by stating that the occupiers believe that their claim for Alcatraz Island is "just and proper" and it should be granted to them "as long as the rivers run and the sun shall shine". The occupiers based this concluding statement on the Fort Laramie Treaty of 1868 which provided that Sioux people can claim any facility abandoned by the United States within their territory, despite not all occupiers were Sioux nor Alcatraz Island was Sioux territory.

The statement was signed by "Indians of All Tribes".

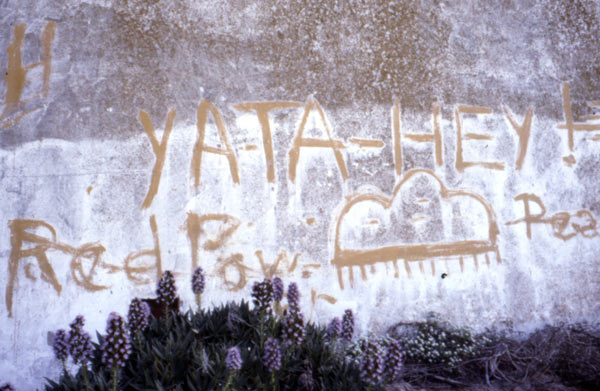
A graffiti of a Navajo greeting, "Yata-Hey" on Alcatraz Island. The occupiers left their mark on the buildings.

== Implications ==
The proclamation was followed by one of the most influential demonstration of the Red Power Movement, the Occupation of Alcatraz. The Native Americans "Held the Rock" from November, 1969, to June, 1971. The group of Indians which was initially made up of mainly California college students, lived on the island together for 19 months until the protest was forcibly ended by the United States Government According to researchers the Proclamation played a major role in influencing more and more Native Americans to join the protest.

== Related pages ==
- Occupation of Alcatraz
- Richard Oakes
- Red Power Movement
- Alcatraz Island
- Bay Area
- Civil Rights
- Native American Civil Rights
