= Mel Thom =

Native American activist (born 1938)

- Born: Melvin Thom; July 28, 1938 (age 88); Walker River Indian Reservation, Schurz, Nevada, U.S.
- Education: Brigham Young University
- Occupation: Native American civil rights activist

Melvin Thom (born July 28, 1938) was born on the Walker River Indian Reservation in Schurz, Nevada. A leader in the movement for Native American civil rights, Thom was one of the founders of the National Indian Youth Council in the 1960s.

== Background ==
Thom graduated from Lyon County High School in Yerington, Nevada and then studied civil engineering at Brigham Young University. At BYU, he was President of the Tribe of Many Feathers Club for three years and also President of the Southwest Regional Indian Youth Council.
