= Faith Smith =

Native American organizer and educational leader

- Citizenship: Lac Courtes Oreilles Ojibwe
- Education: Purdue University
- Organization: NAES College
- Title: President

Faith Smith is a Native American activist and educator. Her career included work at Chicago's American Indian Center, with the Native American Committee, and most notably as the president of the Native American Educational Services College from 1974 to 2004.

== Early life ==
Smith spent her early childhood on the Lac Courte Oreilles Ojibwe reservation in Wisconsin. She attended the Kinnamon School there. Her family relocated to Chicago, and she later attended and graduated from Purdue University in 1966. She commented that "because of affirmative action, colleges were vacuuming Indian communities across the country, finding the brightest Indians, but after college, a lot of them couldn't make the transition back home. They had changed. Their communities had changed."

== Career ==
In the mid-1960s, Smith became involved with the National Indian Youth Council, the first independent Native American student organization. After graduating from Purdue University, she began working at the Chicago American Indian Center (AIC) as a caseworker. In a 1991 interview, Smith said that she and others at the AIC felt the organization should focus on the alleviation of "poverty and the problems of Indians on the streets," but that there was also "a strong contingent of people who felt that the center ought to be more of a middle-classy sort of thing, a social center or that sort of stuff." In the late 1960s, Smith and others formed the Native American Committee (NAC) within the AIC to pursue more activist goals and a more comprehensive educational vision, the NAC incorporating as an independent body in 1970. Member Helen Whitehead (Ho-Chunk-Ojibwe) described NAC: "Our main thrust is to start at the time they're very young and to build a positive self-image."

Smith was an assistant to Robert Reitz, an anthropologist and long-time director of AIC, when Reitz died unexpectedly in 1971. Smith was appointed interim director. In August of that year, the AIC board of directors voted to dismiss Smith for "insubordination and questionable banking practices." Smith's supporters responded by convening a meeting of the full AIC membership, which both reinstated Smith and replaced numerous members of the board of the directors.

That same year, NAC founded in collaboration with Chicago Public Schools the Little Big Horn School to address the needs of Native American high school students, and then in 1973 the O-Wai-Ya-Wa Elementary School program. In 1974, Smith and NAC founded and Smith became the president of the Native American Educational Services College (NAES College), the first urban institution of higher learning managed by and serving Native Americans. Smith served as president of the college until 2004, when she resigned and was replaced by Dorene Wiese.

== See also ==
- Urban Indian
- Native American civil rights
- Red Power movement
