= Nancy Dumont =

Native American organizer and education leader

- Born: January 7, 1936; Poplar, Montana
- Died: October 2002 (aged 65–66); Wolf Point, Montana, U.S.
- Citizenship: Assiniboine and Sioux Tribes of the Fort Peck Indian Reservation, United States
- Relatives: Robert V. Dumont, Jr. (brother)

Nancy Dumont (1936–2002) was a Native American educational leader who lived in and worked in Chicago, Illinois and Montana.

== Life and education ==
An Assiniboine citizen of the Assiniboine and Sioux Tribes of the Fort Peck Indian Reservation, Dumont grew up in the area of Wolf Point, Montana. After high school, she attended Haskell Institute where she graduated with a degree in business. In 1966, she moved to Chicago to attend Northeastern Illinois University where she earned a BA. She returned to Montana briefly in the mid-1970s, relocated to the Midwest a second time to do a master's degree at the University of Chicago in 1983, and then returned to Montana.

== Career ==
Dumont become an active leader in the Chicago Native American community and was part of the second generation of Native American leaders of the city's American Indian Center, which had been established by Willard LaMere and others in 1953. She served on the founding board of directors of the Native American Educational Services College, the first urban institution of higher learning designed, managed, and serving Native Americans. The college was based on an initial set of proposals for a degree-granting institution combining academic and tribal knowledges that was drafted by a committee including her brother, Robert V. Dumont.

After returning to Montana in the 1980s, she worked at the Fort Peck Indian Reservation's Education Department, in Indian Child Welfare Programs, and in alcohol programs. She also served as the Federal Projects Coordinator at Wolf Point Public Schools.
