= Millie Ketcheschawno =

Native American activist

Mildred "Millie" Ketcheschawno
- Born: February 9, 1937; Oklahoma, United States of America
- Died: December 11, 2000 (aged 63); Oklahoma, United States of America
- Education: Bachelor of Arts (honors) from the University of California at Berkeley in American Indian studies and film
- Occupation: Activist for native american rights. film writer. producer
- Known for: Native American Activism, leading with her influence for the creation of Indigenous Peoples' Day.
- Awards: 1993: National Indian Education Association "Student of the Year’’
- Honours: 1994: City of Berkeley "Outstanding Woman of the Year"

Mildred E. "Millie" Ketcheschawno (February 9, 1937 – December 11, 2000) was an activist for Native American rights and a filmmaker who was one of the founders of Indigenous Peoples' Day. In the 1970s she became the first woman president of the Intertribal Friendship House. She received her Bachelor of Arts (Honors) from the University of California at Berkeley in American Indian studies and film in the late 1990s. Her activism began when she provided leadership to an important pan-ethnic movement known as the Indians of All Tribes movement (IOAT). Her advocacy was extended to the film industry when she became one of the writers for the documentary "Alcatraz is Not an Island," which was directed by James M. Fortier and released in 2001. Through her activism, she facilitated the counteraction of Columbus Day with the creation of Indigenous Peoples' Day, that is celebrated across the United States till present.

== Life and family ==
=== Early life and education ===
Born in 1937, Ketcheschawno was from Oklahoma and left her hometown community at Shell Creek to attend an American Indian boarding school in Haskell, Kansas. Later she moved to Oakland, California, and in San Francisco, Ketcheschawno created ties with other Native Americans who advocated for the preservation of Indigenous traditions and provided support to those affected by stereotypes and discrimination. She was a leader in the Indians of All Tribes pan-ethnic movement based in San Francisco. In 1969 the movement sponsored the Alcatraz Island occupations.

In 1990 Ketcheschawno enrolled for a Bachelor of Arts degree in American Indian studies and film at the University of California at Berkeley, where she graduated with honors in 1995.

=== Family ===
Ketcheschawno married Angelo Barichello sometime in the late 1950s, and they later divorced in the early 1970s. Together they had two children named Leslie and Gino. She later married her second husband, Vernon Ketcheshawno of the Kickapoo Nation. After their marriage, she and her family settled in Oklahoma. Vernon Ketcheshawno died in 1986.

== Career and activism ==
=== Alcatraz Island occupation: activism and documentary ===
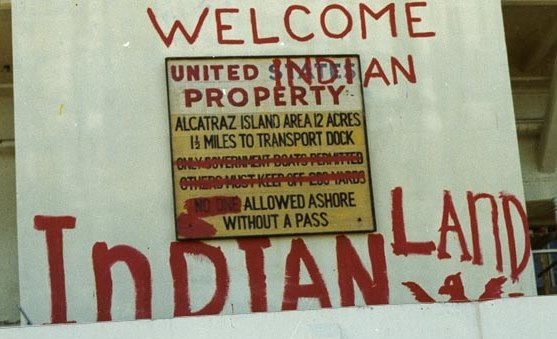
Graffiti during the occupation of Alcatraz by activists.

In 1963, the U.S. government closed a federal prison on Alcatraz Island in San Francisco Bay. The San Francisco United Council of Native Americans then proposed that the island become an ecology center for Native Americans. This was, however, objected to by the U.S. government which sparked an Indian-nationalist movement. This movement culminated with the occupation of Alcatraz Island by Native American activists, among them was Ketcheschawno. The idea behind the Occupation of Alcatraz was to lay claim to Indigenous land rights and rebuild Indian America. According to Ketcheschawno's son, Gino Barichello, his late mother was among those in the community to visit the occupation whenever she could.

This island would become a symbol of Native American activism. The slogan of this movement was the following: “Alcatraz is Not an Island”. It aimed to highlight how the movement’s aims went beyond the simple occupation of Alcatraz. In 2001, the documentary Alcatraz is Not an Island which was directed by James M. Fortier, and written by Troy Johnson, Jon Plutte, Mike Yearling and Ketcheshawno, was released. The film won Best Documentary Feature at the American Indian Film Festival in San Francisco in 1999. This documentary chronicles the long struggle undertaken by Native Americans, and which altered U.S. government policies towards Indigenous communities. It further provides a perspective as to how this event transformed the way Native Americans perceive themselves and their heritage.

=== Leadership involvement in pan-ethnic indigenous activism ===
Ketcheschawno was a central figure in the organization of pan-Indian activism in the next decades. She held a leadership position in the Bay Area Native American Council and was the first woman president of the Intertribal Friendship House, a space for socialization and networking for Indian activists. Late in her life she sponsored the Indigenous Peoples' Day at Berkeley.

== Founding of Indigenous Peoples Day (United States) ==
Ketcheschawno was one of the coordinators and founders of Indigenous Peoples' Day in Berkeley, California, along with other important committee members such as Don Littlecloud Davenport and Mark Gorrell. The roots of Indigenous Peoples' Day come from three important conferences: Geneva in 1977, Ecuador in 1990, and D-Q University in 1991. Indigenous Peoples' Day was created to criticize and question the myths about Christopher Columbus, as well as bring to light atrocities Indigenous peoples faced. The holiday is also about celebrating Native American culture. Other cities in the US also begun celebrating Indigenous Peoples' Day, inspired by the movement in Berkeley in which Ketcheschawno played a key role.

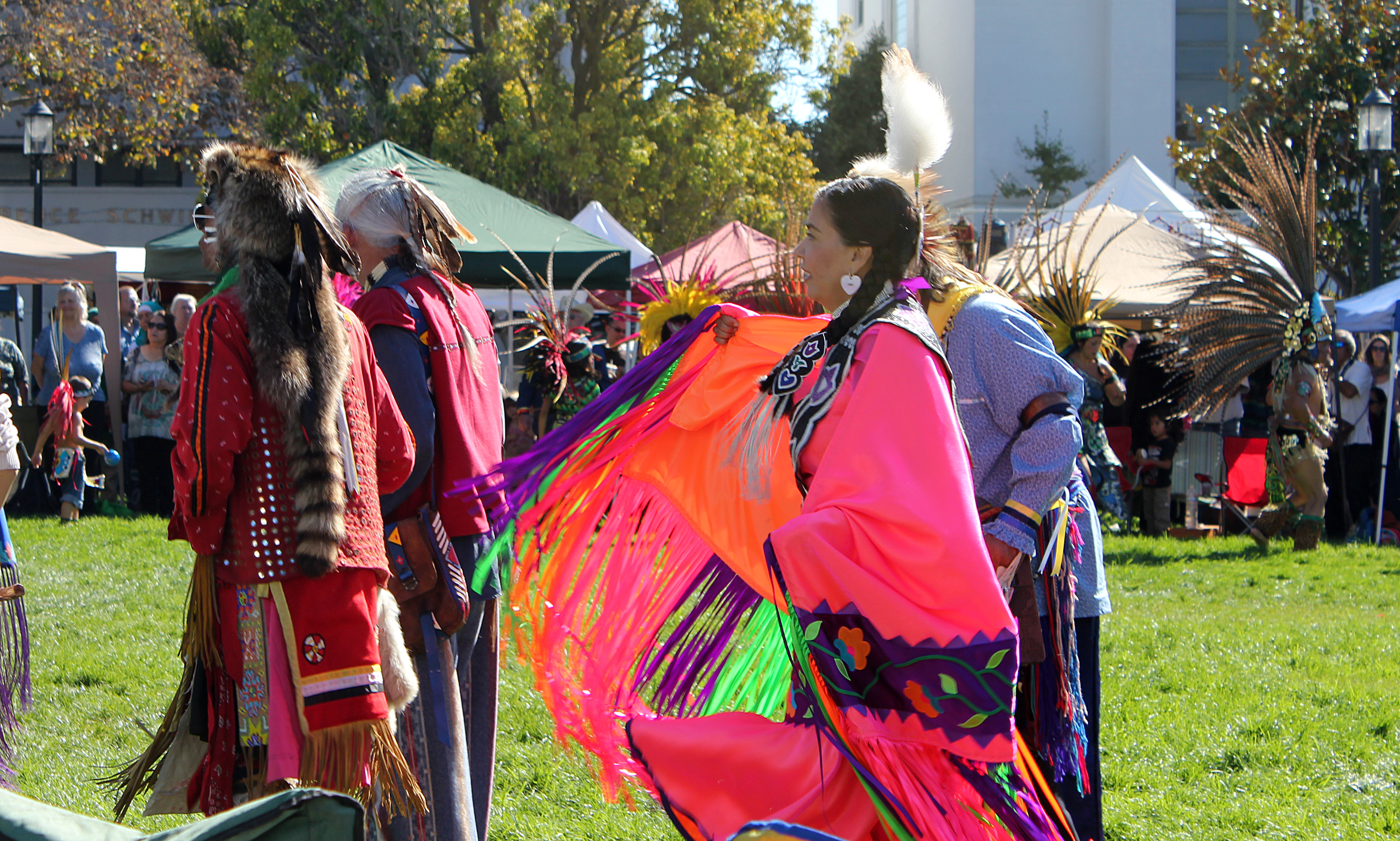
Indigenous Peoples Day in Berkeley.

When the US Congress used the Bay Area for a commemoration of Columbus, there was a push to include Indigenous Peoples' Day in Berkeley. In 1991, the actions of the US Congress caused Ketcheschawno, who was a part of the Indigenous rights coalition called the Resistance 500, to advocate for Indigenous Peoples' Day. Ketcheschawno and other activists convinced the Berkeley City Council to vote in favor of making it an official holiday. Ketcheschawno also contributed to Indigenous Peoples' Day by being the director of the Inter-Tribal Friendship House in Oakland. This is where she helped spread information about the roots of the holiday, such as the 1977 Geneva Conference, which helped the group understand more about the complexities of Indigenous issues. Ketcheschawno was also the one who proposed to have their first pow-wow in Civic Center Park in Berkeley.

== Death ==
She died on December 11, 2000, at the age of 63, due to an accident in her home, and was buried at Greenwood Cemetery in Eufaula, Oklahoma.
