= Generation YES =

U.S. based non-profit organization

Youth and Educators Succeeding
- Formation: Olympia, Washington (1995)
- Type: Non-profit
- Tax ID no.: 31–1808170
- Location: Tumwater, Washington
- Products: See program listing.
- Key people: Dr. Dennis Harper, Founder, Adam Fletcher (speaker), Executive Director. Victoria McKinnon, Operations Director

Youth and Educators Succeeding, formerly known as Generation YES, was a U.S. based non-profit organization that works with schools around the world to empower underserved students and ensure that technology investments in education are both cost effective and meaningful. Dr. Dennis Harper was the founder and CEO from 1996 to 2020; upon his retirement, Adam F.C. Fletcher succeeded him. YES programs focused on student centered, project-based learning "experiences that impact student's lives and increase student involvement in school and community through the use of technology." In addition, research showed "all YES programs improved the use of technology in the school as a whole."

== History ==
Youth and Educators Succeeding was founded by Dr. Dennis Harper in 1995 when he was a technology director for the Olympia, Washington school district. He wrote a United States Department of Education Technology Innovation Challenge Grant proposal to develop an initiative to involve children in the acceptance of technology in curriculum. The grant was approved in 1996 for five years, concluding in 2001. In 2020, Adam Fletcher became the executive director of Youth and Educators Succeeding.

The organization was a 501(c)(3) supported by schools and partnerships with other organizations to develop customized student technology programs.

The organization closed permanently in 2022.

Generation YES continues under the auspices of the Ohio Management Council where their curriculum, 20 years of research, and numerous videos are available to K-12 schools.

== Programs ==
Youth and Educators Succeeding provides K-12 schools across the U.S. with the GenYES program. GenYES (originally known as Generation www.Y and Generation WHY) has students assist teachers as they integrate technology in classrooms. These students are denoted as Student Technology Leaders. Student Technology Leaders are then partnered with teachers to support efforts to integrate technology in classrooms by doing hardware and software support and even designing professional development.

According to Youth and Educators Succeeding, more than 2,500 schools used their programs.

== Awards and recognition ==
In 2000, GenYES was awarded one of two "Exemplary" designations by the U.S. Department of Education (ED) Educational Technology Expert Panel. The ED then wrote a publication about Generation YES and its status, reporting that,

Reviewers were impressed by the creativity of [GenYES in] creating a role reversal in which students help support the school's technology infrastructure and partner with teachers in curriculum development.

In 2003 Youth and Educators Succeeding was named "Rookie of the Year" at the EdNET Industry Awards. Founder Dennis Harper has also received numerous accolades due to his work related to Youth and Educators Succeeding.

The company and its programs have been featured in numerous important education publications, technology industry magazines, and academic journals. Edutopia, a respected progressive education magazine published by the George Lucas Educational Foundation, has interviewed a Youth and Educators Succeeding (then known as www.Y) program support specialist in 2001, and subsequently featured Youth and Educators Succeeding (then known as Generation YES) twice. Other publications, including Educational Leadership and THE Journal, Curriculum Review have highlighted GenYES as well.

In 2005 the Encyclopedia of Distance Learning wrote that,

Generation YES... prove[s] that the nearly 50 million students in our schools are ready to become our nation's most plentiful and critical resources for educational reform and improvement... Students in GenYES have worked magic... they have made schools places that students want [original emphasis] to be...

== Related links ==
- Official website
