= Penny capitalism =

The term penny capitalism was first used in 1953 to describe indigenous economies in which there is land tenure over tiny plots of land, where farmers produce crop surplus and engage in small-scale trading. Microfinance evolved in penny capitalist economies.

Sol Tax published a book entitled Penny Capitalism ISBN 0-374-97785-2. He is said to have coined this term.
