= American Indian Chicago Conference =

Conference held June 13–20, 1961

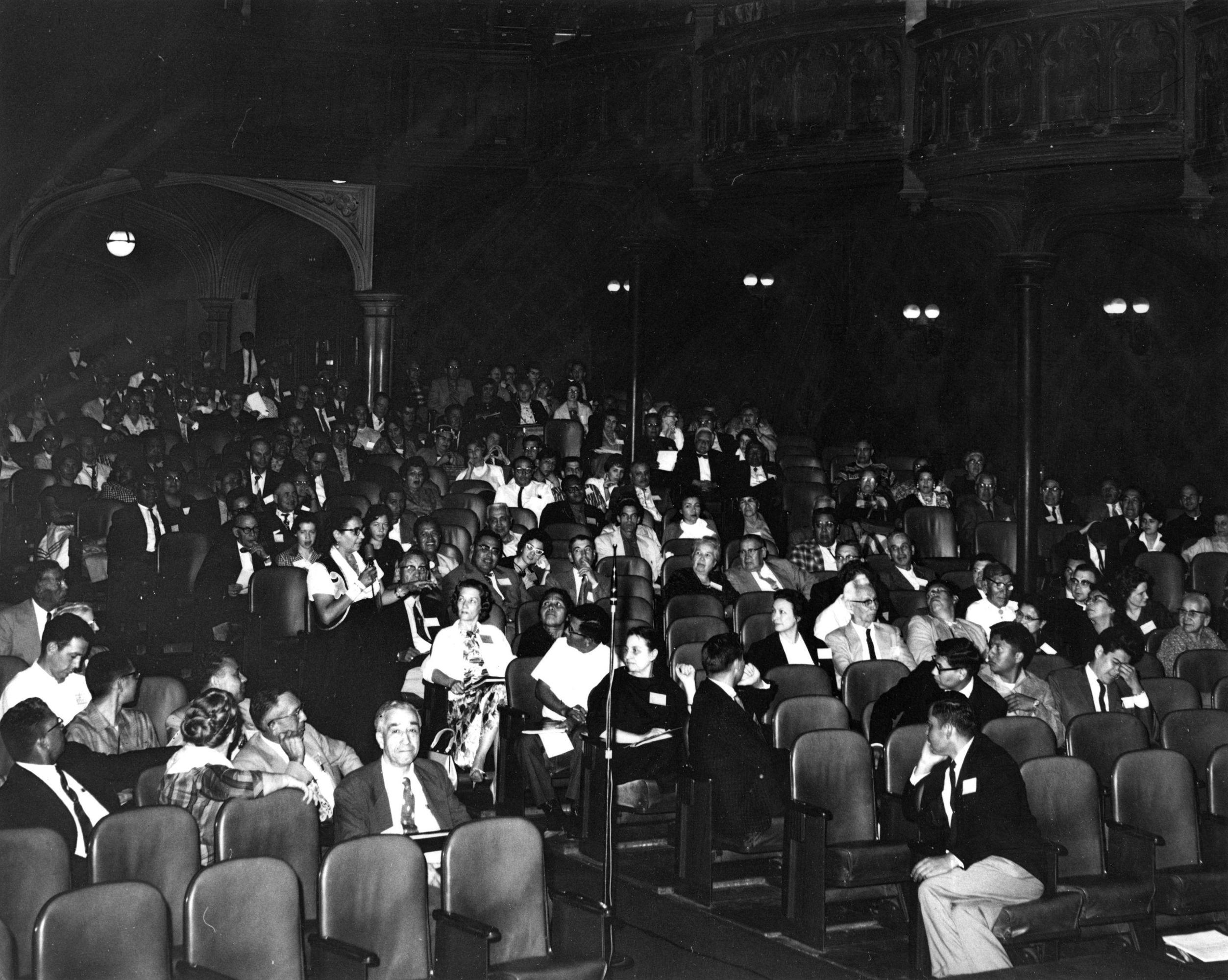
The 1961 American Indian Chicago Conference

American Indian Chicago Conference (AICC) was an influential week-long conclave of 460 American Indians from 90 tribes, held from June 13 to June 20, 1961. One convener of the event, University of Chicago anthropologist Sol Tax, the founder of "action anthropology," described the purpose of the event as helping "all Indians of the whole nation to express their own views" and to create if possible a shared declaration. Among the key organizers were Lacy W. Maynor (Lumbee) and William C. Rickard (Tuscarora), the son of Clinton Rickard, founder of the Indian Defense League.

The Emil Schwarzhaupt Foundation, Wenner-Gren Foundation, and the University of Chicago provided some financial support for the meeting.

After exchanging opinions that ranged over many aspects of Indian affairs, the conference created a "Declaration of Indian Purpose", the first major collective statement on tribal self-determination.

Representatives from the conference formally presented the declaration to President John F. Kennedy in a ceremony at the White House on August 5, 1962. The spirit of self-determination expressed in the document was a cornerstone of Native activism in the years that followed, including the Red Power movement and the expansion of Native American gaming.

After the White House gathering, the Indians met with Vice President Lyndon Johnson, Senator Sam J. Ervin, Jr., and Congressman Ben Reifel, himself of Lakota Indian ancestry and a founder of NCAI, in order to discuss a legislative program suggested by the Declaration of Indian Purpose.
