= Dennis Harper =

American educator

- Occupation: Educator
- Known for: Student-driven technology education

Dennis O. Harper is an American educator and the founder of Generation YES, a nonprofit technology education organization founded in 1999. He is an active advocate for the transformative power of technology in education and for student leadership as change agents in schools.

== Career ==
=== Education and Early Teaching Career ===
Harper began his career teaching secondary school mathematics, science, and computer science from 1968 to 1979, at schools in the United States, Australia, West Germany, Liberia, and Spain. He received a master’s degree in education from the University of California, and a Ph.D. in international education in 1984. Harper was also a lecturer at Universiti Kebangsaan Malaysia in 1983. He served as a supervisor of Teacher Education and director of the Special Education Computer Center and taught education and sociology courses at the University of California, Santa Barbara until 1986. In 1986 and 1987 he was the Educational Computing Coordinator at the National Institute of Education in Singapore. He was a Visiting Professor of Educational Technology at the University of Helsinki in Helsinki, Finland in 1987. From January 1988 to June 1992 Harper was an associate professor of Education and Academic Computing at the University of the Virgin Islands in St. Thomas. While in the Virgin Islands, he worked with a team to create distance learning in Caribbean countries and founded Caribbean Computer Users in Education, serving as its president until 1991.

=== Founder of Generation YES ===
In 1992, Harper was hired as the technology coordinator for the Olympia School District in Olympia, Washington. In 1996, Harper secured a Technology Innovation Challenge Grant from the U.S. Department of Education to launch Generation Y, a program which trained elementary, middle, and high school students to work with classroom teachers to incorporate technology into their teaching. In the program, based on the theory of constructionism, students and teachers worked together to develop lesson plans using school computer resources.

In 1999, Harper founded Generation YES, to expand the Gen Y model and student technology leadership programs to schools around the United States and other countries. During his tenure, Generation YES programs were implemented in hundreds of schools worldwide supporting project-based learning, student leadership, teacher professional development, and technology initiatives including One Laptop Per Child, virtual learning, and technology literacy certification. Harper headed Generation YES until his retirement in 2021. Generation YES continues under the auspices of the Ohio Management Council where their curriculum, 20 years of research, and numerous videos are available to K-12 schools.

=== Other Work ===
Harper was on the board of directors for the International Society for Technology in Education from June 1997 to June 1999. He has served on advisory boards with a variety of organizations and journals, including Technology and Learning Journal and Computers in the Schools Journal. He was also the International Editor of the Logo Exchange. Harper was instrumental in the development of the Liberian Renaissance Education Complex, which opened in 2007, and currently serves on the founding advisory board for Harvest Intercontinental American University in Monrovia, Liberia. He has been a keynote speaker and presenter at numerous education and technology conferences throughout the world.

== Publications ==
Harper wrote RUN: Computer Education while a faculty member at the University of California, which was published in two distinct editions. He authored the Principal’s Guide to Student Technology Leadership in 2018. He is also the author of numerous journal articles and textbooks, including Logo: Theory & Practice.

== Awards and accolades ==
Harper has received the Golden Apple Award from the Corporation for Public Broadcasting (1997). He has been named "Shaper of Our Future" by Converge magazine (2000), "Technology Advocate for the United States" by District Administrator (2001), "Distinguished Educator of the Year" by Technology & Learning (1992), and one of the "Daring Dozen" by Edutopia magazine (2008).

His creation of GenYES has also led to wide acclaim throughout the education industry, as one recent journal exemplified by proclaiming, "Dennis Harper literally wrote the blueprint on how to work with students to create technology plans."
