= Indian Relocation Act of 1956 =

Law attempting to move Native Americans

- Long title: An Act relative to employment for certain adult Indians on or near Indian reservations.
- Enacted by: the 84th United States Congress
- Effective: August 3, 1956

Citations
- Public law: 84-959
- Statutes at Large: 70 Stat. 986

Legislative history
- Introduced in the Senate as S. 3416 on July 19, 1956; Committee consideration by U.S. Senate Committee on Interior and Insulars Affair, U.S. House Committee on Interior and Insular Affairs; Passed the Senate on July 23, 1956 (Passed); Passed the House on July 27, 1956 (Passed); Signed into law by President Dwight D. Eisenhower on August 3, 1956

The Indian Relocation Act of 1956 (also known as Public Law 959 or the Adult Vocational Training Program) was a United States law intended to create a "a program of vocational training" for American Indians in the United States. The act has been characterized as an attempt to encourage American Indians to leave Indian reservations and their traditional ancestral lands and to assimilate them into the general population in urban areas, thus weakening community and tribal ties. As such, it has been characterized as a component of the assimilatory Indian termination policies passed between 1940 and 1960, which terminated the tribal status of numerous groups and cut off previous assistance to tribal citizens. The Indian Relocation Act encouraged and forced American Indians to move to cities for job opportunities. It also played a significant role in increasing the population of urban Indians in succeeding decades.

At a time when the U.S. government was decreasing subsidies to American Indians living on reservations, the Relocation Act offered to pay moving expenses and provide some vocational training for those who were willing to move from the reservations to certain government-designated cities, where employment opportunities were said by the legislators to be favorable. Types of assistance offered included relocation transportation, transportation of household goods, subsistence per diem for both the time of relocation and up to four weeks after arrival, and funds to purchase tools or equipment for apprentice workers. Vocational training was oriented towards jobs in industry and other professions that hadn't existed in rural communities. Additional benefits offered included: medical insurance for workers and their dependents, grants to purchase work clothing, grants to purchase household goods and furniture, tuition costs for vocational night school training, and in some cases funds to help purchase a home. However, not all who accepted these offers actually received these benefits once they arrived in the cities, leading to some cases of poverty, culture shock, joblessness and homelessness among this population in the new, urban environment. A major issue for the American Indians that came with this was the then inability for them to return to their reservations. If relocation had been completed, the reservation the American Indians had previously lived on was dissolved. From 1950 to 1968 almost 200,000 American Indians migrated to cities, leaving reservations almost completely a thing of the past.

== Background ==
In 1947, Secretary of the Interior Julius Krug, at the request of President Truman, proposed a ten-year program to provide the Hopi and Navajo tribes with vocational training. In 1950, the Navajo-Hopi Law was passed which funded a program to help relocate tribe members to Los Angeles, Salt Lake City, and Denver and help them find jobs. In 1951 the Bureau of Indian Affairs began expanding the program and assigned relocation workers to Oklahoma, New Mexico, California, Arizona, Utah and Colorado, officially extending the program to all American Indians the following year. In 1955, additional BIA relocation offices in Cleveland, Dallas, Minneapolis, Oklahoma City, St. Louis, the San Francisco Bay area, San Jose, Seattle, and Tulsa were added. Relocation to cities, where more jobs were available, was expected to reduce poverty among Native Americans, who tended to live on isolated, rural reservations.

Through the first half of the 20th century, the majority of the American population had become increasingly urbanized, as cities were the places with jobs and related amenities. But in 1950, only 6% of American Indians lived in urban areas.

The plan of cultural assimilation that was followed assumed that mainstreaming of American Indians would be easier in metropolitan areas and there would be more work opportunities for them there. Quotas were implemented for processing relocatees. By 1954 approximately 6200 American Indians had been relocated to major U.S. cities.

== Text of the law ==
The main text of the act empowers the Secretary of the Interior to fund and administer a program for vocational training for eligible American Indians:

Be it enacted by the Senate and House of Representatives of the United States of America in Congress assembled, That in order to help adult Indians who reside on or near Indian reservations to obtain reasonable and satisfactory employment, the Secretary of the Interior is authorized to undertake a program of vocational training that provides for vocational counseling or guidance, institutional training in any recognized vocation or trade, apprenticeship, and on the job training, for periods that do not exceed twenty-four months, transportation to the place of training, and subsistence during the course of training. The program shall be available primarily to Indians who are not less than eighteen and not more than thirty-five years of age and who reside on or near an Indian reservation, and the program shall be conducted under such rules and regulations as the Secretary may prescribe. For the purposes of this program the Secretary is authorized to enter into contracts or agreements with any Federal, State, or local governmental agency, or with any private school which has a recognized reputation in the field of vocational education and has successfully found employment for its graduates in their respective fields of training, or with any corporation or association which has an existing apprenticeship or on-the-job training program which is recognized by industry and labor as leading to skilled employment.

Section 2 of the act sets an amount of funding for such programs:

There is authorized to be appropriated for the purposes of this Act the sum of $3,500,000 for each fiscal year, and not to exceed $500,000 of such sum shall be available for administrative purposes.

=== Consequences for American Indians ===
In 1960, it was reported that in excess of 31,000 people had moved off the reservation and to urban areas since 1952, with about 30% returning to their reservations. About 70% of them became self-sufficient in their new cities. It is estimated that between the 1950s and 1980s, as many as 750,000 Native Americans migrated to the cities, some as part of the relocation program, others on their own. By the 2000 census, the urban Indian population was 64% higher than it had been in the pre-termination era of the 1940s. The biggest concern for the federal government with the relocation of American Indians was that the large reservations could not hold them numbers wise. It was no longer that the land was too valuable for the Indians, but that the land was "too small" to hold them.

Schools offered vocational or on-the-job training to anyone age 18 to 35 who was at least one-fourth American Indian. More than 3500 persons enrolled in 322 institutions and job placement was reported at 70% by 1966. Oklahoma State University Institute of Technology reported that 91% of graduates were employed after the program. Students entered vocational programs, including study of more than 100 vocations including electronics, nursing, and X-ray technology, with assistance from the act. Students were provided two years of education, along with transportation, room, board, funds for books and tools, and a living allowance. Overall, the program had devastating long-term effects. Relocated tribe members became isolated from their communities and experienced homesickness. Many also faced racial discrimination and segregation. Many found only low-paying jobs with little advancement potential with the higher expenses typical for urban areas. Scholar Evelyn Nakano Glenn writes that "Native American men were often tracked into low-level, dead-end jobs, and women were directed to domestic service in white households". Many suffered from the lack of community support and lived in urban poverty, poor health, with substance abuse, emotional suffering, and a loss of tribal connection and cultural identity. Many could not return to dissolved reservations and those who could often found they did not "fit in" with those who stayed behind.

Given the rapid urban expansion of the period, Americans Indians often found that lower cost housing was often in areas most likely to be targeted for urban renewal and replaced with office buildings, freeways and commercial developments. This added to the instability of their lives. Redlining often made it impossible for people either to find homes near their employment or to be able to afford desirable housing. Children of relocated workers had difficulty enrolling in segregated public schools and faced the same social discrimination as their parents. These children of American Indians would in some scenarios be forced into boarding schools by the government. This was another layer of the plan to integrate Indians into urban life. It was at these boarding schools that the Native American children would have haircuts enforced and be essentially brainwashed against Native culture. The only positive was that at this point, very slowly, the boarding schools were beginning to be phased out.

Despite the overly positive declarations made by its supporters, in reality, termination and relocation policy wrought social havoc for Indians generally. Mothers would be terrified to let their children even so much as play in their neighborhood. The Native Americans felt lost in the city where they knew nothing. The groups would often end up living in hotels for long stretches of time upon moving to cities and having no money to afford much else than a room.

== American Indian resistance ==
While people who moved from reservations were initially isolated, American Indians began to form communities through intertribal communities. These community endeavors included cultural centers, pow wows, and general community support. In addition, more politically motivated cross cultural groups began to form with proximity in cities and a pan-Indian consciousness developed. This resulted in inter-tribal marriages and people holding claims to multiple Indian nations. Similarly, coalitions began to form among tribal communities which would not have existed had people stayed on reservations. Though this pan-Indian identity was important to bridge groups together, tribal differences were still important and did not lead to a "melting pot" of a single identity.

Pan-Indian political groups were unique to cities. First, these groups had proximity to black civil rights groups and provided support for political efforts, such as protests on Alcatraz. In addition, the American Indian Movement was founded in Minneapolis in 1968. This activism included legal challenges to the termination and relocation policy which eventually succeeded. Overall, American Indian activism had a large advantage in the cities over reservations, with large coalitions, proximity to other civil rights movements, and a distancing from the BIA.

== Academic analysis and criticism ==
Some scholars characterize the Indian Relocation Act as a settler-colonialist policy. According to this line of argument, the Indian Relocation Act, as part of Indian Termination policies, precipitated land grabs by settlers at the expense of American Indians. By the time that the Relocation Act was passed, Termination policies had already ended federal recognition, protections, and services, such as health care, given to tribes; the policies frequently drastically worsened living conditions on reservations and gave the impetus for a voluntary relocation program designed by the BIA.

The Indian Relocation Act can be seen as a successor of legal and institutionalized settler-colonialist policies beginning with the Dawes Severalty Act of 1887, which broke up communally owned reservation land into smaller, individually owned lots for each tribal member, many of which were in turn sold to settlers. Seen as a continuation of the Dawes Act, the Indian termination policy further emphasized individual ownership of land and sold more of reservation land to non-native buyers.

Over the next decade of the 1960s, the US federal government terminated 109 tribes and removed 2.5 million acres of trust land. Those who moved to cities through the Relocation Act forfeited their designated allotment, lessening the amount of land for reservations and making it more vulnerable to non-native encroachment. This seizure of land from the Dawes Act, the termination policy, and the subsequent relocation program opened Indian land to settlement by non-natives, development, and resource extraction. Critics of the Relocation Act describe the program as an effort at further assimilation and an opportunity for the federal government to "get out of the reservation business". The act was enticing for many American Indians precisely because of the negative consequences of termination policy. For those who did not leave voluntarily, BIA officials allegedly harassed reservation residents in an effort to force them off of their lands. For critics, the ultimate motivation behind the Relocation Act was to disconnect American Indians from their traditional homelands and communities.

Vine Deloria Jr. posited that the Relocation Act was an economic and cultural disaster for many American Indians, but a rationally-planned success for the federal government. Deloria characterized the act as the "most disastrous policy outside termination ... meant to get Indians off reservation and into the city slums where they could fade away".

== See also ==
- Native American civil rights
- Public Law 280, a 1953 law establishing "a method whereby States may assume jurisdiction over reservation Indians."
- American Indian Center
- Intertribal Friendship House
- Cultural assimilation of Native Americans
- Indian Placement Program
- American Indian outing programs
- Indian Removal Act of 1830
