= American Indian Center =

American non-profit cultural organization

- Founded: September 7, 1953
- Type: Non-profit cultural organization
- Purpose: To promote fellowship, understanding, and to perpetuate cultural values
- Location: Albany Park, Chicago
- Region served: Chicago metropolitan area
- Services: Archery, Social services, education, cultural programming
- Key people: AL Eastman, Archery Director
- Website: aicchicago.org

The American Indian Center (AIC) of Chicago is the oldest urban Native American center in the United States. It provides social services, youth and senior programs, cultural learning, and meeting opportunities for Native American peoples. For many years, it was located Uptown and is now in the Albany Park, Chicago community area.

== Background ==
The Native American population in the city of Chicago grew slowly in the late 19th century but began to accelerate in the 20th century as an outcome of the US government's Indian termination policy and Indian Relocation Act of 1956 as well as of the desire of Native Americans to avoid unemployment, overpopulation, and undernutrition on the reservations. Throughout the early twentieth century, women's philanthropic clubs had been the primary providers of social services for Native Americans arriving in Chicago. One of those clubs was the First Daughters of America, founded in 1930 by opera singer Tsianina Blackstone (Muscogee/Cherokee), Anna Fitzgerald (Chippewa), and other Chicago-area Native American women. Among the goals in the organization's charter were to discourage the unfair portrayal of the American Indian in popular culture, to eliminate race prejudice from textbooks, and to preserve the traditional arts, crafts, and music of the American Indian. It filled the need for social support and services until organizations like the American Indian Center were founded later.

== History ==
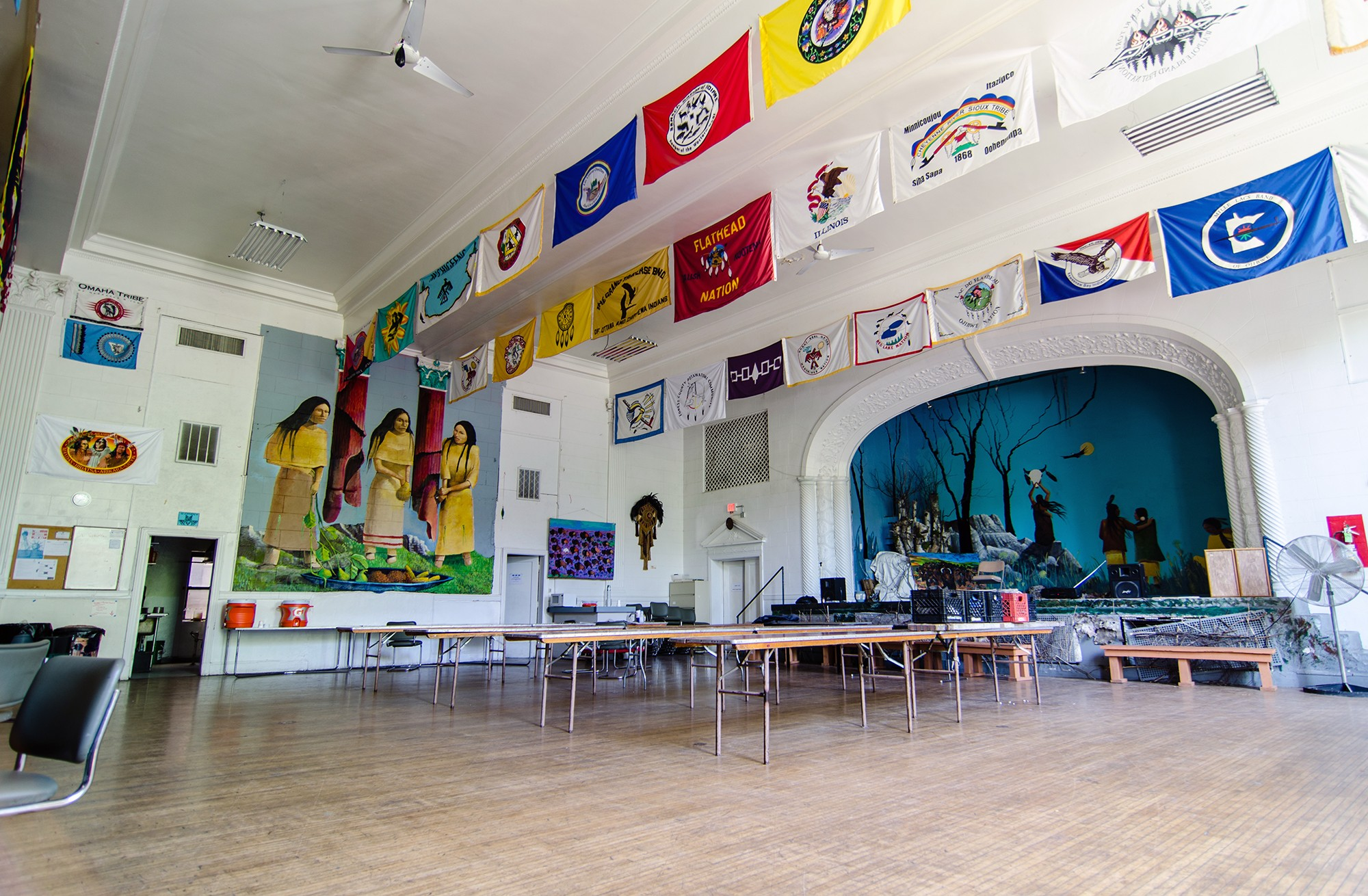
American Indian Center interior in the former home of the AIC in Uptown (1966–2018). Photo by Eric Allix Rogers, courtesy of the NAES College Collection at the Northwestern University Libraries

The center was planned as a response to an influx of native people into Chicago prompted by the Indian termination policy and the Indian Relocation Act of 1956, which sought to assimilate Native Americans into urban America. As noted by the AIC, "Native people from tribes throughout the country, arrived in Chicago. In addition to the Oneida, Ojibwa, Menominee, Sac and Fox, and Potawatomi of the north woods, Lakota, Navajo, Blackfoot, Papago, and many others were represented. The result was (and is) a multi-tribal community (including members of more than 50 tribes) searching for a common social and cultural ground." The center provided, and provides, a way for the people it serves to build community organizations and support in the city.

The center was founded in 1953 by Native Americans with assistance from the Quaker-affiliated American Friends Service Committee (AFSC). John Willard, the executive director of the AFSC in Chicago played a key role in organizing and raising funds for the project. From its start, the center has been overseen by the Native American members, from a variety of tribes, who make up its board. One of its longest-running social and educational programs is the annual pow-wow, and it has also organized study opportunities, exhibits, and conferences with academic institutions. The center has also collaborated with Chicago Public Schools to establish alternative education programs for Native American students, including Little Big Horn High School in 1971. In addition to its present center in Chicago, which opened in 1966, in 2005 it opened the Trickster Gallery in Schaumburg, Illinois, to showcase contemporary Native American artists. Trickster Gallery is no longer affiliated with AIC. The AIC is a member of the Chicago Cultural Alliance. Archery at the American Indian Center hosts a Junior Olympic and Adult Achievement program.

== Other legacies ==
The Native American Committee (NAC) in the city, which was the functional equivalent of the American Indian Movement organization in Chicago, began as a committee within the AIC, taking shape in 1969 to support the Occupation of Alcatraz by a protest group called "Indians of All Tribes." In May 1971, Robert Rietz, a 57-year-old anthropologist who had served as AIC executive director since 1958, died unexpectedly and without a clear successor, triggering a period of instability and conflict over the AIC's direction. A group of young AIC leaders who advocated more combative and confrontational rhetoric and tactics to advance self-determination, left the AIC and formed the beginning board and staff of the NAC. Many had come from the AIC's youth programs and educational committee, including Dennis Harper, Robert V. Dumont, William Whitehead, Faith Smith, Nancy Dumont, and Verdaine Farmilant. The NAC was central to the founding of the Native American Educational Services College in 1974, an influential institutional of higher learning managed by and serving Native Americans until 2005.

The AIC was also an early supporter of a protest to raise awareness of poor living conditions for Native Americans in Chicago, which began when, in early 1970, a Menominee woman named Carol Warrington, a mother of six, began a rent strike to pressure her landlord to improve the dilapidated conditions of her apartment. On May 5, 1970, her landlord evicted Warrington and her children from her apartment near Wrigley Field. Protestors using the name Chicago Indian Village (CIV) borrowed a ceremonial teepee from AIC, which became the symbolic center of a protest camp to demand and draw attention to the need for better housing for Native Americans in the city. But many members of the Center thought the protest should be brief and did not participate as CIV's protests continued through that year and into the next.
