= Red Power movement =

Native American youth movement

- Part of Civil rights movements
- Flag of the American Indian Movement
- Date: 1960s – 1970s
- Location: Mainly the United States, also Canada
- Caused by: Oppression of American Indians
- Goals: Recognition by US, American Indian awareness
- Methods: Occupations, Armed Struggle, Protest

Parties
Red Power Groups Armed Groups: American Indian Movement; Unarmed Groups: Lakota Freedom Movement; National Council on Indian Opportunity	Government of the United States: United States Congress; Bureau of Indian Affairs; Municipal Police; National Congress of American Indians

Lead figures
Dennis Banks; Clyde Bellecourt; Vernon Bellecourt	Government Leaders; Police leaders; Tribal governments

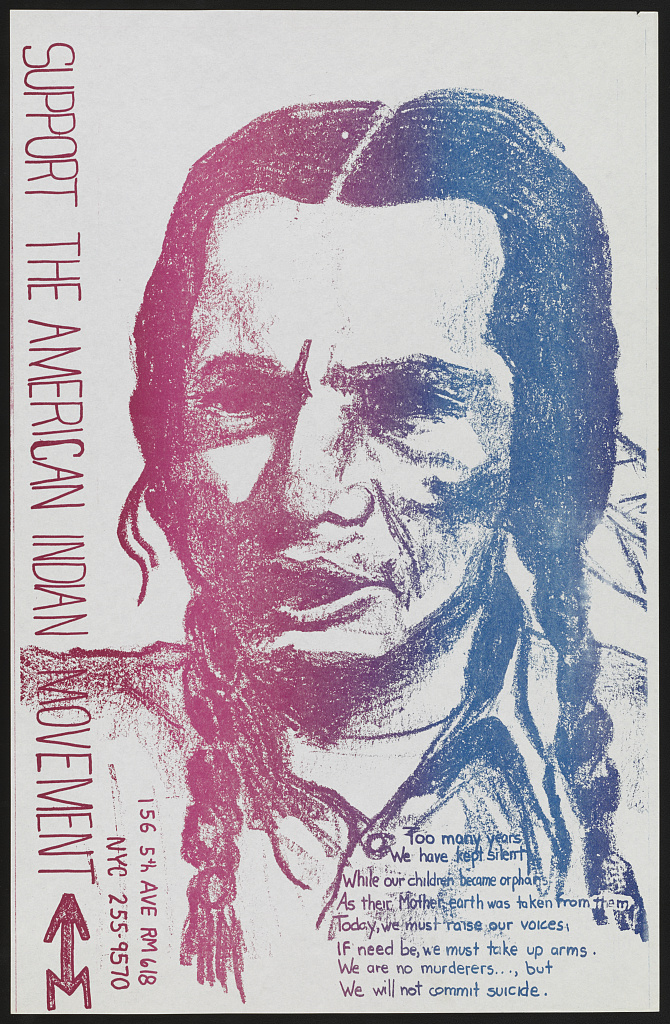
Poster use to support the Red Power Movement

The Red Power movement was a social movement which was led by Native American youth who demanded self-determination for Native Americans in the United States. Organizations that were part of the Red Power Movement include the American Indian Movement (AIM) and the National Indian Youth Council (NIYC). This movement advocated the belief that Native Americans should have the right to implement their own policies and programs along with the belief that Native Americans should maintain and control their own land and resources. The Red Power movement took a confrontational and civil disobedience approach in an attempt to incite changes in Native American affairs in the United States compared to using negotiations and settlements, which national Native American groups such as National Congress of American Indians had before. Red Power centered around mass action, militant action, and unified action.

The phrase "Red Power", attributed to the author Vine Deloria, Jr, was commonly used by Native Americans who developed a growing sense of pan-Indian identity with other American Indians in the United States in the late 1960s.

Some of the events which the movement was involved in throughout the era included the Occupation of Alcatraz, the Trail of Broken Treaties, the Occupation of Wounded Knee, and numerous intermittent protests and occupations. The lasting impression of the Red Power movement was the resurrection of American Indian pride, action, and awareness. Many bills and laws were also enacted in favor of American Indians in response to the Red Power movement, one of the most important being the reversal of tribe recognition termination.

== Early indigenous activism and the roots of Red Power ==
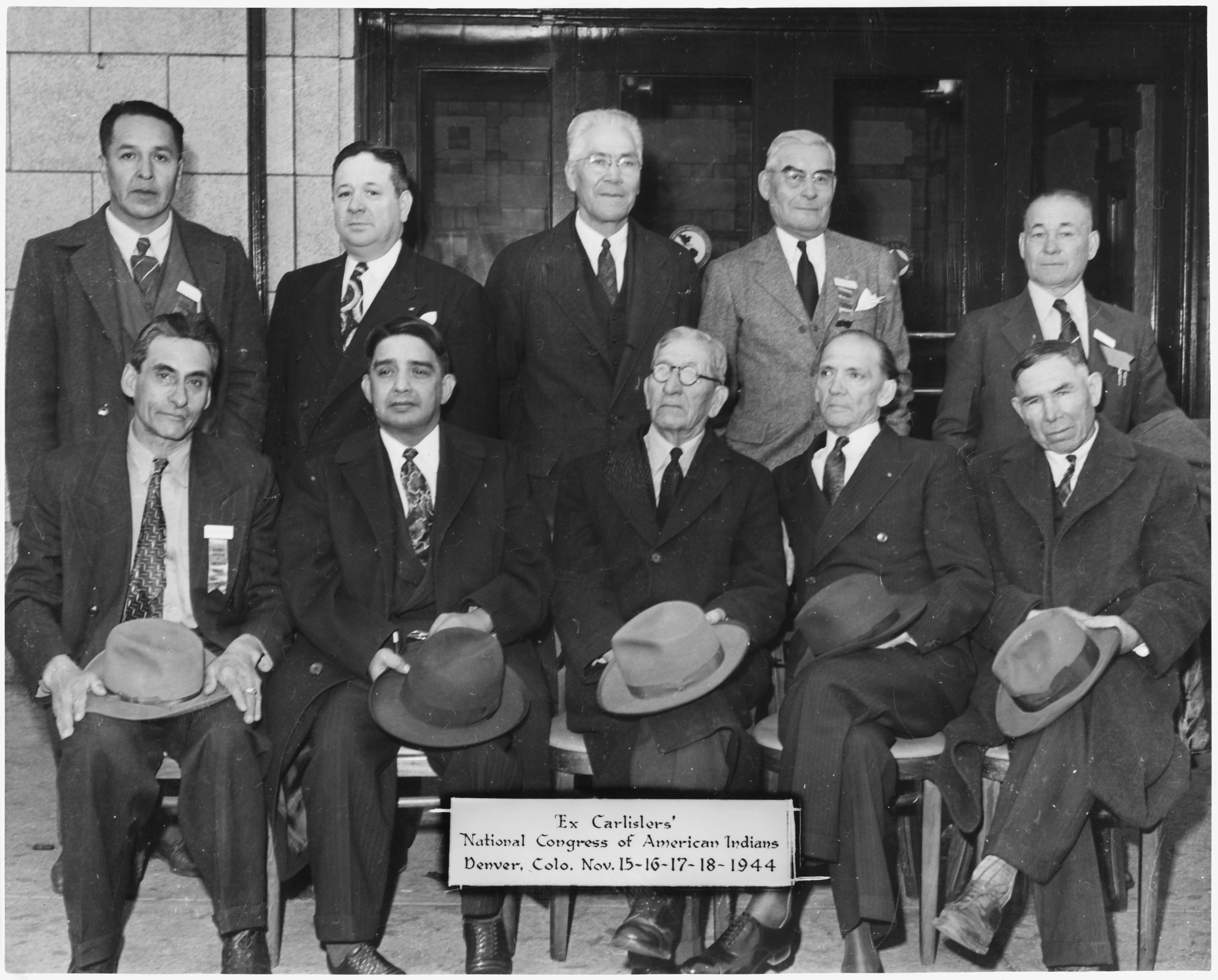
1944 Meeting of National Congress of American Indians

Although the Red Power movement is commonly associated with the late 1960s and early 1970s, its foundations were laid in earlier decades through Indigenous resistance to federal policies of termination and assimilation. Organizations such as the National Congress of American Indians (NCAI), founded in 1944, and the Association on American Indian Affairs (AAIA) played a crucial role in advocating for Native rights within the political system. These groups pushed back against policies that sought to dissolve tribal governments and assimilate Indigenous peoples into mainstream American society.

While these early efforts were often non-confrontational and reformist in nature, they were instrumental in cultivating a sense of pan-Indian identity and laying the groundwork for more radical forms of activism. During the 1950s and early 1960s, Native leaders participated in national political discourse, lobbying Congress, engaging in legal challenges, and organizing educational initiatives. These activities helped prepare a generation of young Indigenous activists who, inspired by the civil rights and Black Power movements, would later lead direct action campaigns under the banner of Red Power.

Scholars such as Daniel Cobb argue that the activism of this era should be seen not as separate from but as part of a broader continuum that culminated in Red Power. The movement's emergence was not a sudden rupture but rather a shift in strategy and tone, as Indigenous activists increasingly embraced direct action, media-savvy protest, and a more confrontational stance toward the federal government.

From 1953 to 1964, the United States government terminated recognition of more than 100 tribes and bands as sovereign dependent nations with the House Concurrent Resolution 108. This resolution stated that the tribes would be under US law and treated as American citizens instead of having the status as wards of the US. The affected tribes were no longer protected by the government and stripped of their right to govern their own people.

The Relocation Act of 1956 resulted in as many as 750,000 American Indians migrating to cities during the period from 1950 to 1980. This Act was implemented to encourage and provide support for American Indians to find jobs in cities and improve their lives from the poverty-ridden reservations. The government offered vocational training, housing, and financial support for those who chose to relocate. These promised amenities were often not provided or inadequately provided, resulting in American Indians distanced from their cultural lands and economically worse off than before.

The Relocation and Termination era described above fueled the resistance of American Indians. The oldest recognized National American Indian group was National Congress of American Indians (NCAI), established in 1944. NCAI set a precedent by successfully being the first multi-tribal political organization run entirely by Indians. NCAI fought against voting discrimination, against the termination of government to government relationship between the US and native tribes, and against US interference in tribal counsels. They aimed to close gaps between Indians who lived on reservations and those who had relocated to cities, elderly and Indian Youth, and different tribes from one another. NCAI was the main political organization that preceded the Red Power Movement.

Indigenous Movements play a crucial part in protecting the heritage of the Native American people. the resiliency of the indigenous people in their fight for justice. a significant accomplishment for the Native American people was the integration of the "United Nations Declaration on the rights of Indigenous People" or (UNDRIP) in 2007.

== Main organizations involved ==
=== American Indian Movement ===
At the forefront of the Red Power Movement was American Indian Movement (AIM), which was founded in 1968 in Minneapolis, Minnesota. Originally a movement that focused on responding to cases of racial profiling and police brutality which was the initial cause of their rise of recognition. Its members belonged to and mainly represented urban Indian communities, and its leaders were young and militant. Like the Black Panthers and the Brown Berets, AIM was initially organized for the purpose of advocating Indian civil rights in cities. Its members monitored the practices of law enforcement agencies, and they also attempted to document and prevent acts of police harassment and brutality. AIM soon played a major role in building a network of Urban Indian centers, churches, and philanthropic organizations. It helped establish the "powwow circuit," which publicized news about protest activities across the country. It is also working towards coordinating employment programs for people all around the United States. Skillful in attracting attention from the news media, AIM inspired local chapters and writing about American Indian political issues. By late 1972 and early 1973 –the height of its activism– the American Indian Movement had significantly changed and moved away from civil rights and urban issues towards treaty rights and reservation politics. During the 71-day occupation of the tiny hamlet of Wounded Knee, South Dakota, AIM declared the Independent Oglala Nation (ION) and set up a warrior society.

=== National Indian Youth Council ===
The National Indian Youth Council (NIYC) was founded in 1961 by young American Indian college students or recent graduates. Their original focus was to protect the rights of Indigenous people to hunt and fish. Over time, their methods changed to fight for Native American rights through direct action such as fish-ins and protests. This inspired the American Indian Movement (AIM) to utilize similar strategies. They were one of the first militant Indian rights organizations following the conservative ways of the NCAI. NIYC were strong opponents of the Bureau of Indian Affairs and were involved in many of the events in the Red Power Movement. Like AIM, the council advocated and fought for the recognition of tribes federally and the reinstatement of tribal governance.

The National Indian Youth Council (NIYC), also played a role in the Civil Rights Movement, their actions in the civil rights movement bought concerns of Native Indians into national racial justice conversations. in these actions Native Indian voices were heard in major social movements.

=== Women of All Red Nations ===
Women of All Red Nations (WARN) emerged in 1974 from the main founders, Lorelei DeCora Means, Madonna Thunderhawk, Phyllis Young, Janet McCloud, and others. WARN acted as a branch from AIM that focused on American Indian women's reproductive, family rights, and individual civil rights. WARN included millions of women from numerous different tribes. Not only these rights but also treaty rights that was inclusive of social, economic, and environmental. Main issues that WARN fought against were the forced sterilization of Native women and the lack of adequate health services on the reservations. WARN took action by becoming involved in Indian custody battles, protesting mining companies who were poisoning food and water sources, and collecting data on Indian women who had been sterilized without consent.

=== International Indian Treaty Council ===
The International Indian Treaty Council (IITC) was founded in 1974 in Standing Rock, South Dakota. More than 98 Indigenous tribes were represented by over 5000 people at this first gathering. IITC grew into a voice for Indians internationally—covering North, Central, and South America, the Caribbean, and the Pacific. IITC focuses on the pursuit of sovereignty and self-determination for indigenous peoples through activism, training, and unified gatherings. As the first indigenous organization to be granted Consultive Status by the United Nations Economic and Social Council (ECOSOC) in 1977, IITC was able to represent the concerns and fight for the acknowledgement of indigenous rights to the UN.

== Events ==
From 1969 to the Longest Walk of 1978, the Red Power Movement highlighted issues through social protest. Its goals were for the federal government to honor treaty obligations and provide financial "resources, education, housing and healthcare to alleviate poverty." The RPM wanted to gain Indian participation in social institutions; it was instrumental in supporting the founding of Indian colleges, as well as the creation of Indian studies programs at existing institutions, and the establishment of museums and cultural centers to celebrate Indian contributions.

The 1960s marked the beginning of a "Native American Renaissance" in literature. New books such as Vine Deloria, Jr.'s Custer Died for Your Sins (1969) and the classic Black Elk Speaks (1961), reprinted from the 1930s, reached millions of readers inside and outside Indian communities. A wide variety of Indian writers, historians, and essayists gained publication following these successes and new authors were widely read. N. Scott Momaday won the Pulitzer Prize for one of his novels and Leslie Silko received acclaim. Fiction and nonfiction works about Indian life and lore have continued to attract a large audience. Authors such as Louise Erdrich and Michael Dorris have earned continued recognition. Since the late twentieth century, novels by Sherman Alexie have been adapted for film as well.

=== Occupation of Alcatraz ===
The Occupation of Alcatraz began on November 20, 1969 when more than 80 young, mostly college aged American Indians, who identified themselves as Indians of All Tribes (IAT) boarded boats to approach and occupy Alcatraz Island overnight. The young American Indians settled with the legal backing of a Sioux Treaty that named any federal "out of use" land available for Indians. The US federal government had closed the Alcatraz federal prison and the island was no longer in use as of 1962. This treaty was used to send the message that treaties are still relevant and should be honored.

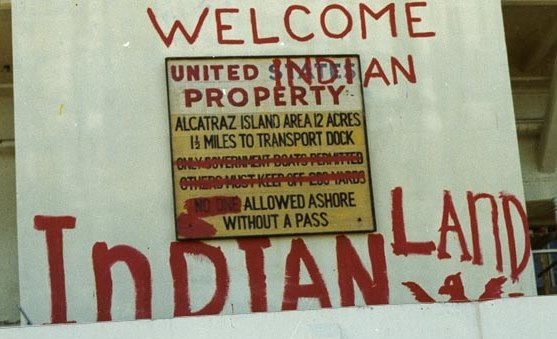
Sign in Alcatraz (1969)

The occupation had been planned ahead of time by Adam Nordwall, a successful Indian businessman, and Richard Oakes, a San Francisco State student. The two agreed to and told sympathetic media outlets about their plan to take over Alcatraz at a dinner party hosted by San Francisco Chronicle reporter Tim Findley. They threatened that if there were any leaks of the story early, the plan to occupy Alcatraz would be called off. Their first attempt, on November 9, 1969—the date the media had been told—resulted in circling the island in a boat with media coverage from all over the Bay Area. Although they did not begin the occupation that night, Oakes jumped off of the circling boat as others followed and swam to Alcatraz. After making it to Alcatraz, the young Indians were removed by Coast Guard that night but would be back in much larger numbers on November 20.

Excerpt From Alcatraz Proclamation

We feel that this so-called Alcatraz Island is more than suitable as an Indian Reservation, as determined by the white man's own standards. By this we mean that this place resembles most Indian reservations, in that: 1. It is isolated from modern facilities, and without adequate means of transportation.

2. It has no fresh running water.

3. The sanitation facilities are inadequate.

4. There are no oil or mineral rights.

5. There is no industry and so unemployment is very great.

6. There are no health care facilities.

7. The soil is rocky and non-productive and the land does not support game.

8. There are no educational facilities.

9. The population has always been held as prisoners and kept dependent upon others.

— Alcatraz Proclamation: To the Great White Father and All His People

During the occupation, IAT released a statement called the Alcatraz Proclamation which explained that the Indians had the right to Alcatraz Island due to the right to discovery. The Proclamation went on to describe the deserted prison island as comparable to the conditions of the Indian Reservations. IAT was also joined by National Indian Youth Council (NIYC) during the Alcatraz movement and the growing group of young, educated, and passionate American Indians made their presence known in the media. Richard Oakes became the public figure for the occupation and participated in the press conferences for releases of documents such as the Alcatraz Proclamation and goals for the island which included building cultural centers, educational facilities, and recreational spaces for Indians to be together as Indians.

The Occupation of Alcatraz ended after a series of disorienting events on the island. The January 1970 death of Richard Oakes' 13-year-old stepdaughter due to falling from a building brought Richard and his wife Anne back to the mainland. Some of the student occupiers went back to school when the Oakes' left. A problem of drug and alcohol abuse also became prominent on the island, which affected the occupation's reputation. The remaining leaders were John Trudell, LaNada Means, and Stella Leach, who could not end up agreeing on a way to further develop the occupation. Electricity and water being cut off to the island by May, and a suspicious fire that burned three buildings were further factors that led to the dismantling of the occupation. Protestors continued to depart from the island during the downward spiral. On June 11, 1971 a large number of police officers used force to remove the remaining few protestors.

Although the protesters ultimately failed to achieve their specific goals, they helped catalyze the Indian community. With the occupation of Alcatraz, a participant said, "we got back our worth, our pride, our dignity, our humanity."

=== Occupation of D-Q University ===
With young, college aged students at the center of many Red Power movement protests, the pursuit of higher education, particularly for American Indians became a main initiative. In 1970, while the Alcatraz occupation was still occurring, a group of Indian youth took over US military surplus land near Davis, California. These youth had applied for the land but were denied access after UC Davis was granted access, regardless of UC Davis' legally incomplete application. In retaliation, the Native American and Chicano student activists hopped the fences onto the property leading to the establishment and occupation of D-Q University. Named after Deganawidah, a peace-giver of the Iroquois Confederacy, and Quetzalcoatl, a Mesoamerican cultural hero, to symbolize unity between Native American and Chicano communities, D-Q University became the first Native American-controlled Indian-Chicano college in the U.S., embodying the Red Power movement's goals of cultural preservation and educational self-determination. D-Q University became the first tribal university that was established in California, and the first that was not affiliated with a single reservation. A deed was granted to the student occupation in April 1971. Since then, D-Q University became part of the Tribal Colleges and Universities and received accreditation in 1977. The curriculum of D-Q University included cultural and traditional focused education in order to educate Indians about Indians. The university struggled to keep enrollment rates up and secure funding, which resulted in the ultimate loss of accreditation in 2005. However, the occupation that created D-Q University highlighted the importance of higher education for American Indians to the Red Power Movement.

=== Trail of Broken Treaties ===
BIA seal

In August 1972, the Red Power movement continued under the direction of American Indian Movement(AIM) with the trail of broken treaties. The trail of broken treaties, a play on the "Trail of Tears," was the migration of seven caravans from areas across the west coast to the Bureau of Indian Affairs (BIA) in Washington D.C. The BIA had become widely associated with corruption and not acting in the best interest of the American Indians. The protestors started arriving in D.C. on November 1 with the intent of bringing a list of twenty demands to the BIA. Upon arrival, the activists and GSA security had a misunderstanding about the activists being housed in the BIA building. This resulted in the activists overpowering the security and taking over the building. The American Indians then barricaded the doors, with furniture from the BIA they had broken apart, and the occupation began on November 2, 1972. This occupation of the BIA had started the week before the presidential election, making a D.C. occupation the center of media attention. Threats of police force were used daily against the Indians if they did not come out. Supporters from outside of the occupation would come to the BIA to create a human barricade keeping the police from entering the occupied building. On November 6, a judge had given an order for the occupiers to vacate the building before 6 pm that day or they would be forcibly evicted. As the Indians braced for eviction, some exited the building to create a perimeter around it with clubs, spears and other weaponry to resist. Others inside the building were rumored to have guns and explosives awaiting the invasion of GSA officials. The spokesman of the occupation, Russel Means, spoke on the front stairs of the BIA explaining that the occupation would end when their demands had been met, and no time sooner. The deadline for the Indians to leave was pushed back yet again to November 8. Before this date, Indian lawyers had discovered evidence that would essentially abolish the BIA with exposure of corruption and misuse of the program. On November 8, the protestors left the BIA building with paintings, artifacts, and $2 million worth of damage.

=== Wounded Knee ===
The Wounded Knee Incident started on February 27, 1973 and lasted 71 days. More than 200 Indians in support of the Oglala Sioux people of Pine Ridge Reservation took over the town of Wounded Knee, South Dakota. The Oglala Sioux Civil Rights Organization (OSCRO), a group of mostly full-Indian women that lived on Pine Ridge Reservation had been unsuccessful in a trial to impeach Dick Wilson, who was the chairman of the Oglala Sioux Tribal Council. Critics of Wilson claimed he was too close to white people, too cozy with the government, and was disrespecting his Oglala Sioux culture. Enraged that Wilson had not been impeached, OSCRO continued to gather and brainstorm a response. They decided to ask AIM for help in reacting to what they felt was an injustice. With AIM in the picture, occupying Wounded Knee was their final decision.

Wounded Knee was chosen as a tribute to the Wounded Knee Massacre of 1890, where hundreds of Lakota Indians were killed by the 7th US Cavalry Regiment in reported efforts to disarm the Indians. As a historical remembrance of the massacre, the town had visitor trade posts dedicated to the grave sites of the Indians that many Indians thought were disrespectful and used for commercial purposes. The owners of the trade posts would sell native Indian crafts for more than they had bought them and had a history of racism towards the local Indians. The occupiers attacked the trade posts first to accumulate the ammunitions and weaponry that were held there. The occupation formed to deliver a message that American Indians would not sit around peacefully as treaties were broken, unfair trials were given, and their land was ceded. Federal agents gathered around Wounded Knee while the occupiers would host events for the media to cover in order to promote their message. Throughout the occupation of Wounded Knee, the protestors and federal agents would often have shootouts at night. The Indians would be shooting from inside Wounded Knee and the federal agents from the outside perimeter they had formed. From these shootouts, two Indians were killed and one federal agent was permanently paralyzed. The death of the second Indian, who was from the Pine Ridge Reservation and an Oglala Sioux, Buddy Lamont, led many Indians to seek an end to the violent occupation. On May 8, 1973 the American Indians surrendered to the surrounding federal agents after 10 weeks. Russell Means, one of the more recognized leaders of the AIM, negotiated with U.S. forces to release the hostages on the premises that the U.S. Senate Foreign Relations Committee hold hearings on the Indian treaties that were broken by the U.S. government as well as investigations of the Bureau of Indian Affairs and its members' attention to the living conditions at Pine Ridge.

On March 11, 1973, the occupiers declared the Independent Oglala Nation (ION) and set up a warrior society. The parallel and overlapping events speak of a nation-building project that was highly gendered.

This event is not only significant because it was one of the first violent acts initiated first by the Natives, but it also led to generations of Indians getting involved in civil rights and tribal affairs. The Nixon administration had earlier declared that it had wanted to end the "revolutionary Indian element", but because so many Natives took notice and began to make changes in the local governments controlling their reservations, the administration failed to end their protests and stopped trying to interfere.

Russell Means and Dennis Banks, the two AIM leaders mostly in charge of Wounded Knee II, were arrested immediately after the hostages were released. However, on September 16, 1973, the charges were dropped, and they were dismissed on the account that the U.S. government had unlawfully influenced witnesses and tampered with evidence. The violence of these types of protests then continued through the rest of the 1970s.

=== List of occupations by Red Power activists ===
The following is a list of occupations by Red Power activists:

- Occupation of Alcatraz- San Francisco, CA (1969)
- Occupation of Fort Lawton - Seattle, WA (1970)
- Occupations of Argonne National Laboratory, Wrigley Field, and Belmont Harbor Nike site - Chicago, IL (early 1970s)
- Occupation of Winter Dam- Winter, WI (1971)
- Occupation of abandoned Nike Missile Field- Richmond, CA (1971)
- Occupation of abandoned Coast Guard station- Milwaukee, WI (1971)
- Occupation of Alexian Brothers' Novitiate- Gresham, WI (1975)
- Occupation of BIA- Washington, D.C. (1972)
- Occupation of Wounded Knee- Wounded Knee, SD (1973)

== Legacy ==
The Red Power movement had accomplished many of its goals by the time direct social activism declined in the late 1970s. "By the early 1980s, over 100,000 Indian studies programs had been created in the United States. Tribal museums opened." "D-Q University (1971) pioneered Indigenous-led education, inspiring tribal colleges and language revitalization programs (Johnson review)." Among the most prominent of the cultural centers is the National Museum of the American Indian (NMAI), which was sponsored by Hawaii's senator Daniel Inouye and authorized by the US Congress in 1989. The NMAI opened on the Mall in Washington, DC in 2004. It also has a branch at the former US Customs House, on the Bowling Green in Lower Manhattan.

Many laws were passed in response to the Red Power movement, one of the most notable being the Indian Self-Determination and Education Assistance Act of 1975, which reversed the termination of federal tribe recognition. Restoring the recognition and government status of tribes, giving them control to govern their own tribes and reservations, with funding provided by the government if they followed certain guidelines. Since the termination of Indian tribe recognition was a major catalyst to start the movement, regaining recognition was considered a huge success for RPM.

The Red Power movement also continues to make an impact on modern day issues and events. The Dakota Access Pipeline protests - Wikipedia also known as the Standing Rock Protests or #NoDAPL were Native American protests that wanted to stop the construction of the Dakota Access Pipeline in the North area of the United States. The protest consisted of Indigenous groups, environmentalists, and allies of the cause who all wanted to prevent the construction from happening due to fear of water contamination and disrespecting historically significant lands also including their sacred lands. The protest went from April 2016-February 2017 after the National guard and law enforcement had forced it to an end. The connection between the two is about preserving the sovereignty of Native Americans and protecting the sacred lands from being destroyed by the government's actions while also bringing attention to treaty rights.

=== Laws passed in favor of American Indians during the Red Power movement ===
The following laws were passed during the movement:

- Indian Education Act of 1972 provided additional funds to school districts with high populations of Indian children
- Indian Health Service budget doubled from 1970 to 1975, which provided funding for Indian hospitals and clinics.
- Indian Self-Determination and Education Assistance Act of 1975 (ISDEAA) made self-determination the focus of government action. the ISDEAA reversed a 30-year effort by the federal government under its preceding termination policy.
- Northwest Indian Fisheries Commission (NWIFC) was established in 1975, as a result of fish-in protests. The NWIFC consists of members from 20 tribes who are recognized as natural resources co-managers with the State of Washington.
- Indian Health Care Improvement Act of 1976 was passed by Congress to improve the health-care system for American Indians. This act includes scholarships for American Indians who are looking to pursue studies in medicine, dentistry, psychiatry, nursing and pharmacy.
- American Indian Religious Freedom Act was passed in 1978 and terminated the outlaw of Indian religious practices such as sun dance, bear dance, and the use of sweat lodges.
- Branch of Acknowledgement and Research (BAR) was created by the BIA in 1978 to process applications from tribes for federal recognition. BAR was never federally approved, but still is in control of recognizing Indian tribes.
- Indian Child Welfare Act was passed by Congress in 1978. This act was in response to years of the BIA placing Indian children in boarding schools away from their reservations. It allows tribes to have some control over adoption and placement of Indian orphan children.
- Tribally Controlled Community College Assistance Act of 1978 authorized community colleges to exist on reservations

== See also ==
- American Indian Movement
- Asian American activism
- Black Lives Matter
- Black nationalism
- Black Power movement
- Black separatism
- Chiapas conflict
- Chicano movement
- Civil Rights Movement
- Civil rights movements, worldwide
- Contemporary Native American issues in the United States
- History of civil rights in the United States
- Human rights in the United States
- Native American civil rights
- Native American genocide in the United States – the notion that Native Americans have been subjected to genocide throughout their history because of racism against them, an aspect of racism in the United States
- Secession in the United States
