= Urban Indian =

Native Americans who live in urban areas

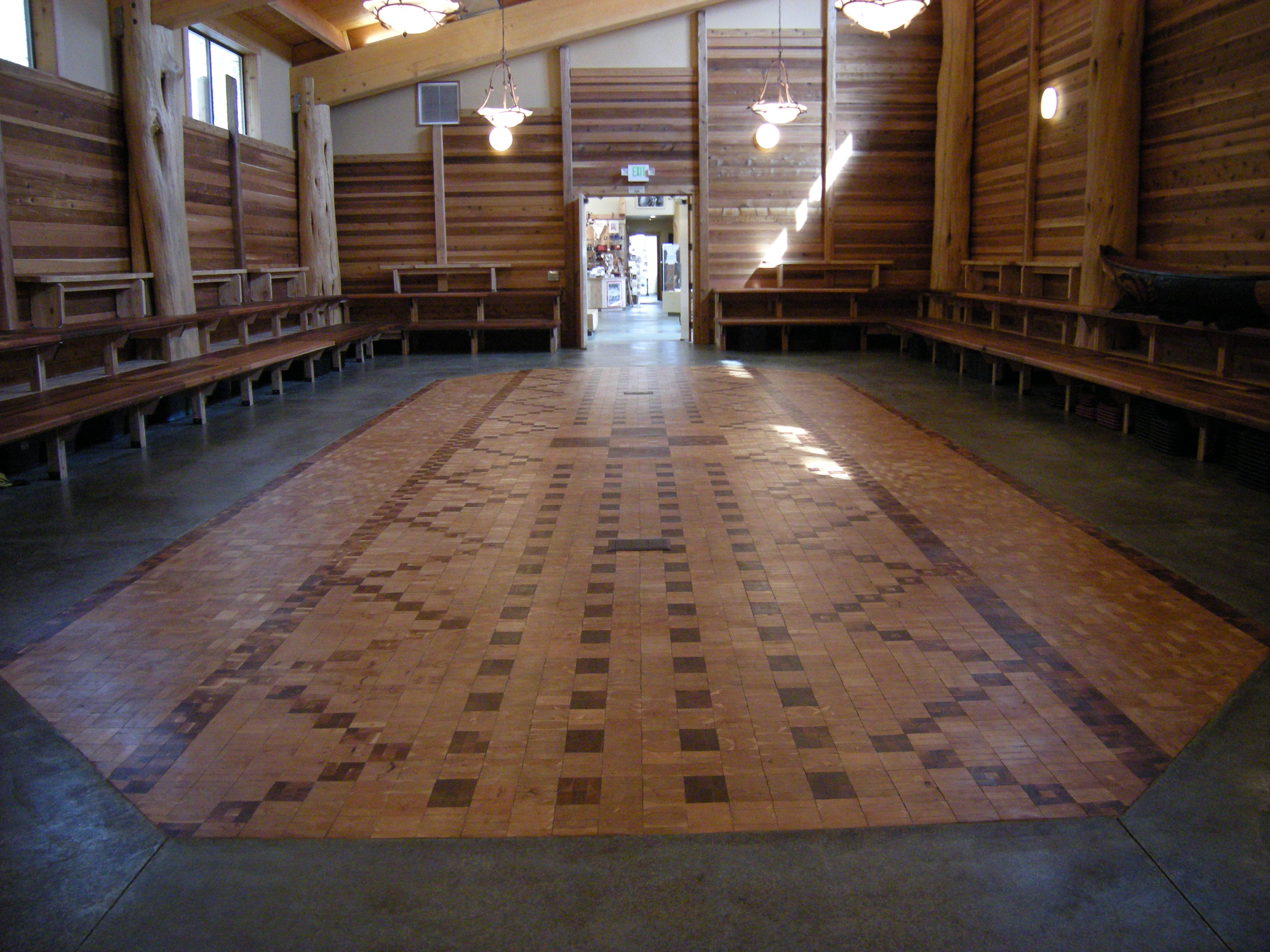
The Duwamish Longhouse and Cultural Center opened in 2009 in Seattle near the shore of the Duwamish River, less than a hundred meters from the Duwamish tribe's one-time Herring's House village.

Urban Indians are Native Americans and Canadian First Nations peoples who live in urban areas. Urban Indians represent a growing proportion of the Native population in the United States. The National Urban Indian Family Coalition (NUIFC) considers the term to apply to "individuals of American Indian and Alaska Native ancestry who may or may not have direct and/or active ties with a particular tribe, but who identify with and are at least somewhat active in the Native community in their urban area."

As defined by NUIFC, urban Indians may variously be permanent residents including long term residents, forced residents, or medium and short term visitors. Long-term residents are those who have been in a city for multiple generations. Some are descendants of the people who traditionally owned land that has been developed as an urban center. Forced residents are those who were forced to relocate to urban centers by government policy or by the need to access specialized health or other services. Medium and short-term visitors are in a city to visit family or friends, to pursue an education, etc. The term "forced residents" is a contested term.

Urban Indian populations are largely concentrated in cities in the Western United States and parts of the Midwest, with a few exceptions. Major U.S. cities with large Native American populations include Los Angeles, Tulsa, Oklahoma City, Phoenix, Salt Lake City, Anchorage, Seattle, Portland, Tucson, Albuquerque, Chicago, and Minneapolis. Canadian cities with large First Nations populations, most of which are in the Prairie Provinces and Western Canada, include Vancouver, Winnipeg, Edmonton, Calgary, Saskatoon, Regina, and Thunder Bay.

== History ==
The number of American Indians living in urban settings accelerated in the 1950s and 1960s because of the Indian termination policy of that era, which encouraged Native people to leave their reservations. During that period, the Bureau of Indian Affairs (BIA) also developed a "relocation" program that encouraged American Indians to move to urban areas. While Native people were not "forced" to move, the BIA has been criticized for promoting unduly optimistic portrayals of life in urban areas. Many Native people were simply unprepared for the challenges of city life, they often encountered discrimination and had difficulty getting jobs and housing, and many returned to their reservations. The program was abolished in the 1970s. Since that era, however, many American Indians have moved to urban areas by their own choice and without any assistance from the BIA. The 2000 US Census indicated that 67% of Native Americans lived in urban areas, and by the 2010 Census the percentage of urban Native people had grown to 71%.

Much of the scholarly literature of the 1970s and 1980s focused on the great hardships that Native Americans encountered in urban areas, and especially the failure and abuses of the BIA's Relocation Program. But, more recent scholarship has demonstrated that Native people were resourceful and able to adapt to the demands of urban living just as poor European immigrants had done in the 19th century. This scholarship is represented by Douglas K. Miller's Indians on the Move, James LaGrand's Indian Metropolis, Joan Weibel-Orlando's Indian Country, L.A., and Shawnee-Sac and Fox-Seminole-Muscogee Creek scholar Donald Fixico's Urban Indian Experience in America. Regarding prior negative stereotypes about adjustment, Native scholar Fixico has stated,

"This downtrodden image does not accurately portray urban Indians, particularly in the 1990s when at least three generations have survived the relocation years of the 1950s and 1960s. The early image misrepresents the urban Indian population to an unfortunate degree, since many Indian citizens in cities hold professional positions and are members of the middle class in America." (p. 27).

Charles Wilkinson, a legal scholar and author of Blood Struggle, has stated:

"Relocation fell into disfavor because of the coercion and ineffectiveness, but one bright light began to shine years later. Although relocation provided few benefits to the people it directly served, many of their children, having grown up in the cities, helped build the Indian professional middle class, which played a central role in revitalizing Indian life in the latter part of the twentieth century." (p. 85)

Wilma Mankiller, former Principal Chief of the Cherokee Nation, is a good example of the Indian professional middle class raised in an urban area. Mankiller relocated with her parents in the 1950s to the San Francisco Bay Area. She states in her autobiography, "We were not forced to do anything . . . our poverty had prompted the move. In 1955, my father first started talking to the Bureau of Indian Affairs officials about the various forms of assistance for Cherokees. Relocation was a possibility." (p. 68-69) Relocation was difficult for the young Wilma, but she later attended San Francisco State College and learned techniques of community organization in the political climate of the Bay Area in the 1970s. She took these skills back to the Cherokee Nation in Oklahoma and has assisted with revitalization there.

Anthropologist James Clifford has argued that, although many Native Americans and other Indigenous peoples live in urban settings away from their ancestral homelands, this does not necessarily mean that their connection to those lands are severed. He points out that many Native Americans travel back and forth between cities and rural communities, and maintain active ties to their ancestral lands even while not occupying them full times. Clifford argues that this suggests that even for urban indigenous populations, the relations to ancestral homelands may be highly significant. This relation may take on a different meaning for them than for the people who inhabit their homelands continuously.

== Current issues ==
Cherokee scholar Russell Thornton, a demographer and professor at UCLA, has pointed out that Native Americans tend to intermarry with non-Indians at an increasing rate. He attributes this, partially, to the increased urbanization of the Native American population. "Continued urbanization is likely not only to result in increased intermarriage as more and more Native Americans come in contact with non-Native peoples, but also to diminish further the identity of Native Americans as distinctive tribal peoples tied to specific geographical areas." Although there are issues facing urban Indigenous communities such as intergenerational expressions of violence against women or manifestations of marginalization in the form of substance abuse, urban Indigenous communities are not severed from their histories or cultures but rather finding new ways to revitalize what was lost and stand up to centuries of policies aimed at erasure.

== Statistical measurements of health and quality of life ==
It is difficult to get a reliable number for the urban Indian population. In 1999, Kenneth Prewitt, director of the United States Census Bureau estimated that the US Census undercounted American Indians and Alaska Natives by just over 12 percent.

The number of urban Indians is increasing. The 1970 census showed 62 percent of people who identified as American Indians or Alaska Natives living on Indian reservations or other Native lands; the 2000 census showed that number down to 39 percent. The highest concentration of Urban Indians is believed to be in Anchorage, Alaska, where over 10 percent of the population identify in the Census as having some Native ancestry, with 7.3 percent identifying that as their only ancestry.

Urban Indians suffer from many of the same health problems as Natives on reservations. Rates of prenatal care are lower than on reservations, and rates of infant mortality are higher. Compared to the general population, urban Indians have:

- 38 percent higher rates of accidental deaths
- 54 percent higher rates of diabetes
- 126 percent higher rates of liver disease and cirrhosis
- 178 percent higher rates of alcohol-related deaths.

Social indicators show a similar pattern.

- A poverty rate of 20.3 percent, compared to a general urban poverty rate of 12.7 percent.
- An unemployment rate 1.7 times higher than the general urban population.
- Homeownership less than 46 percent, compared to 62 percent for non-Indians.
- Their homes (owned or rented) are significantly more likely to lack plumbing facilities (1.8 times more likely than non-Indian urban residents), kitchen facilities (2 times more likely) and telephone service (more than 3 times more likely).
- 1.7 times less likely to have a high school diploma than non-Indians.
- Three times more likely to be homeless than non-Indians.
- A higher rate of child abuse and neglect (5.7 cases per 1,000 children per year, vs. 4.2 for the total U.S. population).

== See also ==
- American Indian Center
- History of Native Americans in Baltimore
- Indian colony
- Little Earth
- Native American hip hop
- There There, a 2018 novel about urban Indians in Oakland, California
- Urban Māori
- Urban Indian reserve
- Council of Three Rivers American Indian Center, Pittsburgh
