= Choctaw Youth Movement =

Choctaw nationalist grassroots movement

Choctaw Youth Movement Ilhkoli Chahta Himmita
- Abbreviation: CYM
- Leader: Charles E. Brown
- Founded: 1969; 57 years ago
- Dissolved: c. 1975; 51 years ago
- Preceded by: OKChoctaws
- Succeeded by: Choctaw National Council
- Headquarters: Oklahoma City, Oklahoma
- Newspaper: Hello Choctaws
- Ideology: Choctaw nationalism Social conservatism Cultural revitalization Anti-termination; Anti-Pan-Indianism
- Political position: Centre-right to right-wing
- Religion: Protestantism
- Colors: Blue White Red

The Choctaw Youth Movement (CYM) was a Choctaw nationalist grassroots movement born in the late 1960s in response to efforts by the federal government to terminate the Choctaw Nation. It was formed, in part, as a tribal-centric movement to counter the Pan-Indianism of other Native rights groups, such as the American Indian Movement. As opposed to AIM, the Choctaw Youth Movement practiced non-confrontational, peaceful activism, and advocated cultural revitalization and the re-adoption of tribal language, and taking pride in the distinctness of being Choctaw. The defense of the tribal culture and history took precedence over maintaining inter-tribal alliances.

== Background of activism ==
The late 1960s movements followed in the footsteps of a half-century of Native American activists. One of the first, a group which founded the Society of American Indians in 1911 in Columbus, Ohio worked for nearly two decades before disbanding in the 1930s. They advocated for the protection of Indian legal and cultural rights and the dissolution of the Bureau of Indian Affairs.

In 1944 another group of Native leaders came to Denver, Colorado to form an organization to protect the rights of tribal communities. The organization they founded, the National Congress of American Indians, advocated for tribes to work together focusing on commonalities, not tribal differences. One of the founding members, Ben Dwight, served as the Tribal Attorney for the Choctaw Nation and was one of the parties who had negotiated the final sales price of the coal and asphalt lands.

In 1961 a conference was held in Chicago, Illinois with educators and anthropologists, and frustrated Indians from 13–20 June which produced a “Declaration of Indian Purpose: the Voice of the American Indian” – a policy created for Indians by Indians. They delivered the policy to President John F. Kennedy, but went on to form the National Indian Youth Council (NIYC) in Gallup, New Mexico later that summer, to translate words into actions. The founding members of NIYC – Herbert Blatchford, Navajo Nation; Gerald Brown, Flathead Indian Reservation of Montana; Sam English, Ojibwe; Viola Hatch, Arapaho of the Cheyenne-Arapaho Tribe of Oklahoma; Joan Nobel, Ute; Karen Rickard, Tuscarora; Melvin Thom, Walker River Paiute Tribe of the Walker River Reservation, Nevada; Clyde Warrior, Ponca Tribe of Indians of Oklahoma; Della Warrior, Otoe-Missouria Tribe of Indians of Oklahoma; and Shirley Hill Witt, Mohawk – included 3 members from Oklahoma. Although NIYC claimed to have hundreds of members, a core group of ten to fifteen people shaped the organization. Unlike African American or white dissident groups, it included women in its leadership and focused on honoring their elders, not breaking with tradition. In other words, the "generation gap" existed, but not with the past, rather with the current regimes of assimilationists.

These early attempts at Native American activism, the unrest of the 1960s, the birth of the Red Power Movement and the American Indian Movement coalesced into a youth awakening at the opening of the 1970s in Oklahoma. The Choctaw Youth Movement was not the only Native American dissident group in Oklahoma at this time, but Choctaw activism had a lasting impact on the tribe.

== Birth of the movement ==
As the 1960s emerged, a growing sensitivity to minority rights was born, spurred by Supreme Court decisions such as Brown v. Board of Education, Gideon v. Wainwright, Loving v. Virginia and legislation including the Voting Rights Act of 1957, the Civil Rights Act of 1964, the Voting Rights Act of 1965 and the Fair Housing Act if 1968. Into this turbulent time, a pan-Indian movement developed predominantly with the goals of having the US government return native lands, right social ills, and provide funds for cultural education. The Red Power Movement and American Indian Movement were both born out of this pan-Indian awakening, which was, at least in the beginning, an urban phenomenon, an awareness of ones "Indian-ness" and the similarities of tribal customs. In cities, cut off from the tribe, one still experienced things that bound them to other native people because of an innate oneness of tribal behavior and kinship of tradition. After years of being told that relocation to cities would help them assimilate into the greater society, Native American experience was non-acceptance, isolation, and paternalism, which led them to each other for a sense of connection. In just such an environment, young Choctaw activists began awakening in Oklahoma City, Oklahoma.

In 1969, one year before the US government's Indian termination policy was scheduled to go into effect for the Choctaw Nation (officially 25 August 1970), Jim Wade, son of Talihina's police chief, told Charles E. Brown, that the government was dissolving the Choctaw tribe. Alarmed, and believing that most Choctaw did not realize that the bill Congress passed on 25 August 1959, known as "Belvin's law," was a termination bill rather than a per capita payment bill, Brown began organizing other urban Choctaw, primarily in the Oklahoma City area. Going door to door and working kinship networks, young Choctaw activists spread the word that the termination bill needed to be stopped and urged people to take pride in their Choctaw heritage. By October, 1969, activists had secured the support of Oklahomans for Indian Opportunity (OIO) and from OIO they learned leadership training, how to recruit, and were introduced to contacts in the Red Power and AIM Movements.

Brown founded a group, with his primary organizers—Ed Anderson, Floyd Anderson, Robert Anderson, Alfeas Bond, Darryl Brown, Bobbi Curnutt, Dorothy D’Amato, Carol Gardner, V.W. “Buster” Jefferson, Vivian Postoak and Carrie Preston—called OKChoctaws, Inc., which initially was for Choctaw living in the OKC metro area. The group's growth was so rapid, they could not continue to meet in each other's homes and rented a space from the Creek Nation on 34th Street in Oklahoma City. Within two years, what had begun as an urban initiative, saw a shift in power from OKC to the Choctaw Nation homelands as youth joined local organizations in large numbers and assumed leadership positions.

== Efforts to block termination ==
Activists printed a newsletter called Hello Choctaws which styled itself as the voice of the “average Choctaw,” and regularly questioned Principal Chief Harry J. W. Belvin’s actions. “For over 20 years the AVERAGE CHOCTAW has not known how much of his tribal land was sold or how much it was sold for. Government ‘appointed’ people had the power to sell the AVERAGE CHOCTAW’S TRIBAL LANDS without the AVERAGE CHOCTAW even knowing that his lands were being sold or how much they were being sold for.” They began sending Hello Choctaws to relatives and kin contacts in California, Chicago, Dallas and around the US. Soon chapters of OKChoctaws began springing up throughout the traditional towns in the Choctaw Nation: Antlers, Atoka, Bethel, Broken Bow, Hugo, Idabel, McAlester, and Talihina, as activists traveled there and spoke to young people.

Activists made calls, sent telegrams, and wrote letters of protest. They lobbied Congress, writing to every single member, met with the Oklahoma legislative delegation and staff at the Bureau of Indian Affairs office in Muskogee and Washington, DC. An anti-termination petition was circulated, collecting signatures through kin networks. When the Secretary of the Interior spoke at Will Rogers Park in Oklahoma City, several hundred Choctaw attend and let him know they did not want their tribe to be terminated. They also used their networks with the OIO to gather groups of people for community activities, such as organizing discount bulk purchases with grocers in the form of buying clubs and educational meetings to teach political activism. Belvin, though he was on the Board of Directors of the OIO, increasingly saw these activities as "militant" and a direct challenge to tribal authority.

== Long term effects ==
The modern flag of the Choctaw Nation, which was adopted by the tribe following self-determination in the 1970s.

It is hard to judge the effectiveness of the Choctaw Youth Movement in actually overturning the termination legislation. It is clear that the activists felt Belvin was in favor of termination and that he was a traitor to tribal objectives. It is equally clear that Belvin felt that activists were personally attacking him and that he scheduled meetings throughout the Choctaw Nation to justify his actions. Public sentiment was changing with the passage of the Indian Civil Rights Act of 1968, the Supreme Court ruling in the Menominee Tribe v. United States decision and even President Lyndon B. Johnson was advocating for policy which "ends the old debate about "termination" of Indian programs and stresses self-determination". Belvin had been speaking publicly and pressing legislators to overturn the termination legislation for at least 2 years and he was a proponent of tribes having the autonomy to elect their own leadership. In those goals, he and the youth activists were not far apart, as, after stopping termination, one of the activist's primary goals was the ability to elect their own tribal chief. Activists saw the BIA appointment of their leadership as an infringement on their identity as a sovereign people.

Where Belvin and youth activists differed was that Belvin seemed to see the tribe as a simple corporate entity whose role was to manage tribal assets. Activists saw the tribe as a multifaceted organization which spurred community development and fostered Choctaw identity. What the movement did in unequivocal terms was foster pride in being Choctaw and brought about a rebirth in Choctaw nationalism.
