= Viola Hatch =

Native American activist from Oklahoma

- Wo'teenii' ehisei

Southern Arapaho leader
- In office 1994–1995

Personal details
- Born: February 12, 1930 Geary, Oklahoma, U.S.
- Died: April 22, 2019 (aged 89) Canton, Oklahoma, U.S.
- Spouse: Donald Vernon Hatch (1929–2013)
- Nickname: Wo'teenii' ehisei (Blackbird Woman)

Viola Hatch (Arapaho: Wo'teenii' ehisei; February 12, 1930 – April 22, 2019) was a Native American activist, founding member of the National Indian Youth Council, and former tribal chair of the Cheyenne and Arapaho Tribes. She successfully sued the Canton, Oklahoma, schools regarding the right of students to obtain an education.

== Early life ==
Viola Sutton was born February 12, 1930 to Arapaho chief and Mennonite pastor Harry Arthur Sutton (1907–1978) and Sallie Blackbear Sutton (1912–1988) on her grandmother's allotment near Geary, Oklahoma. Around 1938, the family left Geary and returned to the Canton area where Sutton's father had an allotment which he inherited from his grandmother, Red Face.

She was raised on the family allotment with her siblings: Cora Mae Sutton Scabbyhorse Querdibitty (1932–2010), Patricia Ann Sutton Walker (1935–1997), Nancy Ruth Sutton (1937), Lavonta Sutton Kenrick (1939), former Arapaho chief William Ray "Billy" Sutton (1940–2015), Charlene Sutton Lime (1943–2013), Arthur Warren Sutton (1945–1945), Wilda Jean Sutton Allen Gould (1947), Georgia Mae Sutton Roberts (1948–2010), former Arapaho chief Allen D. Sutton (1950), Ava Dushane Sutton Benson (1954), and Marcella Dawn "Marci" Sutton Armijo (1967).

Sutton attended school in Canton and then the Concho Indian Boarding School. Concho was a vocational training school based on a military-style discipline model. While the students did study the same curriculum as public school students by the time Sutton attended, it was a working farm and the students were expected to care for the livestock and cultivate the gardens. The purpose of boarding school education was to teach girls "life skills," such as cooking and cleaning, and Christianity, to rid children of their pagan beliefs. Frustrated by insistence that she be trained for domestic work, Sutton abandoned further education and moved to Chicago as part of the Bureau of Indian Affairs Relocation Program. She found work at the Spiegel Company, which was operating as predominantly a mail-order clothing and home accessory company.

== Activism ==
As the 1960s emerged, a growing sensitivity to minority rights was born, spurred by Supreme Court decisions such as Brown v. Board of Education, Gideon v. Wainwright, Loving v. Virginia and legislation including the Voting Rights Act of 1957, the Civil Rights Act of 1964, the Voting Rights Act of 1965 and the Fair Housing Act if 1968. Into this turbulent time, a pan-Indian movement developed predominantly with the goals of having the US government return native lands, right social ills, and provide funds for cultural education. The Red Power Movement and American Indian Movement were both born out of this pan-Indian awakening, and Viola was involved from the beginning.

While Viola was in Oklahoma, she was a Native American activist who sued the Canton School over her son Buddy and won, allowing him to wear his hair long. Viola Hatch was a member of the following organizations: American Indian Movement, board member of the National Indian Youth Council, Cheyenne & Arapaho Elder board member, Southern Arapaho language advisory board, Bear Butte forum, lead walker and organizer for the Family & Mother Earth Walk.

She had returned from Chicago and married Donald Hatch, a union organizer. Hatch opened senior and youth centers, worked with the homeless and VISTA volunteers, and urged political involvement by native peoples. She became involved in both local and national level organizations for Indian rights. Hatch also worked as a field operative for Oklahomans for Indian Opportunity (OIO), an organization developed by LaDonna Harris (Comanche) under the federal Office of Economic Opportunity programs.

The creation of the OIO was the first effort in the state of Oklahoma for the western plains tribes in the state to work with the Five Civilized Tribes. Field operatives, like Viola, began organizing tribal Head Start Programs, programs to deal with high Indian drop-out rates, native economic development programs and tribal human services.

=== National Indian Youth Council ===
In 1961, a conference with over 800 participants was held in Chicago, Illinois with educators and anthropologists, and frustrated Native Americans from 13 to 20 June which produced a "Declaration of Indian Purpose: the Voice of the American Indian" – a policy created for Indians by Indians. They delivered the policy to President John F. Kennedy, but went on to form the National Indian Youth Council (NIYC) in Gallup, New Mexico later that summer, to translate words into actions. The founding members of NIYC – Herbert Blatchford, Navajo Nation; Gerald Brown, Flathead Indian Reservation of Montana; Sam English, Ojibwe; Viola Hatch, Arapaho of the Cheyenne-Arapaho Tribe of Oklahoma; Joan Nobel, Ute; Karen Rickard, Tuscarora; Melvin Thom, Walker River Paiute Tribe of the Walker River Reservation, Nevada; Clyde Warrior, Ponca Tribe of Indians of Oklahoma; Della Warrior, Otoe-Missouria Tribe of Indians of Oklahoma; and Shirley Hill Witt, Mohawk – included 3 members from Oklahoma. Although NIYC claimed to have hundreds of members, a core group of ten to fifteen people shaped the organization. Viola has continued to serve on the board from the inception through 2015.

The goals of the National Indian Youth Council from the beginning were to honor and preserve the customs and lives of Native people. Their focus includes preserving traditional religious practices and sacred sites; elimination of barriers to full political participation by native citizens; promotion of public education for tribe members which honors Indian contributions to the overall culture and respects positive image reinforcement of native traditions, customs and people; employment training and placement; protection of treaty rights, including tribal sovereignty, hunting and fishing rights and environmental conservation; and promoting international coordination and support for protection of the rights of indigenous people throughout the Western Hemisphere.

=== American Indian Taskforces ===
When Nixon was elected in 1968, Indian activists were unsure of what his policies would be, in spite of campaign promises. They remembered the termination policies of his Republican predecessors and demanded a clear policy proving that self-determination had arrived. The president-elect requested that native leaders compile a document briefing him on policy, their desires and solutions, needs, and priorities. From January to February, 1969 a task force met and prepared the document, which would become the basis of the Special Recommendations on Indian Affairs delivered by Nixon on 8 July 1970. After completion of the report, the task force which was composed of "many of the best known Indian leaders in the country," including Hatch one of only six women on the task force, met in Washington, DC in November 1969 to present their ideas. On 10 November, they met with Vice President Spiro Agnew and on 12 November, they presented the statement to Congress. Their recommendations were that Indians needed to be involved in their own governance, be consulted, be allowed to design and implement processes, and be able to express their grievances and propose legislative and policy solutions. They asked for their sovereignty to be respected, for state governors to be required to honor treaties and federal statutes, and they asked for Congress to establish a system of redress so that if federal programs, which were designed for the benefit of Native Americans, were not in fact benefiting them, there would be mechanisms to obtain justice.

A second task force, also created in 1968, by the American Indian Policy Review Commission was charged with review of federal Indian law and policy to make recommendations of obsolete laws for repeal, consolidations of redundant provisions, or amendments of existing provisions to provide conformity throughout the US Code. Hatch, Frances Wise, Roberta Black and numerous other native leaders reported on the failures of the Department of Justice and the FBI to respond and/or investigate civil rights abuse claims by Indians against state and local law enforcement officers. The task force concluded its work in 1976 and made a full report to Congress.

From June through August, 1974, a task force of Indian law students, Indian lawyers, and tribal representatives, assessed how tribal legal systems could be utilized to strengthen tribal governing bodies and implement judicial decisions. There were only three participants from Oklahoma on the task force—Hatch was the sole tribal representative and two Cherokee Nation student participants, Robert Steven Lowery and David Ricketts-Kingfisher. Seventeen reservations were visited with the goal of determining how to best implement the newly passed Indian Self-Determination and Education Assistance Act. As administration of a wide range of government services which had previously been carried out by federal agencies were to become the responsibility of the tribes, the report was a first step in determining tribal readiness to do so. The analysis was an important one, as previously the federal government had been responsible for the complexities of overlapping jurisdictions of Indian Affairs. As tribal governing bodies moved to assume those roles, they had to be aware of state, federal, and municipal implications, as well as treaty provisions. The report highlighted numerous deficiencies in tribal governing documents and tribal court systems and recommendations for eliminating those deficiencies.

=== American Indian Movement (AIM) ===
The American Indian Movement (AIM) was founded in 1968 by a group of Anishinaabe that included Dennis Banks, Mary Jane Wilson, George Mitchell, and Pat Ballanger. In 1969, while visiting the Occupation of Alcatraz, Banks, recruited John Trudell (Santee Sioux), who became AIM's primary spokesperson for the next decade and Russell Means (Oglala Lakota), who became AIM's primary strategist. As many as a dozen chapters sprang up in Oklahoma in the 1970s, led by Carter Camp (Ponca). The goals of the movement were self-determination of tribal people and development of a framework to address the critical issues —racism, illness, poverty, high unemployment, sub-standard housing, inadequate educational opportunities, and abrogation of treaty agreements— facing them.

On 12 September 1972, about forty to fifty Indians from the AIM movement, including Camp and Hatch, took over the office of the state Indian Education director, Overton James (Chickasaw) in Oklahoma City, to protest the way federal money for Indian education was allocated. In Oklahoma, about 150 school districts having 10 percent or greater American Indian enrollment, annually received $2 million from the Johnson-O'Malley subsidies. The activists claimed the funds were being spent on the general expenses of schools and not specifically for native students. Negotiations with the BIA broke down and the facility was occupied until 14 September, when a compromise was reached to freeze spending on Johnson-O'Malley funds for the fiscal year until an external audit of the expenditures could be undertaken.

Partly because of her involvement with AIM, but partly through her work with the OIO, Hatch was sent a few months after the BIA incident to take charge of a situation which had developed in the schools at Hammon, Oklahoma. Because of long-standing prejudice against native students, lack of desire to preserve native heritage or even present it in a positive light, little support from administrators, high dropout rates, and improper use of Johnson-O'Malley subsidies in the Hammon Public School System, Cheyenne students and their parents were in favor of creating the Institute for the Southern Plains. Barney Bush (Shawnee) and other AIM activists came to the support of parents and students in their standoff and boycott of the Hammon Schools. Peggy Dycus (Sac & Fox) was in charge of running the Southern Plains School, but she had trouble obtaining utilities, or even a house to rent, as she had been branded as an AIM radical. The Hammon Public Schools were opposed to creation of the new school, as they were under pressure to keep up their own enrollment or lose both the Johnson-O'Malley funds and run the risk of being consolidated with another school district. The Institute's goal was to teach students in their own Cheyenne language, with teachers who were mostly Cheyenne and understood the cultural identity of their students. Hatch obtained a grant of $30,000 from the BIA, which enabled 65 students of all ages to enroll in the Institute. They graduated three students in 1974, before the institute was forced to close.

=== Wounded Knee ===
In January 1973, Dennis Banks began gathering AIM members for a major civil rights campaign to expose corruption on the Pine Ridge Indian Reservation, the poverty and broken treaties there, as well as several uninvestigated deaths. On February 28, 1973, about 150 activists, including Don and Viola Hatch, who were to hold a press conference that morning at Wounded Knee, woke to find that they were surrounded by Guardians of the Oglala Nation (GOONs), who had been sent by the newly elected president of the Oglala Sioux, Dick Wilson. The GOONs were soon joined by FBI personnel and some 60 members of the U.S. Marshals Special Operations Group brought in by the Bureau of Indian Affairs.

The 71-day occupation of Wounded Knee had begun. The AIM activists were unprepared for armed conflict or a lengthy siege, and had to negotiate for food, clothing and arms to be smuggled in to the encampment. By 7 March 1973, 300 Marshals, 100 FBI agents, 250 BIA SWAT team agents, 150 GOONs and 150 non-Indian vigilantes had amassed to intercept and thwart any movement of goods or people into the compound. Nightly meetings were held by the activists to update them on what was happening and they would sing, drum, and pray. Don Hatch recounted Henry Crowdog, who adopted Hatch into his family, playing his guitar and singing Lakota songs. Eventually, electricity, water and food supplies were cut off by federal marshals and national guardsmen, in an attempt to break the standoff. Under heavy gunfire, Frank Clearwater, a Cherokee, and Buddy LaMonte, an Oglala Lakota, were killed. On 7 May 1973, the occupation ended when federal officials agreed to investigate the Wilson regime, abuses on the reservation, and treaty violations.

In 1998, Viola returned to South Dakota on the 25th anniversary of the event to participate in the Commemoration of Wounded Knee. Two days of festivities were held, honoring those who had been there in 1973 — those who had passed on and those who were still living — renewing ties and holding educational meetings.

=== Hair-length and school appearance protest ===
On 20 September 1972, Viola's son, Buddy Hatch, was expelled from the fifth grade by his school principal because his haircut did not meet the school dress and appearance code. Hatch filed a civil rights lawsuit claiming that the hair-length rules of the school "violated their parental rights to raise their children according to their religious, cultural, and moral values". The United States Court of Appeals for the Tenth Circuit determined that hair length was not a constitutionally protected federal question and "should be handled through state procedures". Like other challenges before it, Hatch's case, arguing for free speech and free exercise of religion, failed because the law requires proof that a clearly established tenet of the religion exists, not just a preference or custom.

However, the 10th Circuit did remand the case back to the lower court to further evaluate the allegations of violations of the Establishment Clause and whether the Hatch's son was dismissed without proper hearing in violation of due process. Disciplinary measures taken by schools cannot interfere with the right of a child to obtain an education per the Universal Declaration of Human Rights. The case was resolved with Hatch claiming victory in setting a "fairness" precedent for students.

=== Repatriating Native remains ===
In 1989, the National Congress of American Indians (NCAI) held a conference to request that the Smithsonian Institution return and repatriate nearly 19,000 remains from Native Americans. Tribal representatives acknowledged that while anthropological studies of the skeletal remains could provide important and beneficial scientific information, once measurements and samples have been completed, they wanted the remains returned to their proper resting places. Hatch was vocal about tribal repatriation of ancestors and worked with other Indian leadership to secure the passage of the Native American Graves Protection and Repatriation Act of 1990.

=== Walk for Survival ===
In the midst of her federal trial, Hatch continued her activism, organizing the Women's Healing Walk for Family and Mother Earth from Los Angeles, California to St. Augustine, Florida. The walk took place from 11 February – 11 July 1996 and was made in remembrance of the Indian prisoners that were incarcerated at Fort Marion Prison in Florida. Between 1875 and 1878, 72 Cheyenne, Kiowa, Comanche, Caddo and Arapaho leaders and their families were interned in the prison and by the 1880s they were joined by hundreds of Apaches as prisoners of war. Two years after George Armstrong Custer's defeat at the Battle of Little Bighorn, the first prisoners were finally allowed to leave.

The walk was the first such commemoration of the native prisoners by Indian people and also focused on cleansing rites to protest nuclear dumping and desecration of burial mounds and other sacred sites. The closing ceremony at the Wind River Indian Reservation in Wyoming featured the Arapaho Sundance.

=== Bear Butte Defenders ===
In May 2002, the City of Sturgis, and a group of private businessmen, submitted an application to Governor William Janklow for community development funds to build a sports complex and shooting range about 4 miles north of Bear Butte, a sacred place used for thousands of years by the Arapaho, Cheyenne, Sioux, and 30 other tribes for ceremonial purposes. Janklow approved the application and authorized funds of $825,000 from Housing and Urban Development (HUD) funds without obtaining consultation from the tribes or verifying that the proposal met requirements of the National Historic Preservation Act for National Historic Landmarks, or the National Environmental Policy Act.

In 2003, the Northern Cheyenne, Rosebud Sioux, Crow Creek Sioux, Yankton Sioux tribes and Defenders of the Black Hills filed for an injunction in a Rapid City, South Dakota U.S. District Court to halt the project and the spending of federal funds for it. Viola and her husband Don were among the coalition of defenders to protect Bear Butte and participated in the demonstrations. In December 2003 HUD funds were returned and in January 2004 the project was abandoned.

In February 2006, a long-term planning meeting of the Intertribal Coalition to Defend the Bear Butte, met in Sturgis, South Dakota with international partners, tribal members and leadership, and other supporters to develop strategies to protect the sacred site. Hatch and her husband attended as representatives for the Southern Cheyenne and Arapaho tribes. A Mato Paha Preservation Fund was organized as were several meetings and celebrations to educate tribes throughout the Great Plains region regarding preservation efforts.

=== Longest Walks ===
On the 30th anniversary of the original Longest Walk, a five-month walk from San Francisco, California to Washington, DC, a walk was sponsored by Dennis Banks to raise environmental awareness. The original walk began on 11 February 1978, with nearly 2,000 participants and ended in Washington DC on July 15, 1978. Almost two dozen people had walked the entire 2,700 miles in an event that had been planned by the AIM Movement to protest 11 pieces of legislation. More than 100 Native American tribes supported the walk and its goals of protecting tribal sovereignty, native land rights and indigenous water and environmental rights. For the 2008 walk, which traveled through Oklahoma from 3 May to 13 May, Viola served as the lead walker, Oklahoma coordinator, and hosted a benefit dance to honor Banks and her husband Don Hatch.

In 2012, the Longest Walk III, walkers left Alcatraz Island on 18 December 2011 and arrived in Washington, DC on 18 May 2012. Hatch hosted the walkers at her home in Canton, Oklahoma on 1 April 2011. The third Walk, was focused on the plight of the 36-year incarceration of AIM member Leonard Peltier.

The 2013 Longest Walk IV reversed the path of the previous walks and left Washington, DC on 15 July 2013 and arrived at Alcatraz Island on 21 December 2013. The purpose of the fourth Walk was to reaffirm tribal sovereignty and the spiritual relationships with native lands. Hatch and her family again supported the Oklahoma portion of the walk.

== Tribal Officer ==
In 1982, Hatch was elected as vice chair of the Business Committee of the Cheyenne and Arapaho Tribes. She also served on the business committee from 1982 to 1983, 1984 to 1985, 1988 to 1989, 1990 to 1991, and 1992 to 1993. From 1987 to 1988 Hatch served as vice chair of the tribes. She was elected as treasurer for the 1989–1990 term and although not elected to the office, continued to serve as treasurer and sign tribal documents at the direction of the business council in 1990 and 1991. Hatch was elected and served as Tribal Chair from 1994 to 1995.

=== Tribal Taxation Authority ===
In 1988, Hatch, along with other members of the business council were sued by a consortium of oil and gas producers, who alleged that the Cheyenne and Arapaho Tribes' 1988 statute imposing a severance tax on oil and gas production on all lands in the Tribal jurisdiction was invalid because it included allotted lands of tribal members. On 3 January 1994, the Tribal Supreme Court ruled that the "territorial jurisdiction encompasse[d] all allotted lands." The oil and gas interests appealed the case to the U.S. Western District Court for Oklahoma in an action styled Mustang Fuel Corp. v. Hatch. The court upheld the right of the tribes to tax lands allotted in 1890 stating, "The allotted lands were validly set apart for use of the Tribes' members at that time and have continually been in federally protected status. Therefore, the Tribes can validly impose a tax on the valuable oil and gas development taking place on those lands as a source of revenue to fund tribal services within their territory". It was an important procedural victory for native people and has been used as a basis for other tribal disputes with oil and gas entities and tribal land use applications.

=== Gaming Ordinance ===
During Hatch's tenure as chair, the tribe submitted a tribal gaming ordinance, which was approved by the National Indian Gaming Commission (NIGC). Shortly thereafter, the Lucky Star Casino was built in Concho. By 2004, the tribe had expanded to a second casino in Clinton, Oklahoma and by 2015 their gaming enterprises encompassed 5 casinos. Indian Gaming has become a major income source to both the tribe and the state of Oklahoma.

=== Federal prosecution ===
In March 1995, Hatch was removed from office, as she, a former state senator, and two other past tribal officers, including Juanita Learned, of Cheyenne-Arapaho tribes were named in a 32-count federal indictment alleging they conspired to embezzle tribal funds. An audit by the Interior Department in 1992 had claimed that hundreds of thousands of dollars had been misused by the tribal business committee resulting in the near bankruptcy of the tribes. Hatch was one of the tribal chairs accused and had served as treasurer when the alleged discrepancies occurred. The actual indictment alleged that approximately $18,000 was falsely filed between January 1989 to December 1991.

In July 1995, in a federal courthouse in the U.S. Western District Court at Oklahoma City, Hatch and the other tribe members were indicted on charges of embezzlement, conversion, and conspiracy. The alleged travel expenditure violations were based on $734 of federal funds spent by Hatch, which were investigated over a 3-year period at a cost of several hundred thousand dollars by the federal government. The embezzlement and conspiracy charges were dismissed for lack of evidence. Hatch was convicted of receiving funds for conferences she did not attend and sentenced to 12 months in prison. She was convicted of "conversion" which legally means that she had lawfully come into possession of the funds but then afterwards illegally used the funds.

Her conviction was appealed to the Tenth Circuit Court of Appeals in Denver, Colorado and overturned. According to court documents, while there were irregularities and a lack of oversight protections in the processing of travel expense claims, the government's allegations that Hatch ever possessed the funds were unsubstantiated. The government based its claim on the fact that as treasurer Hatch had access to tribal funds and a fiduciary responsibility over them; therefore, she had "ownership" of funds. However, the appellate court ruled that Hatch did not have sole discretionary use, as signatures of the business manager, the business committee chairman, and the comptroller were required for her to disburse any funds. The laxity of the business committee operations allowed overpayment of expenses, without any method of tracking double-payments, but did not constitute that Hatch knew overpayments were occurring or that she had discretionary authority over tribal funds. Her sentence, along with those of the others accused, was vacated by the 10th Circuit Court of Appeals.

== Personal life ==
In addition to her activism, Hatch volunteered as a cultural and heritage speaker for schools, libraries, and other organizations. She attended schools at Canton and Concho boarding schools where she was a part of the BIA relocation program. Hatch then relocated to Chicago, where she worked for the Spiegel Company. She served on the Southern Arapaho Language Advisory Board and is an honored elder board member of the Cheyenne and Arapaho Tribe. She participated in Women of All Red Nations and the Arts & Crafts Cooperative. Hatch was involved with Bob Dotson's production at KWTV News of the documentary Till It's Here No More.

Hatch traveled to international indigenous rights meetings and participated in the United Nations Forum in Geneva, Switzerland, which developed the Declaration on the Rights of Indigenous Peoples. She met with the Ambassador to the European Union for the Sacred Sites meeting in a trip to Ireland and Northern Ireland.

Hatch married Donald Vernon Hatch (November 9, 1929 – August 7, 2013) on June 5, 1954. She died on April 22, 2019, in her home, surrounded by her family. At time of her death, Hatch had 4 children, 6 grandchildren, and 16 great-grandchildren.

== See also ==
- List of Native American politicians
- Native American women in politics
