= Lorenzo Beard =

Native American painter

Lorenzo Beard Horse Chief
- Mo'éhno'ha Ȯhvéhonevėstse
- Born: 1914
- Died: 1975
- Citizenship: Cheyenne and Arapaho Tribes, United States
- Education: Santa Fe Indian School
- Occupation: painter

"Ghost Dancers," 1936

Lorenzo Beard (1914 – 1975), also called Horse Chief (Cheyenne: Mo'éhno'ha Ȯhvéhonevėstse), was a Cheyenne-Arapaho American painter whose subjects included buffalo and ceremonial figures. His work has been exhibited across the world, including at the National Gallery of Art and as part of the University of Oklahoma's European Tours in the 1950s. Beard's artwork has been in the permanent collections of institutions including the University of Oklahoma Museum of Art and the Southwest Museum of the American Indian.

Beard attended the Concho Indian Boarding School as a child and graduated from the Santa Fe Indian School. He often painted in the flat Studio style typical of Santa Fe's students. Scholar Oliver La Farge described Beard's painting "Women's Buffalo Dance" as having an "interestingly primitive and strongly symbolic quality."
