= Brent Learned =

Southern Cheyenne painter

- Haa-Naa-Jaa-Ne-Doa
- Born: Haa-Naa-Jaa-Ne-Doa; Oklahoma City, Oklahoma, United States
- Citizenship: Cheyenne and Arapaho Tribes, United States
- Education: BFA University of Kansas
- Known for: Painting, drawing, printmaking, sculpture, installation
- Notable work: My Mother, Biixoo3é3en
- Mother: Juanita L. Learned
- Website: buffalobullhowling.com

Brent Learned (Cheyenne name: Haa-Naa-Jaa-Ne-Doa) is a Native American painter whose art is known for rustic impressionistic style depicting Native American themes.

He is Southern Cheyenne and enrolled in the Cheyenne and Arapaho Tribes.

== Early life and education ==
Brent Learned was born to John Learned and Juanita L. Learned in Oklahoma City, the eighth of their ten children. His mother was Cheyenne, while his father, a sculptor, was an American of German, French, and English descent. He was introduced to art as a child, watching his father sculpt and drawing in his studio. He attended Northwest Classen High School, graduating in 1988.

Learned earned a Bachelor of Fine Arts from the University of Kansas in 1993.

== Style ==
Learned is a painter and sculptor who "depicts the Native American Indian in a rustic impressionistic style" and "is typically known for his use of bold vibrant colors". He "tries to create artwork to capture the essence, accuracy and historic authenticity of the American Plains Indian way of life". However, Learned also aims to portray Native Americans in modern contexts; he noted in a 2019 interview, "When people think of Native American art, they think of a guy on a horse, or hunting a buffalo, or a woman in a teepee … I want you to look at my work and say, ‘Oh my god, he goes outside the boundaries".

Some of Learned's work are reimagining of paintings by European artists - such as Klimt, Matisse, Monet, Picasso, and Van Gogh - with Native American subjects.

Learned's work also incorporate satire and pop influences.

== Professional career ==
At University, he studied under professors who were more focused on abstract art. He studied impressionism, but upon graduation, he took the advice of his mother and began to paint his heritage. He threw himself into Cheyenne art, interviewing elders and studying the history of his people.

He began to submit his work to native galleries and festivals, and in 2000, he had a painting selected for the "Winter Camp: Honoring the Legacy" exhibit at the National Cowboy Hall of Fame.

In 2020, Learned worked with several other Native American artists to design posters on COVID-19 prevention.

In 2022, he painted a mural depicting the Sand Creek massacre.

=== "Come and Get Your Love" video ===
In 2020, Learned collaborated on the official music video for Redbone's 1974 hit "Come and Get Your Love". Directed by Juan E. Bedolla, the animated short film offers a contemporary look into Native American culture through the eyes of a time-traveling protagonist. Learned served as the creative producer for the project.

=== Prey end titles ===
Learned contributed to the end title sequence of the 2022 film Prey, a prequel to the Predator franchise. Collaborating with Filmograph, he worked alongside other Native American artists to create historically accurate hide art, which was then animated and included in the film's closing visuals.

== Collections ==
His artwork was featured in several prestigious institutions, including the Smithsonian Institution's National Museum of the American Indian in Washington D.C., the National Cowboy and Western Heritage Museum in Oklahoma City, and the Cheyenne/Arapaho Museum in Clinton, Oklahoma. Additionally, his pieces are part of private collections such as the Governor's Mansion in Oklahoma City and the Kerr Foundation.

== Awards and honors ==
- Red Earth, Second Place, Painting, June 2010
- Artist Exhibitor in ï¿½The Oklahoma Experienceï¿½ at Disneyï¿½s Epcot, Oct 2007
- SWAIA Santa Fe Indian Market, Second Place Mixed Media, August 2007
- Eiteljorg Museum Indian Market, Second Place, Drawing, June 2007
- Cahokia Mounds Annual Contemporary Indian Art Show, First Place Painting, July 2007
- Eiteljorg Museum Indian Market, Honorable Mention, Mixed Media, June 2006
