= Northwest Classen High School =

High school in Oklahoma City, Oklahoma, US

Location
- 2801 Northwest 27th Street; Oklahoma City, (Oklahoma County), Oklahoma 73107; United States; 35.4983919°N 97.5633735°W

Information
- Motto: You-Knighted by Pride and Loyalty
- Established: September 2, 1955; 71 years ago
- School district: Oklahoma City Public Schools
- Principal: Sunie Killam
- Teaching staff: 98.51 (FTE)
- Grades: 9–12
- Enrollment: 1,902 (2023-2024)
- Student to teacher ratio: 19.31
- Colours: Purple; Gold
- Sports: Baseball • basketball • cheerleading • cross country • football • soccer • softball • tennis • track and field • volleyball • wrestling
- Mascot: Bedivere (Knight of the Round Table)
- Team name: Knights
- Newspaper: The Shield
- Website: https://nwclassen.okcps.org/
- Last updated: March 28, 2019; 7 years ago

Northwest Classen High School is a public high school serving students in grades 9–12 in Oklahoma City, Oklahoma.

== History ==
Northwest Classen High School was built in 1955 to accommodate the growing population in the northwest corridor of Oklahoma City. Along with Classen School of Advanced Studies, it was named for Anton H. Classen, an early Oklahoma City real estate developer and philanthropist.

As the neighborhoods around Northwest Classen have changed, so has the cultural makeup of the campus. Initially an almost all-Caucasian school, the population has gradually become more multi-cultural. Today, the enrollment in the school is predominantly Hispanic with about 1/2 as many African-American and 1/4 Caucasian students with almost 100 different races and cultures represented.

== Hudson Performance Hall ==
The original auditorium was, along with the rest of the school, targeted for upgrades and renovation as part of Oklahoma City's "MAPS for Kids" program in 2010. After meeting in the auditorium, local businessman and alumni J. Clifford Hudson and his wife Leslie donated $500,000 in additional funds to install updated sound and lighting technology, improve the acoustics and update the audience area for the site. Now named the "Hudson Performance Hall", the venue has held concerts by notable acts such as Vince Gill (also an alumnus), Al Yankovic, Arlo Guthrie, and Sinbad.

== Extracurricular activities ==
Northwest fields teams in Oklahoma Secondary School Activities Association–sanctioned competition in baseball, fast-pitch softball, football, cheerleading, cross country, volleyball, basketball, tennis, wrestling, golf, soccer, and track.

Northwest is host to an active JROTC (Army) program. Clubs include a chess club, multicultural club, history club, native-American student services club, Anime club, and a dance team.

== Notable alumni ==
- William A. Martin (Class of 1956) – Computer Scientist, Artificial Intelligence Pioneer
- Edward Ruscha (Class of 1956) – Artist
- Mason Williams (Class of 1956) – Recording Artist
- Susanna Talley Clark (Class of 1957) – Songwriter, artist and wife of Guy Clark
- Henson Cargill (Class of 1959) – Recording Artist
- Gary Nixon (Class of 1959) – Professional motorcycle racer, AMA Grand National Champion (1967 and 1968), member of AMA Motorcycle Hall of Fame and Motorsports Hall of Fame of America.
- Ron Norick (Class of 1959) – Former mayor of Oklahoma City
- Jerry C. Elliott High Eagle (Class of 1961) – Physicist and engineer. Recipient of Presidential Medal of Freedom
- Ronald Fagin (Class of 1963) – Computer Scientist, Author of Fagin's theorem
- Steven T. Kuykendall (Class of 1965) – Member, US House of Representatives, California's 36th congressional district from 1991 to 2001.
- Elizabeth (Herring) Warren (Class of 1966) – United States Senator from Massachusetts, Democratic Party presidential candidate. Special Advisor to U.S. Treasury Secretary Timothy Geithner while establishing the Consumer Financial Protection Bureau. Professor, Harvard Law School.
- Kirk Humphreys (Class of 1968) – Former Mayor of Oklahoma City
- Skip Bayless (Class of 1970) – Sports Broadcaster
- Matthew T. Mason (Class of 1970) – Roboticist
- Rick Bayless (Class of 1971) – Chef and restaurateur
- J. Clifford Hudson (Class of 1973) – Chairman and chief executive officer of Sonic Corp.
- Vince Gill (Class of 1975) – Recording Artist
- Sean O'Grady (Class of 1977) – World Boxing Association Lightweight
- Walter Emery Fountain (Class of 1980) – Major General, United States Army
- Kevin Thornton (Class of 1987) – Recording Artist (member of Color Me Badd)
- Bryan Abrams (Class of 1988) – Recording Artist (member of Color Me Badd)
- Mark Calderon (Class of 1988) – Recording Artist (member of Color Me Badd)
- Brent Learned (Class of 1988) – Native American Artist with works in the Smithsonian and many other collections
- Sam Watters (Class of 1988) – Recording Artist (member of Color Me Badd)
- Jabee Williams (Class of 2001) – Recording Artist
- Darnell Jackson (Class of 2003, transferred) – Former NBA Basketball Player

== Order of the Round Table Hall of Fame ==
In 2018, the Friends of NWC High School Foundation instituted a Hall of Fame with annual inductions.

- Cliff Hudson (Class of 1973, inducted 2018) – Chairman, Sonic Corporation; Chairman, Oklahoma City School Board (2001–2008)
- Ron Norick (Class of 1959, inducted 2018) – Mayor, Oklahoma City (1987–1998)
- Vince Gill (Class of 1975, inducted 2018) – Recording artist

2019 Inductees were:

- Skip Bayless (Class of 1970) – Sports columnist and television personality
- Jerry C. Elliott (Class of 1961) – Physicist and engineer. Recipient of Presidential Medal of Freedom for his role in the recovery of the Apollo 13 astronauts.
- Mason Williams (Class of 1956) – Musician, composer, comedian, comedy writer. Winner of both Grammy and Emmy awards.
