= National American Indian Heritage Month =

Annual commemorative month honoring Native American culture

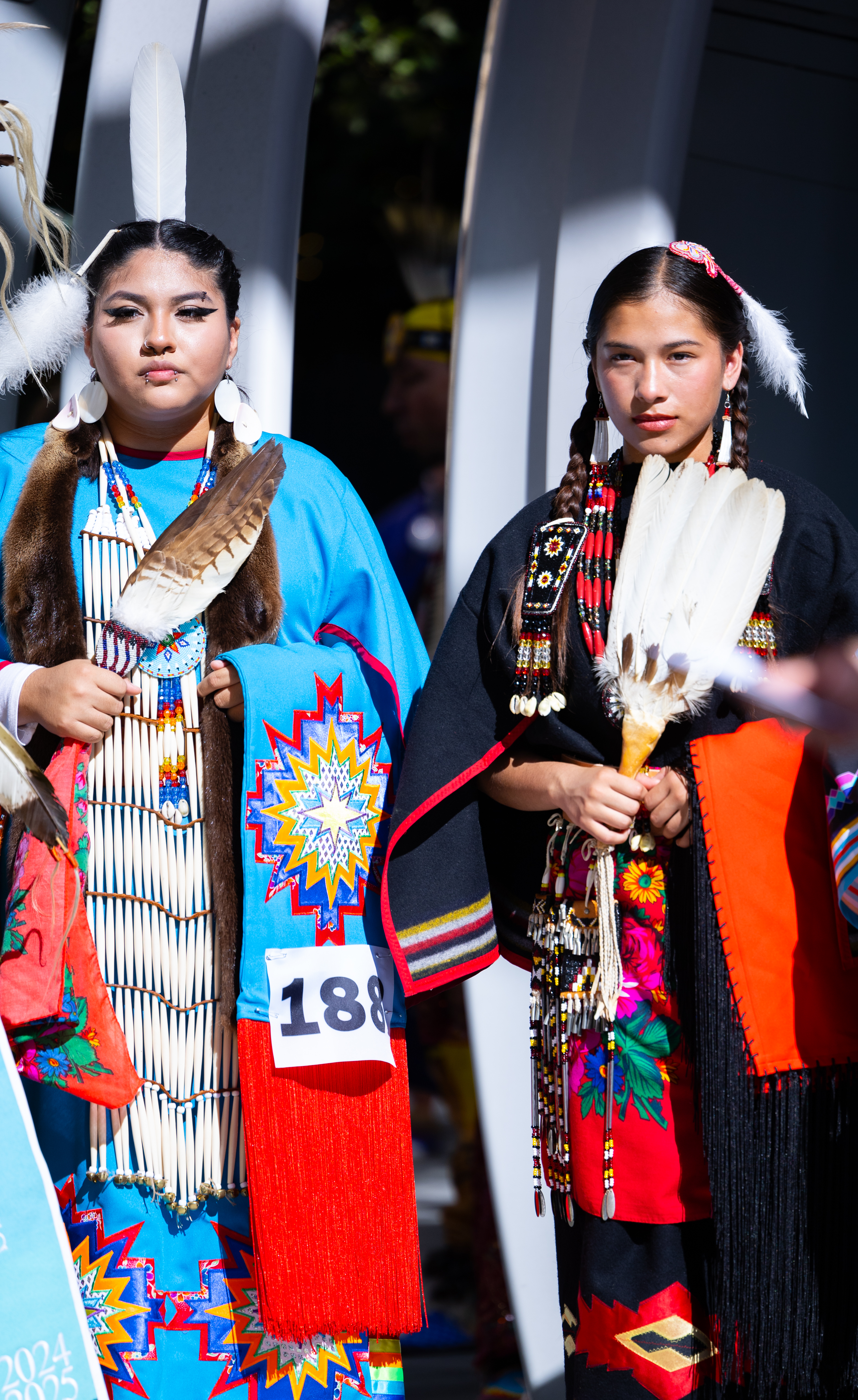
- Native American Heritage Month event in Dallas (2024)
- Also called: Native American Heritage Month
- Observed by: United States
- Date: November
- Frequency: Annual
- First time: November 1990

On August 3, 1990, President of the United States George H. W. Bush declared the month of November as National American Indian Heritage Month. The bill read in part that "The President has authorized and requested to call upon Federal, State and local Governments, groups and organizations and the people of the United States to observe such month with appropriate programs, ceremonies and activities". This landmark bill honoring America's Native people represented a major step in the establishment of this celebration which began in 1976 when a Cherokee/Osage Indian named Jerry C. Elliott-High Eagle authored Native American Awareness Week legislation the first historical week of recognition in the nation for native peoples. This led to 1986 with then President Ronald Reagan proclaiming November 23–30, 1986, as "American Indian Week".

This commemorative month aims to provide a platform for Native people in the United States of America to share their culture, traditions, music, crafts, dance, and ways and concepts of life. This gives Native people the opportunity to express to their community, both city, county and state officials their concerns and solutions for building bridges of understanding and friendship in their local area. Federal Agencies are encouraged to provide educational programs for their employees regarding Native American history, rights, culture and contemporary issues, to better assist them in their jobs and for overall awareness.

== History of public observances for American Indians ==
=== Current designation ===
- 101st United States Congress – Pub. L. 101–343, 104 Stat. 391 November 1990 National American Indian Heritage Month

=== Previous designations ===
- 101st Congress – Pub. L. 101–188, 103 Stat. 1351 December 3–9, 1989 (American Indian Week)
- 100th United States Congress – Pub. L. 100–450, 102 Stat. 1899, September 23–30, 1988 (American Indian Week)
- 100th Congress – Pub. L. 100–171, 101 Stat. 915, November 22–28, 1987 (American Indian Week)
- 99th United States Congress – Pub. L. 99–471, 100 Stat. 1199, November 23–30, 1986 (American Indian Week)
- 97th United States Congress – Pub. L. 97–445, 96 Stat. 2328, May 13, 1983 (American Indian Day)

=== Proclamations ===
In 1976, a Cherokee Indian named J.C. Elliott-High Eagle authored the historic first week of awareness and recognition for native American Indian and Alaska natives. The week of ceremonies and activities were held in October. In 2012, 2013, 2014, 2015, and 2016 President Barack Obama made a Presidential proclamation on the 31st of October of each year that each respective November would be National Native American Heritage Month.

In 2017, 2018, and 2019 President Donald Trump made a Presidential proclamation on the 31st of October of each year that each respective November would be National Native American Heritage Month.

=== Legislation ===
A Cherokee American Indian, J.C. Elliott-High Eagle, authored Pub. L. 94–103, 89 Stat. 486 (S.J. Res. 209) for American Indian Awareness Week, October 10–16, 1976, signed by President Gerald R. Ford. This became the first official week of national recognition for the American Indian (Proclamation 4468) since the founding of the nation.

== National American History and Founders Month ==
On October 31, 2019, President Donald Trump declared November as National American History and Founders Month to celebrate the first European founders and settlers of America.

== See also ==
- Indigenous Peoples' Day
- Native American Day
- Native American Heritage Day
