= Juanita L. Learned =

American politician (1930-1996)

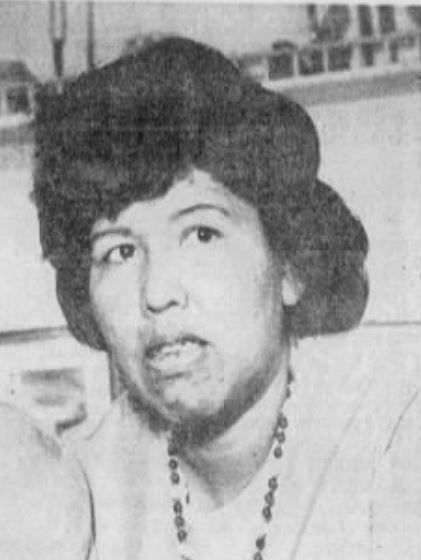
- Learned in 1970
- Born: Juanita Howling Buffalo; September 6, 1930; Canton, Blaine County, Oklahoma
- Died: August 26, 1996 (aged 65); Oklahoma City, Oklahoma
- Other name: Juanita Lincoln Learned
- Occupation: Cheyenne-Arapaho chair
- Years active: 1965–1993
- Children: 10

Juanita L. Learned (September 6, 1930 – August 26, 1996) was tribal chair of the Cheyenne and Arapaho Tribes from 1982 to 1984 and 1988 to 1992. She was Southern Arapaho and was known for her work to keep the Concho Indian School from closing, as well as actions to return the school building, and land and buildings of Fort Reno to her tribe. She was the first woman to chair the Cheyenne and Arapaho Tribes.

== Early life and education ==
Juanita Howling Buffalo (also Juanita Lincoln and Juanita Chiefly) was born on September 6, 1930, in Carlton Township, near Canton, Blaine County, Oklahoma, to Rose Howling Buffalo. Her family were members of the Cheyenne and Arapaho Tribes in Oklahoma and were Southern Arapaho. She was raised on the farm of her grandparents, Howling Buffalo, also known as Howard Lincoln, and Crazy Wolf (née Myrtle Badman), also known as Myrtle Howling Buffalo or Myrtle Lincoln. She attended the Concho Indian School and then furthered her education at the Haskell Institute. After finishing her schooling, Howling Buffalo served in the Women's Army Corps. During her service, while stationed in South Carolina, she met John W. Learned, who was serving in the United States Marine Corps. The couple would marry in 1953 and after their military service returned to Oklahoma, later having 10 children.

== Career ==
In 1965, Learned was a write in candidate for the 1966–1967 term on the Cheynne-Arapaho Business Committee. Because votes for her were not counted in the results, she obtained an injunction from the federal district court to stop the elected delegates from Canton from sitting on the council. When the case was tried, the ruling favored Learned, and a new election was held in 1966, where she as well as two other women won council seats. She did not serve the following term, but was re-elected in 1970. She served as tribal treasurer that year and Native Americans at the 50th Anniversary meeting of the US Department of Labor's Women's Division in Washington.

With LaDonna Harris, Learned founded Oklahomans for Indian Opportunity, an organization aimed at addressing tribal poverty across the state. She was appointed director of the organization in 1971. She returned to tribal politics and was re-elected to the business committee in 1977. Learned served that year and then again from 1982 to 1992 without a break in service. She became the first woman to serve as tribal chair in 1982, and served a two-year-term. During her term, she led protests against the closure of the Concho Indian School and obtained an injunction from the United States District Court for the District of Columbia to stop the closure. Despite their efforts, the school was closed in 1983, though the school buildings were returned to the tribe in 1985.

Learned became tribal chair again in 1988, serving through 1990 and in that year was elected to serve as the chair of the Oklahoma Indian Gaming Commission, as well as being re-elected tribal chair. In 1990, she went to Washington, D.C., along with other tribal leaders, in an attempt to reclaim the land and facilities of Fort Reno, which had been vacated by the military in 1948 and transferred to the Department of Agriculture. Learned was appointed to serve with representatives from other tribes on an advisory board to reorganize the Bureau of Indian Affairs in 1991. The following year, she was named to serve on the board of the Oklahoma Institute of Indian Heritage, an organization formed to assist in the development of Native American tourism in the state.

In 1995, Learned, along with Senator Mike Combs, who had served as tribal business manager; Viola Hatch, former tribal treasurer; and Mike Shadaram, previously the tribe's financial director, were "convicted of converting tribal money to their personal use by filing falsified claims for payments". Learned was ordered to pay $400 in restitution and was placed on a two-year probation, while the other committee members were given 12- to 15-month prison terms. She appealed her conviction, which was posthumously dismissed in 1996 by the United States Court of Appeals for the Tenth Circuit, which also reversed the convictions against Combs and Hatch.

== Death and legacy ==
Learned died on August 26, 1996, in Oklahoma City, Oklahoma. Two of her sons, Brent and Matt, became artists and her son John became a founder and the executive director of the Great Plains Indian Center in Kansas City, Missouri.

== See also ==
- List of Native American politicians
- Native American women in politics
