= William A. Martin =

American computer scientist

William Arthur Martin
- Born: 1938; Oklahoma City, Oklahoma
- Died: 1981; Brookline, Massachusetts
- Education: MIT
- Scientific career
- Fields: Electrical engineering
- Workplaces: MIT
- Doctoral advisor: Marvin Minsky

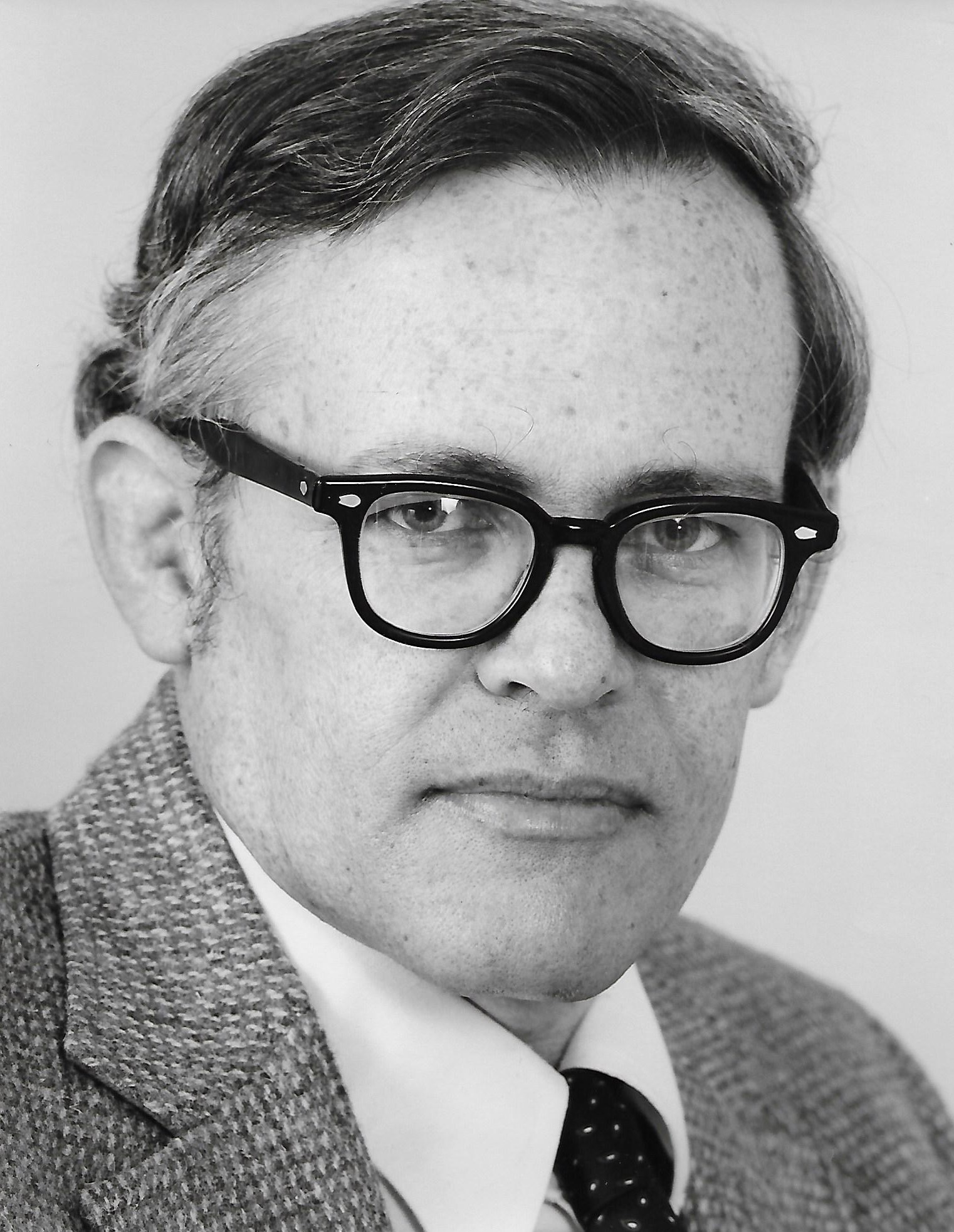

William Arthur Martin (1938-1981) was a computer scientist from Oklahoma City, Oklahoma.

After graduating from Northwest Classen High School, where he was a state wrestling champion, he attended MIT where he received a bachelor's degree (1960), master's (1962) and a Ph.D. (1967) in electrical engineering under supervision of Marvin Minsky, with a dissertation on Symbolic Mathematical Laboratory. Bill was appointed to the M.I.T. faculty in 1968 with a joint appointment at the Sloan School and the Electrical Engineering / Computer Science Department. In 1975, he was promoted to Associate Professor and received tenure. He was about to come up for Full Professor when he became ill in 1980; he was promoted posthumously.

His research pulled him towards the Project MAC, which became the Laboratory for Computer Science and the Artificial Intelligence Laboratory, where he researched expert systems.

Martin co-founded the Macsyma project in 1968 and directed it until 1971. Macsyma later became a successful commercial product and is the core of the free Maxima system.

Martin then worked in automatic programming, knowledge representation and natural language processing.

Like many M.I.T. professors, Bill did consulting work, including, for example, at Bolt, Beranek and Newman and at IBM. He also started a small company with Peter Szolovits and Lowell Hawkinson called Knowledge & Language Technology (KLT), which did work for DARPA.

M.I.T. has compiled a complete record of Bill's time as a student and faculty member, including a listing of publications, courses taught, and theses supervised, which can be found here.

Martin married Susan Young Forbes in 1970 and together they had three sons: James Campbell (Jamie) born in 1974, Christopher Forbes (Tad) born in 1977, and Jonathan Gilbert (Jon) born in 1979. His parents were Barbara Jane Sawhill Martin, a long-time first grade teacher at the Nichols Hills School, and Earl Martin, a teacher and Superintendent of Elementary Education for Oklahoma City. He is survived by his wife, his sons, and his sister, Jane Ann Martin Slane.

== Bibliography ==
- Martin, William A. (1966). Symbolic Mathematical Laboratory (Ph.D. thesis). M.I.T. Project MAC TR-36.
- Penfield, Jr., Paul (August 1, 2000). "William Arthur Martin". MIT EECS Great Educator Awards. Massachusetts Institute of Technology. Archived from the original on June 10, 2011.
