= Lance Henson =

American poet

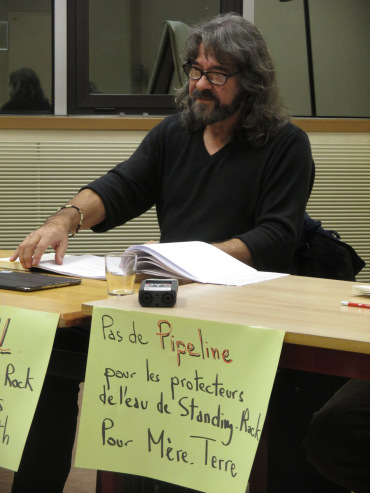
Henson in 2016

Lance Henson (born September 20, 1944) is a Cheyenne poet. Henson was born in Washington, D.C., and grew up near Calumet, Oklahoma, where his grandparents raised him in the traditions of the Cheyenne tribe. He has published 50 volumes of poetry, which have been translated into 25 languages. He has been described as the "foremost Cheyenne poet now writing."

== Early life ==
Henson was born in Washington, D.C., on September 20, 1944. He is of Cheyenne, Oglala, and Cajun ancestry. He grew up near Calumet, Oklahoma, where he was raised by his grandparents who immersed him in the traditions and culture of the Cheyenne tribe. After graduating from high school, he served in the U.S. Marine Corps in the Vietnam War. He later became a member of the Cheyenne Dog Soldier Society, an organization of Cheyenne veterans. He attended Oklahoma College of Liberal Arts (now the University of Science and Arts of Oklahoma), where he earned a Bachelor of Arts degree in English. He earned a Ford Foundation Scholarship, which allowed him to undertake graduate studies at the University of Tulsa, where he earned a Master of Arts degree in Creative Writing.

== Career ==
Henson published his first book of poetry, Keeper of Arrows, in 1971, when he was still a student at Oklahoma College of Liberal Arts. He was part of the State Arts Council of Oklahoma's Artist in Residence Program, through which he conducted poetry workshops throughout the state for 10 years. Since then, he has traveled around the world lecturing and doing readings of his poetry. In his travels throughout the United States and Europe, he has been a poet in residence at more than 800 schools.

At the United Nations Indigenous Peoples Conference in Geneva in 1988, Henson represented the Southern Cheyenne. In 1993, he was part of a United States Information Agency tour, in which he lectured in Singapore, Thailand, New Guinea and New Zealand. Also in 1993, he was poet-in-residence at the University of New Mexico. He was a resident at the Millay Colony for the Arts in 1995, and he was awarded a Distinguished Native American Scholars residency at the Smithsonian Institution. In 2004, Henson was inducted into the University of Science and Arts of Oklahoma Hall of Fame.

He has published 50 volumes of poetry, which have been translated in 25 languages.

Henson lives in Italy, where his works have been popular. Many of his books are published in Italian/English editions. He returns to Oklahoma every June to take part in the Cheyenne Sun Dance.

In 2013, Henson established an official website where selected recent works are available in advance of publication.

== Plays ==
He has written two plays, "Winter Man," which was performed in New York of Broadway at La MaMa Experimental Theatre Club, and "Coyote Road," which has been performed at Mad River Theater in West Liberty, Ohio, and in Versailles, France.

== Style and influences ==
Henson's poems draw upon his Cheyenne heritage, incorporating words from the Cheyenne language, Cheyenne philosophy, and Hanson's own social and political commentary. He writes in a minimalist style with no capitalization, punctuation, rhyme, or meter. Wilson notes that this style is similar to traditional Cheyenne songs. Imagery of nature and the seasons figures prominently in Henson's works. He also comments on the status of indigenous peoples, their historic oppression, and modern threats to their cultures. His work is influenced Walt Whitman, N. Scott Momaday, Carl Jung, Herman Melville, Nathaniel Hawthorne, and Mark Twain. Robert Berner also notes references to haiku, Li Po, and Tu Fu in his works.

== Sources ==
- Velie, Alan R., ed. "Lance Henson," American Indian Literature: An Anthology. Rev. ed. University of Oklahoma Press: Norman, OK, 1991. ISBN 0-8061-2331-1
