= Concho, Oklahoma =

Unincorporated community in Oklahoma, US

Concho, Oklahoma Kooheiyei'it (Arapaho) Méave'ho'éno (Cheyenne)
- Unincorporated community
- Location within the state of Oklahoma Concho (the United States)
- Coordinates: 35°36′56″N 97°59′40″W
- Country: United States
- State: Oklahoma
- County: Canadian
- Elevation: 1,391 ft (424 m)
- Time zone: UTC-6 (Central (CST))
  - Summer (DST): UTC-5 (CDT)
- ZIP codes: 73022
- GNIS feature ID: 1091603

Concho (Arapaho: Kooheiyei'it, Cheyenne: Méave'ho'éno) is an unincorporated area near El Reno in Canadian County, Oklahoma, United States. It is north of the Concho Indian Boarding School. The post office opened April 20, 1915. The ZIP code is 73022. The school and post office were named for Indian agent, Charles E. Shell. It is the headquarters of the Cheyenne and Arapaho Tribes.

The 2026 made-in-Oklahoma film Gangland, starring Lou Diamond Phillips, was partially shot in Concho.
