= Clyde Warrior =

Native American activist and leader

Clyde Merton Warrior
- Born: 31 August 1939; Ponca City, Oklahoma
- Died: 19 July 1968 (aged 28); Enid, Oklahoma
- Occupation: Native American Activist
- Years active: 1961-1968
- Known for: fancy dancing and activism

Clyde Merton Warrior (1939–1968) was a Native American activist and leader, orator and one of the founders of the National Indian Youth Council. He participated in the March on Washington and the war on poverty in the 1960s and was a charismatic speaker on Indian self-determination.

== Biography ==
Clyde Merton Warrior was born 31 August 1939 near Ponca City, Oklahoma, to Gloria Collins and was raised by his grandparents in the Ponca traditions. He was a member of the Ponca Tribe of Indians of Oklahoma. He spoke the Ponca language, learned a wide range of tribal songs and was a champion fancy dancer in his teens. Newspapers classed him as a world champion dancer by 1957 and in 1958, he won an award in a state-level high school art competition.

Warrior attended Cameron Junior College in Lawton, Oklahoma. He earned the Outstanding Indian Student Award in 1962, and he was elected President of the Southwest Regional Indian Youth Council. Later, he earned a Bachelor's degree from Northeastern State University in 1966.

== Marriage and family ==
In 1962, Warrior married Della Hopper (Otoe-Missouria). The couple had two daughters.

== Activism ==
In the spring of 1961, Warrior attended a regional planning meeting at the University of Oklahoma in preparation for a conference to be held in June in Chicago. He also participated that spring in the annual meeting of the Southwestern Regional Indian Youth Council and was elected president.

From 13–20 June 1961, at a conference with over 800 participants held in Chicago, Illinois with educators and anthropologists, and frustrated Native Americans a "Declaration of Indian Purpose: the Voice of the American Indian" – a policy created for Indians by Indians was produced. The policy was delivered to President John F. Kennedy, but the youth leaders went on to form the National Indian Youth Council (NIYC) in Gallup, New Mexico later that summer, to translate words into actions. Warrior was a participant at both the Chicago conference and the subsequent meeting in Gallup. The founding members of NIYC – Herbert Blatchford, Navajo Nation; Gerald Brown, Flathead Indian Reservation of Montana; Sam English, Ojibwe; Viola Hatch, Arapaho of the Cheyenne-Arapaho Tribe of Oklahoma; Joan Nobel, Ute; Karen Rickard, Tuscarora; Melvin Thom Walker River Paiute Tribe of the Walker River Reservation, Nevada; Clyde Warrior, Ponca Tribe of Indians of Oklahoma; Della Warrior, Otoe-Missouria Tribe of Indians of Oklahoma; and Shirley Hill Witt, Mohawk – included 3 members from Oklahoma. Although NIYC claimed to have hundreds of members, a core group of ten to fifteen people shaped the organization. By 1967, Warrior was president of the organization.

After the meeting, Warrior was nominated to the Ponca tribal council and was a popular speaker on college campuses. He became the co-editor of Indian Voices, a periodical created at the University of Chicago for the Commission on Human Relations. Warrior worked to help Washington State tribes secure their fishing rights, utilizing publicists from New York City and Marlon Brando to create visibility, using guidance from his studies of Martin Luther King Jr.'s human and civil rights strategies at the August 1963 March on Washington for Jobs and Freedom.

Warrior witnessed discrimination against Indian people, crushing poverty in Native communities, and incompetence in the Bureau of Indian Affairs. He fought injustice and worked to promote Native pride. He wrote two highly influential essays in the mid-1960s, "Which One Are You?: Five Types of Young Indians" and "We Are Not Free" and was invited to speak in Washington, DC on how the War on Poverty could help Native people.

Warrior promoted self-determination and inspired many young Native activists during the 1960s and 1970s.

== Death ==
Warrior died at the age of 28 on July 19, 1968, due to liver failure after years of excessive alcohol use. He is buried in Ponca City. His epitaph says, "A Fresh Air of New Indian Idealism."

== Quote ==
"We are not free. We do not make choices. Our choices are made for us."

"The sewage of Europe does not run through these veins."
