= Wolf Robe =

Cheyenne leader

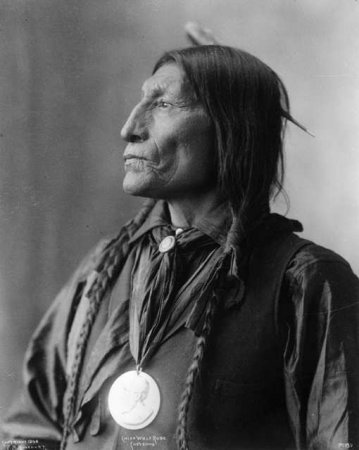
Wolf Robe, photographed by Frank Rinehart

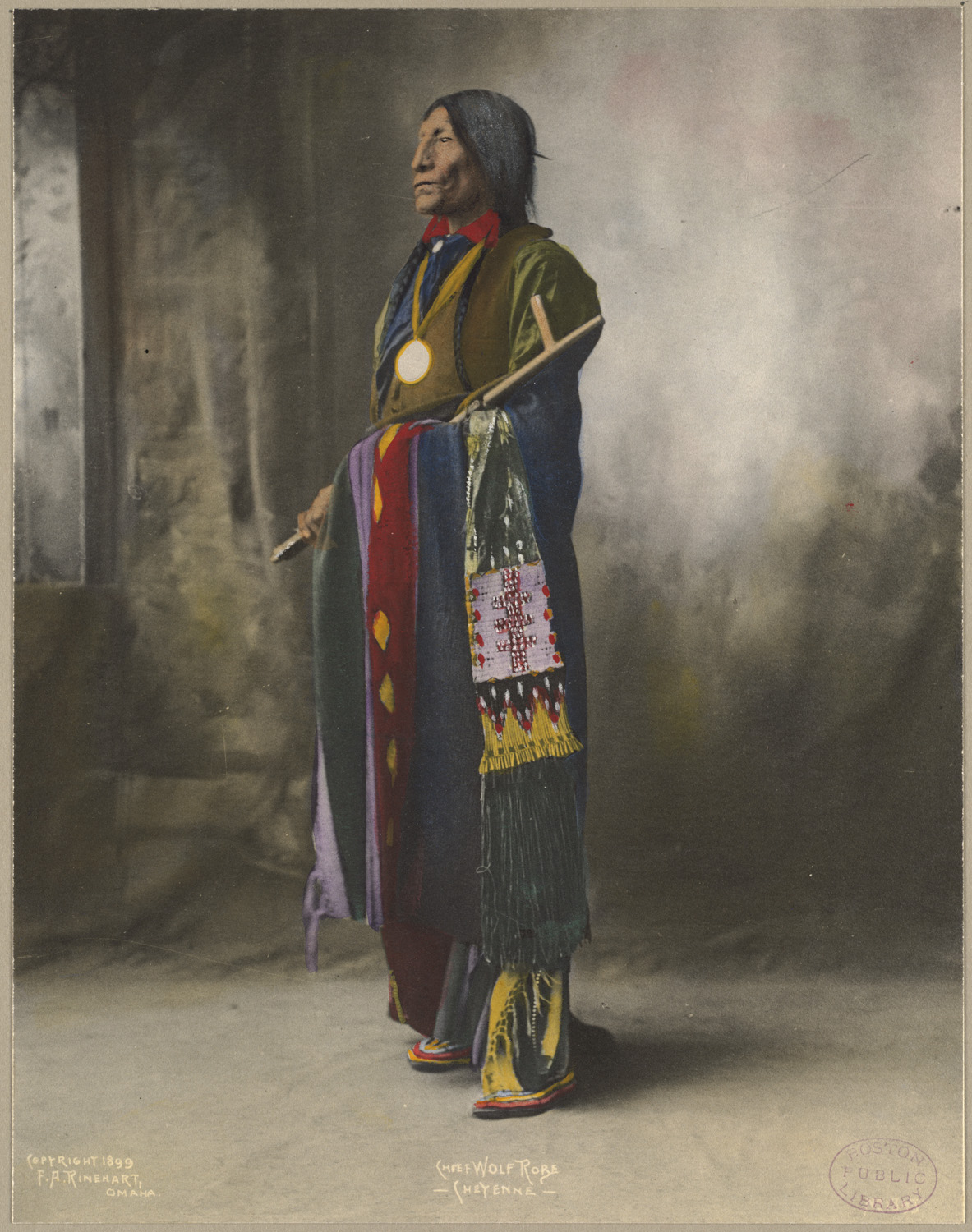
Wolf Robe, photographed by Frank Rinehart

Wolf Robe or Ho'néhevotoomáhe (born between 1838 and 1841; died 1910, Oklahoma) was a Southern Cheyenne chief and a holder of the Benjamin Harrison Peace Medal.

During the late 1870s he was forced to leave the open plains and relocate his tribe on to the Cheyenne and Arapaho Indian Reservation in Indian Territory. He was awarded the Benjamin Harrison Peace Medal in 1890 for his assistance in the Cherokee Commission.

F. A. Rinehart photographed the chief in 1898, and DeLancy Gill photographed him in 1909. The iconic portrait photographs of Wolf Robe have been popular throughout the last century. Numerous painters and sculptors have, in turn, created artworks based upon these photographs. Although it is unlikely, some people believe he was the model for the Indian Head nickel.
