= Jerry C. Elliott =

NASA physicist

Jerry Elliott
- Born: Jerry Chris Elliott; 1943 (age 82–83); Oklahoma City, Oklahoma, United States
- Citizenship: Osage-Cherokee
- Education: University of Oklahoma, Physics

Jerry Chris Elliott High Eagle (born 1943) is a physicist and was one of the first American Indians to work at NASA. Elliott's work awarded him the Presidential Medal of Freedom, the highest civilian honor awarded by the President of the United States.

== Early life ==
High Eagle, from the age of five, had a vision of assisting astronauts to get to the moon. While supported by some members in his family and community, he was faced with opposition due to his race.

After graduating from Northwest Classen High School, he was accepted into the University of Oklahoma at the age of 18. While in university, he faced a degree of culture shock, facing disrespect and misunderstandings towards him as an American Indian. He faced racial discrimination from his professors, and was unable to pursue graduate studies due to the death of his stepfather and an overall lack of funding. He received a degree in physics with a minor in mathematics in April 1966, being the first indigenous native to obtain one from the University of Oklahoma, department of physics.

== Career at NASA ==
Starting his space career early in the Gemini Program, Elliott joined NASA in April 1966 as a flight mission operations engineer, serving at the Mission Control Center in Houston, Texas. He was Program Staff Engineer at the NASA Headquarters in Washington, DC during the Apollo–Soyuz Program. He served as a Senior Technical Manager in the Management Integration Office of the Space Station's Program Office. Elliott and his team provided ground support equipment and space hardware for Skylab, the United States' first space station.

While at NASA, Elliott pushed for furthering telecommunications infrastructure between reservations. Implemented the American Indian Telecommunications Satellite Demonstration Project linked the All-Indian Pueblo Council and the Crow Indian Reservation with the federal government at Washington, D.C. His testimony before Congress culminated in the establishment in the First Americans Commission for Telecommunications (FACT).

During the Apollo program he held several important management and leadership positions. He was the only indigenous native person on the control team. He served on the mission control team during Apollo 11's successful Moon landing. Elliott played an instrumental role in computing the trajectory and successful recovery back to Earth during the events of Apollo 13. His efforts during the events of the disaster awarded him the Presidential Medal of Freedom by Richard Nixon for his role in saving the lives of the three endangered astronauts.

Accomplishing his boyhood vision of landing men on the Moon, Elliott continued work at NASA for a total of four decades. Some of Elliott's personal papers during the Apollo era are held at the Oklahoma History Center.

== Personal life ==
Elliott is fluent in the English, and proficient in Russian, Spanish, and Osage languages. His name "High Eagle" was given to him when he turned 41, by native elders. Elliott cites his mother and Albert Einstein as his personal heroes. He enjoys playing the guitar and Indian flute. His work in music has led to him performing in the National Symphony Orchestra in Washington, D.C. He has also played roles on the film Houston, We've Got a Problem, where he played himself, along with an appearance on the television show Walker, Texas Ranger.

In 1977, he was a founder/incorporator of the American Indian Science and Engineering Society, Inc., along with two other founders, George Thomas (Cherokee), and Alex Labadie (Osage). The society pursues further Native American involvement in the sciences. He is the founder and CEO of High Eagle Technologies, Inc, a native company dedicated to cancer research and treatment with patented technology he was awarded in 2019.

Mr. Elliott authored the Congressional legislation for Native American Awareness Week, 1976, for the first historic week of observance for the American Indian in the history of the United States. The legislation was passed by the U.S. Congress and signed into law by President Gerald R. Ford.

== Awards and recognition ==
- Cherokee Medal of Honor
- Navajo Medal of Honor
- Presidential Medal of Freedom
- Medal of Honor Award, highest national honor bestowed by The National Society of the Daughters of the American Revolution, for high ethical conduct and contributions to humanity, 1991.
- State of Tennessee Special Proclamation by Governor and Tennessee Legislature honoring meritorious achievements in science, music and contributions to humanity, February 7, 2007.
- Ely Samuel Parker Award, highest honor bestowed by the American Indian Science & Engineering Society (AISES), Inc., for lifetime career achievements and community service.
- Bausch and Lomb National Science Award.
- Science and Engineering National Achievement Award, presented by the American Indian Art and Cultural Exchange, 1976.
- National Chairperson, Native American Awareness Week, October 10–16, 1976. He authored congressional legislation signed by President Gerald R. Ford.
- Bronze Halo Award by the Southern California Motion Picture Council for outstanding contributions to humanity, 1983.
- Special Achievement Award by the National Aeronautics and Space Administration Lewis Research Center (now Glenn Research Center), Cleveland, Ohio, for meritorious achievements, and exceptional contributions to research, planning, organization and conduct of responsibilities relating to space and technology programs. 1978.
- Group Achievement Award by NASA Langley Research Center, 1981.
- National Science Spectrum Trailblazer Award, 2006, for significant, quantifiable, personal impact on industry and their communities in maintaining a powerful position of influence regarding public policy.
- Sequoyah Fellow Honor, American Indian Science & Engineering Society, 2003
- Teacher Award, presented by the American Indian Science & Engineering Society, Inc., 2004
- Science Spectrum Trailblazers Award, presented by Science Spectrum Magazine, 2006
- Oklahoma 2011 Indian Elder Distinguished Honoree, bestowed by the American Assoc. of Retired, for outstanding achievements/contributions to his tribe, community and state, 2011
- Poet Laurette, Nominated for distinction of State of Oklahoma, Poet Laurette, 2017
- NWC Hall of Fame, inducted November 1, 2019, Oklahoma City, Oklahoma 2019
- Nominated for the Technical Excellence Award, American Indian Science & Engineering Society, Inc., 2020.
