= J. Clifford Hudson =

American business executive (born 1954)

Clifford Hudson
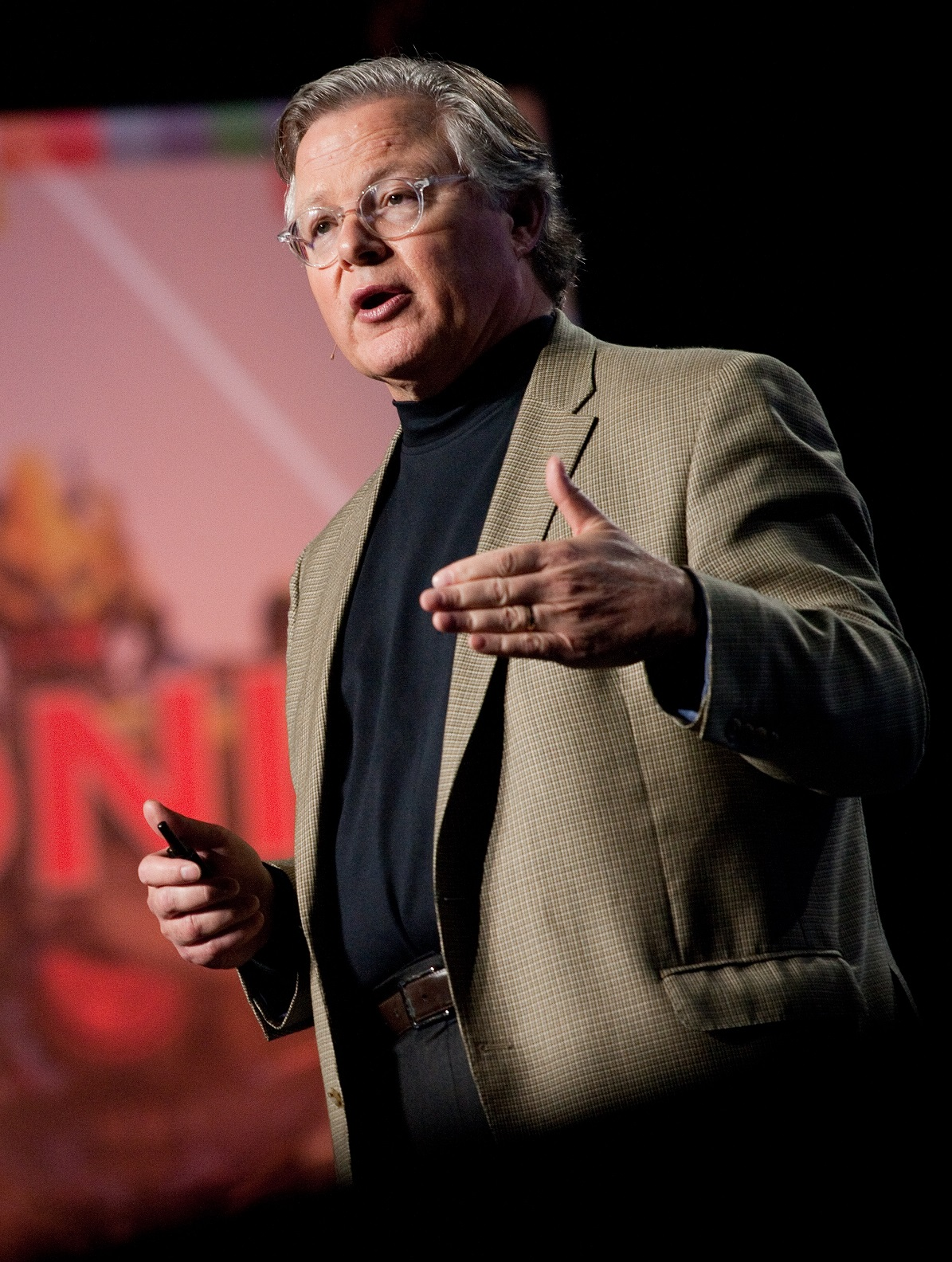
- Born: 1954 (age 71–72); Dallas, Texas, U.S.
- Education: University of Oklahoma (BA); Georgetown University (JD)
- Occupations: Former Chairman, President and CEO of Sonic Corp.
- Spouse: Leslie Hudson

J. Clifford Hudson (born 1954, Dallas) is an American business executive best known for serving as chairman of the board and chief executive officer of Oklahoma City-based Sonic Corp. He also served as a trustee of the Ford Foundation and is a past chairman of the board of the National Trust for Historic Preservation. From 1994-2001, he served as Board Chair of the Securities Investor Protection Corporation, to which he was appointed by President Bill Clinton. Today, he is a founder and managing director of DIA Equity Partners.

== Personal life ==
Hudson is a graduate of the University of Oklahoma and Georgetown University Law Center. He is married to Leslie Hudson, a public health professional and former associate professor at the University of Oklahoma, with whom he has two sons. In his spare time, he has been a member of the Sonic Tones, an eight-member band made up of senior executives of the Sonic Corporation, which competed in the 2003 Battle of the Corporate Bands at the Rock and Roll Hall of Fame and Museum in Cleveland, Ohio.

== Career ==
After several years as a practicing attorney, Hudson was hired as the head of the legal department for Sonic Corp in 1984. He became president and chief executive officer in 1995, and was named chairman in January 2000. During his tenure, the company grew from a nationwide total of 1,428 locations in 1995 to more than 3,500 today, with locations in 45 of the 50 US states. In addition, average drive-in sales have increased by 65% and system-wide sales from $880 million to $4.5 billion. The company's enterprise value grew from approximately $200 million to more than $2.3 billion, when it was acquired by Inspire Brands in 2018.

Hudson is now the Founder and Managing Director of DIA Equity Partners, a private equity firm formed mostly with Sonic related officers and directors.

== Philanthropy ==
Hudson was a member of the board of trustees of the Ford Foundation from 2005 to 2017 and is a past chairman of the National Trust for Historic Preservation. He is past chairman of Georgetown University Law Center's Board of Visitors and has served as chairman of the Oklahoma City Public School Board of Education. In 1994, he was appointed by President Bill Clinton to serve as chairman of the Board of the Securities Investor Protection Corporation, and served until 2001. In addition to this he has served on numerous boards related to Oklahoma City including MAPS for Kids—a $700 million school revitalization program. In 2015, Leslie and Clifford Hudson endowed the Hudson Fellows scholarship fund for select Ph.D. students at the University of Oklahoma College of Public Health. By 2018, the Hudsons increased their scholarship gifts to $5 million and the OU Board of Regents named the (now) Hudson College of Public Health in their honor.

Since 2018, Hudson has served on the Board of Trustees of Union Theological Seminary of New York City, where he now serves as chair of the board.

== Awards and honors ==
Hudson received the 2004 Silver Plate - Foodservice Operator of the Year Award from International Foodservice Manufacturers Association, and the 2000 Multi-Unit Foodservice Operators (MUFSO) Golden Chain Award from Nation's Restaurant News. He has been a guest on various national business programs including CNBC's Mad Money, Squawkbox and Power Lunch, as well as various Bloomberg news programs. In 2009, he was placed on the Foundation for Oklahoma City Public Schools Hall of Fame for his longstanding service. In 2001 Hudson received the University's Regent's Alumni Award from the University of Oklahoma and, in 2011, the University of Oklahoma conferred to him an honorary doctorate degree in humane letters as a “civic leader and supporter of education”. The Georgetown University Alumni Association has also awarded him its highest honor, the John Carroll Award, in 2014.
