= Herbert Blatchford =

Native American activist from Arizona and New Mexico (1928–1996)

- Born: March 16, 1928; Fort Defiance, Arizona
- Died: December 1, 1996 (aged 68); Gallup, New Mexico
- Citizenship: Navajo Nation and US
- Occupation: Native American rights activist
- Known for: cofounding the National Indian Youth Council

Herbert Blatchford (1928–1996) was a Diné Native American activist and leader, and one of the founders of the National Indian Youth Council (NIYC). He played a significant role in the establishment of the organization and served as its first executive director. He participated with other co-founders of the NIYC in the Fish Wars in the Pacific Northwest of the United States.

== Biography ==
Herbert Blatchford was born on March 16, 1928 in Fort Defiance, Arizona, and raised in the Navajo Nation. He descended from a family of sheepherders and traced his lineage back to the great nineteenth-century Navajo leader Manuelito. Once he reached school age he attended a Methodist mission school on the reservation and excelled academically. After graduating, Blatchford served in the United States Army Air Forces during World War II before enrolling at the University of New Mexico in the early 1950s. At the University of New Mexico he helped found the Kiva Club, the university's American Indian student organization, and served as its president in 1954.

Prior to becoming the first executive director of the National Indian Youth Council (NIYC), Blatchford worked for the New Mexico State Department of Education. After severing ties with the NIYC in 1965 he served as president of the Northwest New Mexico Economic Opportunity Council. He also took over as director of the Gallup Indian Community Center, which helped relocated Navajo and Hopi adjust to their new surroundings in the city. He served as director of the Gallup community center until 1972, when he was fired by Gallup, New Mexico's mayor Frankie Garcia, allegedly for Blatchford's active efforts to curb alcoholism among Native American relocatees.

== Activism ==
=== Early activism ===
After returning from the Second World War, Blatchford went on to champion American Indian voting rights in Arizona and New Mexico. Blatchford participated in the National Congress of American Indians' (NCAI) Workshop on American Indian Affairs for Native Students. He also repeatedly participated in meetings of the Regional Indian Youth Council (RIYC). Blatchford through his meetings at the RIYC saw "a need for freer movement." For the Youth Conferences to pursue "whatever sparks enthusiasm and interest; rather than more formal agenda." Later he also attended the American Indian Chicago Conference (AICC), forming a caucus with other American Indian youths and establishing connections that would later be used to found the National Indian Youth Council. The AICC inspired Blatchford and other young activists to break off from the Regional Indian Youth Council and its white sponsorship to create a new American Indian national organization that backed the principles of treaty rights, tribal sovereignty, and cultural preservation.

=== Founding the National Indian Youth Council ===
Blatchford, alongside other student American Indian activists including Clyde Warrior, Melvin Thom, Joan Noble, Shirley Hill Witt, Karen Rickard, and others, cofounded the National Indian Youth Council. An organization intended to protect and further Native American rights. Blatchford played a major role in establishing the organization. He gathered the names and addresses of those who had participated in the youth caucus at the AICC, with his list of 24 young conference attendees from across the United States. He also wrote to Mel Thom and other co-founders of the future NIYC about calling a national American Indian youth meeting, positing that such a meeting might lead to a new national organization. He also worked out the details of his vision for the potential organization. Proposing the idea of organizing a nonprofit corporation at their national meeting and drafting articles of incorporation. He suggested that the meeting take place in his hometown of Gallup between August 10 and 13, 1961. As American Indian students would have time before the fall school semester commenced, and the dates coincided with Gallup's Annual Inter-Tribal Indian Ceremony, which would attract greater attention to their meeting. Blatchford also Mimeographed letters he received and exchanged with other activists and mailed them out to everyone on his contact list to create a group discussion and capture the diversity of opinion.

As the meeting in Gallup drew near, Blatchford made arrangements with the local Bureau of Indian Affairs office in Gallup to secure one of the agency's school dormitories for the attendees. With the Gallup Indian Community Center lending meeting space to Blatchford, the city's Chamber of Commerce also donated miscellaneous convention materials. Blatchford and Mel Thom shuttled attendees about Gallup. Blatchford also devised an agenda for the gathering and asked that charter members develop answers to questions regarding the organization's membership, purpose, duties, home base, and sponsorship. About ten of the members from the original youth caucus divided evenly between men and women made their way to the meeting in Gallup.

At the time calling themselves the Chicago Conference Youth Council, the ten students held their first meeting in Gallup on August 10. Blatchford presided over the gathering, reiterating the main points of the agenda. Over the course of their meetings, members of the nascent NIYC resolved issues of where their place was in Indian country's organizational matrix, membership criteria, a tier-system for membership, a name for the organization, financing, and the nomination of officers. Blatchford, who had proposed the chosen name for the National Indian Youth Council, was nominated as the organization's executive director.

Blatchford alone remained in Gallup after the initial meeting. He opened an account at the First State bank there and deposited sixteen dollars before going to the McKinley County commissioners' office to file the NIYC's articles of incorporation. There, Blatchford was informed that the organization had to post an advance public notice in a local newspaper, announcing the dates and whereabouts of their meeting, which charter members had failed to do. Meaning Blatchford had to hold off until after the organization's 1962 meeting to incorporate.

=== As Executive Director of the National Indian Youth Council ===
Shirley Hill Witt and Blatchford were responsible for writing, editing, printing, and distribution of the NIYC's newsletter, called the Aborigine, with Blatchford serving as the newsletter's editor. The first issue of Aborigine had little in the way of opinion pieces or essays, and so reprinted the proceedings from the inaugural meeting in Gallup as well as listing the organization's officers, bylaws, and articles of incorporation. Due to limited finances, the two printed just one hundred copies of the first edition, asking each charter member to foot a portion of the bill and pay distribution costs. Aborigine resonated with many of its readers, bringing in two hundred contributions and new memberships. Blatchford took stacks of the Aborigine to college Indian clubs throughout the Southwest hoping to spread news of the NIYC and attract potential recruits.

In December of 1963 the NIYC's Melvin Thom and Herbert Blatchford were contacted by a handful of tribes in the Pacific Northwest about ongoing fishing disputes in the region. The Fish Wars, a massive protest for fishing rights, led by a diverse intertribal coalition of Indigenous peoples, took place on January 1, 1964, on the Nisqually Reservation. After learning about the protest, NIYC leaders decided to launch their first direct action campaign. Blatchford continued to serve in his role as executive director of the NIYC throughout the Fish Wars in the Pacific Northwest. He took part in a meeting with then Governor Albert Rosellini alongside other members of the NIYC including Clyde Warrior, Hank Adams, Melvin Thom, John Winchester, and Bruce Wilkie in the capitol to talk about American Indian fishing and federal treaty rights.

=== Leaving the National Indian Youth Council ===
The internal organization of the NIYC shifted with time, suffering an internal shake-up partly due to an inability to recreate the success of the fish-ins and its struggle to find a new direction. With the election of new officers, internal changes saw some of the NIYC's founding members part ways with the organization in 1965. Shirley Hill Witt left her position as the organization's Vice President, being succeeded by Ed Johnson and then Angela Russell. Warrior and Wilkie resigned their positions on the board of directors. Blatchford faced pressure from within the NIYC to resign. With council members blaming him for financial and organizational problems plaguing the NIYC, he faced criticism for not being able to keep the council's finances in order. Blatchford believed that the problem resided with the confusion and disagreement over the future of the NIYC. At the council's 1964 meeting in Neah Bay he contended that the council had simply glossed over the budget, giving no input on how monies should be appropriated, and that discord existed due to internal dissent. Blatchford also faced criticism for the American Aborigine, which he resented, with it being criticized as being out of touch with the rising tide of Red Power, especially since he and Witt maintained and edited the newsletter from its inception. After 1965, Blatchford severed his ties with the council.

=== Late activism ===
Blatchford later briefly rejoined the NIYC in 1975 in Albuquerque, New Mexico where he became heavily involved in the council's efforts to block coal gasification on the Navajo Reservation. He also attempted to remold the council he had once directed into an environmentally focused organization, which met resistance from then executive director Gerald Wilkinson, leading to Blatchford again splitting from the NIYC, this time unsuccessfully attempting to form a separate environmentalist outfit. The short-lived American Indian Environmental Council under Blatchford and Winona LaDuke attempted to oppose uranium mining in Native American lands. They attended the Copenhagen Conference on Uranium Mining and Indigenous Cultures, and later called for a demonstration at Mount Taylor to protest a Gulf Oil uranium mine and mill complex.

== Death ==
Herbert Blatchford died on December 1, 1996, when a fire consumed his home outside of Gallup, New Mexico.
