= Concho Indian Boarding School =

School in Oklahoma, US

Information
- Other names: Cheyenne-Arapaho Boarding School at Concho; Concho Indian School; Concho Demonstration School
- School type: Boarding school
- Established: 1909
- Closed: 1983
- Grades: 1-8

Concho Indian Boarding School (also known as the Cheyenne-Arapaho Boarding School at Concho or Concho Indian School and home to the Concho Demonstration School) was a boarding school for members of the Cheyenne and Arapaho Tribes. It initially served grades 1–6, and later extended classes through grade 8. Admission was later opened to other Native American students.

It operated from 1909 to 1983 in central Oklahoma, approximately one mile south of Concho, Oklahoma, and four miles north of El Reno, Oklahoma. The name of the town and school is the Spanish word for "shell"; it was named for the United States Indian agent, Charles E. Shell, who was assigned to the Cheyenne and Araphaho Reservation.

== Curriculum ==
Concho was among numerous boarding schools authorized by Congress in the early 20th century to educate and assimilate American Indian children into mainstream society. Like other federal boarding schools established in the late 19th and early 20th centuries following the model of the Carlisle Indian Industrial School, it was run on a disciplined, military-style model. Students were awakened at 5 a.m., performed military drills and formations, ate breakfast, and started classes by 6:00 each morning. Academic subjects, including reading, writing, and arithmetic, were studied for half the day. Older students were assigned to chores for the remainder of the day, with boys commonly learning artisan trades and skills, and girls being trained in domestic skills, including cooking and laundry.

Trades and farming were taught to boys and girls were taught domestic labor and nursing. The school operated a large experimental farm, both to produce crops and livestock needed, and to instruct the children in agricultural conservation and planting techniques. Boys milked cows, and girls helped prepare all of the meals for students and staff. They also were taught to sew clothing. Discipline was strict. They were punished for speaking in their native languages rather than in English, and were punished by labor such as breaking large rocks into smaller rocks or sawing wood. Each infraction required payment through one hour of labor.

Initially, the school offered education from first to the 6th grade. Students would have to transfer to other schools, such as Carlisle, Chilocco, or Haskell Institute for secondary education. By around the 1920s, the school curriculum and activities reflected that of contemporary public education. Students could play sports, and take classes in music and art, in addition to a full course of academic subjects.

Native American parents demanded changes to this and related schools, seeking curriculum that reflected their own cultures, language study in their languages, and other changes. Following federal legislation passed in the early 1970s, including the Indian Self-Determination and Education Act of 1975, many tribes took over management of schools on their reservations, including boarding schools. In addition, public school districts were established by states in many areas. By the time the Concho School was closed by the Bureau of Indian Affairs (BIA) in the early 1980s, it offered instruction for grades 1–8. It was predominantly attended by orphans and students who needed relief from difficult home environments.

== History ==
The first school was opened at the Darlington Agency on the Cheyenne-Arapaho Reservation in 1871 by the Hicksite (Liberal) Friends and Orthodox Quakers and was called the Cheyenne-Arapaho Boarding School. In 1872, the facility was built with federal funds, but run by the Quakers. Few Cheyenne children attended the school. In an effort to attract them, the Quakers erected partitions to divide the classroom into separate areas for the Arapaho and Cheyenne students.

In 1879 the facility was renamed as the Arapaho Manual Labor and Boarding School. A new facility was built at Caddo Springs for the Cheyenne students; it was called the Cheyenne Manual Labor and Boarding School. Within five years, the agency schools reported that the student children were raising 211 cattle and hogs and cultivating 130 acres of land.

In 1881, a new school, called the Darlington Mission School, was built and run by General Conference Mennonites. A fire there on 19 February 1882 destroyed the building, and the missionary's infant son and three Indian children died. Federal funds and donations from the Mennonite Mission Board were secured to rebuild the mission school by December 1882. The Mennonites also encountered resistance by the two tribes to joint education. They opened a fourth school in 1882 called Cantonment. By 1884, the US Indian agent reported on attendance: 66 students at the Arapaho boarding school, 22 students at Cantonment, 71 students at the Cheyenne boarding school, and 28 students at Darlington.

After 1891 federal policy shifted and began to require more standardization, with attendance quotas and reduced contracting with religious groups for federally supported schools. This led to a decline in accessible education. By the mid-1890s, only about half of the school-age children on the Cheyenne-Arapaho Reservation were attending school. The government enrolled Indian children in the public school system and offset the costs to the schools as an experiment in 1896–1897, but discontinued this program.

Declining attendance at Darlington resulted in its permanent closure in June 1898, and Cantonment closed in 1901.

In 1908 both the Arapaho and Cheyenne boarding schools were closed, and the government sold these facilities. The Darlington Agency was also closed and was relocated to Concho in 1909.

The new Concho Boarding School opened in 1909. It returned to the farming and self-sufficient model. The school's students worked on the farm as part of their daily routine; the school managers operated the farm through the Great Depression. In 1932 the BIA's Seger Indian Training School, which had incorporated the students of the Red Moon School in 1917, closed. Its students were transferred to Concho.

In 1932 Concho Boarding School had a total of 133 boys and 117 girls. However, the school struggled during the Dust Bowl period. Between 1933 and 1937 there were 362 dust storms in the immediate area, coupled with tornadoes and flash flooding. As part of the Works Progress Administration, President Franklin D. Roosevelt signed an Executive Order in 1933 that authorized the Indian Service to establish a Civilian Conservation Corps camp at Concho. It was assigned to improve the grounds and buildings, implement soil erosion controls, and develop water resources.

The Darlington agency buildings were razed and rebuilt in 1933, and a hospital was constructed in 1941.

From the 1940s through the 1960s, the era of federal Indian Termination Policy, there were regular threats of closing Indian schools. Richard Boynton and George Levi, of the Cheyenne and Arapaho Tribes Business Committee and Robert Goombi of the Kiowa Tribe of Oklahoma sent pleas to Oklahoma Congressmen to fight school closure. The bid to save Concho Indian School was successful. In 1962 some of the buildings were converted into a facility to assist troubled students.

In 1968, a new school complex was built for the boarding school. It featured the Concho Demonstration School, a pioneering teaching program to be operated in conjunction with Southwestern State College. The program was designed to overcome language and cultural barriers and offer Indian students access to college materials and individual instruction.

Through the 1960s and 1970s, more alternatives developed to federal schools, including expansion of public school districts, and some tribes establishing their own tribal schools. Due to federal budget cuts and declining enrollment, the school was closed after the graduation ceremonies held 14 May 1982. Though parents and the tribe protested the closure and obtained an injunction to stop it, at the end of the 1983 school term, the school permanently closed.

== Transfer of buildings to Cheyenne-Arapaho ==
The school buildings were transferred to the tribe by the BIA in 1985, potentially for use as business enterprises.

In 2014 artist Steven Grounds (Navajo-Euchee) started painting larger than life murals on the exterior walls to honor chiefs and leaders of the Cheyenne and Arapaho tribes, including 19th-century Chief Black Kettle and Suzan Shown Harjo, who was awarded a Presidential Medal of Freedom in 2014.

In 2015, the tribe planned to convert some of the buildings for use as a fitness center.

== Concho Demonstration School ==
In 1962, the BIA introduced a new system for returning troubled students into the regular school systems. Earl C Intolubbe (Choctaw), an Education Guidance Specialist for the Bureau of Indian Affairs, set up a model school at Concho. It was planned with small classrooms so that individual children received more attention. Students who had dropped out of other schools were placed in the special program. Some returned within weeks or months to their prior boarding schools or public schools, and some attended Concho for years. After six years of operation, the school had a 60% success rate of returning students to regular classes. Intolubbe retired in 1968 when the BIA suggested that the Demonstration School should be combined with the Boarding School, as he felt that would defeat its special mission.

== Notable alumni ==
- Clinton M. "Blackfeather" Youngbear
- Viola Hatch
- Dick West, artist
