= Della Warrior =

Native American tribal leader (born 1946)

- Born: Della Cheryl Hopper; 1946 (age 79–80); Pawnee, Oklahoma
- Citizenship: Otoe-Missouria Tribe of Indians and U.S.
- Occupations: American Indian education, museum director, tribal chairperson, college president
- Known for: President of the Institute of American Indian Arts (IAIA) and chairperson/chief executive officer for the Otoe-Missouria Tribe

Della Warrior (born 1946) is the first and only woman to date to serve as chairperson and chief executive officer for the Otoe-Missouria Tribe. She later served as the president of the Institute of American Indian Arts, finding a permanent home for the institution as well as helping to raise more than one hundred million dollars for the institution over 12 years. Warrior was inducted into the Oklahoma Women's Hall of Fame in 2007.

Since 2021, she has served as president and CEO of the Multi-Indigenous Collaborative for Action (MICA) Group, a Native-led nonprofit.

== Early life ==
Della Cheryl Hopper was born in 1946 in Pawnee, Oklahoma, and grew up in Red Rock, Oklahoma, with her mother and stepfather. An enrolled citizen of the Otoe–Missouria Tribe of Indians, she is also of Muscogee descent. The family moved around frequently, allowing Warrior to have the opportunity to live in cities such as Shawnee, Tulsa, Oklahoma City, Enid, Ponca City, Dallas, Wichita, and Los Angeles. Warrior began her education at Pawnee Indian School and averaged approximately two schools per year up until about sixth grade. During her high school years, Warrior attended six different schools.

== Education ==
After graduation, Warrior left to attend Northeastern State University in Tahlequah, Oklahoma, with the intention of pursuing a medical degree. The summer before her junior year, Warrior attended a workshop at the University of Colorado. This experience broadened her pride in her native heritage and sparked her interest in that field. Her junior year, she changed her major to sociology and graduated with a bachelor's degree in 1966.

Warrior received her master's degree in education from Harvard University in 1971.

== Career ==
Directly out of college, Warrior became the director of social services for Head Start for six counties in Kansas. Later in 1971, she became the director of Indian education for Albuquerque schools and served until 1987. The district contained 117 schools with approximately 3,300 Indian students from over 100 tribes. She became the first and only (to date) female chairman of the Otoe-Missouria Tribe from 1989–1992. In this position, Warrior dealt with issues of roads/transportation, environmental concerns, health, and public safety. From 1993 to 1998, Warrior served the Institute of American Indian Arts (IAIA) first, as acting director of development, and then as Director of Development. In 1998, Warrior became the president of the Institute of American Indian Arts and served in this role until 2006. She established a permanent campus for the institution after a 38-year period of temporary housing. Warrior increased funding by three hundred percent, helping to raise over one hundred million dollars over a 12-year time period.

In June 2013, Warrior was selected as the director of the Museum of Indian Arts and Culture (MIAC) in Santa Fe, New Mexico, becoming the first woman and the first Native American to serve as the museum's director. She retired in 2021, having created a significant expansion of the Museum's education department and its remote programs, and having overseen more than 30 exhibitions, including the revision of the Museum's core exhibit, Here, Now and Always which opened in 2022.

Following retirement from MIAC, Warrior became president and CEO of the Multi-Indigenous Collaborative for Action (MICA Group), an organization she co-founded with Wilma Mankiller in 2006 and which recently administered a $10 million Cultural Resource Fund for cultural heritage preservation projects for tribes and tribal communities. Since 2006,

== Personal life ==
Hopper married Clyde Warrior (1939–1968) of the Ponca Tribe of Indians of Oklahoma in 1965. She has three daughters: Mary Martha Warrior, Andrea Immogene Warrior and Gabriella Kathleen Honahni.

== Achievements and service ==
Other roles that Warrior has filled include:

- Consultant, Ponca Tribal bingo
- Consultant and chief operating officer, Yocha Dehe Wintun Nation (2007-2010)
- Consultant, Andrew Skeeter, Inc.
- Consultant, Santa Fe Indian School (2006)
- Consultant, Tulsa Indian Health Care Resource Center
- Advisor, American Indian Culture Museum
- Consultant, Native Arts & Cultures Foundation (2005-2007)
- Board Member, American Indian College Fund
- Board member, Wings of America
- Board member, Smithsonian National Museum of the American Indian
- Volunteer, National Organization of Native American Women
- Presidential Appointee, Board of Advisors, Tribal Colleges and Universities
- Charter member of World Indigenous Nations Higher Education Consortium

=== Awards ===
- Paul Harris Fellow, Rotary International (2005)
- Alice Paul Award, New Mexico Women's Foundation (2008)
- Woman of the Year, Albuquerque YWCA (2002)
- Oklahoma Women's Hall of Fame (2007)
- Star of the Southwest Award, Economic Development Administration, U.S. Department of Commerce (2004)
- Lifetime Achievement Award, Association of Tribal Archives, Libraries, and Museums (2018)
