= Ponca Tribe of Indians of Oklahoma =

Native American tribe in Oklahoma

Total population
- 3,783

Regions with significant populations
- United States ( Oklahoma)

Languages
- Omaha-Ponca language, English

Religion
- traditional tribal religion, Native American Church, Christianity

Related ethnic groups
- Omaha, Osage, Kaw, and Quapaw peoples.

The Ponca Tribe of Indians of Oklahoma, also known as the Ponca Nation, is one of two federally recognized tribes of Ponca people. The other is the Ponca Tribe of Nebraska. Traditionally, peoples of both tribes have spoken the Omaha-Ponca language, part of the Siouan-Catawban language family. They share many common cultural norms and characteristics with the Omaha, Osage, Kaw, and Quapaw peoples.

== Government ==
Map of Ponca Tribe of Indians of Oklahoma's tribal jurisdictional area (OTSA) and nearby jurisdiction areas.

The Ponca Tribe of Indians of Oklahoma has a democratically elected committee. The government offices are headquartered in White Eagle, near Ponca City, Oklahoma. Their tribal jurisdictional area includes parts of Kay and Noble counties. As of 2018, there were 3,783 enrolled tribal citizens. Enrollment in the tribe requires a 1/8 minimum blood quantum of Ponca blood, according to rules developed by the tribe.

=== Current administration ===
According to their written constitution, the seven-member governing council of the Ponca Tribe, called the Business Committee, is democratically elected for four-year terms. Among these, one person is elected as chairman. Other offices include vice chairman, and secretary/treasurer.

As of 2025, the current administration is:

- Tribal Chairman: Earl T. Howe, III
- Vice-Chairman: Rene' Kemble

== Economic development ==
The Ponca tribe first opened a casino in Ponca City, which is no longer operational. The Ponca opened a second casino in the same location, which also went out of business because of the 2008 recession.

In September 2020, the tribe opened up a casino in Perry, Oklahoma after a months-long delay due to the COVID-19 pandemic.

== Language and culture ==
In 2009, an estimated 33 tribal citizens spoke the Ponca language.

Since 1876 the tribe hosts an annual homecoming powwow. It takes place in August in Ponca City.

== History ==
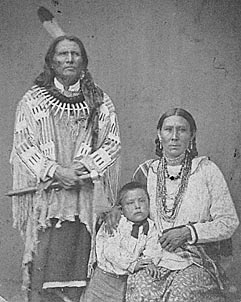
Standing Bear, his wife, and their son, all from Nebraska

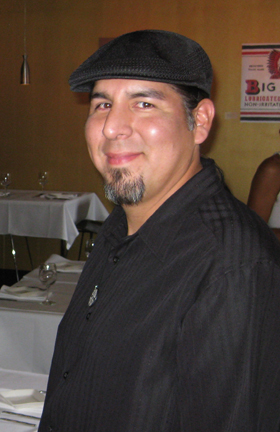
Brent Greenwood, contemporary Ponca artist

The Ponca tribe was one of five tribes (Ponca, Omaha, Osage, Kansa, and Quaqaw) that inhabited the area northeast of the Mississippi River. The Ponca and the Omaha tribe split from the others in the early 18th century as they were migrating west from the Great Lakes region prior to the arrival of Christopher Columbus. The Ponca eventually settled in present-day Nebraska and South Dakota. After European settlement, smallpox, measles, influenza and other introduced European diseases took a heavy toll on the numbers of the tribe repeatedly in the 18th and 19th centuries, as they had no immunity to these diseases. The more powerful Sioux, also known as the Lakota, took these opportunities to encroach on their land areas.

=== Treaties ===
The Ponca never went to war with the United States. They signed their first peace treaty with the US in 1817. In the 1825 they signed a trade agreement. Treaties in 1858 and 1865 ceded lands. The 1860s and 1870s were a difficult time for the Ponca tribe, as the buffalo were disappearing, droughts destroyed crops, and warfare with the Sioux combined to threaten the Ponca with starvation.

=== Removal ===
The US broke most of their treaty obligations to the Ponca. They gave land reserved for the Ponca to the Sioux in 1868, as part of the Great Sioux Reservation. The government relocated the Ponca to Indian Territory in 1877.

The forced removal of the Ponca from their former reservation in South Dakota to Indian Territory (in Oklahoma) was unacceptably mismanaged. The U.S. government failed to work with tribal leaders, and did not accept any input from them. Among the repercussions to the Ponca tribe were that they arrived too late to plant crops, the government failed to provide them with adequate supplies, and their assigned location was plagued with malaria. An estimated 158 Ponca died the first year after relocation: almost a third of the entire tribe. Among them was the oldest son of Standing Bear, a Ponca chief.

Standing Bear took his son's body back to Nebraska for burial in traditional lands. There he was arrested by the Army for having left the reservation, but he gained the sympathy of Brigadier General George Crook. With help from prominent attorneys working pro bono, Standing Bear filed a habeas corpus suit challenging his arrest. The US District Court judge's decision in Standing Bear v. Crook (1879) established the right of Indian people to exercise habeas corpus and their legal status as citizens under US law.

White Eagle, a principal Ponca chief, settled on a 101,000-acre (410 km^{2}) reservation in what would later be organized as Kay and Noble counties in Oklahoma. He was pressured under the allotment act to lease much of the land to the 101 Ranch for pasture (and later, oil development). In the 1890s missionaries and government agents tried to make the Ponca abandon their traditional tribal dances and ways of life in an attempt to "Americanize" them.

In 1892, under the Dawes Allotment Act, the US government created rolls of tribal citizens and allocated individual plots of land to each household. This was intended to introduce them to fee ownership and subsistence farming, as well as extinguish Indian tribal land claims in Oklahoma prior to its becoming a state. The government declared the remaining reservation land as "surplus" and sold it to European-American settlers, who were able to use it productively.

=== 20th century to present ===
The discovery of oil on Ponca lands in 1911 had mixed results for the people. Some became wealthy but others were taken advantage of by speculators and quickly lost their land.

Peyote religion was introduced in the 1910s. In 1918, Louis MacDonald and Frank Eagle, both educated Ponca, co-founded the Native American Church.

After many Ponca served in World War I, returning Ponca veterans founded the American Legion chapter Buffalo Post 38. In their community they revived traditional war dances, such as the heluska dance.

Under the 1936 Oklahoma Indian Welfare Act, the tribe reorganized their government. They ratified their constitution in 1950 and became federally recognized. Tribal headquarters were established in White Eagle, located south of Ponca City.

Clyde Warrior, a Ponca, cofounded the National Indian Youth Council. He promoted self-determination and inspired many young Native activists during the 1960s and 1970s.

In the years since allocation of plots under the Dawes Act, these land holdings and interests became highly divided among heirs. In addition, the departments of Interior and Treasury were found in the late 20th century to have mismanaged the fee accounts and payments due to holders of land for drilling and mineral leases. In 2009 the US government settled a major class action suit against it brought by Elouise Cobell (Blackfeet) in 1996, known as the Cobell v. Salazar suit.

The Ponca are participating in the Department of Interior's Land Buy-Back Program for Tribal Nations, developed as part of this settlement. In August 2016, Interior officials announced that it had offered approximately $7 million in purchase offers to "more than 1,300 landowners with fractional interests at the Ponca Tribe of Indians of Oklahoma" as part of the Land Buy-Back Program for Tribal Nations (Buy-Back Program). Recipients had 45 days to complete the transaction. This program is designed to purchase fractionated interests and transfer land back to tribes in trust, to increase their communal holdings and ability to better use the land.

In 2017, the Ponca Nation enacted a Rights of Nature law which is a resolution that gives the Ponca Tribal Court the power to punish crimes against nature with prison and fines.
