= Shirley Hill Witt =

American poet (born 1934)

- Born: April 17, 1934 (age 92); Whittier, California, U.S.
- Education: University of Michigan; University of New Mexico
- Occupations: Anthropologist; author; activist

Shirley Hill Witt (born April 17, 1934) is an anthropologist, educator, author, civil rights activist, and former foreign service officer. A member of the Akwesasne Mohawk Nation, Wolf Clan, Witt was one of the first Native American women to earn a Ph.D. She obtained her Ph.D. in evolutionary anthropology from the University of New Mexico in 1969. Witt has published extensively on Native Americans in addition to being a poet and fiction writer. She was a founding member of the National Indian Youth Council and worked with them from 1961 to 1964. She also served on the United States Commission on Civil Rights.

== Education ==
Witt received her B.A. from the University of Michigan in 1965 and her M.A. from the University of Michigan in 1966. She later obtained her Ph.D. in evolutionary anthropology from the University of New Mexico in 1969 with her dissertation "Migration into the San Juan Indian Pueblo, 1726-1968".

== Career ==
Witt has taught at the University of North Carolina at Chapel Hill (1970–1972) and Colorado College (1972–1974). She was the director of the Rocky Mountain Regional Office of the U.S. Commission on Civil Rights (1975–1983). Witt also served as the Cabinet Secretary for Natural Resources under New Mexico Governor Toney Anaya (1983–1985).

In 1985, Witt joined the U.S. diplomatic corps. As an employee of the U.S. Information Agency, she worked in South America (Venezuela and Paraguay) and Africa (Somalia and Zambia). She held positions of Foreign Service Officer, Cultural Affairs Officer, Binational Center Director, and deputy director of U.S.I.A.

In 2000, Witt was one of the plaintiffs in a sex-discrimination case against the United States Information Agency. The 1,100 women accused the agency of "manipulating the hiring process to exclude women, in some cases resorting to fraud, altering test scores and destroying personnel and test files." Witt reported waiting four years between being "led to believe that I did very well" on the hiring test in 1981 and being hired in 1985. Although the agency did not admit to any wrongdoing, each woman was awarded at least $460,000.

== Activism ==
Witt was active in the Indian rights movement during the 1960s. In 1961, she co-founded the National Indian Youth Council and served as its first vice president. Soon after, she joined protestors in the Puget Sound region in the fight to secure fishing rights guaranteed by treaty. Later that decade, she partnered with Council co-founder Herbert Blatchford to revitalize the Gallup Indian Center in New Mexico, where she was completing her PhD.

While at Colorado College, Dr. Hill, who preferred to be called by her maiden name, organized a protest through her class consisting of a group of CC women students who invaded El Pomar, the sports complex at Colorado College, and occupied one of the men's locker rooms as a protest for the lack of facilities for women. Hill taught the only class offered specifically for women, called "the Women's Course" in CC's anthropology department.

== Published works ==
- Witt, Shirley Hill and Steiner, Stan, The Way: An Anthology of American Indian Literature, Vintage Books, 1972, ISBN 9780394717692
- Witt, Shirley Hill, The Tuscaroras, Crowell-Collier Press, 1972, ISBN 9780027932706
- Witt, Shirley Hill and Ballejos, Gilberto Chávez, El Indio Jesús: A Novel, University of Oklahoma Press, 2000, ISBN 9780806132303
- Witt, Shirley Hill and Ballejos, Gilberto Chávez, Tomóchic Blood, AuthorHouse, 2006, ISBN 9781425932626
- Shreve, Bradley G., Red Power Rising: The National Indian Youth Council and the Origins of Native Activism (foreword), University of Oklahoma Press, 2012, ISBN 9780806184999
