= Cheyenne and Arapaho Tribes =

Federally recognized Southern Plains tribe in Oklahoma

Tsétsėhéstȧhese, Hinono'ei

Total population
- 12,185

Regions with significant populations
- Oklahoma, United States

Languages
- English, Arapaho, Cheyenne

Religion
- Christianity, Native American Church, Sun Dance, traditional tribal religions

Related ethnic groups
- Arapaho, Cheyenne, Gros Ventre, Blackfeet, and Suhtai

The Cheyenne and Arapaho Tribes are a united, federally recognized tribe of Southern Arapaho and Southern Cheyenne people in western Oklahoma. They are headquartered in Concho, Oklahoma.

== History ==
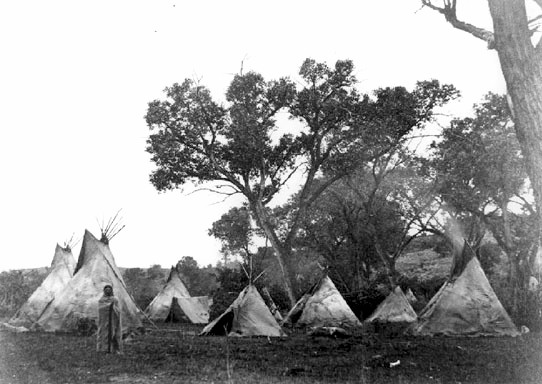
Arapaho camp, 1868

The Cheyenne and Arapaho are two distinct tribes with distinct histories. The Cheyenne (Tsétsėhéstȧhese, "The People", also spelled Tsitsistas) were once agrarian, or agricultural, people located near the Great Lakes in present-day Minnesota. Grinnell noted the Cheyenne language is a unique branch of the Algonquian language family and, The Nation itself, is descended from two related tribes, the Tsétsėhéstȧhese and the Só'taeo'o. The latter is believed to have joined the Tsétsėhéstȧhese in the early 18th century (1: 1–2). The Tsétsėhéstȧhese and the Só'taeo'o are characterized, and represented by two cultural heroes who received divine articles which shaped the time-honored belief systems of the Southern and Northern families of the Cheyenne Nation. The Só'taeo'o, represented by a man named Erect Horns, were blessed with the care of a sacred Buffalo Hat, which is kept among the Northern family. The Tsétsėhéstȧhese, represented by a man named Sweet Medicine (Motsé'eóeve), were bestowed with the care of a bundle of sacred Arrows, kept among the Southern Family. Inspired by Erect Horn (Tomȯsévėséhe)'s vision, they adopted the horse culture in the 18th century and moved westward onto the plains to follow the buffalo. The prophet Sweet Medicine organized the structure of Cheyenne society, including the Council of Forty-four peace chiefs and the warrior societies led by prominent warriors.

The Arapaho, or Hinono'ei, also Algonquian speaking, came from Saskatchewan, Montana, Wyoming, eastern Colorado, and western South Dakota in the 18th century. They adopted horse culture and became successful nomadic hunters. In 1800, the tribe began coalescing into northern and southern groups. Although the Arapaho had assisted the Cheyenne and Lakota in driving the Kiowa south from the Northern Plains, in 1840 they made peace with the tribe. They became prosperous traders, until the expansion of American settlers onto their lands after the American Civil War.

The Cheyenne and Arapaho formed an alliance in the 18th and 19th centuries. Together they were a formidable military force, successful hunters, and active traders with other tribes. At the height of their alliance, their combined hunting territories spanned from Montana to Texas.

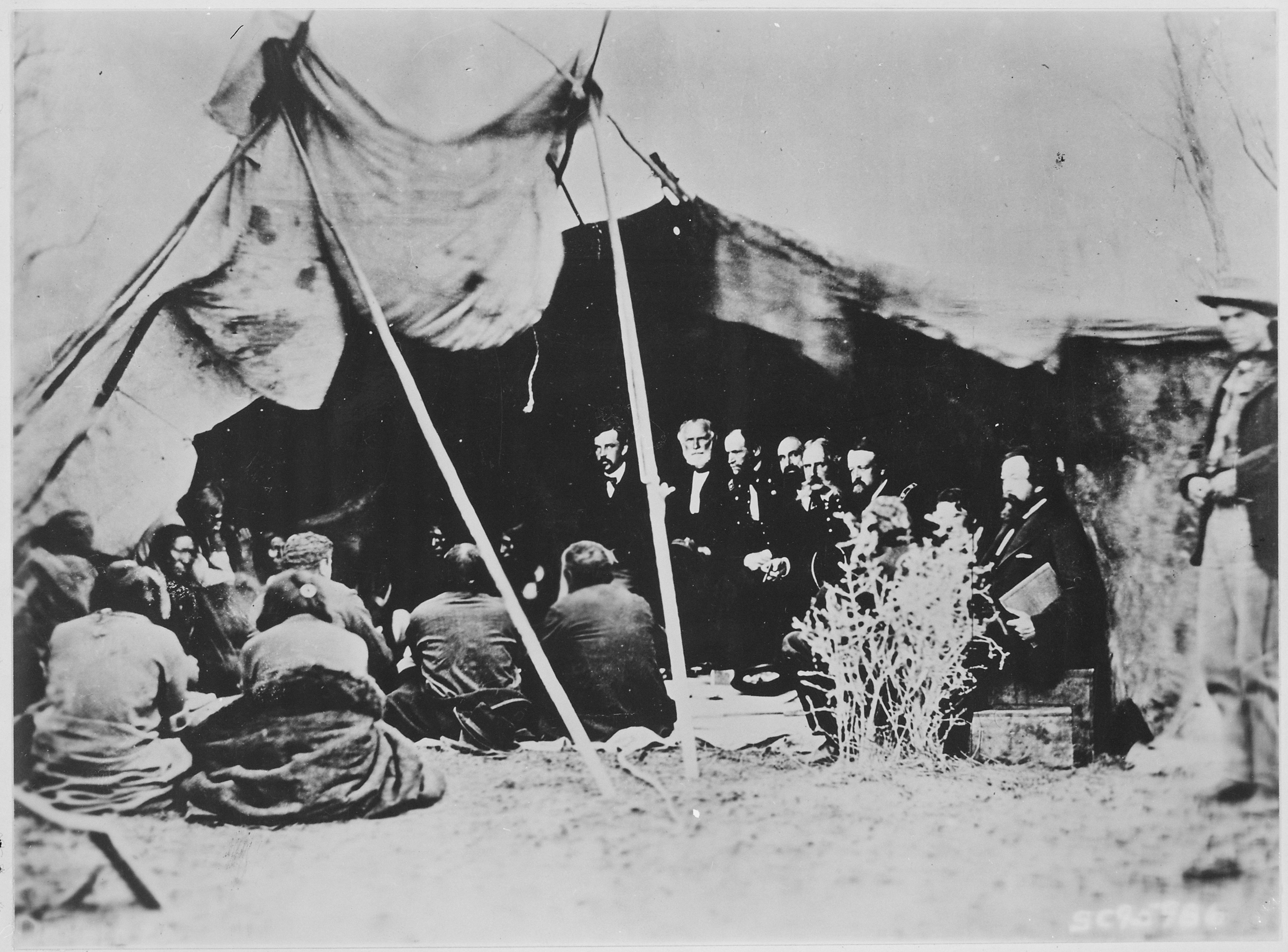
Signing the Ft. Laramie Treaty, 1868

The Arapaho signed the Fort Laramie Treaty with the U.S. in 1851. It recognized and guaranteed their rights to traditional lands in portions of Colorado, Kansas, Nebraska, and Wyoming. The U.S. could not enforce the treaty, however, and European-American trespassers overran Indian lands. There were repeated conflicts between settlers and members of the tribes.

The U.S. government brought the tribes to council again in 1867 to achieve peace under the Medicine Lodge Treaty. It promised the Arapaho a reservation in Kansas, but they disliked the location. They accepted a reservation with the Cheyenne in Indian Territory, so both tribes were forced to remove south near Fort Reno at the Darlington Agency in present-day Oklahoma.

The Dawes Act broke up the Cheyenne-Arapaho land base. All land not allotted to individual Indians was opened to settlement in the Land Run of 1892. The Curtis Act of 1898 dismantled the tribal governments in an attempt to have the tribal members assimilate to United States conventions and culture.

After the Oklahoma Indian Welfare Act passed in 1936, the Cheyenne and Arapaho organized a single tribal government in 1937. The Indian Self-Determination Act of 1975 further enhanced tribal development.

== Economic development ==
The tribe operates three tribal smoke shops and five casinos: the Lucky Star Casino in Clinton, the Lucky Star Casino in Concho, the Lucky Star Casino in Watonga, the Lucky Star Casino in Hammon, and the Lucky Star Casino in Canton. They also issue their own tribal vehicle tags. Their economic impact is estimated at $32 million.

== Government ==
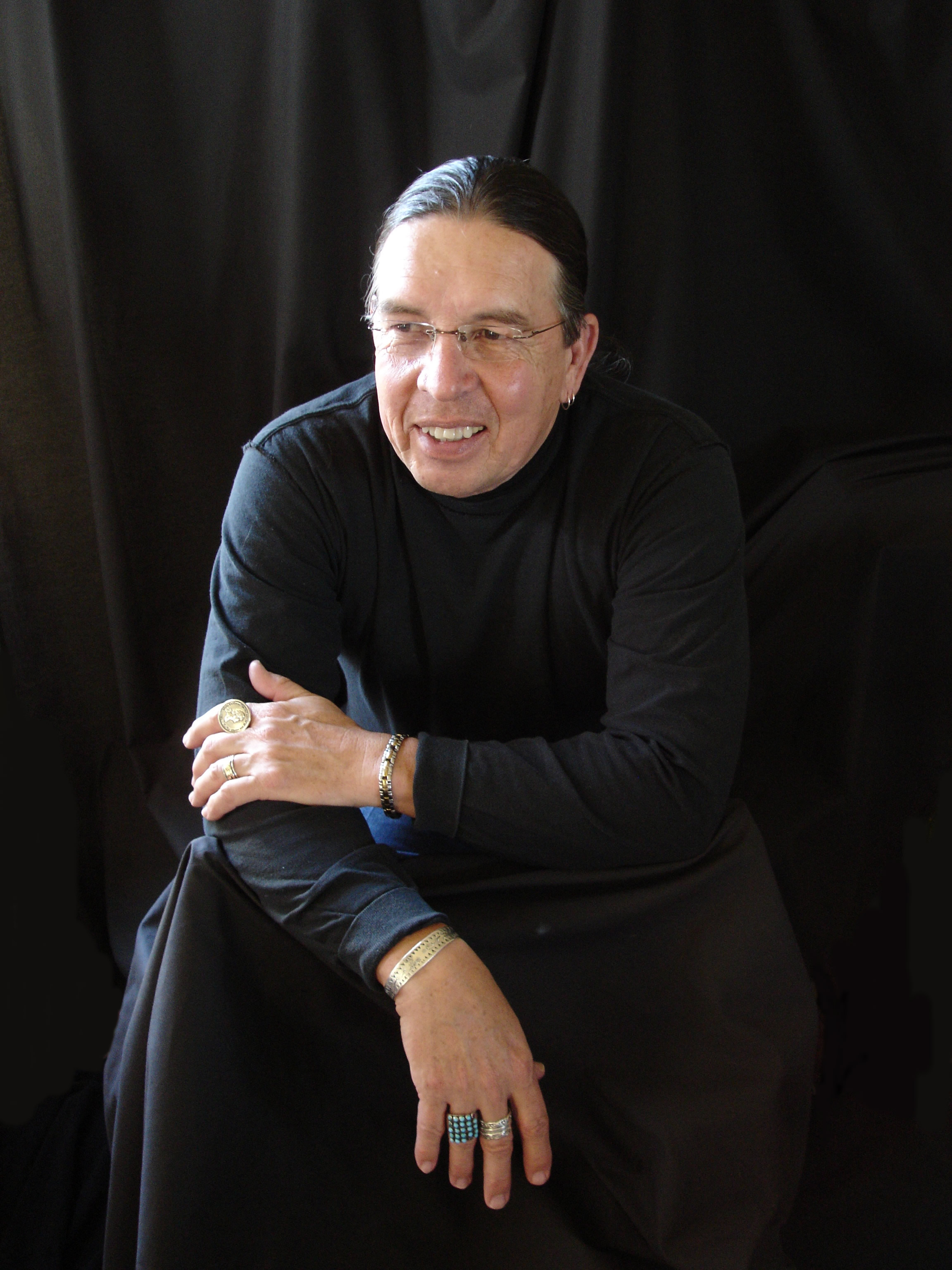
Cheyenne-Arapaho tribal member, peace chief, and artist, Harvey Pratt

Map of Cheyenne and Arapaho Tribes' tribal jurisdictional area (OTSA) and nearby jurisdiction areas.

The Cheyenne and Arapaho Tribes are headquartered in Concho, Oklahoma. Of 12,185 enrolled tribal citizens, 8,664 live within the state of Oklahoma. The tribal jurisdictional area includes Beckham, Blaine, Canadian, Custer, Dewey, Ellis, Kingfisher, Roger Mills, and Washita Counties.

The tribal government consists of the Tribal Council, Executive Branch, Legislative Branch, and Judicial Branch. The Tribal Council includes all tribal members over the age of 18. The Executive Branch is led by the Governor and Lieutenant Governor. The Legislative Branch is made up of legislators from the four Arapaho districts and four Cheyenne districts. The Judicial Branch includes a Supreme Court, including one Chief Justice and four Associate Justices; a Trial Court, composed of one Chief Judge and at least one Associate Judge; and any lower courts deemed necessary by the Legislature. In 2006 the tribes voted and ratified the Cheyenne and Arapaho Tribes Constitution which replaced the 1975 constitution.

In 2025, the tribal administration is:

- Governor: Reggie Wassana
- Lt. Governor: Hershel Gorham

== Institutions ==
The Cheyenne and Arapaho Tribal Tribune is the tribe's newspaper. ''CATV channel 47'' is the tribe's low power FCC licensed television station. CATV's call letters are K35MV-D. The Cheyenne-Arapaho Tribes of Oklahoma Culture and Heritage Program teaches hand games, powwow dancing and songs, horse care and riding, buffalo management, and Cheyenne and Arapaho language, and sponsored several running events.

=== College ===
In partnership with Southwestern Oklahoma State University, the tribe founded the Cheyenne and Arapaho Tribal College on August 25, 2006. Henrietta Mann, enrolled tribal member, was president in 2009. The campus was in Weatherford, Oklahoma and the school offered programs in Tribal Administration, American Indian Studies, and General Studies. The Cheyenne and Arapaho Tribal College Board of Regents voted to dissolve the Cheyenne and Arapaho Tribal College at the end of the 2015 spring semester. However, in September 2019 the tribe developed a replacement by chartering Bacone College in Muskogee, Oklahoma as its school.

=== Buffalo program ===
For cultural and food sovereignty purposes, a buffalo herd has been established. The herd expanded to 530 bison in 2021 when Denver Parks and Recreation donated 13 animals which will improve the herd's genetic diversity. Bison is the correct taxonomic term for Bison bison, but buffalo is the common vernacular term.

=== Historic Southern Cheyenne bands ===
The Southern Cheyenne are known as the Heévâhetaneo'o, or "Roped People." They are named after the most populous band, also commonly known as Sówoniá or "the Southern People."

- Heévâhetaneo'o / Hevhaitaneo proper (Hévhaitanio – "Haire Rope Men", "Hairy People", also ″Fur Men″) In the past they were close affiliated to Arapaho. Known as great warriors and noted among the Cheyenne as the best horse tamers and horse raiders from surrounding tribes, especially from the horse-rich Kiowa (Vétapâhaetó'eo'o) and Comanche (Šé'šenovotsétaneo'o) to the south. They formed in 1826 under their Chief Yellow Wolf (Ho'néoxheóvaestse) together with some Arapaho. They migrated along with some other Cheyenne bands south of the Platte River (Meneo'hé'e – ″Moon Shell River″) toward the Arkansas River (Mótsėsóoneo'hé'e – ″Flint River″) and the establishment of Bents Fort. Their tribal lands were between the Southern Oévemanaho in the west, the Wotápio in the east and the Dog Soldiers and Hesé'omeétaneo'o in the north. The Cholera Outbreak of 1849 killed many of the band. About half of the band perished in the Sand Creek Massacre, including the chiefs Yellow Wolf and Big Man. They are today predominant among the Southern Cheyenne.
- Hesé'omeétaneo'o / Hisiometaneo (Hisíometanio or Issiometaniu – "Ridge People/Men" or ″Hill Band″, also given as ″Pipestem (River) People″) Originally part of the Heévâhetaneo'o, they had close ties with the Oglala and Sičháŋǧu (Brulé) Lakota. They first lived just south of the Masikota along the Niobrara River north of the North Platte River in Nebraska, then later moved south into the hill country along the Upper Smoky Hill River and north of the Upper Arkansas River in Colorado – in lands mostly west of the closely associated Southern Só'taeo'o and Dog Soldiers band and north of the Southern Oévemanaho and Heévâhetaneo'o, ranged sometimes with Comanche south onto the Staked Plains. Under chief White Antelope, many died in the Sand Creek Massacre.
- Heviksnipahis / Iviststsinihpah ("Aorta People" or "Burnt Aorta People"; as caretakers for the Sacred Arrows, they were also considered as the Tsétsêhéstâhese / Tsitsistas proper or known to the other bands as ″Arrow People″) Originally living along the forks of the Cheyenne River and in the eastern Black Hills in western Wyoming, they moved between 1815 and 1825 south to the forks of the North and South Platte River (Vétaneo'hé'e – ″Fat River″ or ″Tallow River″). Their lands were a central location for all bands and convenient for the performance of the annual ceremonies. Later, they moved further south and ranged between the Dog Soldiers band in the north, the Oo'kóhta'oná in the southeast, the Hónowa and Wotápio in the south.
- Hónowa / Háovȯhnóvȧhese / Nėstamenóoheo'o (Háovôhnóva, Hownowa, Hotnowa – "Poor People", also known as ″Red Lodges People″) They lived south of the Oo'kóhta'oná and east of the Wotápio.
- Southern Oévemanaho / Oivimána (Southern Oévemana – "Southern Scabby", "Southern Scalpers") Originally part of the Heévâhetaneo'o, they were close affiliated to Arapaho and moved together under Chief Yellow Wolf in 1826 south of the Platte River to the Arkansas River. They lived south and west of the Heévâhetaneo'o. Led by War Bonnet they lost about half their number in the Sand Creek Massacre. They now live near Watonga (Tséh-ma'ėho'a'ē'ta – ″where there are red (hills) facing together″, also called Oévemanâhéno – ″scabby-band-place″) and Canton, Blaine County, on lands of the former Cheyenne and Arapaho Indian Reservation in Oklahoma.
- Masikota ("Crickets", "Grasshoppers", ″Grey Hair(ed) band″, ″Flexed Leg band″ or ″Wrinkled Up band″) Named perhaps from the Lakotiyapi word mazikute – "iron (rifle) shooters", from mazi – "iron" and kute – "to shoot", mixed Cheyenne-Lakota band. They were known by the latter as 'Sheo', lived southeast of the Black Hills along the White River (Vóhpoome), intermarried with Oglala Lakota and Sičháŋǧu Oyáte (Brule Lakota) and was the first group of the tribal unit on the Plains. Hence their name First Named. The cholera epidemic of 1849 almost wiped them out. Afterwards they joined the military society Dog Soldiers (Hotamétaneo'o), which took their place as a band in the Cheyenne tribal circle. They were not present at the Sand Creek Massacre. They played an important role at Battle of Summit Springs of 1869.
- Oo'kóhta'oná / Ohktounna (Oktogona, Oktogana, Oqtóguna or Oktoguna – "Bare Legged", "Protruding Jaw") Their name refers to the art of dancing the Deer Dance before going to war. They formerly associated with the mixed Cheyenne-Lakota Masikota band, sometimes considered a Masikota subband. They lived north of the Hónowa and south of the Heviksnipahis,. The cholera epidemic of 1849 almost wiped them out. They might have joined the Dog Soldiers afterwards.
- Wotápio / Wutapai (from the Lakotiyapi word Wutapiu: – "Eat with Lakota-Sioux", "Half-Cheyenne", "Cheyenne-Sioux") They were originally a band of Lakota Sioux who later joined the Southern Cheyenne. By 1820 they had moved south to the Arkansas River in Colorado, where they lived and camped together with their Kiowa allies. Through intermarriage they became a mixed Cheyenne-speaking and identifying hybrid Cheyenne-Kiowa band with Lakota origin. Their hunting lands were between the Hónowa in the east, the Heévâhetaneo'o to the west, and the Heviksnipahis to the north. They were the band hardest hit by the Sand Creek Massacre.
- Southern Só'taeo'o / Só'taétaneo'o (Suhtai or Sutaio) They married only other Só'taeo'o (Northern or Southern alike) and always camped separately from the other Cheyenne camp. They maintained closest ties to the Hesé'omeétaneo'o band, joined with the emerging Dog Soldiers band lands along the Smoky Hill River (Mano'éo'hé'e – ″gather(timber) river″), Saline (Šéstotó'eo'hé'e – "Cedar River") and Solomon Rivers (Ma'xêhe'néo'hé'e – "turkey-creek"), in north-central Kansas. Their favorite hunting grounds were north of the Dog Soldiers along the upper sub-basins of the Republican River (Ma'êhóóhévâhtseo'hé'e – ″Red Shield River″, so named because there gathered the warriors of the Ma'ėhoohēvȧhtse (Red Shield Warriors Society)) especially along the Beaver Creek, which was also a spiritual place. The Hesé'omeétaneo'o mostly ranged west and northwest of them.

Lesser southern bands (not represented in the Council of Forty-Four):

- Moiseo / Moiseyu (Monsoni – "Flint-Men", called after the Flintmen Society (Motsêsóonetaneo'o)) They were also called Otata-voha – "Blue Horses", after Blue Horse, the first leader of the Coyote Warriors Society (O'ôhoménotâxeo'o). Both were branches of the Fox Warriors Society (Vóhkêséhetaneo'o or Monêsóonetaneo'o), one of the four original Cheyenne military societies, also known as ″Flies.″ Originally a Sioux band from Minnesota, the greater part left the Cheyenne about 1815 joining Sioux bands in Minnesota. The remaining associated strongly with / or joined the Wotápio.
- Ná'kuimana / Nakoimana (Nakoimanah – "Bear People")

The ten principal bands that had the right to send four chief delegates representing them in the Council of Forty-Four were the

1. Heviksnipahis (Iviststsinihpah, also known as the Tsétsêhéstâhese / Tsitsistas proper)
2. Heévâhetaneo'o (Hevhaitaneo)
3. Masikota (in Lakotiyapi: Sheo)
4. Omísis (Ôhmésêheseo'o, the Notameohmésêhese proper)
5. Só'taeo'o / Só'taétaneo'o (Suhtai or Sutaio, Northern and Southern)
6. Wotápio (Wutapai)
7. Oévemanaho (Oivimána or Oévemana, Northern and Southern)
8. Hesé'omeétaneo'o (Hisiometaneo or Issiometaniu)
9. Oo'kóhta'oná (Ohktounna or Oqtóguna)
10. Hónowa (Háovȯhnóvȧhese or Nėstamenóoheo'o)

After the Masikota and Oo'kóhta'oná bands had been almost wiped out through a cholera epidemic in 1849, the remaining Masikota joined the Dog Soldiers warrior society (Hotamétaneo'o). They effectively became a separate band and in 1850 took over the position in the camp circle formerly occupied by the Masikota. The members often opposed policies of peace chiefs such as Black Kettle. Over time, the Dog Soldiers took a prominent leadership role in the wars against the whites. In 1867, most of the band were killed by United States Army forces in the Battle of Summit Springs.

Due to an increasing division between the Dog Soldiers and the council chiefs with respect to policy towards the whites, the Dog Soldiers separated from the other Cheyenne bands. They effectively became a third division of the Cheyenne people, between the Northern Cheyenne, who ranged north of the Platte River, and the Southern Cheyenne, who occupied the area north of the Arkansas River.

== Notable tribal citizens ==
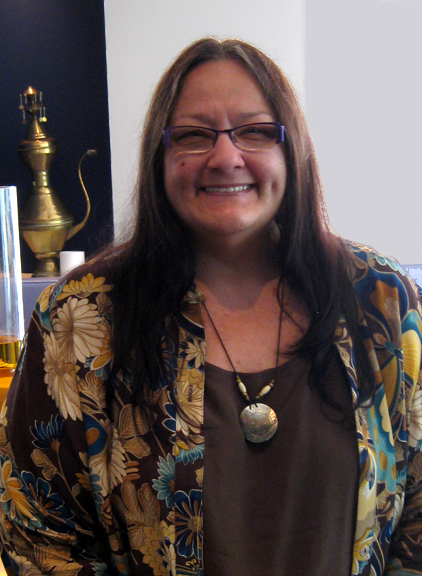
Suzan Shown Harjo, Cheyenne-Muscogee activist, author, poet, and policy maker

- Ross Anderson, professional World Cup skier
- William "Hawk" Birdshead, filmmaker, philanthropist, spiritualist
- Jimmy Carl Black, Drummer and Vocalist for The Mothers of Invention
- Archie Blackowl (1911–1992), Flatstyle painter
- Chris Eyre, film director and producer, directed the films: Smoke Signals and Skins
- Suzan Shown Harjo, Southern Cheyenne/Muscogee activist, policymaker, journalist, and poet
- Viola Hatch (1930–2019), activist, policymaker, tribal elder, former tribal chairperson
- Lance Henson, poet, painter
- Yvonne Kauger, Oklahoma Supreme Court Justice
- Chief Little Raven (ca. 1810–1889), Arapaho chief and signer of 1867 Medicine Lodge Treaty
- Merlin Little Thunder, Southern Cheyenne artist, noted for miniature paintings
- Henrietta Mann (born 1934) academic and developer of Native American studies curricula at the University of California, Berkeley; University of Montana; and Haskell Indian Nations University
- Gilbert Miles, former lieutenant governor of the tribes
- Chief Niwot (1825–1864), Southern Arapaho leader
- St. David Pendleton Oakerhater, Okuhhatuh, or Making Medicine, Southern Cheyenne (1847–1931), veteran of the Red River War, Fort Marion prisoner of war, ledger artist, deacon of Whirlwind Mission, sun dancer, canonized saint in the Episcopal Church
- Tommy Orange (born 1982), Southern Cheyenne novelist
- Harvey Pratt (Cheyenne-Arapaho), artist, peace chief, forensic artist
- Henry Roman Nose (1856–1917), Southern Cheyenne chief
- W. Richard West Sr., Dick West, or Wahpahnahyah (1912–1996), Southern Cheyenne painter, educator, and Director of Art at Bacone College
- W. Richard West Jr., Cheyenne lawyer and first director of the National Museum of the American Indian
- Wolf Robe (ca. 1840–1910), former tribal chief

== See also ==
- Cheyenne and Arapaho Indian Reservation
