= Jennie R. Joe =

Navajo nurse, academic, and medical anthropologist

- Born: Jennie Rose Joe; 1941 (age 84–85); Farmington, San Juan County, New Mexico
- Other names: Jennie Joe Noswood
- Citizenship: Navajo
- Occupations: nurse, academic, activist
- Years active: 1964–present

Jennie R. Joe (Navajo, born 1941) is an American academic, medical anthropologist, and fellow of the Society for Applied Anthropology. Initially trained as a nurse, she was one of the health clinic workers during Occupation of Alcatraz in 1969. She is a professor in the Departments of Family and Community Medicine and American Indian Studies at the University of Arizona. Joe was one of the inaugural board members for the Smithsonian's National Museum of the American Indian and serves on the board of the Urban Indian Health Commission.

== Early life and education ==
Jennie Rose Joe was born in 1941 in Farmington, San Juan County, New Mexico, to Pauline N. (née Beyale) and Charley Joe. She grew up on the Navajo Reservation, attending Crownpoint School, and then boarded at the Riverside Indian School in Anadarko, Oklahoma. She graduated from the University of New Mexico as a public health nurse in 1964 and having been commissioned as an ensign in the United States Navy Nurse Corps, completed her training in Newport, Rhode Island following her schooling.

== Career and activism ==
After her graduation, Joe worked for the Indian Health Service, spending three years in northern New Mexico before transferring to North Dakota. Wanting to continue her education, Joe moved to California and completed her master's degree in public health at the University of California, Berkeley. Joe, and Dorothy Lonewolf Miller (Blackfoot) both assisted nurse Stella Leach (Colville-Oglala Lakota), who established the health clinic on Alcatraz Island during the 1969 Occupation of Alcatraz. In 1971, she was one of the women involved in the formation of the National Indian Women's Action Corps, an empowerment organization for Native American women. The organizing officers included Lonewolf Miller, president; Grace Thorpe (Sac & Fox), vice president; Leach, 2nd vice president; Woesha Cloud North (Ho-Chunk), secretary; Henrietta Whiteman (Cheyenne), treasurer; and Joe, sergeant-at-arms.

After completing a second master's degree from UC Berkeley, in anthropology, Joe consulted with the California State Health Department on Indian health. While working at the California Department of Health, she assisted in founding the first program to address child abuse and neglect in the urban Indian community, which resulted in the establishment of the Urban Indian Child Resource Center of Oakland. In 1976, working part-time, Joe went on to study for her PhD in medical anthropology at UC Berkeley. Jennie Joe Noswood completed her dissertation on Navajo children with disabilities and was the first Navajo to earn a doctorate from UC Berkeley. Graduating in 1980, she worked as a research associate for the Institute for Scientific Analysis, focusing on American Indian issues. Joe then became an associate professor at UCLA in the Anthropology and American Indian Studies department.

In 1986, Joe took a leave of absence from UCLA to assist the University of Arizona in developing a curriculum on disabilities and rehabilitation for indigenous people. She was involved in the research project, considered a landmark investigation into the needs of Native Americans, for the United States Department of Education. By the time the report, A Study of the Special Problems and Needs of American Indians with Handicaps Both on and off the Reservation, was completed in 1987, she had been hired as the co-director of the Native American Research and Training Center at the University of Arizona. By 1990, Joe was teaching as an associate professor and sole director of the Research and Training Center for the university. That year she was selected by the Smithsonian Institution to serve as one of 12 members on the inaugural board of the National Museum of the American Indian, which was to be constructed.

Joe's work as a medical anthropologist involves evaluating health from a cultural perspective, including reluctance to remove traditional foods from the diet, taboos regarding touching preventing breast examinations, among other practices, which may result in minority populations receiving disparate health care services. Among her topics of interest are diabetes, alcoholism and substance abuse, and the impact of forced removal and location on indigenous populations. In addition to her work in the Family and Community Medicine Department, Joe teaches in the faculty of American Indian Studies and is an elected fellow of the Society for Applied Anthropology. She serves on the board of the Urban Indian Health Commission, an initiative of the Robert Wood Johnson Foundation and the Urban Indian Health Institute of Seattle.

== Selected works ==
- Joe, Jennie R. (April 1982). "Cultural Influences on Navajo Mothers with Disabled Children". American Indian Quarterly. 6 (1–2). Lincoln, Nebraska: University of Nebraska Press: 170–190. doi:10.2307/1183602. ISSN 1534-1828. JSTOR 1183602.
- Joe, Jennie R. (1985). Final Report: The Effects of Forced Relocation of a Traditional People. San Francisco, California: Institute for Scientific Analysis. OCLC 311624582.
- Joe, Jennie R.; Kunitz, Stephen J. (October 1985). "Disease Change and the Role of Medicine: The Navajo Experience". American Indian Quarterly. 9 (4). Lincoln, Nebraska: University of Nebraska Press: 463–465. doi:10.2307/1183581. ISSN 1534-1828. JSTOR 1183581.
- Joe, Jennie R. (1987). "Forced Relocation and Assimilation: Dillon Myer and the Native American". Amerasia Journal. 13 (2). Los Angeles, California: Taylor & Francis for the Asian American Studies Center at the University of California: 161–165. doi:10.17953/amer.13.2.y611250441323112. ISSN 0044-7471.
- Joe, Jennie R. (1988). "Government Policies and Disabled People in American Indian Communities". Disability, Handicap and Society. 3 (3). Abingdon-on-Thames, Oxfordshire: Taylor & Francis: 253–262. ISSN 0968-7599.
- Joe, Jennie R.; Miller, Dorothy Lonewolf (1989). "Barriers and Survival: A Study of an Urban Indian Health Center". American Indian Culture and Research Journal. 13 (3–4). Los Angeles, California: American Indian Culture and Research Center at the University of California: 233–256. doi:10.17953/aicr.13.3-4.5613516316x12124 (inactive October 14, 2025). ISSN 0161-6463. OCLC 427028251.
- Joe, Jennie Rose; Young, Robert S. (1994). Diabetes as a Disease of Civilization: The Impact of Culture Change on Indigenous Peoples. Berlin: Walter de Gruyter. ISBN 978-3-11-013474-2.
- Joe, Jennie R. (March 2001). "Out of Harmony: Health Problems and Young Native American Men". Journal of American College Health. 49 (5). Abingdon-on-Thames, Oxfordshire: Routledge for the American College Health Association: 237–242. doi:10.1080/07448480109596309. ISSN 0744-8481. OCLC 4652702520. PMID 11337899. S2CID 19503123.
- Young, Robert S.; Joe, Jennie R. (September 2009). "Some Thoughts About the Epidemiology of Alcohol and Drug Use Among American Indian/Alaska Native Populations". Journal of Ethnicity in Substance Abuse. 8 (3). New York, New York: Haworth Press: 223–241. doi:10.1080/15332640903110443. ISSN 1533-2640. OCLC 4902341648. PMID 25985068. S2CID 22906431.
- Joe, Jennie R.; Gachupin, Francine C., eds. (2012). Health and Social Issues of Native American Women. Santa Barbara, California: ABC-CLIO. ISBN 978-0-313-39714-1.
