= Woesha Cloud North =

Native American teacher, artist, and activist (1918–1992)

- North teaching in the experimental school at Alcatraz, 1971
- Born: Anne Woesha Cloud; September 7, 1918; Wichita, Kansas
- Died: October 10, 1992 (aged 74); Fresno, California
- Other name: Woesha North
- Occupations: teacher, artist, activist
- Years active: 1941–1989
- Children: 5; including Renya K. Ramirez
- Parent(s): Elizabeth Bender Roe Cloud; Henry Roe Cloud
- Relatives: Chief Bender (uncle)

Woesha Cloud North (September 7, 1918, in Ho-Chunk-Ojibwe – October 10, 1992) was an American artist, teacher, and activist. She taught in the Palo Alto Public schools from 1961 to 1969 and then assisted in running the school during the Occupation of Alcatraz. From the early 1970s, she began to teach at the university level, teaching art at San Francisco State College, the University of Nebraska–Lincoln, and California State University, Fresno. Throughout her life, she was active in women's organizations and organizations focused on indigenous people. Posthumously, her service was honored with an induction into Stanford's Multicultural Alumni Hall of Fame in 1995.

== Early life and education ==
Anne Woesha Cloud was born on September 7, 1918, in Wichita, Kansas, to Elizabeth Georgiana (née Bender) and Henry Roe Cloud. On her father's side, Cloud was Ho-Chunk and on her mother's, Ojibwe. Her father was a teacher who founded the American Indian Institute of Wichita, and later was the superintendent of the Haskell Institute in Lawrence, Kansas. Her mother was a teacher and taught at the institute, managed the finances, acted as matron, and advised on the school administration. Cloud was the couple's second daughter, and she had an older sister, Elizabeth Marion (born 1917), and three younger siblings, Lillian Alberta (born 1920), Ramona Clark (born 1922) and Henry Jr. (1926–1929). When her brother died, they adopted Jay Hunter, according to Ho-Chunk custom. Her parents were strong advocates of higher education and Cloud obtained an undergraduate degree from Vassar College in 1940.

== Career ==
After her graduation, Cloud worked for the Bureau of Indian Affairs, teaching as an apprentice at the Phoenix Indian School, before being sent to teach as an arts and crafts instructor on the Pine Ridge Indian Reservation. After teaching for two years, Cloud married a non-Native, Robert Carver North on August 14, 1943, in Walterboro, South Carolina. Robert served in the U.S. Army during World War II and participated in the Battle of Saipan. While he was away, North completed a master's degree in painting and fine arts under L. C. Mitchell at Ohio University in 1944 and then moved to Cambridge, Massachusetts. By the late 1940s they had moved to California and both were studying at Stanford University. Robert became a professor at Stanford and North devoted time to raising their five children. Her daughter, Renya K. Ramirez, is an anthropologist and author.

North became a regular exhibitor of art in the San Francisco Bay Area and when her children were old enough, she returned to teaching. In 1961, she became an art teacher for the Palo Alto public school system. On December 2, 1969, Cloud went to Alcatraz Island to participate in the events unfolding there among Native American people. Just over a week later, when the All Tribes Elementary School was founded, she began teaching at the experimental school. Along with traditional reading and math courses, students were given classes in Native culture. During the week, North remained on the island but on weekends returned to care for her family. In May 1970, she returned home, but continued commuting to the island two days a week to teach art classes, until the government forced the remaining American Indians to abandon the occupation in June 1971.

In the fall of 1970, North joined in the founding of the National Indian Women's Action Corps, an empowerment organization for Native American women. The organizing officers included Dorothy Lonewolf Miller (Blackfoot), president; Grace Thorpe (Sac & Fox), vice president; Stella Leach (Colville-Oglala Lakota), 2nd vice president; North, secretary; Henrietta Whiteman (Cheyenne), treasurer; and Jennie R. Joe (Navajo), sergeant-at-arms. She was also a founder of the American Indian and Alaska Native Caucus for the American Public Health Association. In the early 1970s, she began teaching at San Francisco State College and completed a second master's degree at Stanford in 1972, in art education.

In 1975, she and Robert divorced, and North moved to Lincoln, Nebraska. She graduated with her PhD in educational history and philosophy in 1978 from the University of Nebraska–Lincoln and then taught in the ethnic studies department at Lincoln. When she was not teaching, she produced and exhibited art works. She participated in exhibits in the Bay Area and at the Heard Museum from 1966 to 1975. Her work was also shown in 1975 in Sacramento for the Governor's Minority Art Native American Exhibit. In 1983, her paintings were featured in the exhibit, Recent Paintings by North and Yazzie, hosted by the U. S. Department of the Interior at the Sioux Indian Museum in Rapid City, South Dakota. Her painting style originally was realistic, but later works used symbolism, cubism, and impressionism to depict family as a part of the greater universe, blending in images of traditional Native elements. In 1984, she returned to the west coast to be near her daughters. She moved to Fresno and taught at California State University until her retirement.

== Death and legacy ==
North died on October 10, 1992, in Fresno. Posthumously, in 1995, her artwork was featured as part of the exhibit, Our Art, Our Voices: Native American Cultural Perspectives, in honor of the silver jubilee of the Stanford American Indian Organization. In 1996, she was inducted into the Multicultural Alumni Hall of Fame of Stanford, for her service to the American Indian community and "society at large".
