= Stella Leach =

Native American nurse and activist

- Leach by Ilka Hartmann, circa 1970–1971
- Born: Stella Nellie Runnels; June 12, 1918; Ferry County, Washington, US
- Died: January 29, 2010 (aged 91); Grant, Washington, US
- Other names: Stella Bray
- Occupations: nurse, activist
- Years active: 1959–2000

Stella Leach (June 12, 1918 – January 29, 2010) was a Colville-Oglala Lakota nurse and activist who was known for her work in establishing the first American Indian children's wellness center in the San Francisco Bay Area, setting up the health clinic during the Occupation of Alcatraz, and her activism for native American self-determination.

== Early life and education ==
Stella Nellie Runnels was born on June 12, 1918, in Ferry County, Washington to Maud/Maude Stella (née Sears) and Hiram Bagley Runnels. Her mother was enrolled as a Pine Ridge Sioux, along with her half-sister Pearl Stirk and oldest brother Raymond Runnels. Maude had previously been married to James Stirk, but he and their son James, Jr. died before 1907. Runnels and her siblings — Mary E (1908), John A. (1909), George W. (1912), Louis (1914), Juanita Elsie (1915), William Riley (1920), Josephine Myrtle (1921), Clara (1923), Hiram Jr. (1924), and Thaddeus (1927) — were enrolled with their father in the Confederated Tribes of the Colville Reservation. The children began their schooling in Keller, Washington, but when Runnels was 10, they taken from their father's farm and sent by Indian Agency officials to American Indian boarding schools.

On July 9, 1936, at Davenport, Washington, Runnels married Johnnie Bray. The couple had two sons, Kenneth Patrick and Garry Thomas Bray, before they separated in 1940. She later had four other children and married Harry Leland Leach, Sr. During the 1950s, Leach was critical of the Colville tribes' involvement with the National Congress of American Indians and the NCAI's backing of investigations on Un-American activities and McCarthyism. By 1959, the couple had divorced, and Leach moved to Oakland, California as part of the Indian Relocation Program.

== Career and activism ==
When Leach arrived in the San Francisco Bay Area with her 6 children, she intended to go to school, but the Relocation Act required her to get a job. She joined the staff of the Peralta Hospital as a nurse's aide. She eventually was able to transfer to the night shift and enrolled at Laney College, earning her certificate as a licensed practical nurse (LPN). She began working as a nurse for Dr. David Tepper and actively worked to improve medical care for the urban Indian population in the Bay Area. Because health care for Native Americans had been removed from federal programs in 1955 and given to states to administer, lack of funding resulted in an inability for urban Indians to obtain treatment anywhere. Leach served as the chair of the Bay Area Indian Council's health and welfare section. In 1964, the Council formed a successful partnership with Pacific Hospital to initiate the first children's and "well-baby" clinic directed to American Indians in the area, known as the All-Indian Well Baby Clinic.

In January 1968, as chair of the health and welfare division, Leach met with Senators Paul Fannin (Republican) and Robert F. Kennedy (Democrat) at the American Indian Center to discuss a series of issues including insufficient relocation allowances, insufficient medical funding, inadequate educational opportunities, and difficulties with draft registration. She was concerned about veterans' issues, as five of her six children had served in the Vietnam War. Shortly after the meeting, in May, Leach and her children began receiving racist and threatening calls at their residence near Mills College. Their home was broken into and vandalized, and their rent was quadrupled, when their neighbors and landlord realized they were American Indians. Senator Kennedy sent aides to stay in the house overnight, as the property doors had been removed. Initially, the Leach family intended to remain in their home, but as tension continued, they moved to the East Bay area.

Leach joined her son David, who was in the November 20 landing party for the Occupation of Alcatraz, on November 22, 1969. Her sons David and Gary Leach, both veterans, were participants in the standoff. She set up and directed the health clinic on Alcatraz Island and was assisted by Jennie R. Joe (Navajo) and Dorothy Lonewolf Miller (Blackfoot), as nurses, and Robert Brennan and Richard Fine, as doctors. Leach's employer, Dr. Tepper allowed her to stay on the island for three months and volunteered his services once a week. After Richard Oakes (Mohawk) left the island, Leach was one of the seven representatives selected as members of the board of directors for the Indians of All Tribes and was a spokesperson for the board. The goals of the council were to establish a Native American center on Alcatraz to promote cultural study, as well as training in spiritual and ecological matters from an indigenous perspective. Leach stressed the importance of American Indians being able to determine their own future.

In 1970, Leach also participated in the founding of the National Indian Women's Action Corps, an empowerment organization for Native American women. The organizing officers included Dorothy Lonewolf Miller, president; Grace Thorpe (Sac & Fox), vice president; Leach, 2nd vice president; Woesha Cloud North (Ho-Chunk), secretary; Henrietta Whiteman (Cheyenne), treasurer; and Jennie Joe, sergeant-at-arms. When the occupation ended, Leach and other activists from Alcatraz, like John Trudell (Santee Dakota) moved on to occupy the abandoned Nike Missile site at Richmond, California, but were removed in June 1971.

In the 1980s, Leach returned to using her maiden name of Runnels. She worked to help her son Harry Leach, Jr., a recipient of the Bronze Star Medal and a Purple Heart, who had been diagnosed with schizophrenia, "triggered by his military service". Harry was accused of threatening to poison water supplies in San Jose, as well as Caesars Tahoe and Sahara Tahoe, both in Stateline, Nevada. His case brought the mental health of Vietnam veterans and the inadequate care they were receiving into the spotlight of the national media. After his acquittal, Runnels remarried and moved to Sonoma, California where the couple operated a chicken ranch. She returned to Washington, locating in Nespelem around 2000 and remained active in issues effecting the Colville Indian Reservation.

== Death and legacy ==
Runnels died on January 29, 2010, in Mason County, Washington. She was buried near her family members in the Sacred Heart Cemetery in Nespelem. She was interviewed as part of the American Indian Historical Research Project in 1970 by Anna Boyd. Her interview is in the holdings of the Doris Duke Oral History Collection at the University of New Mexico in Albuquerque.
