= Henrietta Mann =

Native American academic and activist

- Ho'oesto'oona'e
- Born: Henrietta Verle Mann; 1934 (age 91–92); Clinton, Custer County, Oklahoma
- Other names: Henri Mann, Henri Mann Morton, Henrietta Whiteman
- Citizenship: Cheyenne and Arapaho Tribes, United States
- Occupations: academic, activist
- Years active: 1954–present

Henrietta Verle Mann (Cheyenne: Ho'oesto'óoná'e; b. 1934) is a Southern Cheyenne Native American academic and activist. She was one of the designers of the University of California, Berkeley, the University of Montana and Haskell Indian Nations University's Native American studies programs. In 2000 she became the first American Indian to hold the endowed chair of Native American studies at Montana State University and was honored with the Montana Governor's Humanities Award. She retired in 2004 and became a special advisor to the president of Montana State University.

== Early life and education ==
Henrietta Verle "Henri" Mann was born in 1934 in Clinton, Custer County, Oklahoma to Lanora E. and Henry Mann. The Manns were enrolled in the Cheyenne and Arapaho Tribes of Oklahoma. Her father was a farmer and raised cattle on his family's allotment near Hammon, Oklahoma and her mother raised chickens. Her great-grandmothers were White Buffalo Woman, one of the survivors of the Sand Creek massacre, and Vister, a survivor of the Washita Massacre. Her mother was a Christian, but the rest of her family followed traditional belief systems and the Native American Church.

Mann's first language was Cheyenne and even after she started school in Hammon, an aunt came daily to give her after-school lessons in Cheyenne culture. After graduating from high school in 1950, Mann went on to study at the normal school at Southwestern State College in Weatherford, Oklahoma. In 1954, she earned her bachelor's degree in English and her parents gave her the Indian name "The Woman Who Comes to Offer Prayer". She married while working as a high school English teacher, Alfred Whiteman, who died in 1980, and had four children with him.

== Career ==
As an elected board member for the Tribal Council, she was one of the authors of the federal legislation which resulted in a $15 million judgment from the US government in favor of her tribe in 1967 as part of the settlements of the Indian Claims Commission. She advocated for the creation of Native American studies programs to develop not only self-awareness but to allow American Indians to be empowered with self-determination. She was the "founding president of the Cheyenne and Arapaho Tribal college".

In 1970, Whiteman completed her master's degree in English literature at Oklahoma State University and was hired as part of the faculty for ethnic studies created after the Third World Liberation Front strike at University of California, Berkeley. She helped develop the curricula for the first-degree program for ethnic studies in the United States, while at Berkeley. That same year, she joined with other Native American women in the founding of the National Indian Women's Action Corps, an empowerment organization. The organizing officers included Dorothy Lonewolf Miller, president; Grace Thorpe (Sac & Fox), vice president; Stella Leach (Colville-Oglala Lakota), 2nd vice president; Woesha Cloud North (Ho-Chunk), secretary; Whiteman, treasurer; and Jennie R. Joe (Navajo), sergeant-at-arms. After teaching for two years at UC Berkeley, in 1972, she was hired to direct the Native American Studies program at the University of Montana, in Missoula. She would be a key designer of the curricula and taught at the university for 28 years.

As a Danforth Fellow, Whiteman continued her education, earning a PhD in American Studies from the University of New Mexico in Albuquerque in 1982. That year, she was honored as Cheyenne Indian of the Year, for the American Indian Exposition. Between 1986 and 1987, she took a leave of absence from the University of Montana, teaching at Harvard University and serving in the Bureau of Indian Affairs' Indian Education Office. She was the first woman American Indian woman to hold the position of director of Indian education programs and was selected by Assistant Department of the Interior Secretary Ross Swimmer (Cherokee Nation). Whiteman was selected by the American Indian Heritage Foundation in Washington, D. C., as Indian Woman of the Year for 1987.

Whiteman married Jim Morton in 1988, but they divorced after a decade. In 1991, Morton stepped away from her duties as director of the Native Studies Program and was promoted to a professorship which would give her more time to focus on writing. That year, she was featured in Rolling Stone as one of the top ten professors in the United States. During her time at the University of Montana, she took eight sabbaticals and became a widely respected speaker nationally on the issue of Indian education. During one of those leaves in 1993 and 1994, she helped design a Native American Studies Program for Haskell Indian Nations University in Lawrence, Kansas.

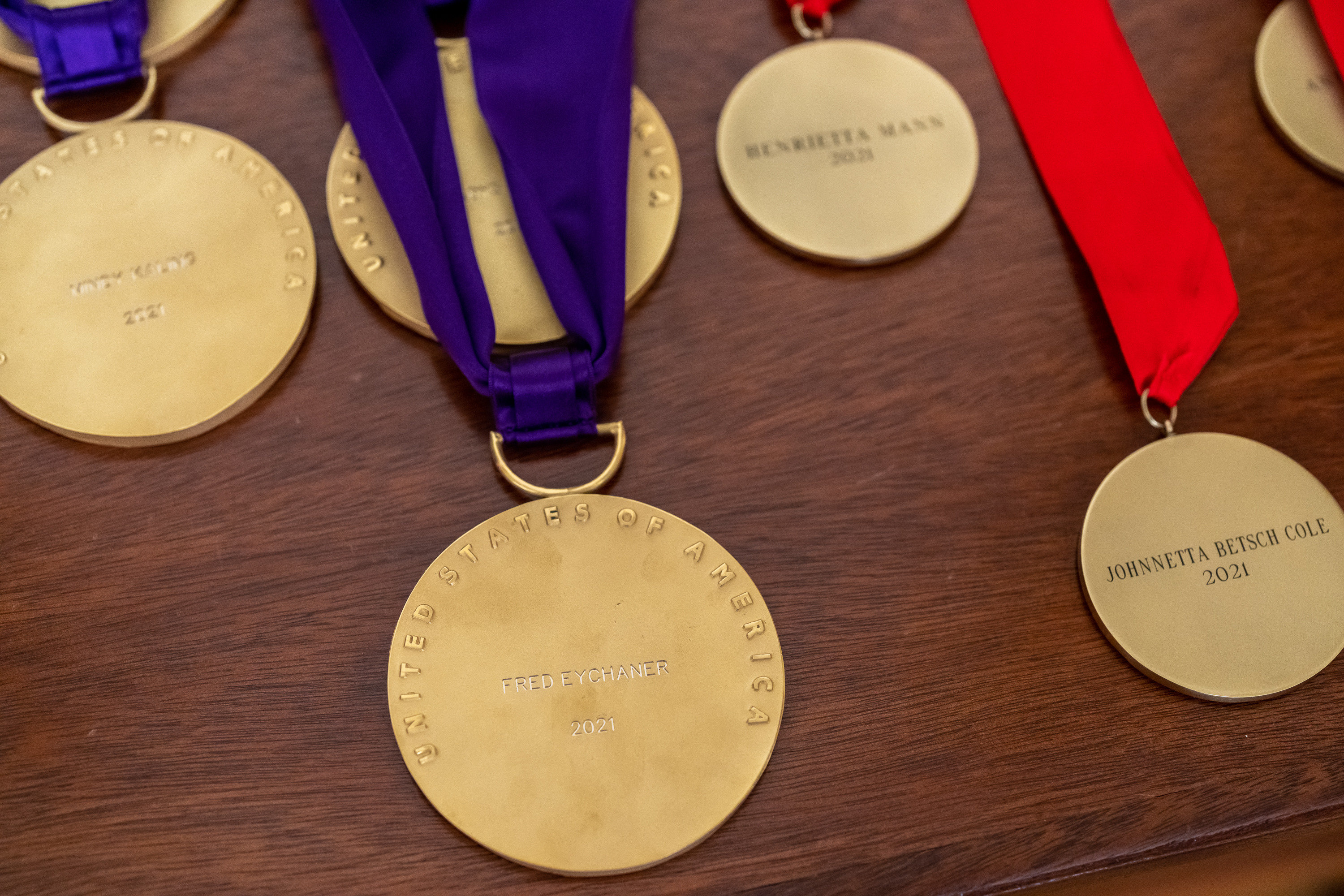
National Arts and Humanities Medal Ceremony Tuesday, March 21, 2023, in the East Room of the White House

Mann returned to using her maiden name around 1998. In 2000, she was selected to receive the Montana Governor's Humanities Award. In 2001, Mann moved to Montana State University (MSU) in Bozeman, to accept a position as the first person to occupy the endowed chair of Native American Studies at MSU. Retiring from teaching in 2003, Mann became a special advisor to the president of Montana State University. She served as one of the trustees who guided the Smithsonian's National Museum of the American Indian, which opened in 2004. In 2008, she was honored by the National Indian Education Association with a lifetime achievement award and in 2016, she became one of only two American Indians elected to the National Academy of Education. At age 89, Mann has received one of the nation’s highest honors — the National Humanities Medal — presented to her on March 21, 2023, by President Joe Biden. Mann is credited with strengthening and developing Native American studies in higher education.

== Selected works ==
- Whiteman, Henrietta (1973). Developing a Native American Studies Program (PDF). Denver, Colorado: National Teacher Corps. OCLC 967302318.
- Arviso-One Feather, Vivian; Whiteman, Henrietta (1985). American Indian and Alaska Native Career Development Youth Manual. Washington, D. C.: US Department of Agriculture, Extension Services and the Bureau of Indian Affairs/US Department of the Interior. OCLC 43002973.
- Mann, Henrietta (1997). Cheyenne-Arapaho Education, 1871-1982. Niwot, Colorado: University Press of Colorado. ISBN 0-87081-462-1.
- Mann, Henrietta; Phillips, Anita (2012). On This Spirit Walk: The Voices of Native American and Indigenous Peoples. Muskogee, Oklahoma: Abingdon Press. ISBN 978-1-4267-5841-6.
- Mann, Henrietta (2018). "Of This Red Earth". In Greymorning, Neyooxet (ed.). Being Indigenous: Perspectives on Activism, Culture, Language and Identity. Abingdon, Oxon: Routledge. pp. 102–112. ISBN 978-0-429-84671-7.
