= Richard Oakes =

Richard Oakes may refer to:

- Richard Oakes (activist) (1942–1972), Mohawk Native American leader of the 1969–71 occupation of Alcatraz Island
- Richard Oakes (guitarist) (born 1976), English musician and member of the band Suede
