= Renya =

Renya is a given name. Notable people and characters with the name include:

- Renya Mutaguchi (1888–1966), Japanese military officer
- Renya K. Ramirez (born 1959), Ho-Chunk American anthropologist, author, and Native feminist
- Renya Karasuma (烏丸 蓮耶), a mysterious character in Case Closed (Detective Conan)
