= LaNada War Jack =

Bannock activist and educator

- Born: LaNada Vernae Boyer; 1947 (age 78–79); Fort Hall Indian Reservation, Bingham County, Idaho, US
- Other names: LaNada Means, LaNada James, LaNada Boyer
- Years active: 1968–present

LaNada War Jack (born LaNada Vernae Boyer, 1947), also known as LaNada Boyer and LaNada Means, is an American writer and activist. She was one of the first Native American students admitted to the University of California at Berkeley in 1968. She led the drive to create the Native American Student Organization and became its chair. As a leader of the Third World Strike at UC Berkeley in 1969, she was arrested but succeeded in obtaining approval for the first ethnic studies courses to be included in the university's curricula. A few months later, she became one of the organizers of the Occupation of Alcatraz in 1969. After the occupation, she completed her bachelor's degree at the University of California, Berkeley and went on to study law at Antioch School of Law in Washington, D.C. While in Washington, she participated in the takeover of the Bureau of Indian Affairs office in 1972.

Returning to Idaho in 1974, War Jack (then known as Boyer) was involved in tribal politics and served a two-year term on the Shoshone-Bannock Tribes of the Fort Hall Reservation of Idaho Tribal Council. In 1979, she moved to Nevada and operated a ranch near Wadsworth, gaining certification in permaculture from the Permaculture Institute at Tagari Garden Farm, near Sisters Creek, Tasmania. Along with her husband, Gus James, a Northern Paiute, she worked on preserving natural resources for American Indian use. When they divorced in the early 1990s, she returned to Idaho and earned a master's degree in public administration and a PhD in political science from Idaho State University. She served for three years as the executive director of the Shoshone Bannock Tribes. She has continued her activism on behalf of Native people and is a distinguished professor at Boise State University, teaching Native law and governance courses.

== Early life and education ==
LaNada Vernae Boyer was born in 1947 on the Fort Hall Indian Reservation in Bingham County, Idaho to Olive May (née Burns) and Edward Queep Boyer. Her mother was a veteran of World War II and had worked as a welder in the Vancouver shipyard before returning to the reservation to raise her family. On her maternal side, her grandparents were Edith (née Bartlett), a teacher descended from Teash Ocean, and John Burns, son of the Bannock chief, Tahgee. Her father had also served in the United States Navy in Vancouver and later became a council member and chair of the Shoshone-Bannock Tribes of the Fort Hall Reservation of Idaho during the termination period. He represented the tribe in their land claims, and testified before the U.S. Congress on civil rights, education, and water rights in the 1960s. In the 1970s, he founded the Shoshone-Bannock Legal Research Project to continue the cultural and civic protection of American Indians. He was descended from war chief Tah mon mah.

Boyer attended school on the reservation and in the American Indian boarding schools system. She was a good student but was frequently expelled and had to change schools because she spoke out about the institutional environment. "Children were beaten for speaking their native language, practicing their culture, and following their own religions". In 1965, because there were no jobs on the reservation, Boyer moved to San Francisco, through the U.S. government relocation program. She married Theodore L. Means, a relative of Russell Means. The couple had two children but divorced in 1967. In January 1968, she enrolled at the University of California at Berkeley, becoming the first Native American student admitted to the institution. Active in student politics, she led the drive to create the campus Native American Student Organization and became its chair.

== Student activism (1969–1973) ==
In January 1969, Means became involved in the Third World Strike, which demanded that the university included histories of communities of color in their curricula to be taught by people of color. It united students from the Afro-American Students Union, the Asian American Political Alliance, the Mexican-American Student Confederation, and the Native American Student Organization. Means was among the students arrested during the protests and suspended for her leadership of the demonstrations, along with Manuel Ruben Delgado and Ysidro Macias. In the 1960s, it was rare for political movements to have women in leadership positions and supporting Means in her authority to lead became a symbol for indigenous feminism. Within three months, the strikes were successful in securing an agreement for launching the first ethnic studies department in the United States at UC Berkeley.

Since the 1969 Occupation of Alcatraz, the island had been a powerful symbol to urban Indians in the San Francisco Bay Area. In 1969, the San Francisco Board of Supervisors granted Lamar Hunt preliminary approval for the commercial development of Alcatraz. Shortly after, in October, the San Francisco Indian Center, the primary meeting place and administrative center for social services for the Bay Area's urban Indians burned. The United Council of the Bay Area proposed Alcatraz as a replacement facility and began plans to take over the island. On November 9, 1969, Means and Richard Oakes led 12 other students to occupy Alcatraz Island overnight. Lacking food and shelter, they left the following day.

Distancing herself from "so called Indian leaders" who were distrusted because of their age and social status in mainstream society, Means urged the student activists to plan a return to the island when John Folster, Adam Fortunate Eagle, and George Woodward were out of town. The students chose November 20, because the leadership were scheduled to be away at a national Indian educational conference. Means, one of the few who remained on the island for the 19-month occupation, brought her 2-year-old son, Deynon and on Sundays would leave to check on her apartment and communicate with her professors. Consciously choosing to bring their families, activists hoped to convey the generational and inter-tribal nature of their quest for indigenous rights. She wrote the grant proposal for $300,000 seeking to create a cultural and university facility on Alcatraz and served in a leadership role throughout the occupation, traveling throughout the United States and speaking to raise support for their cause. She became friends with Jane Fonda, who assisted her in obtaining engagements and television appearances. The Occupation of Alcatraz became a symbol of the struggle of indigenous people to re-establish their identity and led to over 50 other occupations of government facilities.

When the occupation ended, Means completed her education in 1971, graduating with honors in Native American Law & Politics. One of the founding members of the Native American Rights Fund, she served on its executive board for a decade. She relocated to Washington D.C. and enrolled in law school at the Antioch School of Law. In November 1972, she took part (as LaNada Boyer) in the occupation of the offices of the Bureau of Indian Affairs. The activists remained in the building for a week seeking to raise awareness of government failures in providing for American Indians and in treaty violations.

== Politics (1976–1990) ==
Boyer returned to the reservation, and in 1974, ran for a seat on the Shoshone-Bannock Tribal Council. In 1976, she ran again, and was successful in obtaining a seat on the Tribal Council, serving a two-year term. During her time on the council, the tribe was in a dispute with the Power County Board of Commissioners over zoning rights, hunting and fishing rights, and representation for non-Native residents on the tribal council. Boyer's position was that the reservation was created for tribal members and should remain within the purview of tribal law.

In 1979, Boyer married Alvin Ray "Gus" James, a Paiute involved in the Pyramid Lake Indian Reservation resource rights litigation with the federal government. By the early 1980s, James was living in Nevada and operating a ranch near Wadsworth, where they engaged in permaculture for their organic garden. She earned a Certificate in Permaculture Design in 1985 from the Permaculture Institute at Tagari Garden Farm, near Sisters Creek, Tasmania. She had two more children and assisted Gus in pressing the water rights case regarding the Truckee River. She also served on the Ad Hoc Committee to Protect Indian Water Rights and represented the organization in public meetings regarding proposed legislation. In 1986 the couple circulated a successful petition to reject a proposed bill to compensate the tribe for water use, but which did not contain provisions for adequate lake levels for spawning fish. That year, James also ran on the Democratic ticket for the Nevada Assembly as a representative for District 34 but was defeated.

== Later career (1990–present) ==
James divorced and returned to Idaho. She enrolled in a master's program at Idaho State University, earning her degree in public administration. In 1997, she worked as a congressional fellow in Washington, D.C. Continuing her studies, she graduated with a PhD in political science in 1999, becoming the first member of her tribe to earn a doctorate. James began using her tribal name LaNada War Jack, and served three years as executive director of the Shoshone Bannock Tribes. In 2002, War Jack attended the Land Retention Summit in Epes, Alabama, which allowed advocates and activists to share their stories and advice on retaining and managing their lands. She founded a non-profit organization, the Atzlana Foundation, to focus on protecting indigenous rights to air, land, fishing, and water. War Jack has continued her activism and was involved in the Standing Rock protest of 2016, the 50th anniversary celebrations of the Alcatraz Occupation, and protests against the celebration of Columbus Day. In addition to speaking widely on Native rights issues, she has taught Native American History at Creighton University and lectured at her alma mater, UC Berkeley. She is a distinguished professor at Boise State University and teaches Native law and governance courses.

== Works ==
- War Jack, LaNada (2009). "Reflections of Alcatraz". In Lincoln, Kenneth (ed.). Gathering Native Scholars: UCLA's Forty Years of American Indian Culture and Research. Los Angeles, California: UCLA American Indian Studies Center. ISBN 978-0-935626-61-2.
- War Jack, LaNada (October 2019). "Native Americans and the Third World Strike at UC Berkeley". Ethnic Studies Review. 42 (2). Tempe, Arizona: National Association for Ethnic Studies: 32–39. doi:10.1525/esr.2019.42.2.32. OCLC 8629669194.
- War Jack, LaNada (2019). Native Resistance: An Intergenerational Fight for Survival and Life. Brookfield, Missouri: Donning Company Publishers. ISBN 978-1-57864-875-7.

== See also ==
- List of Native American politicians
- Native American women in politics
