= Belva Cottier =

Sioux activist and social worker

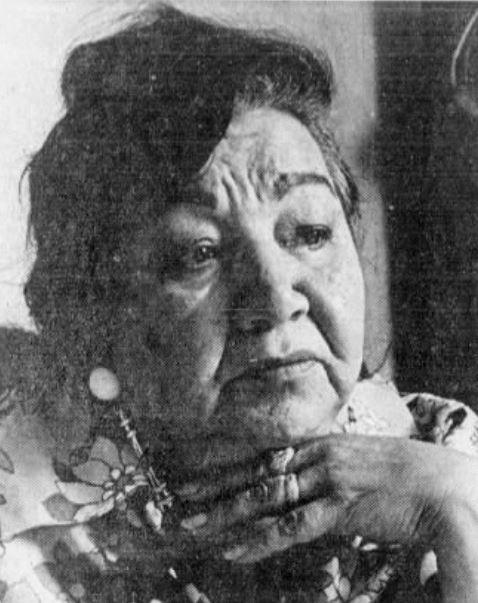
- Cottier, 1975
- Born: Belva Dale McKenzie; June 27, 1920; Todd County, South Dakota, US
- Died: May 2, 2000 (aged 79); Livermore, California, US
- Other name: Belva Cottier-Satterfield
- Occupations: Activist, social services administrator
- Years active: 1940s–1980s
- Children: 3

Belva Cottier (June 27, 1920 – May 2, 2000) was an American Rosebud Sioux activist and social worker. She proposed the idea of occupying Alcatraz Island in 1964 and was one of the activists who led the protest for return of the island to Native Americans. She planned the first Occupation of Alcatraz, and the suit to claim the property for the Sioux. Concerned for the health of urban Indians, she conducted a study for the Department of Health, Education and Welfare, which resulted in her becoming the executive director of the first American Indian Health Center in the Bay area in 1972.

== Early life and education ==
Belva Dale McKenzie was born on June 27, 1920, on the Rosebud Indian Reservation, in Todd County, South Dakota to Virginia B. (née Barker) and Narcisse McKenzie. Her mother was an enrolled member of the Santee Sioux from Nebraska. Her maternal grandfather, Alfred Barker, was a minister, married to Elizabeth (née Messer). Her father was Lakota and enrolled as a Rosebud Sioux. He died when McKenzie was five years old and after his death, she and her mother lived on various reservations. Her mother worked as a cook at the Cheyenne Agency Boarding School and at Fort Washakie, in Wyoming, later marrying Carl Sneve. McKenzie attended boarding school in Pierre, South Dakota and then attended public school, before graduating from Pine Ridge Boarding School After her graduation, in 1941, McKenzie married Allen Louis Cottier, an Oglala Sioux from the Pine Ridge Indian Reservation.

== Career ==
Cottier's husband joined the Navy during World War II, and Cottier relocated from South Dakota to Alameda County, California in 1943 with her mother and two daughters. They would later have another daughter. After the passage of the Indian Relocation Act of 1956, Cottier became involved in various programs to improve the lives of urban American Indians and served as secretary of the Sioux Club of the Bay Area. In 1963, when the government announced it was closing the Alcatraz Federal Penitentiary and returning Alcatraz Island to the City of San Francisco, Cottier suggested to her husband that they claim the island based on provisions in the 1868 Treaty of Fort Laramie. Believing that the treaty provided for lands which had formerly belonged to the Sioux to return to the Sioux if they became surplus property, Cottier and her cousin, Richard McKenzie, began a search for a copy of the treaty. Locating a copy in the Bancroft Library, they contacted attorney Elliott Leighton, who studied it with a team of six researchers for a month and a half. Leighton concluded that the treaty allowed non-reservation Sioux to file settlement claims for unspecified-use government lands.

Deciding that Sioux tribal members could claim the island, Allen Cottier, president of the local chapter of the National American Indian Council, led a group of five Sioux men including Richard McKenzie, Martin Martinez, Walter Means, and Garfield Spotted Elk, to stake homestead claims on the island on March 4, 1964. They were accompanied by about 35 other people, including Belva Cottier, and brought food sufficient to last 30 days. After pounding in wooden stakes and calling out their allotment number, each man completed a claim form and gave it to Leighton, who was to mail them to the Bureau of Land Management the following day. Two hours later, the acting warden, Richard J. Willard arrived, and threatened the group with felony charges for trespass. Advised by their lawyer to retreat, the group left after having occupied the island for four hours.

Three weeks later, Cottier led the effort to lay claim to the island through the courts. On March 27, McKenzie and other Sioux leaders, filed a legal action to obtain title to the island. In their petition, they asked the government to grant them the property for the purpose of founding a Native American university. The court ruled against them citing a 1934 action by Congress which had revoked permission for Native Americans to claim unused government land. While the government recognized the separate provisions of the 1868 Sioux treaty, the interpretation was that the Sioux had never owned Alcatraz, thus it could not be restored to them. When the government denied the petition, the property was awarded to the General Services Administration, but Cottier's efforts were remembered and served as a catalyst for the 1969 Occupation of Alcatraz.

In 1967, Cottier was hired as a volunteer counselor at the Oakland American Indian Association. Her position was initially undefined, but her duties included providing social services and driving Native Americans to appointments. In 1969, she divorced and began working as a paid employee for the Indian Association. That year, she also met with Richard Oakes and advised him and other students as they drafted a plan for a second occupation of Alcatraz.

In 1970, the Urban Indian Health Board was founded to address health needs of Native Americans in the San Francisco Bay area. The Department of Health, Education and Welfare granted funds to evaluate indigenous health needs and Cottier conducted a survey of families in Alameda, Santa Clara and San Francisco counties. The study became the basis for establishing a Native American Health Center in San Francisco in 1972 with Cottier serving as its executive director. While predominantly serving the American Indian population in the Bay area, the center was not restricted to Native American patients nor in its service area. During the Wounded Knee Occupation, Cottier collected donations and supplies, ensuring their safe delivery to the Pine Ridge Indian Reservation.

Cottier was involved in organizing a conference in 1972 to unite the discussions of needs and the national quest for equality among urban Indians, as well as those living on reservations. The Urban Indian Council which was formed during the conference was opposed by Russell Means and members of the American Indian Movement, but Cottier pressed for a less radical approach to problem solving. She believed the biggest problems facing urban Indians were unemployment and their isolation and invisibility in large cities. In 1975, Cottier married James W Satterfield. She continued working at the Native American Health Center into the 1980s.

== Death and legacy ==
Cottier died at her home in Livermore, California on May 2, 2000, and was buried on May 9 at the Golden Gate National Cemetery in San Bruno, California. She is remembered for her activism on behalf of Native Americans.
