= Cutcha Risling Baldy =

Associate professor and department chair of Native American studies

Cutcha Risling Baldy is an American associate professor and department chair of Native American studies at Cal Poly Humboldt in Arcata, California. Risling Baldy focuses her research on Indigenous feminisms, California Indians, Environmental Justice, and Decolonization. Her most notable contribution to the study of Indigenous feminisms was her debut book in 2018, We Are Dancing for You: Native Feminisms and the Revitalization of Women's Coming-of-age Ceremonies. At the 2019 Native American Indigenous Studies Associate Conference, she was awarded “Best First Book in Native American and Indigenous Studies”. Risling Baldy is also a prominent proponent of the Land Back movement committed to restoring indigenous lands to tribal nations in the United States. Her expertise has been featured in interviews with National Public Radio and various podcasts including For the Wild and Indiginae.

== Education ==
Risling Baldy received her Ph.D. in Native American studies with an emphasis in feminist theory and research from the University of California, Davis. She also received her M.F.A in creative writing and literary research from San Diego State University, as well as her B.A. in psychology from Stanford University. Her great uncle, David Risling, founded the Native American Studies program at University of California, Davis. He is often referred to as the "father of Indian education".

== Personal life and other contributions ==
=== Native background ===
Cutcha Risling Baldy currently lives in Humboldt County with her daughter, stepson, husband, and dog, Buffy. She is an enrolled member of the Hoopa Valley Tribe in Northern California, as well as Yurok and Karuk. Her membership of the Hoopa Valley provided a personal account in her debut book of the revitalization of the tribe's women's coming-of-age ceremony, The Flower Dance, that had not been fully practiced for several decades until recently. The revitalization occurred as the women of the tribe began to recognize the importance of Native traditions, and bring to life what was only a memory at the time. The book uses a Native American feminism framework, and addresses the challenges and theories surrounding menstruation, gender, a young women's coming-of-age, and gender violence and inequality. Her book has become a significant contribution to the research and education of Native womanhood.

=== Other writing ===
Risling Baldy's passion for Native women's rights has shown through not only in her book, but in other literature as well. She has written an extensive number of journals, both fiction and non-fiction, as well as poetry. Her literature varies in topics, but most commonly comments on popular culture in relationship to Native appropriation, present day Native rights and their historical links, and the destruction and revitalization of the Hupa women's coming-of-age ceremony, The Flower Dance. She also has a blog where she talks about similar topics more informally, posts news updates relevant to the Hoopa Valley Tribe, Native Californian women, and environmental issues, and has links to lectures given by her and other relevant videos.

=== Native Women's Collective ===
Risling Baldy is also a co-founder and Executive Director of the Native Women's Collective, a nonprofit that functions to support the revitalization of Native American arts and culture. The Native Women's Collective believes in the advancement of Native culture through emerging and established artists and creative mediums, as they provide space and network for Native creatives to work. Through the program, Cutcha Risling Baldy has dedicated herself to the revitalization of Native public education, cultural workshops, exhibits, research, cultural preservation projects, and programs and technical assistance.

=== The Flower Dance ===
The Hupa women's coming-of-age ceremony can last for three, five, or ten days. The ceremony, called The Flower Dance, is a public celebration within the tribe that is held when a girl starts menstruating. There are specific practices and rituals in place that are important to the Hupa people because of the strong historical tradition. The Flower Dance was once a regularly held event, but the California Gold Rush in the mid-nineteenth century was the stem of its destruction. Native women were targeted in the California genocide through the invasion of their land by miners and missionaries that caused lasting trauma on the Hupa people. The dance became especially dangerous for the young women, as men from outside the tribe would take them and rape them, thinking it was justified since they were now “women.” Other means of destruction included putting Native children in boarding schools and agents sent by the government to teach that the dance was too “savage.” It was only in 2001 when Kayla, Risling Baldy's younger cousin, had the first public Flower Dance in many generations.

== Selected works ==
=== Books ===
- We are Dancing for You: Native Feminisms and the Revitalization of Women's Coming of Age Ceremonies, University of Washington Press (2018) ISBN 9780295743448

=== Journal articles ===
- Baldy, C. R. (2015). Coyote is not a metaphor: On decolonizing,(re) claiming and (re) naming “Coyote”. Decolonization: Indigeneity, Education & Society, 4(1).
- Baldy, C. R. (2013). Why we gather: traditional gathering in native Northwest California and the future of bio-cultural sovereignty. Ecological Processes, 2(1), 1-10.
- Baldy, C. R. (2016). The new Native intellectualism:# ElizabethCook-Lynn, social media movements, and the millennial Native American studies scholar. Wíčazo Ša Review, 31(1), 90-110.
- Risling Baldy, C. (2017). mini-k’iwh’e: n (For That Purpose—I Consider Things) (Re) writing and (Re) righting Indigenous Menstrual Practices to Intervene on Contemporary Menstrual Discourse and the Politics of Taboo. Cultural Studies↔ Critical Methodologies, 17(1), 21-29.
