= Adam Fortunate Eagle =

Native American activist (1929–2026)

- Born: Adam Waldemar Nordwall; July 18, 1929; Red Lake Indian Reservation, Red Lake, Minnesota, U.S.
- Died: May 11, 2026 (aged 96); Fallon, Nevada, U.S.

Adam Fortunate Eagle (born Adam Waldemar Nordwall; July 18, 1929 – May 11, 2026) was a Native American activist. A hereditary member of the Red Lake Band of Chippewa Indians, he was the principal organizer of the 1969–1971 Occupation of Alcatraz by "Indians of All Tribes".

== Early life ==
Born in the missionary section of the Red Lake Indian Reservation on July 18, 1929, Fortunate Eagle was the son of a Swedish man and an Ojibwe woman. When he was five, his father died, leaving his mother no choice but to send him and four other children away to boarding schools. He attended the Pipestone Indian School in Minnesota and the Haskell Institute in Kansas, where he took advantage of the time to improve many skills that would help him later in life as well as escape the Great Depression, famine, and disease that was running rampant on reservations at the time. There he met his future wife, the Shoshone Indian Bobbie.

== California years ==
After their marriage, the family moved to the San Francisco Bay Area in 1951. Fortunate Eagle worked as a licensed termite inspector and by the late 1960s owned his own company in San Leandro, the First American Termite Company. Although living a comfortable life, Fortunate Eagle felt that he and his family needed to learn more about who they were as Native Americans. He became more involved in local Indian affairs and became chairman of the United Bay Area Council of American Indian Affairs. It was at this time that he proposed the takeover of Alcatraz.

In 1968, at the Bay Area Italian-Americans' annual San Francisco reenactment of Columbus' landing in America, having successfully lobbied to have the Indians portrayed by genuine Indians rather than costumed Boy Scouts, Fortunate Eagle flicked the wig off Joe Cervetto, playing Columbus, with his ceremonial staff in a symbolic scalping.

After he donated an 18-foot totem pole to the city of Livermore in 1969, the city shortened it before installing it in a park, and Fortunate Eagle placed a curse on their sewer system until they restored the cut off section.

Fortunate Eagle began to plan publicity movement involving a boat ride around Alcatraz, and he met with Richard Oakes, a local student activist, at a Halloween party at Tim Findley's house in 1969. He proposed the date of November 9 during the day and Oakes agreed to get as many students as he could. Fortunate Eagle took care of providing transportation around the island during the day of November 9. However, on the date, none of the ships were there and the press were wary of the Indians all dressed up in their tribal wear. Fortunate Eagle found a captain who seemed interested in the events of the day and talked him into providing transportation. He agreed but said he would not dock on the island, to which Fortunate Eagle agreed. Once near shore, Oakes seized the moment and jumped overboard. Fortunate Eagle stayed behind and watched as Oakes and his band struggled to reach the shore, later having to be rescued by the Coast Guard. The captain returned to shore a little while later. Fortunate Eagle was satisfied with just having been around the island because the press took notice. Oakes and his fellow students were returned by the Coast Guard, and Fortunate Eagle asked if they were ok. On the day of the actual takeover and occupation, November 20, 1969, Fortunate Eagle was out of town, but on Thanksgiving when everyone was invited to the Island he came riding across the bay standing on the prow of a ship exactly like George Washington, being the only day he was ever on the island during the 19 month Occupation of Alcatraz. Although he never lived on the island, Fortunate Eagle helped from the shores and was able to assist those on the island and keep the press reporting on the occupation while at the same time bringing to light the plight of the Native Americans. Fortunate Eagle was still active in Native American affairs after the Alcatraz occupation. He served mostly as an unappointed liaison between the Bay Area Council and the press.

He later taught Native American studies at California State University, Hayward. In September 1973, on his way to the International Conference of World Futures, he descended from the plane in Rome in full tribal regalia and claimed the country "by right of discovery" in the manner Columbus had claimed America. Invited for an audience with Pope Paul VI, instead of kissing the papal ring, he offered his own ringed hand in return; the Pope grinned and clasped his hand.

Fortunate Eagle filed for bankruptcy and left the Bay Area in 1975 after his pest control business incurred fines for environmental code violations and underpayment of taxes.

== Writing and film ==
Fortunate Eagle wrote "The Alcatraz Proclamation to the Great White Father and his People", which states that the goal of the occupiers was to create a center for Native American studies, an American Indian spiritual center, an Indian center of ecology, and a great Indian training school. While the occupation of Alcatraz seemed a failure on the surface, the federal policy of termination of all tribes ended in 1971, and self-determination became the new policy. Many consider the Alcatraz occupation the beginning of the "Red Power" movement. His 2008 book Heart of the Rock is the story of that "invasion".

He performed the voice of Sitting Bull in the feature-length documentary Sitting Bull: A Stone in My Heart. He is also the subject of a feature-length documentary called Contrary Warrior: The Life and Times of Adam Fortunate Eagle and wrote a book on his experiences as an Indian boarding school titled Pipestone: My Life in An Indian Boarding School.

One of his last works, Scalping Columbus, is a compilation of his own anecdotes.

== Later life ==
Nordwall received his Indian name Fortunate Eagle from a Crow Indian when he was 42. He now lives on the Paiute-Shoshone Reservation, where his wife was born; he has built a roundhouse out of tires and other recycled materials. In the 1980s he won awards for his sculpture; he also makes ceremonial pipes and headdresses, and in 1987 was jailed and tried for selling eagle feathers. His criminal trial ended in a hung jury but he was found guilty and fined in a civil trial.

== Personal life and death ==
Fortunate Eagle died in Fallon, Nevada on May 11, 2026, at the age of 96. He was the father of poet nila northSun.

== Bibliography ==
- Alcatraz! Alcatraz! The Indian Occupation of 1969-1971 (1992)
- Heart of the Rock: The Indian Invasion of Alcatraz (2008)
- Pipestone: My Life in an Indian Boarding School (2010)
