= Occupation of Catalina Island =

Chicano protest in 1972

- Part of Chicano Movement
- Members of the Brown Berets in formation, 1972
- Date: August 30 – September 22, 1972 (23 days)
- Location: Catalina Island; 33°20′52″N 118°19′44″W
- Caused by: Violations of the Treaty of Guadalupe Hidalgo
- Goals: Awareness of oppression of Mexican Americans

Parties
United States: Los Angeles County Sheriff's Department	Brown Berets

Lead figures
Raymond Rydell	David Sanchez

Number
	26 (November 20, 1969)

The Occupation of Catalina Island (Spanish: Ocupación de la Isla Santa Catalina) began on August 30, 1972, when the Brown Berets, a Chicano-rights organization, occupied Catalina Island, off the coast of Los Angeles, for three weeks. The Berets, led by their "Prime Minister" David Sanchez, claimed the territory rightfully belonged to Mexico and demanded that its 42,000 acres of undeveloped land be developed into housing.

== Background ==
Sanchez was inspired by the Occupation of Alcatraz, which had occurred three years earlier. After reading the Treaty of Guadalupe Hidalgo, which was the peace settlement ending the Mexican American War of 1848, Sanchez found that neither Catalina Island nor the Channel Islands had been directly mentioned in the treaty, and thus rightfully belonged to Mexico. The Berets wanted to use the occupation to raise awareness to the fact that Mexican Americans had been systematically discriminated against and disenfranchised since the signing of the treaty.

== Occupation ==
On August 30, 1972, the local island paper, The Catalina Islander reported "a group of young Brown Berets were discovered encamped on the bluff above the Casino, on Santa Catalina Island Company property." The group, which consisted of 26 members of the Brown Berets, posted a large Mexican flag on the point above the Chimes Tower and called the spot "Campo Tecolote" (Camp Owl).

According to Sanchez, the group did not come to the island with many resources. He later stated, "I went over there with $800. That's all I had for the whole operation. We bought food and, you know, a lot of the Mexican American girls [from the island] came to our camp, they would bring us enchiladas and beans." A resident of Avalon, John Regalado, noted the negative reaction the group drew, later stating, "the locals began calling the occupiers the 'Brown Burritos' instead of the Brown Berets." The mayor of Avalon Ray Rydell, meanwhile, refused to involve law enforcement for several weeks, explaining that he believed if he had, the ACLU likely would have gotten involved.

=== Local reaction ===
The local reaction to the Brown Berets' presence largely fell along racial lines. Some local Mexican American families, who mostly worked as maids or in the service industry on Catalina, supported the group. Maria Lopez, a resident of Catalina at the time, told the Los Angeles Times that her mother and aunts made food for the group, and her father delivered it to the Berets' campsite. Lopez stated, "The Mexican people here, the Chicanos, welcomed them. But a lot of the gringos, they were afraid they were coming to take over."

White townspeople's reactions to the Berets was overwhelmingly negative. Mayor Rydell described the occupation as "an invasion" and compared the Berets to Nazis, writing, "in the real democratic community of Avalon, there are no hyphenated Americans – no Irish-Americans, no Norwegian-Americans, no Mexican Americans – just Americans ... Don't let these racist Brown Berets confuse you." In fact, the occupation upset the white townspeople so much, a mob formed to attack the Berets. According to The Catalina Islander coverage of the time, the "vigilante-type" mob assembled at the country club to "go up and pound" the Berets, but were convinced by Sheriff Jack Vaughn to stand down and allow law enforcement to deal with the situation.

== Ending ==
A little more than three weeks after the occupation's beginning, Sheriff Deputies from the Los Angeles County Sheriff's Department came to enforce an "illegal zoning ordinance" on September 22, 1972. The Brown Berets did not resist and were escorted off the island. A local anecdote asserts that the Berets chanted "Chicano Power" while departing, while the white townspeople sang "God Bless America." At their departure, Mayor Rydell wrote, "living in the same town with these soggy, chocolate soldiers for three weeks was not pleasant for anybody."

== Legacy ==
In 1978, six years after the occupation, the government of Mexico explicitly recognized U.S. sovereignty over Catalina and the Channel Islands in a maritime treaty between Mexico and the United States.

== See also ==
- Chicano Movement
