= Native American feminism =

Type of feminism

Native American feminism or Native feminism is, at its root, understanding how gender plays an important role in indigenous communities both historically and in modern-day. As well, Native American feminism deconstructs the racial and broader stereotypes of indigenous peoples, gender, sexuality, while also focusing on decolonization and breaking down the patriarchy and pro-capitalist ideology. As a branch of the broader Indigenous feminism, it similarly prioritizes decolonization, indigenous sovereignty, and the empowerment of indigenous women and girls in the context of Native American and First Nations cultural values and priorities, rather than white, mainstream ones. A central and urgent issue for Native feminists is the missing and murdered Indigenous women crisis.

== Overview ==
Native feminist Renya K. Ramirez writes:

[T]he word Native in the term "Native feminisms" [is used] in order to concentrate on our similar experiences as Native women all over the Americas. But whether one utilizes a tribal name, "indigenous," "Native," "First Nations" or another term, highlighting the heterogeneity is essential for appreciating the varied experiences Indigenous women experience. Indeed, similar to other women of color feminists, this diversity encourages individuals to argue for the development of multiple feminisms rather than a singular feminism.

Noting that "feminism is ultimately derived from white culture," Ramirez sees a goal of Native feminism as redefining and establishing the struggles of Native women within their own context, and not in relation to white feminism. In her view, Native feminism is intersectional, and relationships between race, ethnicity, gender, sexuality, class and nations in North America from colonialism onward are to be reexamined as a means of understanding and identifying feminist praxis.

Indigenous decolonization, as seen through the lens of Native American feminism, can involve the revitalization and reclamation of Indigenous matriarchal cultural traditions. Maile Arvin writes that during colonization white settlers imposed their heteropatriarchal practices onto Indigenous communities. Arvin states that Native American feminists are reinforcing matriarchal processes through education and activism.

Cultural baggage associated with the words "feminist" and "feminism" has led to some disagreement about what to call "Native feminism". Kate Shanley, an Assiniboine feminist, believes that most Native women see "feminism" as solely a white women's movement, and therefore do not want to be associated with the word. She goes on to say that feminism as a concept, however, by whatever name, has a special meaning to Native women, including the idea of promoting the continuity of tradition, and consequently, pursuing the recognition of Tribal sovereignty.

Tribal sovereignty is central to Indigenous feminism, as well a pivotal political concern in Indian country, with Native American self-determination considered foundational to both cultural and material survival. In Ramirez's view, in order to accomplish this, tribal sovereignty must be re-conceptualized from Native women's perspectives.

Crystal Echohawk writes:

Sovereignty is an active, living process within this knot of human, material and spiritual relationships bound together by mutual responsibilities and obligations. From that knot of relationships is born our histories, our identity, the traditional ways in which we govern ourselves, our beliefs, our relationship to the land, and how we feed, clothe, house and take care of our families, communities and Nations.

== Stereotypes and Misconceptions ==
Native American women continue to face racial and ethnic stereotypes that originated in colonialist discourse dating from the 15th century. Many misconceptions continue today that cause extreme harm to Indigenous women. For example, Native American women have long been sexualized and stereotyped as promiscuous.

The "Indian Princess" stereotype that appears in the mythologized story of Pocahontas is equally pernicious. Neegahnii Madeline Chakasim says, "The Indian Princess stereotype involves an Indigenous woman, usually the daughter of the strong, ruthless 'Indian Chief,' and portrays her as desirable, beautiful, and untouchable, by, mostly, White men. She is usually submissive, helps the settlers out, and falls in love with a White man instead of the man her father and/or tribe "picked" for her."

== Issues and Crises ==
Native American women have long faced oppression and violence. Following the passage of the Family Planning Services and Population Research Act of 1970, one in four Native American women were sterilized, many under coercion or duress — what Cheyenne tribal judge Marie Sanchez called a modern form of genocide.

Native American women face violence, both within and outside of their communities. The Indian Law Resource Center reports that more than 80% of American Indian and Alaska Native women have experienced violence, and more than 50% have experienced sexual violence; "on some reservations, Indigenous women are murdered at more than 10 times the national average." Indigenous women are vastly more likely to experience assault or stalking.

A core issue in Native American feminism is the missing and murdered Indigenous women (MMIW) crisis. The MMIW movement advocates for the end to the assault, abduction, and killing of Indigenous women. In 2016, there were 5,712 cases of missing Native women. Of those, only 116 of these cases were logged into the US Department of Justice's missing persons database. Through this awareness-raising movement, Native American feminists have amplified the cases in which Indigenous women have been attacked and murdered. A red hand painted over one's mouth has become the symbol of this movement to exemplify the violence and bloodshed from the violence against Indigenous women.

In Canada, pressure from victims' families and FNIM Indigenous communities led to the Canadian National Inquiry into Missing and Murdered Indigenous Women and Girls, from 2016-2019, which concluded that there is an ongoing genocide against Indigenous women in Canada.

Jennifer Brant and Dawn Memee Lavell-Harvard have written that MMIW issues are often overlooked by the media and policymakers because Indigenous women face systemic racial and gender oppression.

== Native Feminist Influence ==
Long before Western suffrage or feminist movements took hold, Indigenous communities had been practicing female power. Sally Roesch Wagner wrote"

The Six Nation Haudenosaunee Confederacy had, and still have today, a family/governmental structure based on female authority. Haudenosaunee women controlled the economy in their nations through their responsibilities for growing and distributing the food. They had the final authority over land transfers and decisions about engaging in war. Children came through the mother's line, not the father's, and if the parents separated, the children stayed with their mother, and if she died, with her clan family. Women controlled their own property and belongings, as did the children. Political power was shared equally among everyone in the Nation, with decisions made by consensus in this pure democracy, the oldest continuing one in the world.

That model inspired 19th century suffragists including Elizabeth Cady Stanton and Matilda Joslyn Gage, who wrote of the Iroquois Confederacy: ""Never was justice more perfect; never was civilization higher." Additionally, indigenous communities recognized the idea of more than two genders long before that concept became recognized in Western society.

Native feminism is also credited for amplifying environmental justice priorities within the feminist movement.

== Native American Feminists ==
Leanne Simpson: Mississauga Nishnaabeg activist, scholar, poet and author, including the book A Short History of the Blockade. She writes about topics such as decolonization and recognizing the gender violence that Indigenous women face. She has been involved in Native American feminist movements, such as Idle No More.

Audra Simpson: Mohawk scholar focused on issues of Indigenous recognition in politics. She is the author of Mohawk Interruptus: Political Life Across the Borders of Settler States, which explores how the Kahnawà:ke Mohawks fought to keep their sovereignty in response to the US and Canadian governments.

Chrystos: Menominee two-spirit poet-activist who writes about colonialism, genocide, and sexuality. They contributed multiple pieces referencing Indigenous oral tradition in the landmark feminist book, This Bridge Called My Back: Writings by Radical Women of Color.

Sarah Deer: Muscogee (Creek) lawyer and professor who advocates for Native American women that experienced violence. She has been credited with helping ensure the reauthorization of the 2013 Violence Against Women Act which allows for easier prosecution of non-Native assaulters.

Cutcha Risling Baldy: Native American scholar at Cal Poly Humboldt, co-founder of the Native Women's Collective and author of We Are Dancing for You: Native Feminisms and the Revitalization of Women's Coming of Age Ceremonies. Risling Baldy's research focuses on Indigenous feminisms, environmental justice, and decolonization.

== See also ==
- Native American women in politics
