= Renya K. Ramirez =

Ho-Chunk American anthropologist, author, and Native feminist

- Born: 1959 (age 66–67)
- Occupations: Academic, author, feminist
- Children: 3
- Parent: Woesha Cloud North (mother) Robert Carver North (father)
- Relatives: Elizabeth Bender Roe Cloud (grandmother); Henry Roe Cloud (grandfather); Chief Bender (great-uncle)

Academic background
- Education: Stanford Graduate School of Education (PhD)
- Thesis: Healing through grief: Native Americans re-imagining culture, community and citizenship in San Jose, California (1999)
- Doctoral advisor: Renato Rosaldo

Academic work
- Discipline: Anthropology
- Institutions: University of California, Santa Cruz

Renya Katarine Ramirez (born 1959) is a Ho-Chunk American anthropologist, author, and Native feminist. She is a professor of anthropology at University of California, Santa Cruz. Ramirez has written 2 books on Native American culture.

== Early life and education ==
Reyna K. Ramirez was born in 1959 to Woesha Cloud North and Robert Carver North. She has 3 sisters and a brother. She is the youngest granddaughter of prominent Native American leaders Elizabeth Bender Roe Cloud and Henry Roe Cloud. Ramirez is an enrolled member of the Winnebago Tribe of Nebraska. She completed a Ph.D. at Stanford Graduate School of Education in 1999. Her dissertation was titled, Healing through grief: Native Americans re-imagining, culture, community and citizenship in San Jose, California. Ramirez's doctoral advisor was Renato Rosaldo.

== Career ==
Ramirez is a professor of anthropology at University of California, Santa Cruz. She is a Native feminist scholar. Ramirez is the executive producer, co-producer, screenwriter, and co-director of the film, Standing in the Place of Fear: Legacy of Henry Roe Cloud.

== Personal life ==
Ramirez is married to Gil and has a daughter and 2 sons.

== Selected works ==
- Ramirez, Renya K. (2007). Native Hubs: Culture, Community, and Belonging in Silicon Valley and Beyond. Duke University Press. ISBN 978-0-8223-4030-0.
- Ramirez, Renya K. (2018). Standing Up to Colonial Power: The Lives of Henry Roe and Elizabeth Bender Cloud. University of Nebraska Press. ISBN 978-1-4962-1268-9.
