= Henry Roe Cloud =

Native American educator and Presbyterian minister

The Reverend Henry Roe Cloud
- Wo-Na-Xi-Lay-Hunka (Wonah'ilayhunka)
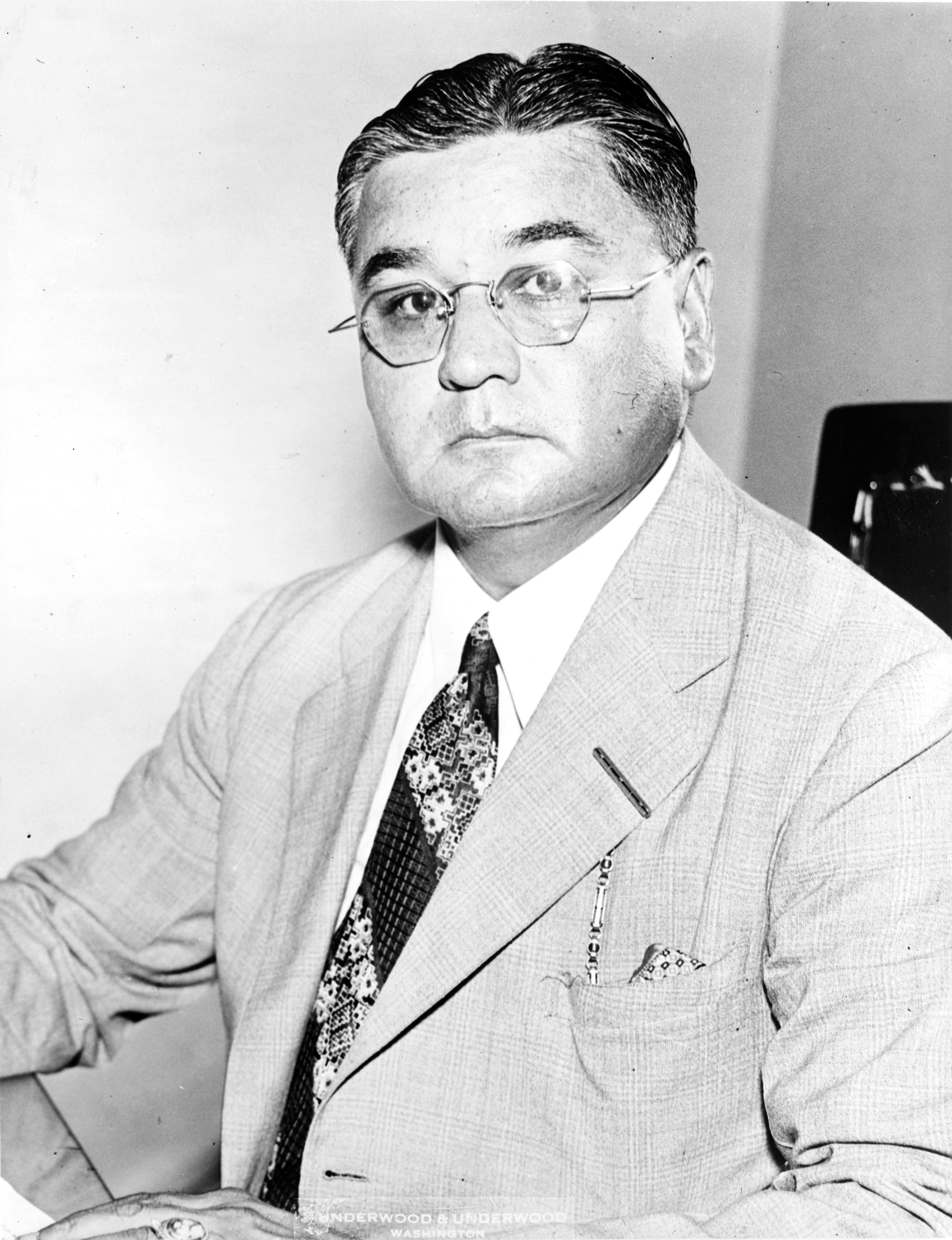
- Henry Roe Cloud in 1931
- Born: December 28, 1884; Winnebago Reservation
- Died: February 9, 1950 (aged 65); Siletz, Oregon
- Citizenship: American
- Education: Yale College (BA, MA); Auburn Theological Seminary (BD); Emporia College (DD)
- Occupations: Educator, college administrator, Office of Indian Affairs administrator, Presbyterian minister
- Organization(s): Haskell Institute, Brookings Institution, Office of Indian Affairs
- Spouse: Elizabeth Bender (m. 1916)
- Children: 6; including Woesha Cloud North
- Parent(s): Father: Na-Xi-Lay-Hunk-Kay or Nah'ilayhunkay (d. 1896); Mother: "Hard-To-See", (d. 1897)
- Relatives: Renya K. Ramirez (granddaughter)
- Awards: Indian Achievement Award (1935)

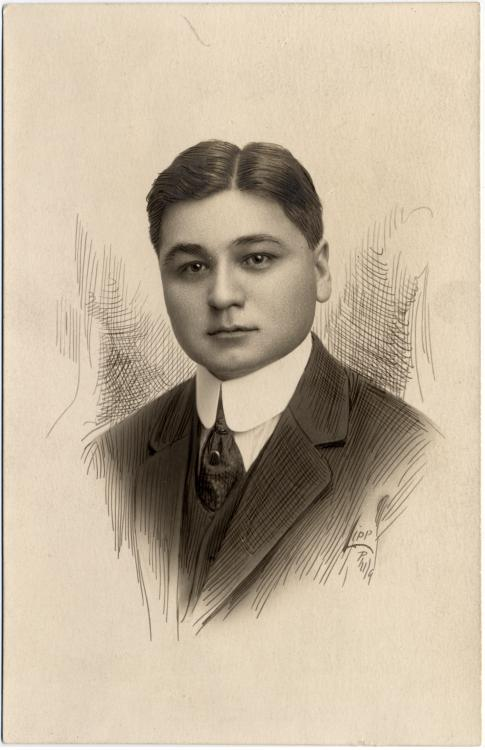
Henry Roe Cloud, about 1910

Henry Roe Cloud (December 28, 1884 – February 9, 1950) was a Ho-Chunk Native American, enrolled in the Winnebago Tribe of Nebraska, who served as an educator, college administrator, U.S. federal government official (in the Office of Indian Affairs), Presbyterian minister, and reformer.

== Early life ==
Henry Roe Cloud was born December 28, 1884, a member of the Bird Clan, on the Winnebago Reservation in northeastern Nebraska and was orphaned when his parents died in 1896 and 1897. After his education in a series of government schools, his intellectual ambition, academic performance, and personal qualities brought him in 1901 to the private Mount Hermon Preparatory School (now Northfield Mount Hermon School) in Massachusetts. He financed his education through the school's work-study program and was introduced to the social circles of America's ruling elite. He graduated a salutatorian in 1906 and the school served as his conduit into the Ivy League.

== College education ==
Cloud was the first full-blood Native American to attend Yale University. He graduated with a bachelor of arts (B.A.) in psychology and philosophy from Yale College in 1910 and earned a master of arts (M.A.) degree in anthropology from Yale University in 1914. He was a campus celebrity due to the force of his personality and speaking skills, and in an era when rhetoric was an art, he was especially accomplished, attracting large audiences on campus and in national venues. One measure of his prestige as an undergraduate was being tapped for the Yale senior society, Elihu.

Roe advocated for Indians to make a space for themselves in higher education both while still at Yale and shortly after. In 1914, he protested census figures of college attendance - noting that only a minute fraction of the Indian population was college bound. Shortly after, in the late 1920s Meriam Report, Roe Cloud voiced outrage at the under-education of Indians. Scholars such as Joel Pfister compare Roe Cloud's ideology on the education of Indian minorities to W.E.B. Dubois' theory of the "Talented Tenth" in African American culture. Roe Cloud helped organize efforts to form an Indian "Talented Tenth."

While an undergraduate, Cloud attended a lecture by the missionary, Mary Wickham Roe, a member of a prominent Yankee family involved in evangelical Christian mission work. He established a close relationship with her and her husband, Walter C. Roe. The couple adopted him, and he took their surname as his middle name.

From 1910-1911 he studied sociology at Oberlin College. He attended Auburn Theological Seminary in New York, where he earned a bachelor of divinity degree and was ordained as a Presbyterian minister in 1913. He returned to school and received a doctorate of divinity from Emporia College, Kansas in 1932.

== Career ==
In a dissertation by a Purdue University scholar, Cloud's significance is described "as a reformer, an educator, and Indian Service official. As a prominent Indian figure of the 1920s and 1930s, Cloud's life demonstrates how and to what extent Indians were able to influence federal Indian policy. His life also provides a window into the close ties between progressive ideas and the evangelical Protestant Christianity that prompted and guided many of the reform efforts in the first decades of the twentieth century. Cloud's work also shows him to be capable of moving beyond this Progressive Era paradigm of assimilation and embracing new currents of reform such as the push for cultural pluralism."

His career with the Office of Indian Affairs and the Brookings Institution focused on the efforts to establish modern schools for Native American youth. He became superintendent of the Haskell Institute, now known as Haskell Indian Nations University, in Lawrence, Kansas, in 1933. During his tenure, he began the transition of then Haskell Institute from one of:

"...militaristic assimilation to one of re-organization, and finally to the emergence of an Indigenous voice."

Cloud was directly involved in getting Congress to pass the Wheeler-Howard Act , known also as the Indian Reorganization Act of 1934, which began a reversal of prior assimilationist policies of the US government.

In 1947, he was appointed the Superintendent of the Umatilla Indian Reservation. "In 1948, he was appointed regional representative for the Grande Ronde and Siletz Indian Agencies in Oregon."

== Family ==
Henry Roe Cloud's wife, Elizabeth Bender Roe Cloud (1888-1965), spoke widely on American Indian affairs, and served on the Indian Welfare Committee for the General Federation of Women’s Clubs, and won the American Mother of the Year Award in 1950 for her work.

His granddaughter, Renya Ramirez, is an American Studies professor at the University of California, Santa Cruz.

== Death and legacy ==
Henry Roe Cloud died of a heart attack in Siletz, Oregon, on February 9, 1950. He was buried in Beaverton, Oregon. An entry on Cloud is included in the American National Biography, Vol 5 (1999) and his personal papers are housed as a distinct series in the "Roe Family Papers" in Sterling Memorial Library's Manuscripts and Archives collection at Yale University.

The majority of Cloud's papers, personal photographs, and documents (relating to Yale and the Mount Hermon school) and theological society parchments as well as papers from his work until his death in 1950 were in the care of Henry's Great Grandson, Shahn Roe Cloud Hughes in Portland, Oregon.

In November 2014, the items were donated to the Yale University Library, Manuscripts and Archives. They are part of the Ravi D Goel Collection on Henry Roe Cloud. Collection highlights include Cloud's candid thoughts on many Indian tribes, leading figures and the state of US-Indian affairs. Almost all of the letters were addressed to his daughter Marion Roe Cloud Hughes. A detailed April 1937 letter addresses Cloud's views on the Crees, Joseph Dussome, Baptiste Samatt, and Rocky Boy Superintendent Earl Wooldridge. In a February 14, 1938 letter, Cloud writes about a reunion with his Yale 1910 classmate and then Chinese Ambassador to the United States Wang Zhengting. (See also Yale Manuscripts and Archives April 2015 blog, "Party Diplomacy: The Ravi D. Goel Collection on Henry Roe Cloud.") In a January 12, 1939 letter, he writes of the opportunity to see his Yale classmate and US Senator Robert Taft on his upcoming visit to Washington, DC.

The Henry Roe Cloud conference was held at Yale in 2010, "celebrating 100 years of Native American education." Since 2010, Yale has offered an annual fellowship position, the Henry Roe Cloud Dissertation Writing Fellowship in American Indian and Indigenous Studies.

Yale University Press publishes a series of books, The Henry Roe Cloud Series on American Indians and Modernity.
