= American College Health Association =

Organization of college health professionals

- Abbreviation: ACHA
- Formation: 1920
- Type: Professional association
- Legal status: Non-profit
- Purpose: Advocacy, Education, and Research
- Headquarters: Silver Spring, Maryland
- Members: >800 higher education institutions (2019)
- Chief Executive Officer: Devin Jopp
- Board of directors: 18 members (listed here)
- Affiliations: 11 regional affiliates in 6 regions of the United States (listed here)
- Website: acha.org
- Formerly called: American Student Health Association

The American College Health Association (ACHA) is a Silver Spring, Maryland-based organization of college health professionals throughout the United States. It was founded in 1920 as the American Student Health Association (ASHA), obtaining its current name in 1948. Over 800 higher education institutions are members of the ACHA, as of 2019. The association also has over 2,800 individual health care professionals as members. Since 1958, the association's official journal has been the Journal of American College Health, which was founded in 1958 as Student Medicine.
