= Journal of American College Health =

- Discipline: College health
- Language: English
- Edited by: Teri Aronowitz, John A. Vaughn, Adam E. Barry

Publication details
- Former name(s): Journal of the American College Health Association
- History: 1952-present
- Publisher: Routledge on behalf of the American College Health Association
- Frequency: Bimonthly
- Impact factor: 2.395 (2021)

Standard abbreviations
- ISO 4: J. Am. Coll. Health

Indexing
- ISSN: 0744-8481 (print); 1940-3208 (web)
- OCLC no.: 181819626

Links
- Journal homepage; Online access; Online archive

The Journal of American College Health is a bimonthly peer-reviewed public health journal covering college health. It was established in 1952 as the Journal of the American College Health Association, and obtained its current name in 1982. It is published by Routledge in cooperation with the American College Health Association. The editors-in-chief are Teri Aronowitz (University of Massachusetts Boston), John A. Vaughn (Duke University), and Adam E. Barry (Texas A&M University). According to the Journal Citation Reports, the journal has a 2020 impact factor of 3.087.
