= Occupation of Alcatraz =

1969–1971 American Indian occupation of Alcatraz

- Part of Red Power movement and political activism in the United States
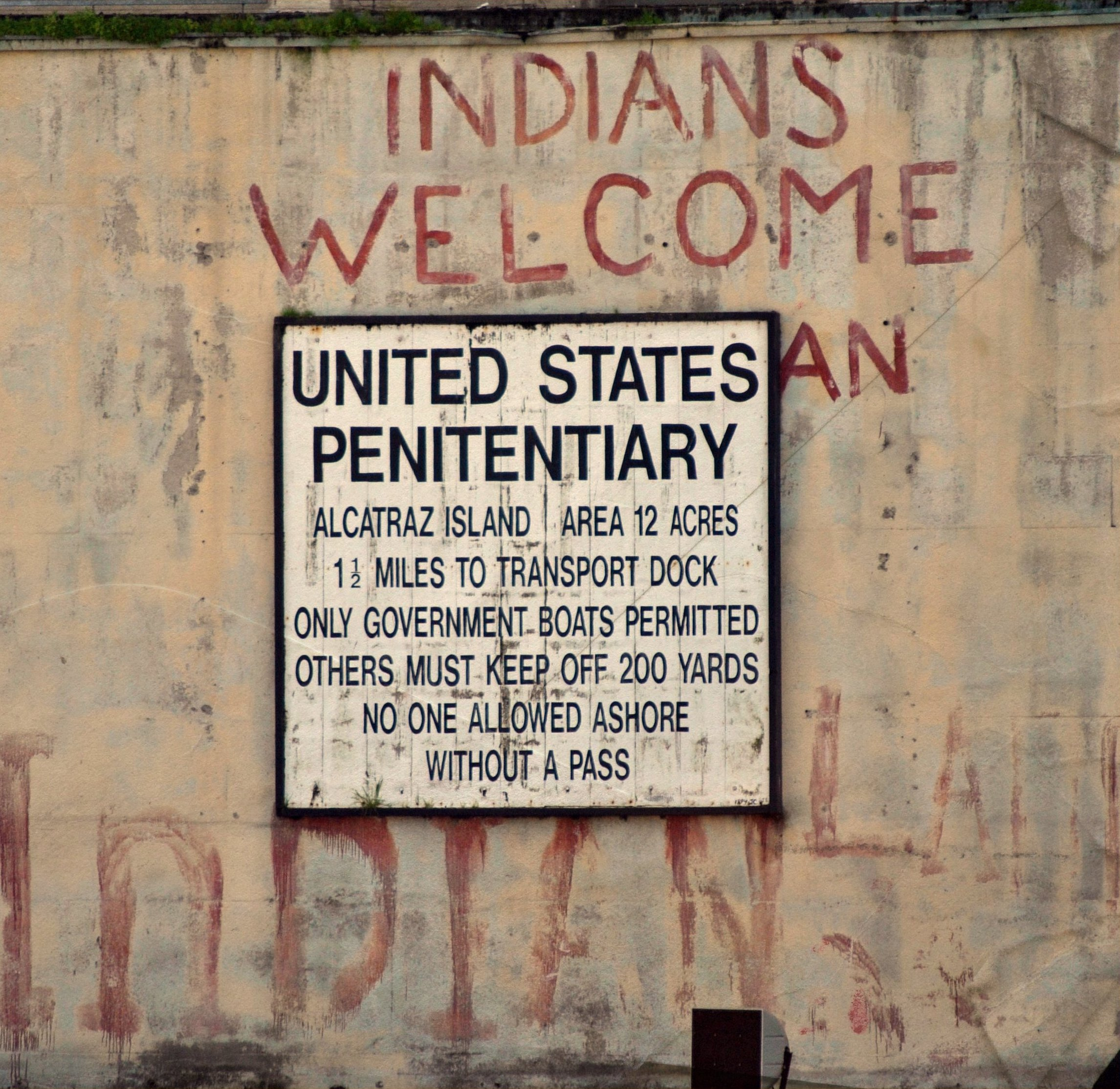
- Markings from the occupation of Alcatraz as it appeared in 2010
- Date: November 20, 1969 – June 11, 1971 (1 year, 6 months and 22 days)
- Location: Alcatraz Island; 37°49′36″N 122°25′22″W
- Caused by: Violations of the Treaty of Fort Laramie
- Goals: Awareness of American Indian oppression

Parties
United States; U.S. Coast Guard; GSA; FBI; U.S. Marshals	"Indians of All Tribes"; Supported by: International Longshore and Warehouse Union

Lead figures
Leonard Garment; Bradley H. Patterson Jr.	Richard Oakes (St. Regis Mohawk); John Trudell (Santee Dakota); LaNada Means (Fort Hall Shoshone-Bannock)

Number
	89 (November 20, 1969); Hundreds (at peak); 15 (June 11, 1971)

Casualties
- Deaths: One (accidental)

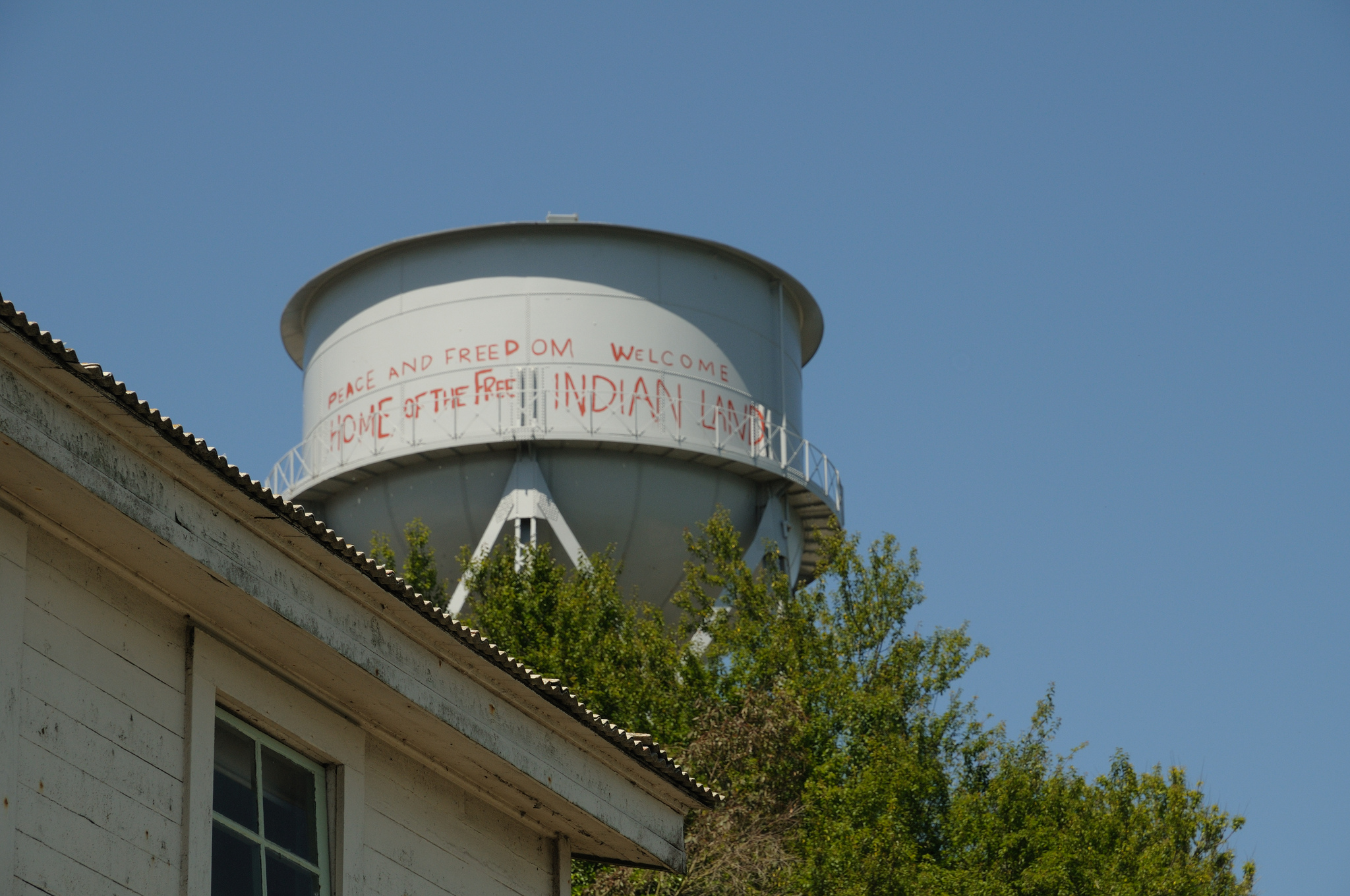
Graffiti on the water tower

The Occupation of Alcatraz (November 20, 1969 – June 11, 1971) was a 19-month long occupation of Alcatraz Island and its prison complex, then classified as abandoned surplus federal land, by 89 American Indians and their supporters. The occupation was led by Richard Oakes, LaNada Means, and others, while John Trudell served as spokesman. The group lived on the island together until the occupation was forcibly ended by the U.S. government.

The protest group chose the name Indians of All Tribes (IAT) for themselves. IAT claimed that, under the Treaty of Fort Laramie (1868) between the U.S. and the Lakota tribe, all retired, abandoned, or out-of-use federal land was to be returned to the Indigenous peoples who once occupied it. As Alcatraz penitentiary had been closed on March 21, 1963, and the island had been declared surplus federal property in 1964, a number of Red Power activists felt that the island qualified for a reclamation by American Indians.

The Occupation of Alcatraz had a brief effect on federal Indian Termination policies and established a precedent for American Indian activism. Oakes was later shot to death in 1972. The American Indian Movement was targeted by the federal government and FBI in COINTELPRO and similar surveillance operations.

== Background ==
In 1963, Belva Cottier (Rosebud Lakota), a social worker living in the San Francisco Bay Area, read an article that the Alcatraz Federal Penitentiary was to be closed and the property given to the City of San Francisco. Remembering the 1868 Treaty of Fort Laramie, she and her cousin, Richard McKenzie (Rosebud Lakota), located a copy of the treaty and proposed that if the property was surplus land of the government, Sioux could claim it. She planned and organized an occupation and a court action to obtain title to the island. On March 8, 1964, a small group of Lakota demonstrated by occupying the island for four hours. The entire party consisted of about 40 people, including photographers, reporters and Elliot Leighton, the lawyer representing those claiming land stakes. According to Adam Fortunate Eagle, this demonstration was an extension of already prevalent Bay Area street theater used to raise awareness. The Lakota activists were led by Richard McKenzie, Martin Leo Martinez, Garfield Spotted Elk, Virgil Standing-Elk, Walter Means, and Allen Cottier. Cottier acted as spokesman for the demonstration, stating that it was "peaceful and in accordance with Sioux treaty rights". The protesters were publicly offering the federal government the same amount for the land that the government had initially offered them; at 47 cents per acre, this amounted to $9.40 for the entire rocky island (equivalent to $97.58 in 2025), or $5.64 for the 12 usable acres. Cottier also stated that the federal government would be allowed to maintain use of the Coast Guard lighthouse located on the island. The protesters left under threat that they would be charged with felony. This incident resulted in increased media attention for Indigenous peoples' protests across the Bay Area.

The United Council of the Bay Area Indian community initially considered writing a proposal and filing an application for the use of Alcatraz by the Lakota people under the conditions of their treaty. Plans were drawn up for using the buildings on Alcatraz as a cultural center. Conversations about handing Alcatraz over to developers for commercial development created concern about the future availability of the island. A desire for more immediate action to claim space for the local Indian community was finally spurred by the loss of the San Francisco Indian Center to fire on October 10, 1969. The loss of the San Francisco Indian Center spurred action among Indigenous peoples because of the importance it held within their community. The center provided Native Americans with jobs, health care, aid in legal affairs, and social opportunities. This detrimental loss, happening on top of the Indians' already growing tension with the U.S. government, prompted strategies for obtaining Alcatraz for use by the local Indian community shifted from formal applications to more immediate takeover.

In 1969, Adam Nordwall (Adam Fortunate Eagle, Red Lake Chippewa) planned a symbolic boat ride for November 9, during the daylight hours, to ride around Alcatraz to gain the attention of local news outlets. University student leaders Richard Oakes (St. Regis Mohawk) and LaNada Means (Fort Hall Shoshone-Bannock), head of the Native American Student Organization at the University of California–Berkeley, with a larger group of student activists joined Nordwall. A group of five boats was organized to take approximately 75 Indigenous peoples over to the island, but none of the boats showed up. Adam Fortunate Eagle convinced Ronald Craig, the owner of the Monte Cristo, a three-masted yacht, to pass by the island when their own boats did not arrive. Oakes, Jim Vaughn (Cherokee), Joe Bill (Hooper Bay Yup'ik), Ross Harden (Ho-Chunk) and Jerry Hatch jumped overboard, attempting to swim to shore, and claim the island by right of discovery.

The Coast Guard quickly rescued the men, ending their attempts. LaNada Means, dissatisfied with the outcome of the day, hired a fishing boat paid by Earl Livermore (director of New American Indian Center in San Francisco, after the Old American Indian Center burned), making their way to the island again, and fourteen stayed overnight. The 14 occupiers, led by Means and Oakes, included Kay Many Horses (Lakota), John Vigil (Pueblo), and John Whitefox (Sac and Fox), from the San Francisco Indian Center; Joe Bill (Yup'ik), Ross Harden (Winnebago), Fred Shelton (Alaska Native), and Ricky Evening (Shoshone-Bannock), from San Francisco State University; and Linda Aranaydo (Muscogee), Burnell Blindman (Lakota), David Leach (Colville/Lakota), John Martell (Cherokee), and Jim Vaughn (Cherokee), from the University of California, Berkeley. The plan for that night's takeover was to split into groups; that way if the coast guard found one group there would still be others there to continue the righteous fight. The following day, November 10, Oakes surprised the student occupiers, by delivering a proclamation, written by Fortunate Eagle, to the General Services Administration (GSA) which claimed the island by right of discovery, after which the groups were removed. The Native American Students felt betrayed by Oakes who gave them up to the Coast Guard. Having no knowledge of a proclamation that gave up the Native American student occupier groups in trade for a proclamation to no effect. There were more students on the mainland who were going to join the 14 occupiers and bring out food and supplies on the day of the 10th, that were questioning why the 14 occupiers were returning.

The students distanced themselves from Adam Nordwall, Lehman Brightman who wanted to manipulate the movement, as they distrusted their motives because of their social position in mainstream society. In the morning hours at pier 39 of Fisherman Wharf, November 10, 1969, LaNada Means decided upon the date of November 20 because Oakes had said that they would not go out to Alcatraz again giving them an element of surprise, and it would be a time when those elder men would be away at an educational conference. This decision by LaNada Means to choose November 20, 1969, began the successful 19-month occupation of Alcatraz opening up hearts and minds to Native American issues and struggles throughout the country, a forerunner of the Red Power movement and the Self Determination Era. Though recently many people have claimed that the American Indian Movement (AIM) was somehow involved in the Takeover, AIM had nothing to do with the planning and execution of the Occupation, though they did send a delegation to Alcatraz in the early months in order to find out how the operation was accomplished and how it was progressing.

== Occupation ==
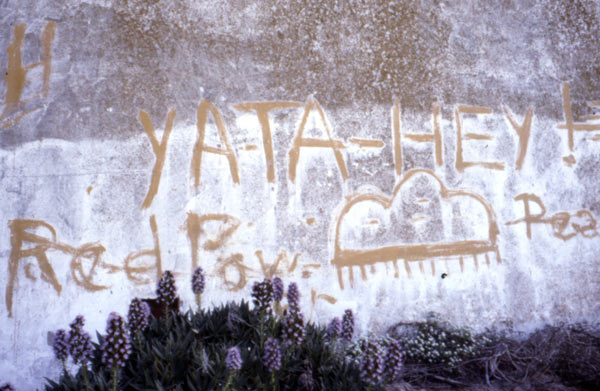
Markings from the occupation, featuring a Navajo greeting, "Yata Hey"

In the late evening hours of November 20, 1969, 89 American Indians, including more than 30 women, students, married couples and six children, set out from Palo Alto to occupy Alcatraz Island. A partially successful Coast Guard blockade prevented most of them from landing, but fourteen protesters landed on the island to begin their occupation. The island's lone guard, who had been warned of the impending occupation, sent out a message on his radio. "Mayday! Mayday!" he called. "The Indians have landed!"

On December 10, 1969, on Alcatraz, protesters, including Stella Leach and Earl Livermore, had a conference with government officials, led by Kim Robertson, San Francisco's regional GSA representative, with members of the Labor Department.

On December 24, 1969, Richard Oakes, Earl Livermore (Blackfeet), and Al Miller, held a press conference at Alcatraz Federal Penitentiary. The interview discussed the reasons for the occupation and as well described the structure of how the inhabitants lived in the island and their adaptions. Livermore as well discussed the Alcatraz Proclamation made and sent to the U.S. government which clarified their reasons to inhabit the island.

At the height of the occupation there were 400 people. Native women, like Aranaydo, Woesha Cloud North (Ho-Chunk/Ojibwe), and Vicky Santana (Blackfeet) ran the school with the help of Douglas Remington, (Ute) and teacher's aids Justine Moppin (Mono) and Rosalie Willie (Paiute). There was also a daycare and Stella Leach (Colville-Lakota) set up the health clinic. Jennie R. Joe (Navajo) and Dorothy Lonewolf Miller (Blackfeet descent), assisted Leach as nurses, and Robert Brennan, Richard Fine, and Leach's boss, David Tepper, volunteered as doctors. Native and non-native people brought food and other necessary items to the people on the island, but the coast guard's blockades made it increasingly difficult to supply the occupants with food. The suppliers, after stealthily journeying across the bay via canoe, dropped off the supplies which then had to be carried up steep ladders. Aranaydo and Luwana Quitiquit (Robinson Pomo) were responsible for running the kitchen and cooking for the occupants. The occupation lasted about 19 months but ended peacefully. An employee of the Bureau of Indian Affairs, Doris Purdy, who was also an amateur photographer, accompanied a group who went on November 29, stayed the night and recorded video footage.

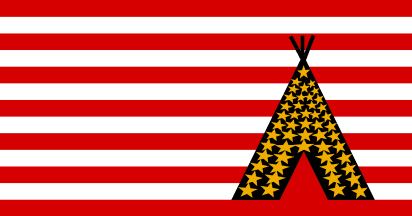
Flag that flew over Alcatraz, designed and prototyped by Lulie V. Nall, a Penobscot activist.

The protesters, predominantly students, drew inspiration and tactics from contemporary civil rights demonstrations, some of which they had themselves organized. Jerry Hatch and Al Miller, both present at the initial landing but unable to leave the boat in the confusion after the Coast Guard showed up, quickly turned up in a private boat. The first landing party was joined later by many others in the following days, including Joe Morris (a key player later as a representative of the Longshoreman's Union, which threatened to close both ports if the Occupiers were removed), and the man who would soon become "the Voice of Alcatraz", John Trudell. Although she would not receive the same recognition from mainstream media as Trudell and Oakes would, LaNada Means, who was one of the first to arrive and one of the last to leave, organized written statements and speeches that outlined the purpose of the occupation. Fellow activist Dean Chavers (Lumbee) said Means was "the real leader of the occupation". To the media and to the federal government, Means made it clear that the occupiers wanted complete Indian control over the island, under the Treaty of Fort Laramie, for the purpose of building a cultural center that included Native American Studies, an American Indian spiritual center, an ecology center, and an American Indian Museum. According to Means' grant proposal, the center would include full-time Indian consultants, Indian teachers, Indian librarians, and an Indian staff leading people around the center in order to tell the story of Indians of All Tribes. The occupiers specifically cited their treatment under the Indian termination policy and they accused the U.S. government of breaking numerous Indian treaties.

Richard Oakes sent a message to the San Francisco Department of the Interior:

We invite the United States to acknowledge the justice of our claim. The choice now lies with the leaders of the American government – to use violence upon us as before to remove us from our Great Spirit's land, or to institute a real change in its dealing with the American Indian. We do not fear your threat to charge us with crimes on our land. We and all other oppressed peoples would welcome spectacle of proof before the world of your title by genocide. Nevertheless, we seek peace.

President Richard Nixon's Special Counsel Leonard Garment took over negotiations from the GSA.

On Thanksgiving Day, hundreds of supporters made their way to Alcatraz to celebrate the Occupation. In December, one of the occupiers, John Trudell, began making daily radio broadcasts from the island, and in January 1970, occupiers began publishing a newsletter. Joseph Morris, a Blackfoot member of the local longshoreman's union, rented space on Pier 40 to facilitate the transportation of supplies and people to the island.

Cleo Waterman (Seneca Nation) was president of the American Indian Center during the takeover. As an elder, she chose to stay behind and work on logistics to support the occupiers. She worked closely with Grace Thorpe and the singer Kay Starr to bring attention to the occupation and its purpose.

Thorpe, daughter of Jim Thorpe (Sac and Fox), was one of the occupiers and helped convince celebrities like Jane Fonda, Anthony Quinn, Marlon Brando, Jonathan Winters, Buffy Sainte-Marie and Dick Gregory, to visit the island and show their support. Not only did Thorpe bring both national and international attention to the occupation, she also provided supplies necessary to keep the occupation alive. Thorpe supplied a generator, water barge and an ambulance service to the island. Rock band Creedence Clearwater Revival supported the Occupation with a $15,000 donation (equivalent to $124,357 in 2025) that was used to buy a boat, named the Clearwater, for reliable transport to Alcatraz. As a child, actor Benjamin Bratt was present at the occupation with his mother and his siblings.

== Outside support ==
During the occupation, cooperative coalitions were formed between AIM and other civil rights organizations, namely the Black Panthers and the Brown Berets, with both the Panthers and the Berets helping with security issues and in the delivery of food and other essential supplies to the island. In addition, at least 20 Asian Americans also joined in bringing supplies to the island during the occupation. And at least one contemporary article written in Gidra, a newspaper dedicated to the Asian American movement, documented multiple local community members' involvement in and support of the protest. American actress Jane Fonda is reported to have brought her own sleeping bag and later sent six generators and a rotor tiller to the island. American actor Marlon Brando is also said to have visited the island, further inspiring him to decline his Oscar for Best Actor at the 45th Academy Awards.

== Collapse and removal ==
On January 3, 1970, Yvonne Oakes, 13-year-old daughter of Annie and stepdaughter to Richard Oakes, fell to her death, prompting the Oakes family to leave the island, saying they did not have the heart for it anymore. Some of the original occupiers left to return to school, and some of the new occupiers had drug addictions. Some non-Indigenous members of San Francisco's drug and hippie scene also moved to the island, until non-Indians were prohibited from staying overnight.

On January 11, 1970, a letter from Earl Livermore, was written to the National Council on Indian Opportunity.

In an interview with "Radio Free Alcatraz", John Trudell (Santee Dakota), lamented that "water is still our big number one problem" and how, "rapidly, our number two problem is becoming electricity." The government often shut off all electricity to the island and made it difficult for water to reach the occupants in an effort to make them desert the island.

After Oakes left, LaNada Means, John Trudell, Stella Leach, and Al Miller were challenged with reorganizing and did so upon creating Indians of All Tribes. Means, having been in a family that was always active in tribal politics, was comfortable briefing reporters on how reservations operated or directing occupiers on island clean up. So when Robert Robertson, a Republican working for the National Council on Indian Opportunity, arrived on the island in 1970, just a week after Yvonne Oakes' passing, Means took the lead in trying to negotiate her planning grant for the cultural center, museum, and Thunderbird University of Alcatraz that she wrote. Along with Means, Robertson originally met with a group of occupiers to discuss safety and negotiations regarding the occupation. He was surprised that only ten men were present while forty American Indian women were present and active in discussion. When the initial meeting ended, Means invited Robertson to a private dinner between her and three lawyers to propose a $500,000 grant to renovate the island. Robertson, however, refused and would continue to refuse the occupiers' proposals until finally, in May 1970, the federal government began to transfer Alcatraz to the Department of the Interior and the National Park System.

LaNada Means attempted to find different routes to support Indians of All Tribes and those still on Alcatraz. Means believed that if she could hire a high-profile attorney to represent their claim for the Treaty of Fort Laramie, the IAT would win their case. So, she travelled further and further away from the island and found a high-profile supporting attorney by the name of Edward Bennett Williams who was willing to work pro-bono, to secure Alcatraz as Indian Land for all time, and to fight against Native American injustices in this country. Meanwhile, communication between Trudell and Means, Radio Alcatraz and the Occupation Initiator, began to subside and opposing views began to form. These opposing views between Means and Trudell are only one simple example of the power struggle that was one of the main reasons for the demise of the occupation. Their demands proved contradictory to each other, and their inability to see past differences and compromise proved detrimental to the occupation of the island.

By late May, the government had cut off all electrical power and all telephone service to the island. In June, a fire of disputed origin destroyed numerous buildings on the island. Left without power, fresh water, and in the face of diminishing public support and sympathy, the number of occupiers began to dwindle. On June 11, 1971, a large force of government officers removed the remaining 15 people from the island, who were then taken by the Coast Guard to Yerba Buena Island, fed lunch, and put aboard a Navy bus for the Senator Hotel in San Francisco.

Though fraught with controversy and forcibly ended, the Occupation is hailed by many as a success for having attained international attention for the situation of native peoples in the United States, and for sparking more than 200 instances of civil disobedience among Native Americans.

== Impact ==
The Occupation of Alcatraz had a direct effect on federal Indian policy and, with its visible results, established a precedent for Indian activism. Robert Robertson, director of the National Council on Indian Opportunity (NCIO), was sent to negotiate with the protesters. His offer to build a park on the island for Indian use was rejected, as the IAT were determined to possess the entire island and hoped to build a cultural center there. While the Nixon administration did not accede to the demands of the protesters, it was aware of the delicate nature of the situation, and so could not forcibly remove them. Spurred in part by Spiro Agnew's support for Native American rights, federal policy began to progress away from termination and toward Indian autonomy. In Nixon's July 8, 1970, Indian message, he decried termination, proclaiming, "self-determination among Indian people can and must be encouraged without the threat of eventual termination." While this was a step toward substantial reform, the administration was hindered by its bureaucratic mentality, unable to change its methodical approach of dealing with Indian rights. Nixon's attitude toward Indian affairs soured with the November 2, 1972, occupation of the Bureau of Indian Affairs (BIA).

Much of the Indian rights activism of the period can be traced to the Occupation of Alcatraz. The Trail of Broken Treaties, the BIA occupation, the Wounded Knee Occupation, and the Longest Walk all have their roots in the occupation. The American Indian Movement noted from their visit to the occupation that the demonstration garnered national attention, while those involved faced no punitive action. When AIM members seized the Mayflower II on Thanksgiving, 1970, the Occupation of Alcatraz was noted as "the symbol of a newly awakened desire among Indians for unity and authority in a white world".

The occupation of Alcatraz Island served as a strong symbol and uniting force for Indigenous peoples everywhere because of the importance the island held in their ancestors' lives. Indians traveled to Alcatraz about 10,000 years before the Europeans even entered the Bay Area. Over the course of their history, the island served the purpose as a camping ground, was used as a place to hunt for food, and at one point became an isolated and remote place where law violators were held. The occupation which began in 1969 caused Native Americans to remember what the island meant to them as a people. Although the Alcatraz occupation inspired many other Pan-Indian movements to occur, it also showed how gender played a part in Indian activism. Mainstream media had an obsession with documenting the stereotype of the male Indian warrior and as such it was only the men that were highlighted as being the leaders and creators of movements. Women at the occupation of Alcatraz, such as LaNada Means and Stella Leach, receive little attention for contributing to the movement. As a result, the many women who had initiated movements such as the Wounded Knee Incident would never be as well known as Russell Means and other AIM leaders, even though, in the case of Wounded Knee, of the 350 occupiers, just 100 were men. Quoted in John William Sayer's Ghost Dancing the Law: The Wounded Knee Trials, John Trudell admitted, in reflection, "We got lost in our manhood."

== Radio Free Alcatraz ==
The radio station formed a key ingredient in the occupation of Alcatraz. It broadcast half-hour programs at least 39 times via Pacifica stations KPFA (Berkeley), KPFK (Los Angeles), WBAI (New York), regularly at 7:15 pm PST, to more than 100,000 listeners. Today, the Pacifica Radio Archives has physical copies of 39 broadcasts and four broadcasts have been digitally preserved and are available. Its content consisted of discussions with various members of the occupation, whether American Indian or not; and addresses by its prime mover, John Trudell, a Santee Sioux veteran. The station ended its operation when the Federal Government cut off electric power to the island in late May 1971. The FBI regarded Trudell as an especially dangerous voice for Native rights.

Trudell spoke about key issues in Native life: forcible loss of ancestral lands, matters of spirituality, seriously contaminated water supply on Native reservations, sharp inequalities in infant mortality and life expectancy among Native Americans, as contrasted with the majority white US public. He addressed listeners as a plainspoken but calm mediator, not in stinging rhetoric. Each program began with Buffy Sainte Marie's song "Now That the Buffalo's Gone".

== Legacies ==
Writer Julian Brave NoiseCat talks about the occupation of Alcatraz as part of the Government of California's Native American Heritage Month 2019 campaign.

Some 50 of the Alcatraz occupiers traveled to the East Bay and began an occupation of an abandoned and dilapidated Nike Missile installation located in the hills behind the community of Kensington in June 1971. This occupation was ended after three days by a combined force of Richmond Police and regular US Army troops from the Presidio of San Francisco. Moreover, the Alcatraz Occupation greatly influenced the American government's decision to end its Indian termination policy and to pass the Indian Self-Determination and Education Assistance Act of 1975.

The takeover of Alcatraz inspired the Occupation of Catalina Island by the Brown Berets during the Chicano Movement in 1972.

The Alcatraz Occupation led to an annual celebration of the rights of Indigenous people, Unthanksgiving Day, welcome to all visitors to a dawn ceremony under permits by the National Park Service.

In March 1970, a Seattle-based group called the United Indians of All Tribes occupied Fort Lawton, demanding the return of Indigenous lands that were about to be declared surplus. The organization and their action was expressly modeled on the Indians of All Tribes and the occupation of Alcatraz. Bernie Whitebear, one of those involved, stated that "We saw what could be achieved there and if it had not been for their determined effort on Alcatraz, there would have been no movement here. We would like to think that Alcatraz lives on in part through Ft. Lawton."

== Cultural interpretations ==
- Cheyenne and Arapho novelist Tommy Orange included the event in his 2018 debut novel, "There There" and its follow-up, "Wandering Stars."

== See also ==
- Chicago Indian Village
- Wounded Knee Occupation
