= Robert C. North =

American political scientist (1914–2002)

Robert Carver North (November 17, 1914 – July 15, 2002) was an American political scientist, noted for pioneering the use of quantitative analytic methods in international studies. He graduated from Union College and was an English schoolteacher before enlisting in the army during World War II. He then completed a master's and doctorate at Stanford University and the Hoover Institution, and joined the faculty of Stanford in the department of political science, becoming professor emeritus in 1985.

In 2025, an executive order signed by Donald Trump declassified more than 70,000 pages of material related to the assassination of JFK, which also revealed North as a CIA informant. His work included identifying suspected sleeper agents among Cuban refugees during the Cuban missile crisis.
