= Dorothy Lonewolf Miller =

Blackfoot activist

- Born: 1920; West Liberty, Iowa
- Died: May 30, 2003 (aged 82–83); Richmond, California
- Occupation: Social worker
- Years active: 1940-2000
- Known for: Alcatraz occupation health worker, activist

Dorothy Lonewolf Miller (1920 – May 30, 2003) was a Blackfoot activist from Iowa. She was a union organizer, social worker and health care advocate, who participated in the Alcatraz occupation, providing support at the health clinic established on the island. She spent 40 years researching social issues and providing social services to Native Americans, children, prisoners, and mental health patients in California and was posthumously inducted into the California Social Work Hall of Distinction in 2004.

== Biography ==
Dorothy Lonewolf Miller, who was part Blackfoot, was born in 1920 in West Liberty, Iowa. At the age of 19, she was part of the Iowa Writers' Workshop and began publishing poems in anthologies. Around the same time, she began working in factories in Iowa as a union organizer, starting a lifelong career of activism. Miller enrolled in the University of Iowa earning a bachelor's degree in 1955 in sociology. She continued her studies there, obtaining a master's degree in Social Work in 1957.

In the 1960s, she moved to California and became a part of the national deinstitutionalization movement, advocating for mental health patients to be treated from home rather than institutionalized. She worked and researched at the California Department of Mental Hygiene and contributed to the legislative reforms of the state hospital systems. In 1966, Miller left public service to found a non-profit research firm, Scientific Analysis Corporation, of San Francisco. Among the social policies she researched were alcoholism's effect on children, mental health, prison reform, runaways and urban American Indians. In 1967, Miller completed her PhD in Social Welfare at UC Berkeley and in 1968 her research was used to help pass the Lanterman-Petris-Short Act. That same year, she founded and became director of the Institute for Scientific Analysis (ISA).

When Native Americans began the occupation of Alcatraz Island, Miller worked with Stella Leach, an LPN who was the primary organizer, and Jenny Joe, along with volunteer doctors to provide health services at a clinic established on the island in one of the buildings. She also wrote poems about the event to help publicize it and preserve the memory of the occupation for posterity, in nearly a dozen verses written during the occupation. Miller also sat up an "Indian Desk" at her company to channel money and communications to the occupiers, manning both the Indians of All Tribes bank account and radio services between Alcatraz and the mainland.

Throughout the 1970s and 1980s, Miller conducted research and published her findings on social services and welfare. Many of her studies were state- or federally-funded programs which launched initiatives and organizations for improving education and services to various sectors of society. She continued serving as director of the ISA until her retirement in 2000. She donated 400 books on Native Americans to the Soboba Band of Luiseno Indians in San Jacinto, California shortly before her death to enable to tribe to establish a library. In her honor, they created the Lonewolf Reading Room and established the Cham-Mix Poki (House of our Culture) to house the collection.

Miller died on May 30, 2003, and in 2004 was posthumously inducted into the California Social Work Hall of Distinction.

== Selected works ==
- Miller, Dorothy Lonewolf; Joe, Jennie R (1989). "Barriers and Survival: A Study of an Urban Indian Health Center" (PDF). American Indian Culture and Research Journal. 13 (3–4): 233–256. doi:10.17953/aicr.13.3-4.5613516316x12124. ISSN 0161-6463.
- Miller, Dorothy Lonewolf; De Jong, David H (1990). Native Americans in Tucson, our home—your city: report to Metropolitan Tucson Commission on Urban Native American Affairs (Report). Tucson, Arizona: Metropolitan Tucson Commission on Urban Native American Affairs.
- Miller, Dorothy Lonewolf (1991). Native Americans in Tucson, our home—your city : Report 2, Community agencies respond to Native American needs (Report). Tucson, Arizona: Metropolitan Tucson Commission on Urban Native American Affairs.
- Miller, Dorothy Lonewolf; Joe, Jennie R (1991). "The Dilemma of Navajo Industrial Workers". Nature, Society, and Thought: A Journal of Dialectical and Historical Materialism. 4: 310.
- Miller, Dorothy Lonewolf; Joe, Jennie R (June 1993). "Employment Barriers and Work Motivation for Navajo Rehabilitation Clients". International Journal of Rehabilitation Research. 16 (2): 107–117. doi:10.1097/00004356-199306000-00003. PMID 8349398. S2CID 44888576.

== Sources ==
- Goldstein, Margaret J. (January 1, 2011). You Are Now on Indian Land: The American Indian Occupation of Alcatraz Island, California, 1969. Minneapolis, Minnesota: Twenty-First Century Books. ISBN 978-0-7613-7276-9.
- Johnson, Troy R. (January 1, 1996). The Occupation of Alcatraz Island: Indian Self-determination and the Rise of Indian Activism. Urbana, Illinois: University of Illinois Press. ISBN 978-0-252-06585-9.
- Rader, Dean (2011). Engaged Resistance: American Indian Art, Literature, and Film from Alcatraz to the NMAI. Austin, Texas: University of Texas Press. ISBN 978-0-292-72399-3.
