= Richard Oakes (activist) =

Mohawk American Indian activist (1942–1972)

- Born: May 22, 1942; Akwesasne, New York, U.S.
- Died: September 20, 1972 (aged 30); Annapolis, California, U.S.
- Cause of death: Gunshot wound
- Citizenship: Akwesasronon
- Occupation: Activist
- Known for: Occupation of Alcatraz
- Spouse: Annie Marrufo (1960-1972)
- Children: 7

Richard Oakes (May 22, 1942 – September 20, 1972) was a Mohawk American Indian activist and academic. He spurred American Indian studies in university curricula and is credited for helping to change US federal government termination policies of American Indian peoples and culture. Oakes led a nineteen-month occupation of Alcatraz Island with LaNada Means, approximately 50 California State University students, and 37 others. The Occupation of Alcatraz is credited for opening a rediscovered unity among all American Indian tribes.

== Early life ==
Richard Oakes was born on May 22, 1942, on the St. Regis Mohawk Reservation, a location known in Mohawk as Akwesasne, the US portion of a reservation that spills into Canada across the St. Lawrence River. Like many of his ancestors, Oakes spent most of his childhood fishing and planting beans. He then began working at a local dock area on the St. Lawrence Seaway, but was laid off at the age of sixteen, after which he worked as a high steelworker, a job that entailed a great deal of traveling.

== Marriage and education ==
While working on the Claiborne Pell Newport Bridge, Oakes met and married an Italian/English woman from Bristol, Rhode Island. They had one son. Pressured out of his marriage by his father-in-law, Oakes left the two, divorcing his wife, and traveled west. He reached San Francisco and decided to enroll at San Francisco State University. While studying at SFSU, Oakes worked as a bartender in the Mission District of San Francisco, which brought him in contact with the local Native American communities.

== American Indian studies ==
Oakes was disappointed with the classes offered at San Francisco State and went on to work with an anthropology professor, Dr. Bea Medicine, to create one of the first Departments of American Indian Studies in the nation. He developed the initial curriculum and encouraged other American Indians to enroll at San Francisco State University. At the same time, the Mohawk National Council was forming and traveling in troupes to fight oppression of Mohawk religion by means of peaceful protest, which they called White Roots of Peace. In the spring of 1969, Oakes met the members of the White Roots of Peace, who encouraged him to take a stand and fight for what he believed in. Oakes had also gained the support of many students. He went on to play an integral role in the Occupation of Alcatraz. Also in 1969, he married Annie Marrufo, who was part of the Pomo Nation, and Oakes adopted all five of her children.

== Alcatraz occupation ==
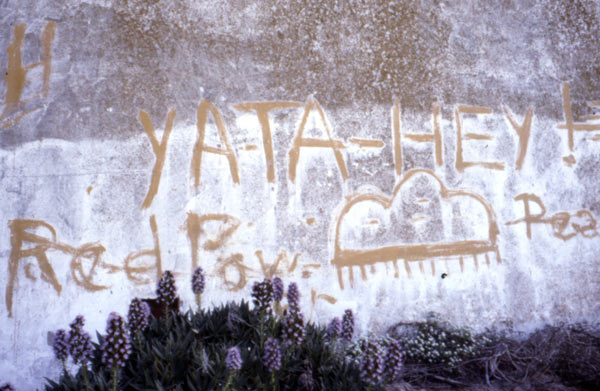
Graffiti from the occupation, featuring a Navajo greeting, "Yata Hey"

In 1969, Oakes led a group of students and urban Bay Area American Indians in an occupation of Alcatraz Island that would last until 1971. He also recruited 80 UCLA students from the American Indian Studies Center.

Many other Nations had already attempted to circle the island in boats but all were unsuccessful. When boats stopped during their course, Oakes chose to swim through the rest of the Bay and directly took control of the island. Indigenous Americans of various Nations joined Oakes and staged the longest occupation of a federal facility by American Indians.

The historic occupation was made up initially of young indigenous college students from around San Francisco and UCLA. Oakes was considered a noted activist during the occupation according to The American Indian Quarterly.

Oakes had control of the island from the very beginning, with an organizational council put into effect immediately. Everyone had a job, including security, sanitation, day care, schooling, cooking, and laundry. All decisions were made by the unanimous consent of the people.

The occupiers proclaimed their purpose as "To better the lives of all Indian people" by making "known to the world that we have a right to use our land for our own benefit" through reclaiming Alcatraz "in the name of all American Indians by right of discovery."

In 1970 the island began to fall into disarray. On January 5, 1970, Oakes' 12-year-old adopted daughter, Yvonne, fell to her death onto concrete steps. After her funeral, Oakes and Marrufo left the island.

Conflicts over leadership and the influx of non-indigenous Americans diminished the important stance of the original occupants. In June 1971 the United States government removed the remaining 15 occupants from the island.

While Oakes and his followers did not succeed in obtaining the island, they did affect U.S. policy and the treatment of Indians. As a result of the occupation, the official U.S. government policy of termination of Indian tribes was ended and replaced by a policy of Indian self-determination.

== After Alcatraz and his death ==
After leaving Alcatraz, Oakes continued his resistance. He helped the Pit River Tribe in their attempts to regain nearly 3 million acres of land that had been seized by Pacific Gas & Electric. Oakes also planned to create a "mobile university" dedicated to creating opportunity for Native Americans, but this never came to fruition. As a result of his activism, he endured tear gas, billy clubs, and brief stints in jail.

Soon after Alcatraz, Oakes was shot and killed near Annapolis, California, in rural Sonoma County by Michael Morgan, a YMCA camp manager. Oakes reportedly confronted him, and Morgan alleged he was in fear for his life, and responded by drawing a handgun and fatally shooting Oakes. Oakes was unarmed when he was shot. Morgan was charged with voluntary manslaughter, but was acquitted by a jury that agreed with Morgan that the killing was an act of self-defense. Oakes supporters contend the shooting was an act of murder, and that Morgan received support from a racially motivated jury and district attorney. Oakes was 30 years old.

== Tributes ==
- In 1971, musician Leon Russell released a song about the occupation titled "Alcatraz".
- In 1984, television stations broadcast the ballet Song for Dead Warriors as part of the PBS Dance in America series. The ballet, choreographed by Michael Smuin, was inspired by Oakes' life.
- In 1999, San Francisco State University dedicated their new Multicultural Center after their former student. His student-led occupation led to the establishment of an American Indian Studies Department at SFSU.
- In 2012, the band Field Report paid tribute to Oakes and his occupation of Alcatraz in the song "Taking Alcatraz."
- In 2016 the artist Magneto Dayo and The Lakota Medicine Men paid tribute to Oakes, Russell Means, John Trudell, and others on a song called "The Journey" on the album Royalty of the UnderWorld.
- On May 22, 2017, Oakes was recognized with a Google Doodle to mark what would have been his 75th birthday.
