= Grace Thorpe =

American activist (1921–2008)

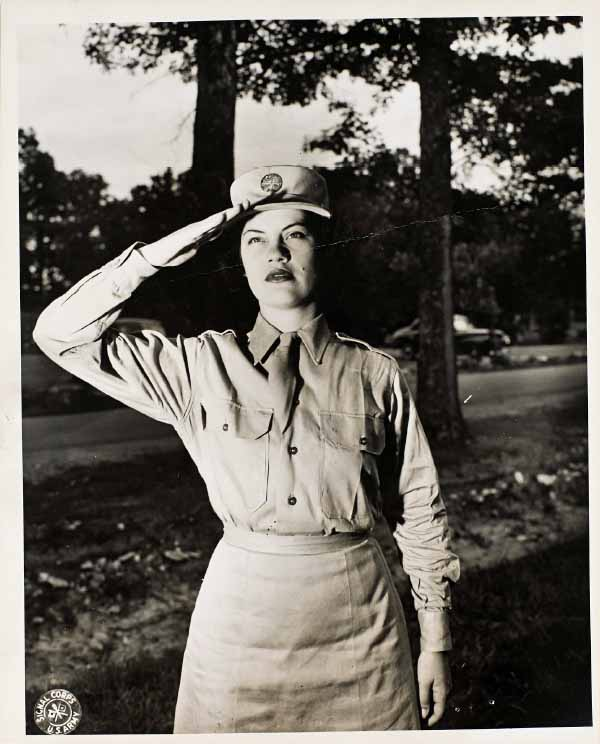
- Grace Thorpe Joins WAACS
- Born: Grace Frances Thorpe; December 10, 1921; Yale, Oklahoma, U.S.
- Died: April 1, 2008 (aged 86)
- Education: University of Tennessee

Grace Frances Thorpe (December 10, 1921 – April 1, 2008) was an American environmentalist and Native rights activist. She served with the Women's Army Corps and received a Bronze Star Medal for her service as a Corporal in the New Guinea campaign. She attended the University of Tennessee at Knoxville and the Antioch School of Law, and went on to become a tribal district court judge. In 1999, she received a Nuclear-Free Future Award for her opposition to storing toxic and radioactive waste on indigenous land.

Her father was well-known American football player and Olympic athlete Jim Thorpe. The Grace F. Thorpe Collection is held by the National Museum of the American Indian Archives Center.

== Personal life ==
Thorpe was born on December 10, 1921, to parents James (Jim) Francis Thorpe (Sac and Fox) and Iva Margaret Miller. Her tribal heritage included Potawatomi, Kickapoo, Sac and Fox, and Menominee ancestry, and she was a direct descendant of Sac and Fox chief Black Hawk. She was born in Yale, Oklahoma in the only house her father ever owned. Now a museum, it is known as the Jim Thorpe House and can be visited by tourists year round. Grace was the youngest of four; her oldest sister Gail Margaret was born in 1917, her brother James in 1918, and her sister Charlotte Marie in 1919. Her brother James died from polio before reaching adolescence.

By the time of Grace's birth, her father, Jim Thorpe, was already an Olympic medalist. When Iva and Jim divorced in 1923, Jim moved to California to pursue film, while Iva took Charlotte, Gail, and Grace to Chicago. Grace lived with both parents for several years before finishing high school. Jim married two more times in his lifetime, giving Grace four half-brothers, with whom she had little interaction. Grace remained close with her father, however, and visited him frequently as he moved around the country.

Grace wanted to travel and serve her country during World War II. Though she had envisioned herself in places like Paris or Athens, she was assigned to serve as a corporal in the Philippines, Japan, and New Guinea from 1944 to 1945. Following an Honorable Discharge in 1945, she remained in Japan. She began work in Japan at General MacArthur Headquarters as Chief of the Recruitment Section, Department of Army Civilians, Tokyo. In June 1946, she married Lieutenant Fred W. Seely (1918-2008). Together they had two children, Dagmar Thorpe (1946) and Paul Thorpe (1948–1964), both born in Japan. In 1950, the couple divorced, and Thorpe and her children left Japan and returned to the United States to live in Pearl River, New York, near her father's home. In 1967, Grace moved to Arizona and began to focus on her activism.

Grace Frances Thorpe died on April 1, 2008, from complications following a heart attack. She is remembered for her military, legal, and activist legacy.

== Military career ==
In 1943, Thorpe enlisted in the military and joined the Women's Army Corps (WAC). After attending training and graduating from the WAAC Training Center in Fort Oglethorpe, Georgia, Thorpe was elevated to the rank of Corporal. She served as a Recruiter for the Women's Army Corps in Tucson and Camp White in Oregon until she was assigned to the New Guinea campaign. She was subsequently stationed in the Philippines and Japan. She was later awarded a Bronze Star for her service in the battle of New Guinea.

== Native rights activism ==
=== Alcatraz occupation ===
In late 1969 and 1970, Grace Thorpe joined a group of Native activists in their occupation of Alcatraz Island off the coast of San Francisco. This occupation called national attention to a long history of Native grievances that the activists felt the federal government was too slow in addressing. This occupation represented a watershed moment for Native activism. Thorpe recalled in a radio interview, "Alcatraz was the catalyst and the most important event in the Indian movement to date. It made me put my furniture into storage and spend my life savings." During the occupation she managed publicity for the group and acted as a negotiator between the activists and the federal government. She successfully secured a generator, water barge, and ambulance service for the group. After Alcatraz, Thorpe remained involved in agitation for Native rights, participating in further occupations of Fort Lawton, Washington in March 1970 and Nike Missile Base near Davis, California in November 1970.

=== National Congress of American Indians ===
After her participation in the occupations of 1969 and 1970, Thorpe went on to be a lobbyist on behalf of the National Congress of American Indians, working especially to further economic opportunities for Native families on reservations by pushing factories to locate on Native land. She had a special focus on training Native workers for factory jobs, saying in 1971 that there was "no reason we can't train our own people where some factories have training schools for the Indians. Let Indians train Indians."

=== National Indian Women's Action Corps ===
In 1971 Thorpe cofounded the National Indian Women's Action Corps, a group that focused on empowering Native women and strengthening indigenous family units. She told a journalist in March 1971, "We Indian women decided to start beating the drum for ourselves… We want all Indian women who want to be active to join us in finding solutions to our problems." The group's focus on family units derived in part from the history of the American government removing Native children from their families and sending them to live in white households or in boarding schools.

== Work in United States Congress ==
During the mid-1970s Grace Thorpe represented Native interests in her interactions with the United States Congress. In 1974 she worked as a legislative assistant in the Senate Subcommittee for Indian Affairs. She then became a member of the American Indian Policy Review Board, working in Communications and Public Information. The Policy Review Board was created to improve congressional policy creation and implementation regarding indigenous groups and existed from 1975 to 1977.

== Legal career ==
Thorpe earned a paralegal degree from Antioch School of Law in 1974 and earned her bachelor's degree in American Indian Law at the University of Tennessee, Knoxville, in 1980. She also worked as a part-time district court judge for the Five Tribes of Oklahoma.

== Environmental activism ==
Thorpe's environmental activism began in 1992 when she learned from a Daily Oklahoman article that her Sac and Fox tribe had accepted a federal grant to study the placement of radioactive waste on tribal land. The Department of Energy's Monitored Retrievable Storage (MRS) program was offering $100,000 to study the possibility of temporarily storing used nuclear rods on tribal land before moving them to permanent storage on government land. The Sac and Fox, as well as sixteen other Native American tribes, accepted the grant, believing that the money would come without strings attached and would help alleviate their high unemployment.

Thorpe researched nuclear waste and its hazards, as well as the details of the funding, most of which in fact went to lawyers and consultants. She started working to convince her tribe to withdraw from the program, and went through the process outlined in the Sac and Fox constitution to reverse the decision of the elected tribal leaders; she gathered signatures of 50 tribe members on a petition calling for a special meeting, and at that meeting on February 29, 1992, 70 out of 75 members present voted to withdraw from the MRS program. The only five in favor were the five elected officials. The Sac and Fox were the first tribe to withdraw from the MRS program.

Thorpe continued her fight against what she called "environmental racism". She helped found the National Environmental Coalition of Native Americans (NECONA) in 1993 and served as its president, traveling around the country and working to educate tribes about the dangers of storing nuclear waste and persuade them to refuse the MRS. Part of this work also involved persuading tribe leaders to rewrite their constitutions and revert their government to democracy rather than elected tribal councils, which were established under the Bureau of Indian Affairs in 1934 and were more susceptible to government pressure. Also in 1993, NECONA joined forces with Nuclear Free America, an international clearinghouse for information about Nuclear Free Zones. Together they created the Nuclear Free Indian Lands Project, which urged tribal governments to pass Nuclear Free Zone laws banning the dumping of nuclear waste and transportation of nuclear residue through tribal lands. Within three years of learning of the MRS, Thorpe had persuaded 15 out of the 17 tribes that had initially accepted the grant to withdraw, including all 11 tribes in her home state of Oklahoma. In 1999, she received a Nuclear-Free Future Award for this work.

== See also ==
- Private Fuel Storage
