= Hupa (disambiguation) =

Hupa are a Native American people in northwestern California (including the Federally recognized Hoopa Valley Tribe).

Hupa or Hoopa can refer to:

- Hupa language, the Athabaskan language of the Hupa people
- Hupa traditional narratives
- USS Hupa (SP-650), a United States Navy ship
- Hoopa, California, an unincorporated community Humboldt County, California, U.S.
- Hoopa Valley, a valley along the Trinity River in northern California
- Trinity River (California), a major river in northwest California natively called "Hoopa" or "Hupa"
- Hoopa (Pokémon), a fictional species of Mythical Pokémon in the Pokémon series

== See also ==
- Chuppah, a wedding canopy in Judaism
- Hoopla (disambiguation)
