= Vivien Hailstone =

Native American basket maker from California, U.S. (1913–2000)

- Detail of Vivien Hailstone from photograph of Buck and Vivien Hailstone at 4th of July Parade (1955)
- Born: Vivien Geneva Risling; October 16, 1913; Humboldt County, California, U.S.
- Died: July 8, 2000 (aged 86)
- Citizenship: Hoopa Valley Tribe and American
- Occupations: basketweaver; jewelry designer

Vivien Risling Hailstone (October 16, 1913 – July 8, 2000) was a Hupa/Yurok/Karuk basketweaver, jeweler, activist and educator who led efforts to sustain traditional basket weaving patterns and techniques. Hailstone also had an impact on statewide policy for repatriation of Native American remains and returning to Native American names for parks through her involvement with the State of California Department of Parks and Recreation Commission.

== Early life ==
Vivien Hailstone was born Vivien Geneva Risling in Humboldt County, California on October 16, 1913 to Geneva Orcutt (Yurok/Karuk) and David Risling (Hupa/Karok). Her great-grandmother, Jane Young (Yurok), taught her many traditional stories, songs, and basketry techniques. She was an enrolled citizen of the Hoopa Valley Tribe. Her brother was David Risling, Jr. a co-founder of D–Q University. Hailstone grew up in a rural area, and at age 10, she was enrolled in a Bureau of Indian Affairs boarding school in the Hoopa Valley In 1940, Vivien married Albert Hailstone (Wintu), and they had a child, Albert Jr.

== Career and advocacy ==
Hailstone's efforts to sustain and promote traditional basketry are evidenced through her work in her Native community and her teaching at local colleges. She was a founding member of a pottery guild in the 1940s which incorporated Indian basketry designs into pottery designs. She served as Chair of College of the Redwood Extension Board of Directors in the 1950s and taught basketry classes at D–Q University. In 1959, Hailstone opened I-Ye-Quee Trading Post & Gift Shop, which contributed to a revival of interest in Native American basketry.

Hailstone was also an accomplished jewelry maker and designer.

In addition to her basketmaking and jewelry, Hailstone was also an advocate for education and Native American concerns at the state level. She was a founding member of the Redding, California chapter of the California Indian Education Association. In the 1970s, Hailstone became the first Native American to serve on the State of California Department of Parks and Recreation Commission. She advocated for a reburial policy for remains and using Native American names for parks.

== Death and legacy ==
Vivien Hailstone died in 2000. In 2003, the California Indian Basketweavers Association produced a video documenting Hailstone's life and basketry techniques. Throughout her life Hailstone collected baskets. Her collection, along with pieces collected by her son Albert, were donated to the Clarke Historical Museum in Eureka, California.
