= Verdena Parker =

Last fluent speaker of the Hupa language (1936–2026)

- Born: Verdena Leona Chase Shoemaker; March 1, 1936; Hoopa Valley, California, U.S.
- Died: March 7, 2026 (aged 90)
- Citizenship: Hupa
- Known for: Last fluent speaker of the Hupa language

Verdena Leona Parker (née Chase Shoemaker; March 1, 1936 – March 7, 2026) was the last fluent speaker of the Hupa language, an Athabaskan language spoken by the Hoopa Valley Tribe, indigenous to northern California. While other children of her generation were sent to boarding schools, isolating them from their families, Parker was raised by her grandmother, who spoke Hupa with her. Through adulthood, Parker continued to speak Hupa with her mother daily, maintaining a high level of fluency despite language loss in the rest of the Hupa community.

Beginning in 2008, Parker regularly worked with researchers at UC Berkeley and Stanford to provide recordings of spoken Hupa for the documentation of the Hupa language. She was also active in language revitalization projects.

Parker died on March 7, 2026, six days after her 90th birthday; the Hupa language went extinct with her death.
