= Helen A. Stafford =

American plant biochemist and physiologist

- Born: August 9, 1922; Philadelphia
- Died: August 12, 2011 (aged 89); Portland, Oregon
- Education: Wellesley College, BA; Connecticut College, MA; University of Pennsylvania, Ph.D.; University of Chicago, Post-doc
- Occupations: plant physiologist and phytochemist
- Organization: Phytochemical Society of North America

Helen Adele Stafford (August 9, 1922, Philadelphia – August 12, 2011, Portland, Oregon) was an American plant physiologist and phytochemist. She was from 1977 to 1978 the president of the Phytochemical Society of North America.

== Biography ==
Helen A. Stafford attended Quaker schools in Philadelphia. She became interested in botany when tending her father's garden.

She became an undergraduate at Wellesley College, where she graduated in 1944 with a B.A. in botany. For the academic year 1945–1946, she worked with orchid cultures as a research assistant to Lewis Knudson at Cornell University. In 1946 she transferred to the Connecticut College for Women. There she was supported by a two-year assistantship under the supervision of Richard H. Goodwin and graduated with an M.A. in botany. Her thesis research on timothy grass seedlings was published in 1948 in the American Journal of Botany. Stafford and Goodwin corresponded for many years after her graduation.

For three years from 1948 to 1951 she was a graduate student in the botany department of the University of Pennsylvania, where she received her Ph.D. under the supervision of David R. Goddard. However, due to institutional prejudice, Stafford was not allowed to teach male students. Stafford's doctoral dissertation was pioneering research on the cellular localization of plant enzymes by applying differential centrifugation to cell-free homogenates. From 1951 to 1954 she was a postdoc at the University of Chicago. There she was supervised by Birgit Vennesland and did research on "NAD+/NADP+ dependent dehydrogenases acting on hydroxy acids in plants". In 1954 the Annual Review of Plant Physiology published the review paper Location of enzymes in the cells of higher plants coauthored by Stafford and Goddard. The 1954 review established her as a leading expert on this subject.

Stafford's outstanding published research, as well as her teaching at the University of Chicago, impressed Reed College's Lewis Kleinholz (1910–2001), who recruited her for Reed's biology department. When Stafford arrived in 1954 at Reed College, she was the first woman to join the faculty in the division of mathematics and natural sciences. In Reed's biology department, she was an assistant professor from 1954 to 1959, an associate professor from 1959 to 1965, and a full professor from 1965 to 1987, when she retired as professor emerita. From 1958 to 1959 she was on academic leave of absence at Harvard University, with the support of a Guggenheim fellowship. She was the first Reed professor to win a Guggenheim fellowship. She spent sabbatical years at the University of California at Los Angeles, Yale University, and the Oregon Graduate Center. At the Oregon Graduate Center, she worked with T'Sai-Ying Cheng (who was the first woman to graduate with a Ph.D. from Princeton University).

Stafford was the author or co-author of more than 70 scientific articles. She was an authority on the phytochemistry and plant physiology of flavonoids. For many years, her 1990 book Flavonoid Metabolism was a definitive text.

Helen Stafford served from 1964 to 1992 on the editorial board of Plant Physiology. From 1989 to 1993 she was editor-in-chief of the book series Recent Advances in Phytochemistry, published by Plenum Press. This book series was published for over 3 decades — presenting phytochemical research, especially for natural biochemical products produced by plants. In 1996 the American Society of Plant Physiologists (renamed in 2001 the American Society of Plant Biologists) honored her with the Charles Reid Barnes Life Membership Award. She was the first woman to receive the award. During her career she was an outstanding teacher and role model for women scientists.

Stafford died after struggling with Alzheimer's disease. She was predeceased by her parents, her brother, and her sister and survived by a niece. In her will, Helem Stafford endowed Reed College's Morton O. Stafford Jr. Scholarship as a memorial to her brother, who was killed in World War II. USAAF Staff Sergeant Morton Ogden Stafford Jr. (1919–1943) was an aerial gunner killed in action when his aircraft was shot down in Romania. Helen Stafford's ashes were scattered in the Reed College Canyon, a 28-acre (11.3-hectare) watershed spanned by two pedestrian bridges and a land bridge.

== Selected publications ==
=== Articles ===
- Loewus, Frank A.; Stafford, Helen A. (1958). "Observations on the Incorporation of C^{14} into Tartaric Acid and the Labeling Pattern of D-Glucose from an Excised Grape Leaf Administered L-Ascorbic Acid-6-C^{14}". Plant Physiology. 33 (2): 155–156. doi:10.1104/pp.33.2.155. PMC 541046. PMID 16655098.
- Stafford, Helen A.; Loewus, Frank A. (1958). "The Fixation of C^{14}O_{2} into Tartaric and Malic Acids of Excised Grape Leaves". Plant Physiology. 33 (3): 194–199. doi:10.1104/pp.33.3.194. PMC 541060. PMID 16655112.
- Stafford, Helen A. (1959). "Distribution of Tartaric Acid in the Leaves of Certain Angiosperms". American Journal of Botany. 46 (5): 347–352. Bibcode:1959AmJB...46..347S. doi:10.1002/j.1537-2197.1959.tb07022.x.
- Stafford, Helen A. (1960). "Differences Between Lignin-like Polymers Formed by Peroxidation of Eugenol and Ferulic Acid in Leaf Sections of Phleum". Plant Physiology. 35 (1): 108–114. doi:10.1104/pp.35.1.108. PMC 405926. PMID 16655300.
- Stafford, Helen A. (1961). "Distribution of Tartaric Acid in the Geraniaceae". American Journal of Botany. 48 (8): 699–701. Bibcode:1961AmJB...48..699S. doi:10.1002/j.1537-2197.1961.tb11699.x.
- Stafford, Helen A. (1969). "Changes in phenolic compounds and related enzymes in young plants of sorghum". Phytochemistry. 8 (4): 743–752. Bibcode:1969PChem...8..743S. doi:10.1016/S0031-9422(00)85846-X.
- Stafford, H. A.; Galston, A. W. (1970). "Ontogeny and Hormonal Control of Polyphenoloxidase Isozymes in Tobacco Pith". Plant Physiology. 46 (6): 763–767. doi:10.1104/pp.46.6.763. PMC 396678. PMID 4993442.
- Stafford, H. A.; Dresler, S. (1972). "4-Hydroxycinnamic Acid Hydroxylase and Polyphenolase Activities in Sorghum vulgare". Plant Physiology. 49 (4): 590–595. doi:10.1104/pp.49.4.590. PMC 366011. PMID 16658007.
- Stafford, Helen A. (1975). "Transformations of a Large Aggregate of Hydroxycinnamate Hydroxylase to Lower Molecular Weight Forms by Sulfhydryl Agents in Green Leaves of Sorghum". Plant Physiology. 55 (2): 145–149. doi:10.1104/pp.55.2.145. PMC 541572. PMID 16659039.
- Stafford, Helen A.; Brown, Mark A. (1977). "Photochemical Dimerization of Ferulic Acid by Chloroplasts from Sorghum". Plant Physiology. 59 (1): 94–96. doi:10.1104/pp.59.1.94. PMC 542337. PMID 16659796.
- Stafford, H.A.; Cheng, T.-Y. (1980). "The procyanidins of Douglas fir seedlings, callus and cell suspension cultures derived from cotyledons". Phytochemistry. 19 (1): 131–135. Bibcode:1980PChem..19..131S. doi:10.1016/0031-9422(80)85029-1.
- Stafford, Helen A.; Shimamoto, Marc; Lester, Hope H. (1982). "Incorporation of [^{14}C]Phenylalanine into Flavan-3-ols and Procyanidins in Cell Suspension Cultures of Douglas Fir". Plant Physiology. 69 (5): 1055–1059. doi:10.1104/pp.69.5.1055. PMC 426358. PMID 16662344.
- Stafford, Helen A.; Kreitlow, Kelly S.; Lester, Hope H. (1986). "Comparison of Proanthocyanidins and Related Compounds in Leaves and Leaf-Derived Cell Cultures of Ginkgo bioloba L., Pseudotsuga menziesii Franco, and Ribes sanguineum Pursh". Plant Physiology. 82 (4): 1132–1138. doi:10.1104/pp.82.4.1132. PMC 1056271. PMID 16665147.
- Stafford, Helen A. (1991). "Flavonoid Evolution: An Enzymic Approach". Plant Physiology. 96 (3): 680–685. doi:10.1104/pp.96.3.680. PMC 1080830. PMID 16668242.
- Stafford, Helen A. (1997). "Roles of flavonoids in symbiotic and defense functions in legume roots". The Botanical Review. 63 (1): 27–39. Bibcode:1997BotRv..63...27S. doi:10.1007/BF02857916. S2CID 25624334.
- Stafford, Helen A. (2000). "Crown gall disease and Agrobacterium tumefaciens: A study of the history, present knowledge, missing information, and impact on molecular genetics". The Botanical Review. 66 (1): 99–118. Bibcode:2000BotRv..66...99S. doi:10.1007/BF02857784. S2CID 20130070.

=== Books ===
- Stafford, Helen A. (28 February 1990). Flavonoid Metabolism. CRC Press. ISBN 9780849360855.
- Towers, G. H. Neil; Stafford, Helen A., eds. (6 December 2012). Biochemistry of the Mevalonic Acid Pathway to Terpenoids. Vol. 24, Recent Advanced in Phytochemistry. Springer. ISBN 9781468487893. (1st edition 1990)
- Fischer, Nikolaus H.; Isman, Murray B.; Stafford, Helen A., eds. (1991). Modern Phytochemical Methods. Vol. 25, Recent Advances in Phytochemistry (1st ed.). Plenum Press.
- Stafford, Helen A.; Ibrahim, Ragai K., eds. (6 December 2012). Phenolic Metabolism in Plants. Vol. 26, Recent Advances in Phytochemistry. Springer. ISBN 9781461534303. (1st edition 1992)
- Downum, Kelsey R.; Romeo, John T.; Stafford, Helen A., eds. (29 June 2013). Phytochemical Potential of Tropical Plants. Vol. 27, Recent Advances in Phytochemistry. Springer. ISBN 9781489917836. (1st edition 1993)
- Ellis, Brian E.; Kuroki, Gary W.; Stafford, Helen A., eds. (6 December 2012). Genetic Engineering of Plant Secondary Metabolism. Vol. 28, Recent Advances in Phytochemistry. Springer. ISBN 9781461525448. (1st edition 1994)
