= Kumeyaay Community College =

Community college in San Diego County, California

Coordinates: 32.7833°N 116.8909°W

- Type: Public community college
- Established: 2004
- Address: 910 Willow Glen Dr. El Cajon, CA 92019, El Cajon, United States
- Website: http://kumeyaaycommunitycollege.com/

Kumeyaay Community College (formerly D–Q University) is a public community college in the U.S. state of California. Established in 2004 by the Sycuan Band of the Kumeyaay Nation through gaming revenues, it is located on the Sycuan Indian Reservation near El Cajon.

== History ==
In 1971, D–Q University was founded by American Indian Ph.D. Jack Forbes (Lenape), and other educational leaders such as David Risling (Hoopa). D-Q University was a partnership between American Indian and Chicano educators and activists during the tumultuous protest years of the late 1960s and early 1970s. Once established, D-Q University was the only American Indian college in California, and one of the first six American Indian colleges in the United States.

Starting in the 1990s, thanks to the visionary commitment to higher education by Kumeyaay Elder Hank Murphy and his wife Shirley Apple Murphy (Oglala Lakota) a D-Q University satellite campus was established on the Sycuan Reservation, which was the home of the Sycuan Band of the Kumeyaay Nation. A number of courses were offered at that time, including Yuman philosophy, Kumeyaay Bird Songs, English as a Second Language, Math, Fire Sciences for the Sycuan Fire Department, and of course the Kumeyaay language.

As a result of a Bureau of Indian Affairs technicality involving an American Indian-to-Chicano student ratio, and financial issues, the Bureau of Indian Affairs pulled the funding base away from D-Q University and by 2005 it had shut down. However, there is a new D-Q University Board of Trustees, and there are efforts to reestablish D-Q University as a viable institution.

When D-Q University fell into disarray for a lack of funding, plans were underway at Sycuan to start a Kumeyaay College. The possibility of a Kumeyaay College was envisioned for decades by Florence Shipek, Ph.D., an ethnohistorian who worked closely with the Kumeyaay and Luiseno nations for many decades. She foresaw the possibility of bequeathing her life's work to the Kumeyaay Nation and she sent letters to all the Kumeyaay tribal chairmen expressing the need for a Kumeyaay college that would promote the revitalization of Kumeyaay language, culture, and philosophy.

Given that Sycuan was the only place in the Kumeyaay territory that had been offering college classes, it was understood that the Shipek Collection would end up at Sycuan. However, in order to fulfill the wishes of Dr. Shipek, a Kumeyaay College had to be established as a condition of the Kumeyaay Nation receiving the Shipek Archives Collection. A Sycuan Tribal Council Resolution for Kumeyaay Community College was passed in 2004, which led to the founding of the Kumeyaay Community College and the establishment of the Kumeyaay Community College Board of Trustees that same year. The transfer of the Shipek Collection occurred in 2005, and today it forms the basis of the Kumeyaay Community College Library and Archives.

Kumeyaay Community College has board members from eight Reservations of the Kumeyaay Nation. In 2006, Kumeyaay Community College added additional courses, and with a partnership with Cuyamaca College had established a Kumeyaay Studies Certificate. Recently a new Kumeyaay Studies Degree is being offered through the partnership with Cuyamaca College.

== Academics ==
The Associate in Arts in Kumeyaay Studies is offered through Cuyamaca College and is designed to provide an understanding of Kumeyaay history, culture and heritage. It is a multi-disciplinary degree, drawing from the sciences, humanities, world languages and history departments. Through coursework that encompasses on-site learning experiences, students will learn about the Kumeyaay Nation of San Diego's East County region.

The required courses include Ethnoecology/Ethnobotany with a lab course, Kumeyaay History (Precontact-1900, and 1900–Present), Kumeyaay Arts & Culture, and two Kumeyaay Language courses.

=== Certificate of Specialization ===
Students who complete the requirements below qualify for a Certificate in Kumeyaay Studies. An official request must be filed with the Admissions and Records Office prior to the deadline as stated in the Academic Calendar. Upon successful completion of this program, students will be able to:
• Communicate in the Kumeyaay language at a basic level in a variety of settings.
• Acquire an understanding of Kumeyaay heritage, history, society and traditions.
• Gain sensitivity, globalism and cultural competence of a unique group of people.
