= Hupa traditional narratives =

Hupa traditional narratives include myths, legends, tales, and oral histories preserved of the Na:tinixwe people, known colloquially as the Hupa tribe and the Chilula and Whilkut tribelets of the Trinity River basin in northwestern California. Today, may tribal members reside on the federally recognized Hoopa Valley Reservation in Humboldt County, California. The population on the reservation was recorded to be 2,287 in the 2023 census with the main town being Hoopa, California.

The oral literature of the Hupa is markedly similar to that of their linguistically unrelated neighbors, the Karuk and Yurok. It differs from the traditional narratives of most California groups, but shows stronger links with the Northwest Coast region of North America.

Traditionally, Hupa myths explore the time before people, when the Kīxûnai (spiritual beings that still influence the world from beyond) existed. In addition, traditional narratives of legends have also been told which may include a religious character during human existence. All of the traditional narratives collected have been translated to English from the Hupa language.

== Hupa mythology ==
Hupa mythology varies village to village and even between families. The following myths are the most accepted versions.

=== Deities ===
Hupa deities share similarities and differences with the mythology of the neighboring Karuk and Yurok tribes. Yīmantūwiñyai ("the one who is lost across the ocean") can also be referred to as Yimankyuwinghoiyan ("old man over cross"). He has been found to be a combination of two Yurok deities; the tricky and erotic Wohpekumeu and the heroic Pelekukwerek. Yidetūwiñyai ("the one lost to us from the north") has no similarities to the neighboring Yurok and Karok mythology, though it is suggested to have influence from southern tribes. Yīnûkatsisdai ("in the south he lives" or "upstream he lives") seems to be the same as the Yurok Megwomets.

==== Yīmantūwiñyai ====
In this myth, Yīmantūwiñyai manifests in Tcōxōltcwediñ (myth-place) while smoke covered the land. After making fire, the Kīxûnai manifested, and he freed the deer from one and the Salmon, Eel, and surfish from a women, beginning the Klamath River in the process. Throughout this myth, Yīmantūwiñyai travels south of the river to terriform the land by creating a lake and various landmarks within the area. He formed the uterus of women to prevent death from birth and protected the people from killers and cannibals. Yīmantūwiñyai also distributed baskets and taught the Kīxûnai how to fish. He turned soaproots(Chlorogalum) into food that does not kill people and identified some medicines for the people, Hypericum scouleri and redwood sorrel (Oxalis oregana). From his feces, he created all other kinds of language—Yurok, Karuk, Shasta people, Tolowa, Mad River, Southfork, New River, and Redwood. After some help from the birds, he made a bill for buzzard, then he made the largest Woodpecker, Crow, Eagle, yellowhammer, little wood pecker, and all other birds fly.

Once the smoke rose to signify that the mortals were coming, the Kīxûnai left to the north world beyond the ocean. He wanted to measure the world to ensure that they will be able to live for generations without overcrowding. However, going west, the Maiyōtel (mythical beings) distracted him with a woman. Failing to renew the peoples' lives, Yīmantūwiñyai returned to the south of Big Lagoon where he placed a sweat-house for the people to dance if anything goes wrong with the ocean.

After the mortals manifested about the land, he went to the southern world's edge to find bluejay, and woman who would become Wintūn, had grown. Addressing him as her nephew, bluejay remarked on all the kinds of people that grew at the places he past and asked if he ate alongside them, which he did. Finally, he travelled to the north world beyond the ocean, away from the mortal realm and declared to his grandmother that he had made medicines for the people.

==== Yidetūwiñyai ====
Some identify Yidetūwiñyai to be the same as Yīmantūwiñyai. In this myth, he was born as a twin to the ground we walk on from the sun and the earth. After living in the world, the smoke rose to signal the coming mortals, so he fled out of fear and become lost from the mortals. He has ten dances and is believed to steal dance regalia from homes in the valley every night then returned in the morning. For young men to become rich in dance property, he should pray to Yidetūwiñyai.

==== Yīnûkatsisdai ====
Yīnûkatsisdai controls the vegetable world. In his myth, he was found by a woman as a baby in a hollow tree. He was then stolen by another woman who took him down the Klamath who threw a pestle at him and became a rock near Big Lagoon. He created all of the trees and plants for the mortals, and caused a flood when the people were bad. Sometimes he disguises himself among the people as a young boy with a long beard, carrying a basket of acorns and other vegetables. If he notices that the people are wasting food, he causes famine. During famine, the crows go throw him out of his house to share the food he withholds.

==== The Tans ====
While the previous three deities live separate from the mortal realm, there are deities who live adjacent to humans, within nature. Chief of these deities are the Tans, the deer-tending gods, who live in hills and ridges along the valley. Cautious to strangers, the Tans send spies through spiders or small birds. The Tans expect the hunter to sing and pray to them on the first night or the deer will be with-held and the hunter will be killed. If the hunter did sing and pray, the Tans send a deer to the hunter to stand still for the hunt, and the deer's ghost is believed to watch to ensure proper treatment of the body and reports this back to the Tans.

== Legends ==
=== The Boy Who Grew Up at Ta'k'imilding ===
This legend explains why the Hupa know when and where to perform traditional World Renewel or ch'idilye dances, also performed by the Yurok and Karuk tribes. These dances maintain the balance of the physical and social world through songs and dances to please the Kīxûnai. The two dancing ceremonies take place in 10 day cycles in August through September; the White Deerskin Dance going downstream through Hoopa Valley until reaching Bald Hill and the Jump Dance at the Bald Hill 10 days later.

These dances are said to come from an inspiration to the boy who grew up at in the xontah nikya:w [Big House] in the Ta'k'imlding [acorn-cooking place] village. Because was a good boy blessed with singing, he disappears into a cloud to join the Kīxûnai in the sky. Years later, he returns to his father to tell the people where and when to perform the two dances, promising to be there watching the Jump Dance behind the fence.

=== Grandfather's Ordeal ===
Minnie Reeves, a Chilula woman married into the Hupa lineage, recounts a legend told about her grandfather was shot by white settlers. Likely taking place in the late 1850s or early 1860s, hostility between white settlers and the Hupas, especially the Chilulas, was immensely high. Minnie's grandmother had become deathly ill, so the Chilula shaman sent her grandfather to retrieve a Hoopa shaman with a good reputation. On the journey back from Hoopa, her grandfather and the shaman were shot at by a group of white settlers on horseback. The shaman died immediately, but her grandfather played dead then dragged himself to a nearby cedar-bark hunting shelter. Concerned, the people at home went out to search for him and found her grandfather assumed to be dead. When they tried to move the body, her grandfather jumped up, awakened from his coma and shared his vision of a white Grizzly bear tearing up his infected wound. He was carried home and recovered.

=== The Stolen Woman ===
This legend is one of many raid legends on the peaceful Hupa people by southern "wild" tribes. The raiders were typically called mining'wiltach' [‘their faces-tattooed’] and were likely to be the Yuki people of Round Valley or the Hayfork Wintu.

Long ago, a woman was kidnapped during a Brush Dance at the Me'dilding village by an extremely handsome man. He took her far away to his bark house, and she soon gave birth to a son. He would take the woman with him when hunting with a magic Jump Dance basket (na'wehch) which instantly killed the deer. Years later, the man set the basket down to pick up a dead deer, so the woman took it and used it on him. By dawn, the man died; the woman retrieved her son and all of his stolen valuables. They traveled home after two days, explaining why there are rich people at Me'dilding.

=== It Was Scratching ===
This legend comes from a popular genre of devil stories that stem from the belief in witchcraft (k'ido: ngxwe). Generally, devils frequent graveyards, peer into houses, and catching people outside alone. They are known to cause "pain" that leads to illness, bad luck or death. Suspicions and accusations of "deviling" were common during this time.

Long ago in harvest season, a group of women camped at a bark hut to gather acorns. Once enough were gathered, the women headed home to get help from the men and left one woman behind with the acorns. On the first night, she heard a noise similar to animal scratching on the hut. In the morning, she saw scratches next to where she was sleeping, indicating that someone was deviling her. That night, she laid a log with a blanket on top of where she slept the previous night and sat beside it. Again, she heard scratches in the middle of the night, and a hand reached in to take the log. The woman sliced his hand off and traveled home in the morning. On her way, she found people mourning the death of the man who was deviling her, so she threw his hand on the body and ousted him.

== Tales ==
=== Coyote and Frog ===
Entertaing and provocative stories like this one were traditionally told by women to be passed from mother to daughter. Because Hupa-Yurok society feared causing insult and feuds, these jokes and stories were told between women while cracking acorns and tending to children, though men would often listen in as well.

Coyote (husband) and Frog (wife) were a married couple, but Coyote disappeared one night for a long time and came back. After a fight with Frog, he left again and Frog found him at a Brush dance. Frog went home to make a dance dress and went to dance beside Coyote. Quickly, Coyote turned his attention to another girl dancing and sat down with her. He asked her to spread her legs, and she exclaimed that the abalone shell would break. Coyote cursed here to hell and recognized her as k'yilk'ye•xe. He beat her to death and galloped back home.
