= David R. Goddard =

American plant physiologist

- Born: January 3, 1908; Carmel-by-the-Sea, California, US
- Died: July 9, 1985 (aged 77)
- Education: University of California, Berkeley
- Known for: contributions to the large-scale production of penicillin, bacitracin and vitamin B2 in World War II
- Father: Pliny Earle Goddard
- Scientific career
- Fields: plant physiology
- Workplaces: University of Rochester; University of Pennsylvania
- Doctoral students: Helen A. Stafford

David Rockwell Goddard (January 3, 1908 – July 9, 1985) was an American plant physiologist.

== Early life and education ==
Goddard was the son of Pliny Earle Goddard, American linguist and ethnologist noted for his extensive documentation of the languages and cultures of the Athabaskan peoples of western North America. He was born in Carmel-by-the-Sea, California, in 1908. He attended the University of California, receiving his bachelor's degree in 1929, a master's degree in 1930, and Ph.D. in 1933.

== Career ==
Goddard was most known for his contributions to the large-scale production of penicillin, bacitracin and vitamin B2 in World War II. His later research showed a relation between the respiratory chains in plants and animals. Goddard was a member of the National Academy of Sciences, the American Philosophical Society, and the American Academy of Arts and Sciences. He taught at the University of Rochester and was the chairman of the Division of Biology and the university provost at the University of Pennsylvania. Goddard was also president of the American Society of Plant Physiologists, the Society of General Physiologists and the Society for the Study and Development of Growth. He was also home secretary for the National Academy of Sciences. The University of Pennsylvania established the David Goddard Laboratories as part of Richards Medical Research Laboratories. The New York Times called Goddard a "leading plant expert".

== Inventions ==
Work that Goddard participated in at, what was then, the Rockefeller Institute, inspired by Leonor Michaelis, in the early 1930s, led indirectly to the discovery of simple methods of permanently modifying the shape of hair by reducing the disulfide bonds in keratin (hair protein). The basic chemistry of this discovery was adapted into the technology known in the hairdressing industry as a cold wave, using chemical derivatives of the reagent, thioglycolic acid, that he identified as suitable for this purpose. Goddard was only interested in the, considerable, scientific implications of this discovery, and refused any suggestion of attempting to patent the process.

== Awards and distinctions ==
- 1942 & 1949 Guggenheim Fellowship
- 1948 THE STEPHEN HALES PRIZE for research of respiration and respiratory enzymes
