= Jack D. Forbes =

American historian (1934–2011)

- Born: Jack Douglas Forbes; January 7, 1934; Long Beach, California, US
- Died: February 23, 2011 (aged 77); Davis, California, US
- Education: University of Southern California
- Spouse: Carolyn L. Johnson
- Children: 2

Jack Douglas Forbes (January 7, 1934 – February 23, 2011) was an American historian, writer, scholar, and political activist, who specialized in Native American issues. He is best known for his role in establishing one of the first Native American studies programs (at University of California Davis). In addition, he was one of the cofounders of D-Q University, a prominently Native American college in Davis, California.

== Life and career ==
Jack D. Forbes was born in 1934 in Long Beach, California, to George Theodore Forbes and Dorothy Hazel Rufener Forbes. Jack was of Powhatan-Renapé and Lenape descent, but was not enrolled in any Native nation. Forbes was raised in neighboring El Monte and Eagle Rock, where he began his writing career at the high school newspaper. He received his bachelor's degree in philosophy from University of Southern California in 1953, going on to a Master's in 1955 and a Ph.D. in History and Anthropology (1959).

In the early 1960s, Forbes became active as an organizer in the Native American movement, which asserted the rights to sovereignty and resisting assimilation into the majority culture. Native Americans on the West Coast were active, gaining national attention with such demonstrations as the occupation of Alcatraz Island. They pushed for better education, and departments of Native American studies to be established at major universities, as well as civil rights. In this same era, various tribes filed land claim suits against the federal government or states over long-contested issues.

Forbes first taught at San Fernando Valley State College and the University of Nevada, Reno. He joined the University of California, Davis in 1969, where he helped found a program in Native American studies, one of the first at a major university. Later he developed this subject as a full department and served as its chairman. With an emphasis on interdisciplinary studies, he explored the confluence of African American and Native American histories, as well as multicultural people of Indian and European ancestry. He extended his work into African American and Latin American history. After gaining professor emeritus status in 1994, Forbes continued to teach at the university until 2009.

In 1971 Forbes was among the founders of the Deganawidah-Quetzalcoatl University (commonly referred to as D-Q University), a two-year college located near Davis, California. It was the first tribal college in California and closed for classes in 2005. Forbes taught there for 25 years and served on the board.

In 1981-82 was a visiting Fulbright Professor at the University of Warwick in England, where he also spent time at Oxford and the University of Essex. Additionally, he held the Tinbergen Chair at the Erasmus University of Rotterdam.

In his 1992 book entitled Columbus and Other Cannibals, Forbes wrote that the animism of native and folk religious beliefs of Africa, Asia and the Americas was synonymous with 'life-ism', and that 'perhaps that is what we need, "lifeism", more respect for life, more respect for the living, more respect for all forms of life.'

In the early 1990s, Forbes was involved with David Risling and others in the making of A Free People, Free To Choose, a film by Jan Crull, Jr. It was conceived as a feature-length documentary based on D-Q University's history and an alleged campaign by the federal government to suppress it. Crull was forced to abandon the project when Morrison & Foerster, a law firm closely linked to D-Q U's legal battles, withdrew from the project after the film's subjects filed lawsuits against each other. The hundred-plus hours of footage assembled includes a lengthy interview with Forbes.

Near his retirement, Forbes published Africans and Native Americans: The Language of Race and the Evolution of Red-Black Peoples (1993), considered to be "his signature work," the product of two decades of study. He studied the fluidity of race in the United States as people came together in colonial times and after the Revolution, remarking on the fact that Native Americans who were part black often lost their culture and were classified arbitrarily as black, despite identifying as Indian.

== Marriage and family ==
Forbes married and had two children, Kenneth Forbes and Nancy (Forbes) O'Hearn. After he and his wife divorced, he later married again. His second wife Carolyn Forbes, children, and grandson survived him.

== Awards and honors ==
- Before Columbus Foundation: American Book Award for Lifetime Achievement (1997)
- Wordcraft Circle: Writer of the Year (Prose - Non-Fiction) award (1999)
- 2009 Lifetime Achievement Award, Native Writers' Circle of the Americas

== Selected works ==
- Columbus and Other Cannibals, Seven Stories Press (1978, 2008) ISBN 1-58322-781-4
- The American Discovery of Europe, University of Illinois Press (2007) ISBN 0-252-03152-0
- Apache, Navaho and Spaniard, University of Oklahoma Press (1994) ISBN 0-8061-2686-8
- Africans and Native Americans: : The Language of Race and the Evolution of Red- Black Peoples, University of Illinois Press (1993) ISBN 0-252-06321-X

=== Fiction ===
- Red Blood (Novel), Theytus Press (1997) ISBN 0-919441-65-3
- Only Approved Indians: Stories, University of Oklahoma Press (1995) ISBN 0-8061-2699-X

== See also ==
- Tribal colleges and universities
