= Hoopla =

Hoopla may refer to:

== Arts ==
- Hoop-La (1933), a film starring Clara Bow
- Houp La! (1916), a musical comedy
- Hoopla (album), a 1999 album by the rapper Speech
- Hoopla!, former name of Malthouse Theatre, a Melbourne theatre company

== Other uses ==
- Hoopla (digital media service), a digital media service provided to public libraries
- The Hoopla, an Australian news and opinion website
- Hoopla, a funfair version of the ring-tossing game garden quoits
- Miles Hoopla, a cancelled Second World War bomber aircraft

== See also ==
- Hupla language, a Papuan language
- Hoopa (disambiguation)
