= Pliny Earle Goddard =

American linguist and ethnologist

- Born: November 24, 1869; Lewiston, Maine, U.S.
- Died: July 12, 1928 (aged 58)
- Education: Earlham College (A.B., M.A.); University of California, Berkeley (Ph.D.)
- Occupations: Linguist; ethnologist

Pliny Earle Goddard (November 24, 1869 – July 12, 1928) was an American linguist and ethnologist noted for his extensive documentation of the languages and cultures of the Athabaskan peoples of western North America. His early research, carried out under the auspices of the University of California, Berkeley, focused on the Hupa and adjacent Athabaskan groups in northwestern California. After moving to New York in 1909 at the invitation of Franz Boas his scope expanded to include the Athabaskans of the Southwest, Canada, and Alaska. During the 1910s and 1920s, as Boas's junior colleague at the American Museum of Natural History and Columbia University, Goddard played a major role in creating the academic infrastructure for American Indian linguistics and anthropology in North America.

== Life and works ==
=== The California years ===
Goddard was born in Lewiston, Maine, on November 24, 1869, into a Quaker family of modest means. He attended Earlham College in Richmond, Indiana (A.B. 1892, M.A. 1896), where he studied classics. Between 1892 and 1896 he taught Latin in secondary schools in Indiana and Kansas, but the hard economic times of the mid-1890s led him to accept a position as an interdenominational missionary to the Hupa of northwestern California. Finding it necessary to learn enough of the Hupa language to communicate with his flock, Goddard soon became engrossed in analyzing a linguistic system radically different from any he had previously studied. In 1900 he resigned from his missionary post and began graduate study at Berkeley. The following year he was given an Assistantship in the university's newly formed Anthropology department, joining Alfred L. Kroeber, who had been hired to administer the fledgeling program.

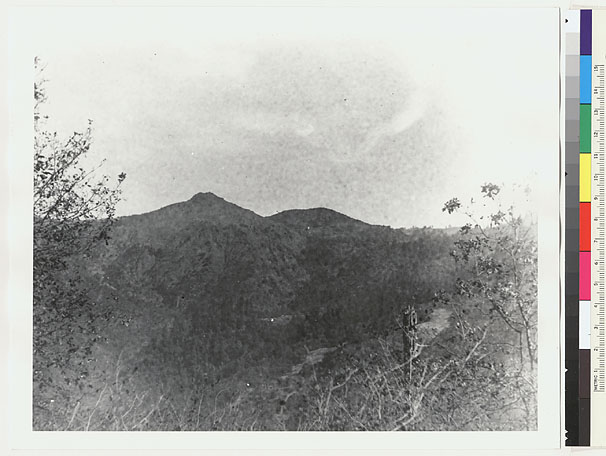
Photograph by Goddard of Black Rock in Mendocino County, California

Goddard was awarded a PhD in 1904 for a detailed grammatical study of Hupa, the first doctorate in anthropological linguistics granted by any American university. He was promoted to assistant professor in 1906 and had responsibility for much of the undergraduate instruction in anthropology and linguistics offered by the university. After finishing his documentation of Hupa, Goddard devoted most of his summers to amassing data on the other surviving varieties of California Athabaskan, traveling hundreds of miles on muleback in search of speakers of such languages as Kato, Wailaki, and Sinkyone. Goddard's preferred technique of working from narrative texts rather than wordlists was in advance of its time, and his notes continue to be of interest.

The most significant source of unpublished Goddard material is his set of notebooks, compiled between 1902 and 1908, that are archived at the American Philosophical Society (APS) in Philadelphia. The notebooks were originally housed at the University of California, Berkeley, but were sent to the APS in the 1940s to become part of that institution's Franz Boas Collection. The notebooks contain interviews with elderly Indians from several tribal groups, including those groups most commonly referred to as the Sinkyone, Mattole, Nongatl, Tolowa, Chilula, Whilkut, Tsnungwe, and Hupa. Much of the material consists of vocabularies and stories, but there are substantial sections containing precise geographical information. Transcriptions of the geographical information have been created by the Cultural Resources Facility, Humboldt State University, Arcata, California. In addition to the APS notebooks relating to California Athabascan Indians, Professor Melville Jacobs of the University of Washington Department of Anthropology received four Goddard notebooks relating to the Lassik tribe.

=== The New York years ===
In 1909 the substantial subvention from Regent Phoebe Apperson Hearst that had supported much of UC's anthropological research during the early years of the century was greatly reduced, and a fierce contest ensued between Kroeber and Goddard for control of the diminished program. When Kroeber emerged victorious, Goddard resigned to take a curatorship in ethnology at the American Museum of Natural History, in New York, engineered for him by Franz Boas. From this position Goddard came to exert wide influence, primarily as a writer on general ethnological topics and as the editor of the American Anthropologist (1915–20). Goddard became a forceful proponent of Boas's views in anthropology and linguistics, in particular of Boas's conservative view of the validity of deep linguistic relationships. In 1917 Boas and Goddard co-founded and edited the International Journal of American Linguistics, which soon became the principal organ of American Indian linguistic scholarship.

=== Dispute with Sapir over Athabaskan tone ===
Goddard continued his Athabaskan linguistic research with trips to the Southwest and to Canada, as well as several return visits to California. This work, however, was increasingly overshadowed by that of Edward Sapir, who had begun his own research on Athabaskan in 1922 with a field study of Sarsi. Sapir's interest in Athabaskan was ultimately grounded in his conviction that the "Na-Dene" relationship that connected Athabaskan, Tlingit, and Haida was part of a much older historical relationship that included Chinese and Tibetan He believed that decisive evidence in support of the "Sino-Dene" hypothesis was his discovery in Sarsi of a tonal system "so fundamental...to the phonetic and morphological understanding of [the language] that it is inconceivable that it should not be shared by the other Athabaskan dialects as well." This claim brought Sapir into direct conflict with Goddard, who had reported no tonal contrasts in California Athabaskan, in Navajo or Apache, or in the three Canadian languages he had studied, Sarcee, Chipewyan, and Beaver. Goddard wisely chose not to dispute the presence of tonal contrasts in the Southwestern and Canadian languages (they are indeed tone languages), but he stood his ground with Hupa, devoting what would be his last published paper (1928) to a close examination of mechanical tracings of Hupa speech, none of which showed evidence of regular differences in pitch. By this time, however, Sapir had had ample opportunity to hear Hupa himself, and for his graduate student Li Fang-Kuei, a native speaker of Mandarin, to hear two other California Athabaskan languages, and to observe their complete lack of tonal contrasts. Goddard apparently did not see Sapir's concession before dying quite suddenly on July 12, 1928 during the heat of a New York summer, at the age of 59.

=== Personal life ===
One of Goddard's sons, David R. Goddard (1908–1985), also attended UC Berkeley, where he studied botany. He went on to have a distinguished academic career as a plant physiologist and geneticist. He was nominated to the National Academy of Science and served as Provost of the University of Pennsylvania.

In the early 1920s Goddard left his wife and children and began a relationship with Gladys A. Reichard (1893–1955), which continued until his death. Although the couple lived together openly, the relationship was as much an intellectual partnership as it was a romantic one. Reichard accompanied Goddard during his field trips to the Southwest and California and began her long-term research on Navajo under his tutelage.

=== Personality ===
A. L. Kroeber wrote of Goddard:

Where an issue concerned chiefly himself, a sense of futility seemed often to invade him: he became half-hearted, non-resistant, sometimes pacifistically resigned. He needed a cause to bring out his best; in a cause, his eye lit up, the steel in him flashed, and he rejoiced in the cleanness of combat. All his life he was a hero-worshipper: and he threw into the worship a quality of heroism of his own, as well as endless devotion. There flowed in him in these qualities much of his ancestral Quakerism, of which even external mannerisms persisted as symbols long after he had given up its formal tenets. Essentially he remained a Quaker to the end—idealist, devotee of the simple in humanity and the direct in relations, martyr if necessary. His habits were consistent. He was personally frugal to abstemiousness, fond of the homespun in speech and manner, distrustful of all incitements from the outer world, little susceptible to the esthetic forms of emotion, but sensitively responsive to the emotions of living beings. Often almost shy in casual company or official relation, he was frankness itself in the contact of man to man, and then not only at ease but overflowing with playfulness and quite unusual charm. His wit was pungent to bitingness; his fundamental humility unwavering and unabashed; his friendships were loyalties.

== Major publications ==
- Life and Culture of the Hupa (UC-PAAE 1, 1-88, 1903)
- Hupa Texts (UC-PAAE 1, 89-364, 1904)
- The Morphology of the Hupa Language (UC-PAAE 3, 1905)
- Kato Texts (UC-PAAE 5, 65-238, 1909)
- Athapascan (Hupa). In Handbook of American Indian Languages, Part 1, Franz Boas. ed. BAE Bulletin 40, Part 1, 85–158, 1911)
- Jicarilla Apache Texts (1911)
- Elements of the Kato Language (UC-PAAE 11, 1–176, 1912)
- Chipewyan Texts and Analysis of the Cold Lake Dialect, Chipewyan (1912)
- Indians of the Southwest (1913 and subsequent editions)
- The present condition of our knowledge of North American languages. American Anthropologist 16, 555-592 (1914)
- Notes on the Chilula Indians of Northwestern California and Chilula Texts (UCPAAE 10, 265–379, 1914)
- The Beaver Indians, Beaver Texts, and The Beaver Dialect (1916–17)
- San Carlos Apache Texts (1919)
- White Mountain Apache Texts (1920)
- Indians of the Northwest Coast (1924 and subsequent editions)
- Pitch Accent in Hupa (UC-PAAE 23, 333–338, 1928)
- The Bear River Dialect of Athabascan (UC-PAAE 24, 291–334, 1929)
- Goddard, Pliny Earle (1905). "The Morphology of the Hupa Language". Berkeley, The University press.
- Goddard, Pliny Earle; Alanson Skinner; Wilson Dallam Wallis (1919). Notes on the sun dance of the Sarsi. The Trustees.
- Goddard, Pliny Earle (1907). "The Phonology of the Hupa Language". University of California Publications.
- Goddard, Pliny Earle (1919). San Carlos Apache texts. American Museum of Natural History.
- Goddard, Pliny Earle (1920). White Mountain Apache texts. The Trustees.
