= Jan Crull Jr. =

American filmmaker

Jan Crull Jr. is a Native American rights advocate, attorney, and filmmaker.

== Involvement with Native American matters ==
From 1979 to the beginning of 1981, Jan Crull Jr. was a volunteer on the Ramah Navajo Indian Reservation in New Mexico where he made many contributions to the well-being of the Ramah Navajos. Although a volunteer, a title - Assistant to the President and the Chapter (the reservation's local government) - was conferred upon him by a community vote already in mid August 1979.

His securing Federal legislation Public Law 96-333 was a major accomplishment for it provided the Ramah Navajos with a legal right to lands that they had been living on for generations and which made the people living on the lands in question eligible for the services and benefits provided by Federal government agencies and departments. The legislation had had a turbulent nineteen-year history because of disputes regarding it within the New Mexican Congressional delegation, the Committee on Interior and Insular Affairs of the U.S. House of Representatives, and local Navajo and Navajo Nation politics and between all of them because of its ties to railroad right-of-ways to the Starlake Coal Fields. While others, including U.S. senators and lawyers from leading Washington, D.C.firms, had been unsuccessful in seeking Congressional action on this matter, Crull had succeeded. In obtaining it, he also taught the Ramah Navajo how to succeed in obtaining all mineral rights underlying the lands he had secured for them with Public Law 97-434 .

Crull's work for the Ramah Navajos led to his nomination for the Rockefeller Public Service Award in 1981. His nomination was endorsed by U.S. Senators and U.S. Congressman who had worked with him to secure passage through both houses of the U.S. Congress, specifically Dennis DeConcini, Pete Domenici, Manuel Lujan Jr., John Melcher, and Paul Simon.

In the early 1980s, Jan Crull Jr. served as a professional staffer with the U. S. House of Representatives' Subcommittee on Postsecondary Education then chaired by Paul Simon. Crull was responsible for developing legislation reauthorizing the Tribal College Act(The Tribally Controlled Community College Assistance Act ), creating special provisions for Native Americans in the Library Services Construction Act , and other matters related to Indian education. Sensing the negative impact of what would subsequently be called Reaganomics on Indian education and especially the Tribal Colleges, he called for a meeting of all tribal college presidents and other Indian leaders on the afternoon of July 21, 1981 at the now defunct American Indian Bank in Washington, D.C. There he proposed the creation of an American Indian College Fund akin to the United Negro College Fund and having the U.S. government provide matching funds to a level determined by the U.S. Congress. This "matching idea" was based on the reworking of the old Allen Bill language and incorporating it in the reauthorization legislation for the tribal colleges.

== Attorney, investment banker and other career activities ==
In addition to his involvement with Amerindians, Crull's career path has taken him to teaching at all levels; administering at a top-ranked American public high school; from defending juveniles accused of felonies while in law school to negotiating international business deals with their attending multi layered contracts; and from achieving overviews of corporate matters globally to marketeering in an assortment of locations worldwide. His first light and learning in the investment field came when he interned at Dillon Read and GGvA in the early 1970s and they were enhanced as he gained expertise over the years with his stays with private investment houses/sovereign funds in Geneva, Vienna and Berlin. His clients have ranged from global manufacturers to, for example, the government of India. He also has served in capacities involving infrastructure development in emerging nations. Although his name has surfaced in various international periodicals and newspapers, his only in depth interview appeared in a trade publication almost two decades ago wherein he warned U.S. manufacturers to examine their trade associations' charters to see if international services were mandated; and if they were, to see to it that they were carried out.

== Filmmaker ==
In the early 1970s, Crull attempted to develop a film about Dutch/U.S. relations regarding West New Guinea in 1962, titled What About My Friend's Children . Because two of the three key figures were already deceased and the third one stymied him, he pieced together a short film that was only an outline of the original. Not in Fiction Only: There and Here Also was shown half completed. Both projects had Crull being mentored by Joris Ivens even though he, himself, could not devote much time to Crull's endeavors since he was busily engaged with other film work in China. AIDDS: American Indians' Devastating Dilemma Soon , To Mute Them Once Again , and Indian Buckaroos were short films, originally meant to be feature length which Crull released under the Vigil Film Production Company banner in the early 1990s. While he had been doing them, among other things, his goal was to develop a feature-length documentary film A Free People, Free To Choose. After over one hundred hours of preliminary footage was shot or compiled, the film's subjects got involved in a lawsuit with one another (which had nothing to do with Crull) and the project fell apart although a part of it was salvaged and has been viewed. Erik Barnouw and Malcolm Mackenzie Ross served as Crull's mentors on this project. Crull also had his brush with feature films: David Lean's Ryan's Daughter; John Trent's Sunday in the Country; and Alan Bridges' Age of Innocence.

== Education and family background ==
Crull was born in the Netherlands to Nederland's Patriciaat families. He became a naturalized American citizen.

After receiving his diploma from Lake Forest Academy, Crull attended Canada's Dalhousie University is where he received his B.A. Honours; the University of Chicago awarded him the A.M. degree; and Tulane University of Louisiana is where he obtained his J.D.

== See also ==
- D-Q University
- Jack D. Forbes
- Stephen Douglas Johnson
- David Risling
