= USS Hupa =

Patrol vessel of the United States Navy

History

United States
- Name: USS Hupa
- Namesake: Previous name retained
- Builder: George Lawley & Son, Neponset, Massachusetts
- Completed: 1905
- Acquired: June 1917
- Commissioned: 10 July 1917
- Stricken: 25 October 1919
- Fate: Sold 12 March 1920
- Notes: Operated as private motorboat Hupa 1905-1917

General characteristics
- Type: Patrol vessel
- Tonnage: 5 gross register tons
- Length: 63 ft (19 m)
- Beam: 8 ft (2.4 m)
- Draft: 3 ft (0.91 m)
- Speed: 25 knots

USS Hupa (SP-650) was a United States Navy patrol vessel in commission from 1917 to 1919.

Hupa was built as a private motorboat of the same name by George Lawley & Son at Neponset, Massachusetts, in 1905. In June 1917, the U.S. Navy acquired her from her owner, L. T. Carey of Boston, Massachusetts, for use as a section patrol boat during World War I. She was commissioned as USS Hupa (SP-650) at Boston on 10 July 1917.

Assigned to the 1st Naval District in northern New England, and based at Provincetown, Massachusetts, Hupa served on patrol duties in Cape Cod Bay and on the Cape Cod Canal.

Hupa was stricken from the Navy List on 25 October 1919 and offered for sale. She finally was sold to the Hyde Engineering Works of Montreal, Quebec, Canada, on 12 March 1920.
