= David Risling =

David Risling Jr. (April 10, 1921 in Morek, Humboldt County, California – March 13, 2005 in Davis, California) was a Native American (Hoopa) educator and rights activist who was often referred to as "The Father of Indian Education".

== Life and achievements ==
After serving in the Navy during World War II, he attended Cal Poly in San Luis Obispo where he earned a degree in vocational agriculture. From 1950 to 1970, he taught agriculture at Modesto Junior College. His increasing involvement in activist causes prompted him to move to UC Davis in 1970, where he helped to develop its Native American studies program. He remained there until his retirement in 1993, when the program became a full-fledged department and is currently one of only three such departments offering doctoral degrees.

He was a co-founder of California Indian Legal Services and the Native American Rights Fund and was involved in securing passage of the federal Indian Education and Indian Tribal Community College acts. Thirty-one Indian community colleges and dozens of K-12 reservation school programs resulted from this legislation. He was also a major consultant in the creation of the Smithsonian's National Museum of the American Indian and was a three-time appointee to the National Advisory Council on Indian Education

== D-Q University ==
The achievement he was reportedly most proud of was his role in creating D-Q University, one of the first six tribal colleges and the only one in California.

Jack D. Forbes (a co-founder of the University) has said, "It was a dream that the late Carl Gorman and I had worked on from 1961-1962, but it was Dave's organizing skill and patience that came to the fore in 1971 when DQU finally acquired flesh and bones."

For many years, Risling served as President of DQU's board of trustees. Only two months before his death, he participated in the decision to close the University, which had lost its accreditation.

For about three years in the early 1990s, Risling, Jack D. Forbes, Morrison & Foerster and many others collaborated with filmmaker Jan Crull, Jr. to make a film about the controversy surrounding D-Q University and its turbulent relationship with the U.S. government. The media had labelled this school as being "controversial" for years and as one of the American Indian Movement's "centers". Crull had been drawn to the D-Q U story from the time that he was a professional Hill staffer responsible for the shaping of a U.S. House hearing on legislation that D-Q U was seeking in 1981. He and the Rislings had developed a rapport over the years since which ultimately led to the A Free People, Free To Choose film project. Well over a hundred hours of footage had been shot when a schism between some of the film's subjects erupted into becoming litigation. Morrison & Foerster was the first sponsor to withdraw from the project and eventually Crull had to scrap it even though distribution for a completed film was already in place.

== See also ==
- Tribal colleges and universities
