= Lewis Knudson =

American botanist

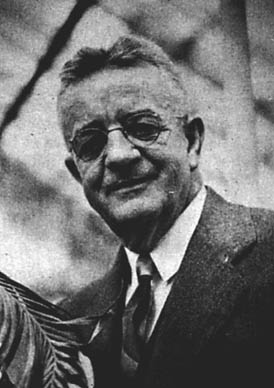
- Born: October 15, 1884; Milwaukee, Wisconsin, United States
- Died: August 31, 1958 (aged 73); Ithaca, New York, United States
- Education: University of Missouri (BSA); Cornell University (PhD)
- Known for: Development of growth medium for aseptic, nonsymbiotic germination of orchid seeds.
- Awards: Fellow of the American Association for the Advancement of Science
- Scientific career
- Fields: Botany
- Workplaces: Cornell University
- Doctoral advisor: Benjamin Minge Duggar

Lewis Knudson (1884–1958) was an American botanist who dedicated most of his professional life to the study of the biology, reproduction and propagation of orchids.

He obtained his Bachelor of Science and Arts degree at the University of Missouri in 1908 and came to Cornell University as an assistant in plant physiology. Here he earned his doctorate, was appointed assistant professor of plant physiology in 1911 and was made acting head of that department in 1912. In 1916, his department became incorporated into the department of botany and he became a professor of botany. In 1941 he was named the head of this department. He retired in 1952.

Orchid seeds are extremely small and hold scant sustenance. For this reason, in nature they need to associate with a fungus during germination which provides them nutrients required for growth and development. This process is known as "symbiotic germination" and until 1922 was the only known method of seed based propagation of orchids. That year, Lewis Knudson published an article describing an artificial method to germinate orchids without the participation of a fungus. This method, known as asymbiotic propagation, makes use of micropropagation techniques to achieve the germination and development of plantules in an artificial culture medium under sterile conditions. Currently, the growth medium known as "Knudson culture medium" continues being used around the world to germinate orchids fast and efficiently. Knudson originally published his work on asymbiotic germination in a Spanish-language journal which was little known at the time; and he thus republished the next year in English in a journal with wide circulation.

== Selected publications ==
- Knudson L. 1921. La germinación no simbiótica de las semillas de orquídeas. Boletin de la Real Sociedad Española de Historia Natural 21: 250-260
- Knudson L. 1922. Nonsymbiotic germination of orchid seeds. Botanical Gazette 73: 1-25
- Knudson L. 1929. Physiological investigations on orchid seed germination. Proc. of the International Congress of Plant Science 2: 1183-1189
- Knudson L. 1951. Nutrient Solutions for Orchids. Botanical Gazette, Vol. 112, No. 4, pp. 528–532
- Knudson L. 1956. Self pollination in Cattleya aurantiaca (Batem.) P. N. Don. Am. Orchid Soc. Bull. 25: 528-532

== Eponyms ==
- (Rosaceae) Prunus × knudsonii Rosend. & Butters
