= D–Q University =

Two-year college in Davis, California, U.S.

Deganawidah-Quetzalcoatl University
- Active: 1971–2005
- Affiliations: American Indian Higher Education Consortium
- Location: Davis, California, United States; 38.567093°N 121.886959°W
- Campus: Rural
- Website: www.d-q-u.org

Deganawidah-Quetzalcoatl University or D–Q University was a two-year college located on Road 31 in Yolo County, 6.7 miles (10.8 km) west of State Route 113 in California. Founded in 1971, it was among the first six tribal colleges and universities (TCUs) in the United States, and the first established in California. It was not affiliated with a single federally recognized tribe or reservation, as are numerous other tribal colleges.

The school ended its full-time class schedule in 2005 due to loss of accreditation. The Board of Trustees has been enlarged and continues to arrange activities to maintain its non-profit status. Students and instructors who remained on campus have continued to use the campus for classes, gatherings, and ceremonies, with annual powwows held through 2013. Annual Veterans Day powwows have continued to be held through the most recent Veterans Day in 2017.

A satellite campus of D–Q University continues to exist as Kumeyaay Community College.

== Name ==
The school was named by founders as Deganawidah-Quetzalcoatl University, after two Native American leaders of the period before European contact, one from New York and one from Mexico.

== Mission ==
At a time of rising American Indian activism, the college was founded to provide alternative ideas and methods of education to Native American and Chicano students. Among its goals were to preserve and strengthen traditional Native American values, practice and protect Native American religion and beliefs, establish a Native American Research Institute, develop field-based systems to provide education to Native Americans who could not attend classes at the campus, and maintain social and personal support systems for D-Q students and staff.

== History ==
Founded in 1971, D-Q was the only college in California founded by and for Native Americans. The school was one of the first six tribal colleges and universities in the United States, all of which were founded between 1968 and 1972. It was the only one that was independent of a reservation. Those six colleges created the American Indian Higher Education Consortium in 1972. In the 21st century, the U.S. Department of Education recognizes 34 tribal colleges, the majority of which are two-year institutions located on reservations. They now enroll more than 30,000 students, and some institutions have formal agreements with four-year universities to enable students to pursue BA degrees.

The site of D-Q was previously used as a United States Army communications facility, known at various times as the Sacramento Valley Radio Transmitting Station; West Coast Relay and Transmitter Station; U.S. Army West Coast Relay and Radio Transmitting Station; and the U.S. Army Strategic Communications Command - CONUS, Davis California, Facility. The site was also used at one time by the Department of the Army, Signal Corps, to support the Signal Corps Radio Station WVY. The late 1960s and early 1970s saw Native American groups 'occupying' federal lands, including the occupation of Alcatraz Island, as a form of protest, and the US Army high frequency transmit and control site near Davis was no exception. Conveniently for all parties, the US Army radio transmitter & control site mostly deactivated and operating in a caretaker status, as part of a military-wide reorganization of high frequency radio facilities (similar high-power Army HF radio stations in Kansas and the Washington DC area also had shut down), so while the occupation may have provided a slight nuisance, the Army chose not to attempt to forcibly repel the occupiers, like they certainly would have been obligated to if the site was still performing an important mission and with expensive, classified materials stored on-site. As-of 2005, numerous items on the D-Q campus—such as chairs, tables, etc. still had US Army property markings, and the surrounding open fields (the former HF radio "antenna farm") still had 1.5" thick, armored coax-cables that used to connect the antennas with the transmitters buried in the soil, and graffiti from the early 1970s occupation was extant in some buildings.

A group of Native American academics, including David Risling, Jack D. Forbes, Carl Gorman, Kenneth Martin, and Sarah Hutchison, all of whom were involved in the Native American Studies Department at UC Davis, created a board of trustees to apply for use of the site after the federal government decommissioned the site for military use. The University of California had also applied to use the site: for its new Native American Studies program, established in 1969, and a primate research lab. Organizers protested and UC Davis withdrew its application. The federal government conditionally granted the land to D–Q University in 1971.

The school opened in 1971, founded to serve both Native American and Latino students. It obtained accreditation in 1977. Most tribal colleges are affiliated with one federally recognized tribe and are generally located on reservations. Organizers of the college were drawn from Native American activists, many of whom were members of federally recognized tribes in California. They struggled to attract funding and faculty to set up and operate the college, at a time when mainstream universities were also recruiting Native Americans to new programs of studies.

== Loss of accreditation, 2005 ==
With competition from the growth of Native American programs at other universities, as well as numerous tribal colleges, in the early 21st century D-Q suffered declining enrollment, a high rate of board of trustees turnover, and problems with funding. In 2003–2004, it lost funding from the Bureau of Indian Affairs because of insufficient Native American enrollment as well as money from the Department of Education. It lost its accreditation in 2005 and stopped offering classes. Disputes among the board of trustees were settled following a lawsuit. The university re-opened for some activities later that year, but the board dismissed the president in June 2006 due to continued lack of students and funds.

Elders and teachers continued to occupy the university grounds through much of 2008, despite Board and police pressures to vacate the land. During several instances in 2008, students and supporters were arrested for occupying the grounds. The school's community continued to host community events, such as powwows.

D–Q University in September 2010, in conjunction with the Regenerative Design Institute hosted a Permaculture Design Course. Native Americans and non-Natives collaborated on site development proposals for the campus.

Annual powwows have been held through 2013, with representation from tribes across California, as well as from other parts of the United States and other nations. As of 2015, the Board of trustees has been enlarged from four to 14 members (recruitment continues for four positions), increasing the number with professional backgrounds. Members represent numerous tribes in California as well as people from outside the state. Among the committees formed is one for curriculum, with a broad-based effort to assess current needs of Native Americans in California. The Board has arranged for seminars and other activities to retain the university's non-profit status, while working to improve its infrastructure and build a network of support in 2015 to re-open. In 2012 the Board signed a memorandum of agreement with the Inter-Tribal Council of California toward this goal.

== Representation in other media ==
In the early 1990s, D–Q University was to be the subject of a feature-length documentary film, A Free People, Free To Choose. Jan Crull, Jr., the filmmaker, was interested in the college's history. He stopped the project when Morrison & Foerster, a law firm closely linked to D-Q U's legal battles, withdrew after some of the film's subjects became involved in mutual lawsuits. He had already shot more than 100 hours of footage, including interviews with founders and activists David Risling and Jack D. Forbes.
