= Hoopa Valley =

Valley in California, United States

Coordinates: 41.06434°N 123.68271°W

Hoopa Valley (Tolowa: Xee-stin’) is a valley on the lower course of the Trinity River between the confluence of South Fork Trinity River and the Klamath River. The valley opens up above the confluence of Campbell Creek with the Trinity River and extends northward until it closes up again at the foot of Bald Hill. The valley is encompassed by the Hoopa Valley Indian Reservation.

== See also ==
Hoopa, California - the name for the town (Unincorporated community) in the Hupa Valley. The name was changed at various times related to the post office.
