= Hupa language =

Athabaskan language of California, US

Hupa
- Na꞉tinixwe Mixine꞉wheʼ
- Native to: United States
- Region: California (Hoopa Valley)
- Ethnicity: 2,000 Hupa (2007)
- Extinct: March 7, 2026, with the death of Verdena Parker
- Revival: L2 users: 30 (2007)
- Language family: Na-Dene: Athabaskan–Eyak; Athabaskan; Pacific Coast Athabaskan; Hupa
- Dialects: Hupa; Tsnungwe; Chilula; Whilkut
- Writing system: Latin script

Language codes
- ISO 639-2: hup
- ISO 639-3: hup
- Glottolog: hupa1239
- ELP: Hupa
- Hupa and other Californian Athabaskan languages

- Hupa is classified as Extinct by the UNESCO Atlas of the World's Languages in Danger.

Hupa (native name: Na꞉tinixwe Mixine꞉wheʼ, lit. 'language of the Hoopa Valley people') is an extinct Athabaskan language (of Na-Dene stock) spoken along the lower course of the Trinity River in Northwestern California by the Hoopa Valley Hupa (Na꞉tinixwe) and Tsnungwe/South Fork Hupa (Tse꞉ningxwe) and, before European contact, by the Chilula and Whilkut peoples, to the west.

== Speakers ==
The 2000 US Census estimated the language to be spoken by 64 persons between the ages of 5 and 17, including 4 monolingual speakers. As of 2024, Verdena Parker was the last native speaker. Perhaps another 50 individuals of all ages have restricted control of traditional Hupa phonology, grammar and lexicon. Beyond this, many tribal members share a small vocabulary of words and phrases of Hupa origin.

== Phonology ==
The consonants of Hupa in the standard orthography are listed below (with IPA notation in slashes):

Hupa consonants
		Labial	Alveolar			Postalveolar		Palatal	Velar		Uvular	Glottal	
		Labial	plain	lateral	sib.	plain	labial.	Palatal	plain	labial.	Uvular	plain	labial.
Nasal		m ⟨m⟩	n ⟨n⟩						ŋ ⟨ng⟩				
Plosive/ Affricate	tenuis	p ⟨b⟩	t ⟨d⟩		ts ⟨dz⟩	tʃ ⟨j⟩		kʲ ⟨g, gy⟩ (Note: The palatal stops ⟨g k kʼ⟩ are written ⟨gy ky kyʼ⟩ before ⟨a o u⟩.)	(k) ⟨G⟩ (Note: The velar stops ⟨G K Kʼ⟩ have a limited distribution; G and K are only found in diminutive words.)		q ⟨q⟩	ʔ ⟨ʼ⟩	
Plosive/ Affricate	aspirated		tʰ ⟨t⟩		tsʰ ⟨ts⟩		tʃʷʰ ⟨chw⟩	kʲʰ ⟨k, ky⟩	(kʰ) ⟨K⟩				
Plosive/ Affricate	ejective		tʼ ⟨tʼ⟩	tɬʼ ⟨tłʼ⟩	tsʼ ⟨tsʼ⟩	tʃʼ ⟨chʼ⟩	(tʃʷʼ) ⟨chwʼ⟩ (Note: /tʃʷʼ/ occurs mainly as a variant pronunciation of /tʃʷʰ/ in some words.)	kʲʼ ⟨kʼ, kyʼ⟩	(kʼ) ⟨Kʼ⟩		qʼ ⟨qʼ⟩		
Fricative				ɬ ⟨ł⟩	s ⟨s⟩	(ʃ) ⟨sh⟩ (Note: /ʃ/ is rare and occurs mainly in exclamations or loanwords.)			x ⟨x⟩	xʷ ⟨xw⟩		h ⟨h⟩	hʷ ⟨wh⟩
Approximant				l ⟨l⟩				j ⟨y⟩		w ⟨w⟩			

Golla 1996 presents the following vowel system:

	Front	Central	Back
Near-close	ɪ ⟨i⟩		
Close-mid			o ⟨o⟩
Open-mid	ɛ ⟨e⟩		ʌ ⟨u⟩
Open			ɑ ⟨a⟩

Vowels ɑ, ɛ and o can be lengthened.

== Orthography ==
The Hupa alphabet is as follows:

Hupa alphabet
Orthography
a	a꞉	b	ch	chʼ	chw	chwʼ	d	dz	e	e꞉	g	gy	h	i	j	k	kʼ	ky	kyʼ	l	ł	m	n	ng	o	o꞉	q	qʼ	s	sh	t	tʼ	tł	tłʼ	ts	tsʼ	u	w	wh	x	xw	y	ʼ
IPA phonemes
a	aː	p	tʃʰ	tʃʼ	tʃʷʰ	tʃʷʼ	t	ts	ɛ	ɛː	k	kʲ	h	ɪ	tʃ	kʰ	kʼ	kʲʰ	kʲʼ	l	ɬ	m	n	ŋ	o	oː	q	qʼ	s	ʃ	tʰ	tʼ	tɬʰ	tɬʼ	tsʰ	tsʼ	ʌ	w	hʷ	χ	χʷ	j	ʔ

== Morphology ==
=== Verb themes and classes ===
As with other Dene languages, the Hupa verb is based around a theme. Melissa Axelrod has defined a theme as "the underlying skeleton of the verb to which prefixes or strings of prefixes or suffixal elements are added in producing an utterance. The theme itself has a meaning and is the basic unit of the Athabaskan verbal lexicon." In addition to a verb stem, a typical theme consists of a classifier, one or more conjunct prefixes, and one or more disjunct prefixes.

According to Victor Golla (1970, 2001 and others), each Hupa theme falls into one of eight structural classes according to its potential for inflection, along the following three parameters: active vs. neuter, transitive vs. intransitive, and personal vs. impersonal.

1. Active themes are inflected for aspect-mode categories, while neuter themes are not.
2. Transitive themes are inflected for direct object, while intransitive themes are not.
3. Personal themes are inflected for subject, while impersonal themes are not.

Golla (2001) presents examples of themes from each of the eight structural classes. Orthography has been changed to conform to the current accepted tribal orthography:

Active themes:

- Transitive

Personal: OBJ-ƚ-me꞉n 'fill OBJ'
Impersonal: no꞉=OBJ-d-(n)-ƚ-tan 'OBJ gets used to something'

- Intransitive

Personal: tsʼi-(w)-la꞉n/lan 'play (at a rough sport)'
Impersonal: (s)-daw 'melt away disappear'

Neuter themes:

- Transitive

Personal: OBJ-si-ƚ-ʼa꞉n 'have (a round object) lying'
Impersonal: OBJ-wi-l-chwe꞉n 'OBJ has been made, created'

- Intransitive

Personal: di-n-chʼa꞉t 'ache, be sick'
Impersonal: kʼi-qots 'there is a crackling sound'

=== Verb template ===
As with other Dene languages, the Hupa verb is composed of a verb stem and a set of prefixes. The prefixes can be divided into a conjunct prefix set and disjunct prefix set. The disjunct prefixes occur on the outer left edge of the verb. The conjunct prefixes occur after the disjunct prefixes, closer to the verb stem. The two types of prefixes can be distinguished by their different phonological behavior. The prefix complex may be subdivided into 10 positions, modeled in the Athabaskanist literature as a template, as follows:

Hupa verb template
11	10	9	8	7	6	5	4	3	2	1	0
ADV	thematic material	PL/aug-thematic	3.SBJ	OBJ	thematic material	ADV	DISTR-thematic	mode-ASP	1.SBJ/2.SBJ	classifier (voice/valency marker)	verb stem

=== Pronouns, pronominal inflection ===
Hupa verbs have pronominal (i.e., pronoun) prefixes that mark both subjects and objects. The prefixes can vary in certain modes, particularly the perfective mode (See e.g., Mode and Aspect for a discussion of modes in Navajo, a related Dene language). The prefixes vary according to person and number. The basic subject prefixes are listed in the table below:

		Subject Prefixes		Object Prefixes	
		Singular	Plural	Singular	Plural
1st person		-wh-	-di-	-wh-	-noh-
2nd person		ni-	-oh-	ni-	-noh-
3rd person	animate	-chʼi-		xo-	
3rd person	obviative	yi-		-Ø-	
3rd person	indefinite	kʼi-		-Ø-	
3rd person	impersonal (areal-situational)	-xo-		-Ø-	
Reflexive		–		ʼa꞉di-	
Reciprocal		–		n- łi	

The subject prefixes occur in two different positions. The first and second subject prefixes (-wh- (or allomorph -e꞉ ), -di-, -ni-, -oh-) occur in position 2, directly before the classifier (voice/valency) prefixes. The animate, obviative, indefinite and "areal-situational" subject prefixes (chʼi-, yi-, kʼi- and xo-) are known as "deictic subject pronouns" and occur in position 8.

The direct object prefixes occur in position 7.

The Hupa free personal subject pronouns are as follows:

	singular	plural
1st person	whe꞉	nehe
2nd person	ning	nohni
3rd person	xong, min (low animacy)	xong

Golla (2001) notes that the 3rd person free pronouns are very rarely used, with demonstrative pronouns being used in their place.

=== Demonstrative pronouns ===
- hay(i) < hay-i 'the one (who)'
- hay-de꞉ < hay-de꞉-i 'the one here' (de꞉ 'here')
- hay-de꞉d < hay-de꞉-d-i 'this one here' (de꞉-di 'this here')
- hay-yo꞉w < hay-yo꞉w-i 'the one there (close)' (yo꞉wi 'there')
- hay-ye꞉w < hay-ye꞉w-i 'the one in the distance' (ye꞉wi 'yonder')

== Bibliography ==
- Axelrod, Melissa (1993). The Semantics of Time: Aspectual Categorizations in Koyukon Athabaskan. Lincoln: University of Nebraska Press. ISBN 0-8032-1032-9. LCCN 92-42719.
- Campbell, Amy (November 23, 2007). Hupa ditransitives and the syntactic status of R (PDF). Conference on Ditransitive Constructions. Leipzig.
- Dixon, Roland Burrage; Barrett, Samuel Alfred; Matthews, Washington; Ray, Bill (1910). The phonology of the Hupa language. The University Press.
- Goddard, Pliny Earle (March 1904). Hupa Texts. American Archaeology and Ethnology. Vol. 1, no. 2. Berkeley: University of California Press. LCCN 05016850.
- Goddard, Pliny Earle (June 1905). The Morphology of the Hupa Language. American Archaeology and Ethnology. Vol. 3. Berkeley: University of California Press. LCCN 15008301.
- Goddard, Pliny Earle (1907). The Phonology of the Hupa Language. American Archaeology and Ethnology. Vol. 5, no. 1. Berkeley: University of California Press. LCCN 07015930.
- Golla, Victor Karl (1970). Hupa Grammar (PDF) (PhD dissertation). Berkeley: University of California. Archived from the original (PDF) on June 29, 2011.
- Golla, Victor (1996). Hupa Language Dictionary (PDF) (2nd ed.). hdl:2148/48.
- Golla, Victor (2011). California Indian Languages. University of California Press. ISBN 978-0-520-26667-4.
- Gordon, Matthew (2001). "Laryngeal Timing and Correspondence in Hupa" (PDF). UCLA Working Papers in Linguistics. 7. Archived from the original (PDF) on March 1, 2022.
- Gordon, Matthew (August 25, 1998). "The Phonetics and Phonology of Non-Modal Vowels: A Cross-Linguistic Perspective" (PDF). Proceedings of the Annual Meeting of the Berkeley Linguistics Society. 24: 93–105. doi:10.3765/bls.v24i1.1246.
- Gordon, Matthew; Luna, Edmundo (June 25, 2004). "An Intergenerational Study of Hupa Stress" (PDF). Proceedings of the Annual Meeting of the Berkeley Linguistics Society. 30. doi:10.3765/bls.v30i1.3426.
- Pycha, Anne. "Morpheme Strength Relationships in Hupa, and Beyond" (PDF). Archived from the original (PDF) on July 8, 2010.
- Sapir, Edward; Golla, Victor (2001). "Hupa Texts, with Notes and Lexicon". In Golla, Victor; O'Neill, Sean (eds.). The Collected Works of Edward Sapir. Vol. 14: Northwest California Linguistics. Mouton de Gruyter. pp. 19–1011. doi:10.1515/9783110879803.
