= Hoopa, California =

- Census-designated place
- Location within California Location within the United States
- Coordinates: 41°03′01″N 123°40′27″W
- Country: United States
- State: California
- County: Humboldt
- Native American Reservation: Hoopa Valley Indian Reservation
- Elevation: 330 ft (100 m)

Population (2020)
  - Total: 3,167
- Time zone: UTC-8 (Pacific)
  - Summer (DST): UTC-7 (PDT)
- ZIP code: 95546
- Area codes: 530, 837
- FIPS code: 06-34540
- GNIS feature ID: 2585654

Hoopa (formerly Hupa, Ho-pah, Hoo-pah, Hupo, and Up-pa) is an unincorporated community and census-designated place (CDP) in Humboldt County, California, United States. It is located 10 miles (16 km) south of Weitchpec, at an elevation of 328 feet (100 m). The ZIP Code is 95546. As of the 2020 census, Hoopa had a population of 3,167.

Hoopa is a rural town located entirely on the federally-designated reservation of the Hupa and serves as the administrative capital of the Hoopa Valley Indian Reservation. Hoopa is on the Trinity River. Hoopa is in area code 530.

The Hoopa Valley post office opened in 1861; the name was changed to Hoopa in 1895, to Hupa in 1900, and back to Hoopa in 1902.

== Climate ==
The climate is similar to that of nearby Willow Creek.

Climate data for Hoopa, California, averages 1997–present, extremes 1997–present
Month	Jan	Feb	Mar	Apr	May	Jun	Jul	Aug	Sep	Oct	Nov	Dec	Year
Record high °F (°C)	71 (22)	77 (25)	87 (31)	96 (36)	105 (41)	109 (43)	113 (45)	111 (44)	110 (43)	96 (36)	80 (27)	69 (21)	113 (45)
Mean maximum °F (°C)	61.7 (16.5)	68.0 (20.0)	78.8 (26.0)	87.0 (30.6)	94.0 (34.4)	100.5 (38.1)	104.5 (40.3)	104.5 (40.3)	101.8 (38.8)	85.9 (29.9)	69.4 (20.8)	59.9 (15.5)	107.3 (41.8)
Mean daily maximum °F (°C)	52.7 (11.5)	57.2 (14.0)	62.3 (16.8)	67.4 (19.7)	74.9 (23.8)	82.2 (27.9)	90.7 (32.6)	90.6 (32.6)	85.6 (29.8)	73.0 (22.8)	58.4 (14.7)	50.7 (10.4)	70.5 (21.4)
Daily mean °F (°C)	44.5 (6.9)	47.8 (8.8)	51.2 (10.7)	55.1 (12.8)	61.0 (16.1)	67.0 (19.4)	73.5 (23.1)	73.1 (22.8)	68.6 (20.3)	59.5 (15.3)	50.6 (10.3)	44.3 (6.8)	58.0 (14.4)
Mean daily minimum °F (°C)	36.8 (2.7)	38.5 (3.6)	40.1 (4.5)	42.8 (6.0)	47.1 (8.4)	51.7 (10.9)	56.4 (13.6)	55.6 (13.1)	51.5 (10.8)	46.1 (7.8)	42.9 (6.1)	37.8 (3.2)	45.6 (7.6)
Mean minimum °F (°C)	31.0 (−0.6)	32.0 (0.0)	33.2 (0.7)	35.5 (1.9)	39.1 (3.9)	43.7 (6.5)	48.7 (9.3)	49.2 (9.6)	44.6 (7.0)	37.1 (2.8)	33.8 (1.0)	30.4 (−0.9)	27.6 (−2.4)
Record low °F (°C)	12 (−11)	19 (−7)	26 (−3)	28 (−2)	30 (−1)	34 (1)	41 (5)	40 (4)	34 (1)	26 (−3)	22 (−6)	7 (−14)	7 (−14)
Source: National Weather Service

== Demographics ==
Historical population
Census	Pop.	Note	%±
2020	3,167		—
U.S. Decennial Census; 1860–1870 1880-1890; 1900 1910 1920; 1930 1940 1950; 1960 1970 1980; 1990 2000 2010; 2020

Hoopa first appeared as a census designated place in the 2020 U.S. census.

=== 2020 census ===
Hoopa CDP, California – Racial and ethnic composition Note: the US Census treats Hispanic/Latino as an ethnic category. This table excludes Latinos from the racial categories and assigns them to a separate category. Hispanics/Latinos may be of any race.
Race / Ethnicity (NH = Non-Hispanic)	Pop 2020	2020
White alone (NH)	260	8.21%
Black or African American alone (NH)	1	0.03%
Native American or Alaska Native alone (NH)	2,600	82.10%
Asian alone (NH)	3	0.09%
Native Hawaiian or Pacific Islander alone (NH)	0	0.00%
Other race alone (NH)	7	0.22%
Mixed race or Multiracial (NH)	166	5.24%
Hispanic or Latino (any race)	130	4.10%
Total	3,167	100.00%

As of the 2020 census, Hoopa had a population of 3,167. The population density was 155.2 inhabitants per square mile (59.9/km^{2}). The racial makeup of Hoopa was 8.4% White, 0.1% African American, 84.6% Native American, 0.1% Asian, 0.0% Pacific Islander, 0.6% from other races, and 6.2% from two or more races. Hispanic or Latino of any race were 4.1% of the population.

The age distribution was 32.0% under the age of 18, 10.3% aged 18 to 24, 25.6% aged 25 to 44, 20.3% aged 45 to 64, and 11.7% who were 65 years of age or older. The median age was 31.4 years. For every 100 females, there were 92.9 males, and for every 100 females age 18 and over, there were 87.7 males age 18 and over.

The census reported that 99.8% of the population lived in households, 0.2% lived in non-institutionalized group quarters, and no one was institutionalized. 0.0% of residents lived in urban areas, while 100.0% lived in rural areas.

There were 995 households, out of which 44.8% included children under the age of 18, 31.8% were married-couple households, 12.9% were cohabiting couple households, 37.0% had a female householder with no partner present, and 18.4% had a male householder with no partner present. 21.7% of households were one person, and 8.2% were one person aged 65 or older. The average household size was 3.18. There were 697 families (70.1% of all households).

There were 1,040 housing units at an average density of 51.0 units per square mile (19.7 units/km^{2}), of which 995 (95.7%) were occupied. Of these, 67.5% were owner-occupied, and 32.5% were occupied by renters. 4.3% of housing units were vacant. The homeowner vacancy rate was 0.0%, and the rental vacancy rate was 2.7%.

=== 2010 census ===
The 2010 census recorded 3,393 people in Hoopa. This figure includes people living in Hoopa Valley outside the town of Hoopa.

=== 2000 census ===
The 2000 U.S. census recorded 3,040 people in Hoopa. The ethnic composure of the area was 14.1% White, 0.1% Black or African American, 81.7% Native American, 0.3% Asian, 0.8% from other races, and 2.9% from two or more races. 4.5% of the population were Hispanic or Latino of any race.

== Politics ==
In the state legislature, Hoopa is in the 2nd senatorial district, represented by Democrat Mike McGuire, and the 2nd Assembly district, represented by Democrat Chris Rogers.

Federally, Hoopa is in California's 2nd congressional district, represented by Democrat Jared Huffman.

In the Hoopa Valley Tribal Council, Hoopa is represented in six of seven council districts.
