= Hupa =

Native American people in California

dining'xine꞉wh / na꞉tinixwe
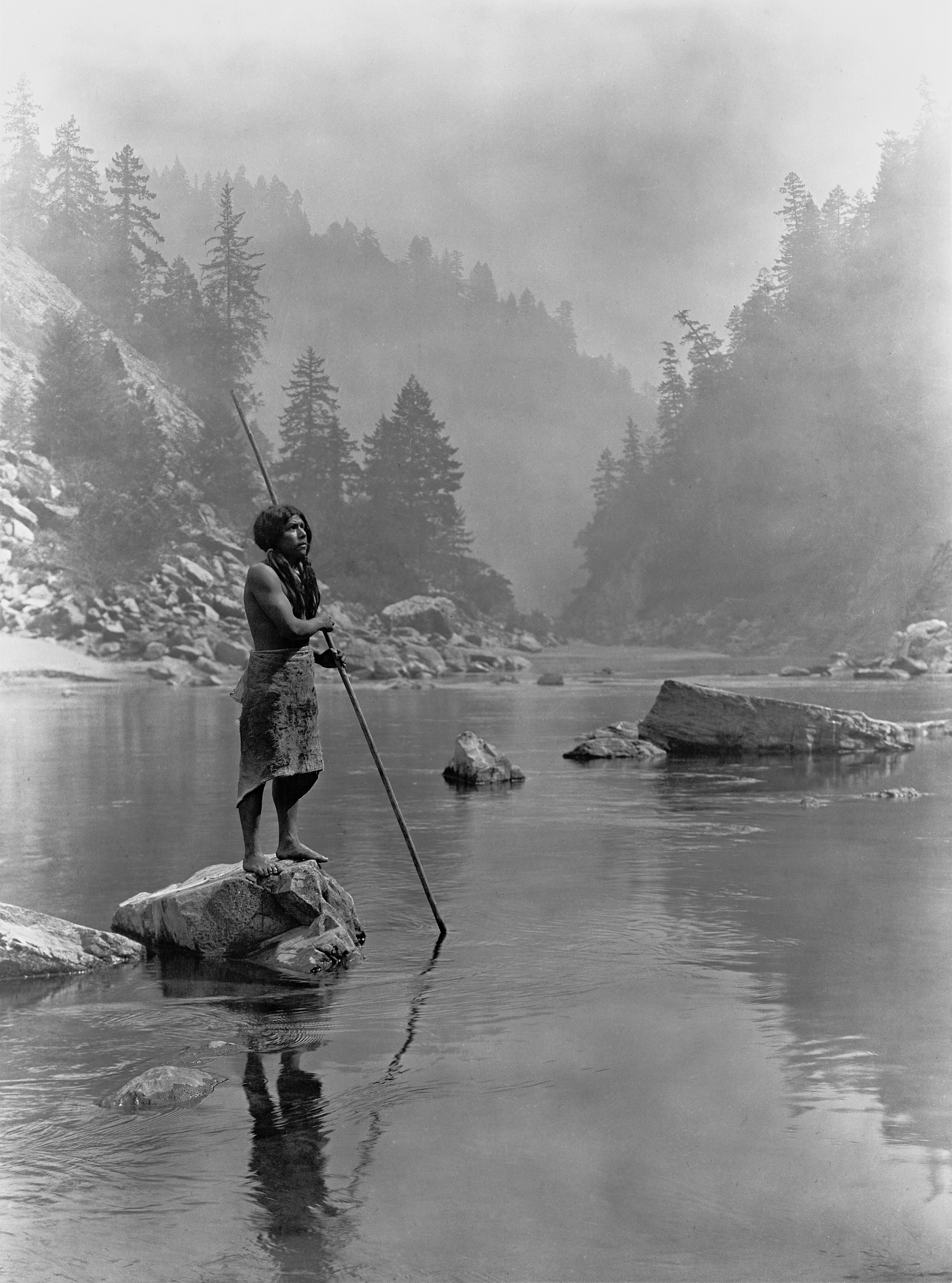
- A Hupa man by Edward S. Curtis, c. 1923

Total population
- 3,139 enrolled (2013)

Regions with significant populations
- United States (California)

Languages
- English, formerly Hupa

Religion
- Hupa traditional beliefs, Christianity

Related ethnic groups
- Chilula and Whilkut

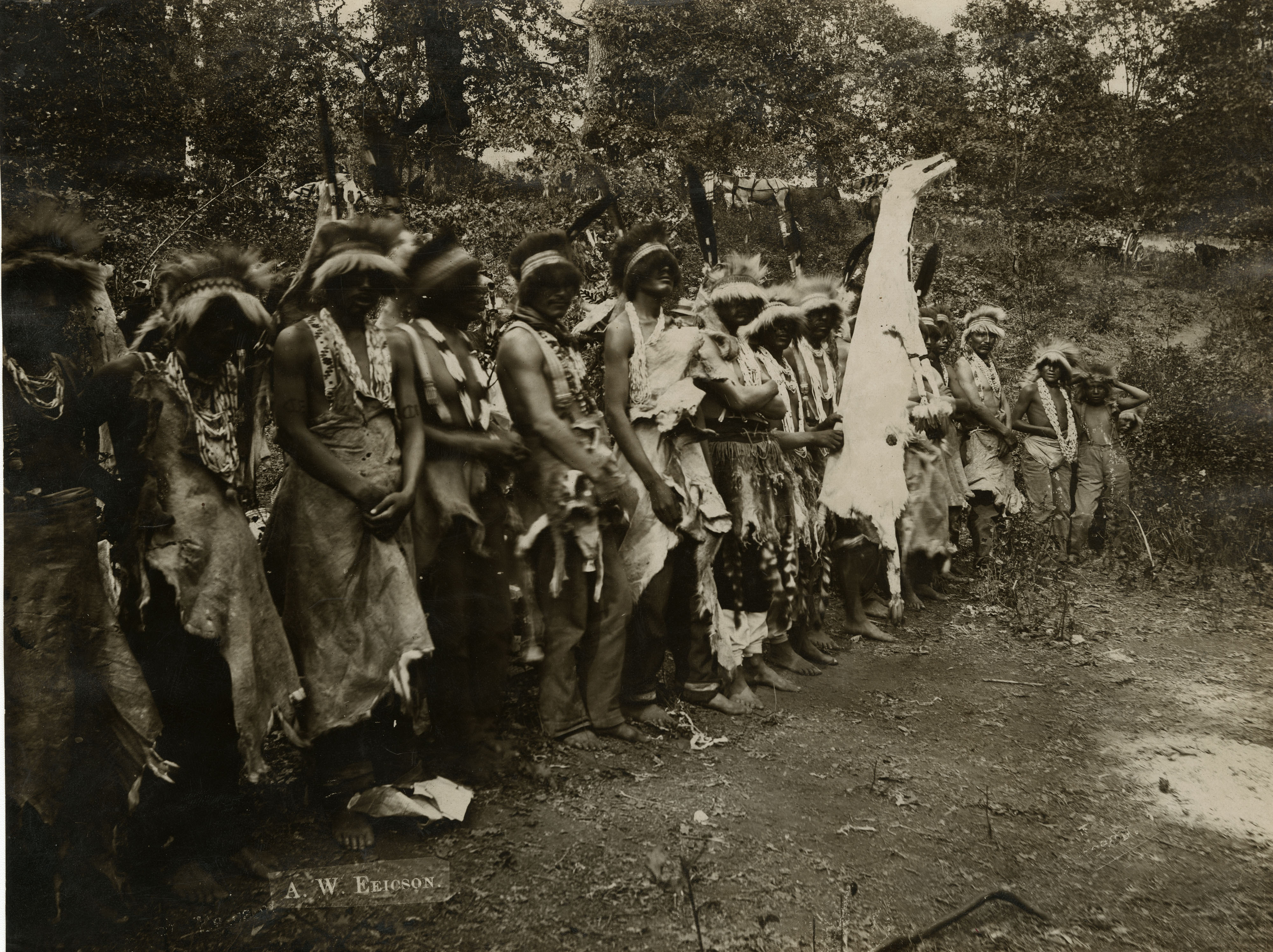
A Hupa white deerskin dance by A.W. Ericson

The Hupa are an Athabaskan-speaking Native American people in northwestern California. Their endonym is dining'xine꞉wh for Hupa language-speakers in general, and na꞉tinixwe for residents of Hoopa Valley. The majority of the tribe is enrolled in the federally recognized Hoopa Valley Tribe of the Hoopa Valley Indian Reservation.

== Name ==
The Hupa call those who speak the Hupa language dining'xine꞉wh, while the modern Hupa who inhabit the Hoopa Valley are known as na꞉tinixwe, also spelled Natinook-wa, meaning "People of the Place Where the Trails Return". The Yurok name for the Hupa is Huepʼoolaʼ / Huepʼoolaa ('Hupa people'). The Karuk name for them is Kishákeevar / Kishakeevra ("Hupa People"), from the toponymic kishákeevar-sav ("Hupa River", i.e. the Trinity River).

== History ==
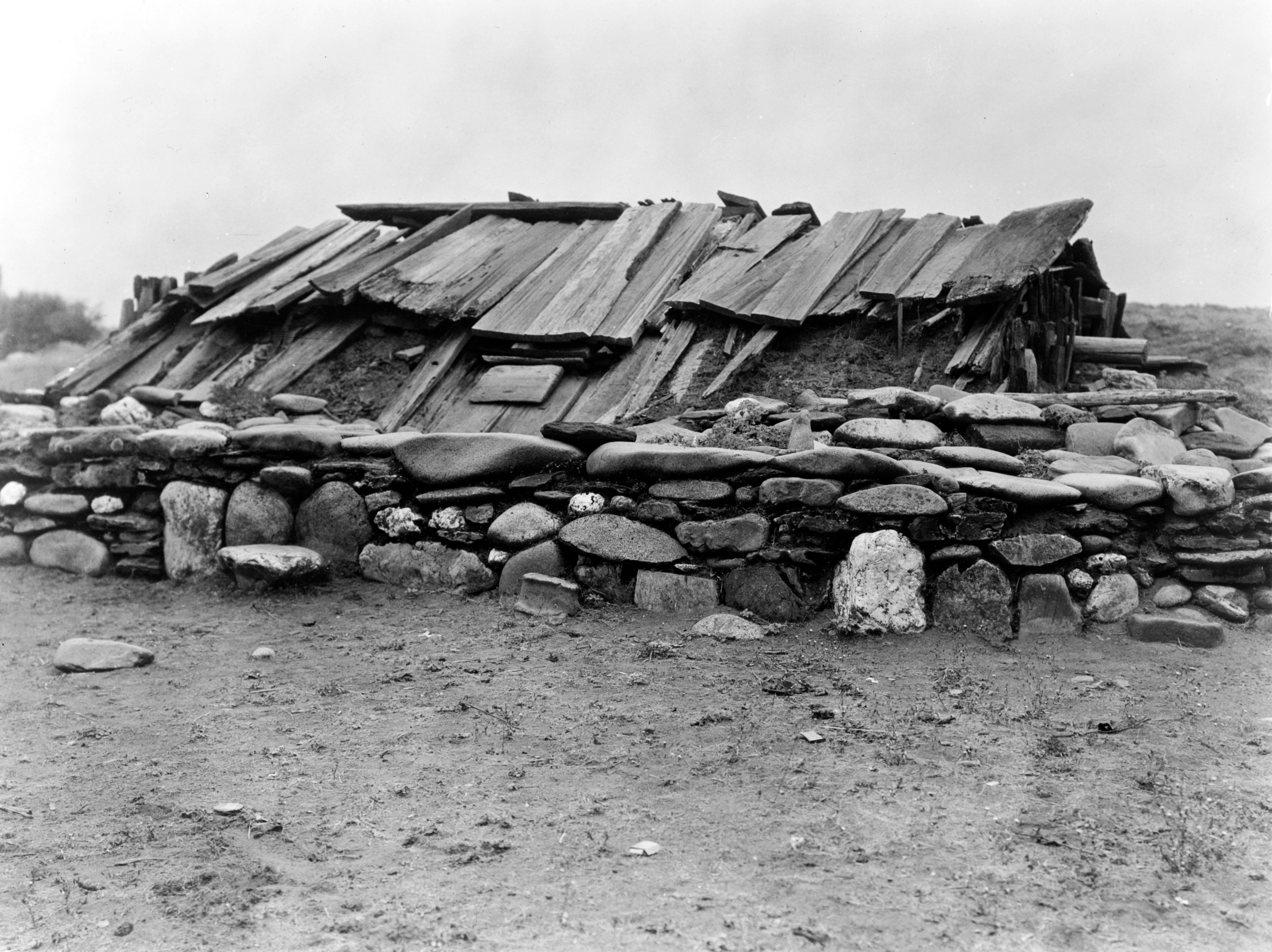
Wood plank and rock Hupa sweat house

Hupa people migrated from the north into northern California around 1000 CE and settled in Hoopa Valley, California (Hupa: na꞉tinix). Their heritage language is Hupa, which is a member of the Athabaskan language family. Their land stretched from the South Fork of the Trinity River to Hoopa Valley, to the Klamath River in California. Their red cedar-planked houses, dugout canoes, basket hats and many elements of their oral literature identify them with their northern origin; however, some of their customs, such as the use of a sweat house for ceremonies and the manufacture of acorn bread, were adopted from surrounding Indigenous peoples of California. Close associated peoples – both by language and custom – were/are the Tsnungwe (South Fork Hupa), the Chilula (Lower Redwood Creek Hupa) and Whilkut (Redwood Creek Hupa).

Hupa people had limited contact with non-Native peoples until the 1849 Gold Rush brought an influx of miners onto their lands. In 1864, the United States government signed a treaty recognizing the Hupa tribe's sovereignty over their land. The United States called the reservation the Hoopa Valley Indian Reservation (located at 41°05′57″N 123°40′21″W), where Hupa people now reside, one of very few California tribes not forced from their homeland. The reservation is next to the territory of the Yurok at the connection of the Klamath and Trinity Rivers in northeastern Humboldt County. The reservation has a land area of 141.087 square miles (365.41 km^{2}).

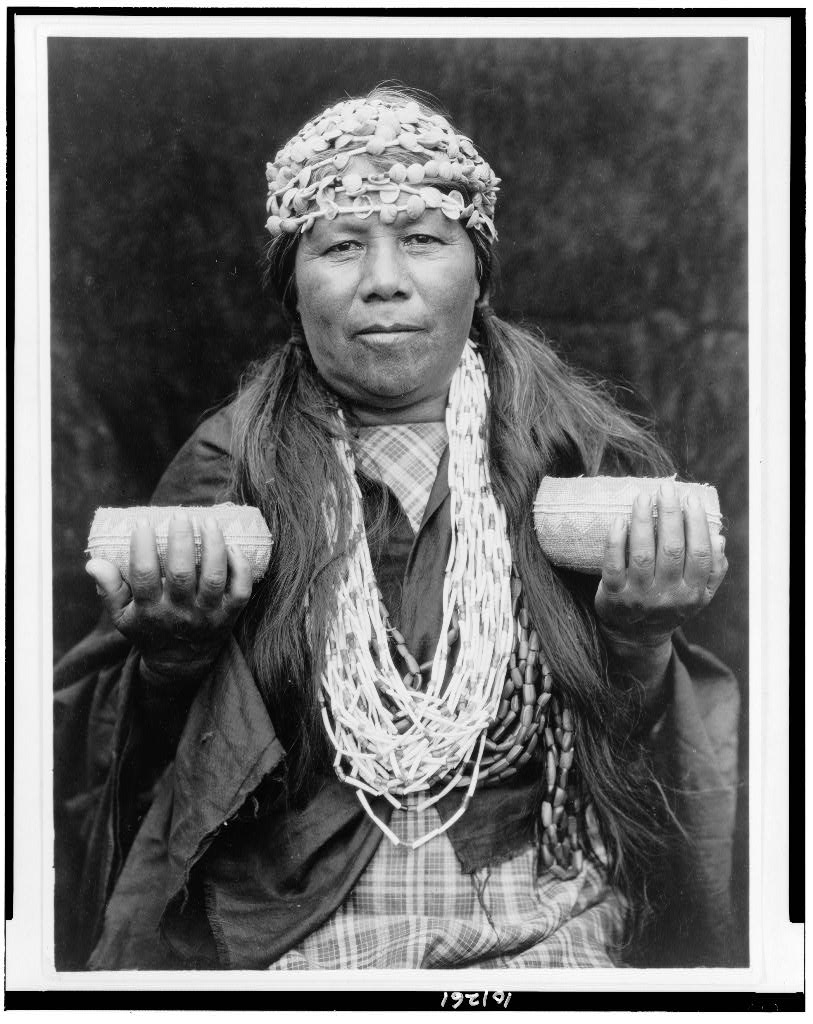
Hupa female shaman, c.1923, Edward Curtis

Hupa are involved in the talks to remove hydroelectric dams along the Klamath and Trinity rivers, and were a party to a lawsuit against the Bureau of Reclamation and the National Marine Fisheries Service. On February 8, 2017, the federal district court judge ruled in favor of the Hoopa Valley Tribe, the three other Klamath River fishing tribes, and other stakeholders. The judge agreed to plans designed by the Tribes' scientists to reduce outbreaks of a deadly fish disease that had infected 90% of juvenile salmon in 2014 and 2015.

== Culture ==
=== Arts ===
Hupa people have been excelling at basketry and elk horn carving and, since the 17th century, petroglyphs.

=== Ethnobotany ===
Traditionally, Hupa people have used the acorns of Notholithocarpus densiflorus to make meal, from which they would make mush, bread, biscuits, pancakes, and cakes. They also roast the acorns and eat them. They also use the dyed fronds of Woodwardia radicans for basketry. They also use Xerophyllum tenax to create a border pattern in baskets.

=== Fishing ===
Hupa, like many tribes in the area, fish for salmon in the Klamath and Trinity rivers. One of the methods they once used to capture fish was the fish weir, which tribal members would maintain. Hupa share all of their fishing practices with the neighboring Yurok Hupa tribal fishers and their families rely on the Spring and Fall Chinook Salmon runs. Acorns, once abundant, were a main staple until they grew scarce. Because Hupa were not located as close to the sea as their neighboring Yurok Tribe, they traded supplies with them, such as salt in exchange for baskets, or acorns for canoes.

== Population ==
Estimates for the pre-contact populations of most Native groups in California have varied substantially. Alfred L. Kroeber thought that the 1770 population of Hupa was 1,000 and that Chilula and Whilkut accounted for another 1,000. Kroeber estimated the population of Hupa in 1910 to be 500. In 1943, Sherburne F. Cook proposed an aboriginal population of 1,000 for Hupa and 600 for Chilula. He subsequently suggested a population for Hupa alone of 2,900. William J. Wallace felt that the latter estimate was "much too high", and allowed 1,000 for Hupa, 500–600 for Chilula, and 500 for Whilkut. The Hoopa Valley Indian Reservation has a resident population of 2,633 persons according to the 2000 census.

Hupa man making fire.

Hupa girl in gala dress.

Hupa man.

== Reservations ==
Map of Hoopa Valley Reservation (In green), Blue Lake Rancheria (In blue), Trinidad Rancheria (In orange) and nearby reservations.

Hupa descendants have since been incorporated mainly into the Hoopa Valley Indian Reservation and other tribes:

- Hoopa Valley Tribe (na꞉tinixwe) (Hoopa, Humboldt County, Population 2013: 3,139) (Hupa, Tsnungwe, Chimalakwe, Chilula, Whilkut)
- Cher-Ae Heights Indian Community of the Trinidad Rancheria (Trinidad, Humboldt County, Population 2011: 154) (Yurok, Wiyot, Tolowa sowie Chetco, Hupa und Karuk)
- Blue Lake Rancheria (yisinchʼin)(Blue Lake, Humboldt County, Population 2010: 58) (Wiyot, Yurok, Hupa, Whilkut)

== See also ==
- Hoopa, California—the name for the town (Unincorporated community) in the Hupa Valley. The name was changed at various times related to the post office.

== Sources ==
- Cook, Sherburne F. (1956). The Aboriginal Population of the North Coast of California. Vol. 16. Berkeley, California: University of California, Berkeley. pp. 81–130.
- Cook, Sherburne F. (1976). The Conflict between the California Indian and White Civilization. Berkeley: University of California Press.
- Goddard, Pliny Earle (1903). Life and Culture of the Hupa. Vol. 1. The University Press. pp. 1–88.
- Kroeber, A. L. (1925). Handbook of the Indians of California. Washington, D.C.
- Merriam, C. Hart (1966). Ethnographic Notes on California Indian Tribes. Berkeley, California: University of California Archaeological Research Facility. p. 200.
- Murphey, Edith Van Allen (1990) [1959]. Indian Uses of Native Plants. Glenwood, Illinois: Meyerbooks.
- Pritzker, Barry M. (2000). A Native American Encyclopedia: History, Culture, and Peoples. Oxford: Oxford University Press. ISBN 978-0-19-513877-1.
- Wallace, William J. (1978). Heizer, Robert F.; Sturtevant, William C. (eds.). Hupa, Chilula, and Whilkut. In California. Vol. 8. Washington, D.C.: Smithsonian Institution. pp. 91–98.

=== Bibliographies ===
- Hupa Bibliography, from California Indian Library Collections Project
