= Liz Marty May =

American politician from South Dakota (born 1961)

Member of the South Dakota House of Representatives from the 27th district
- Incumbent
- Assumed office 2021
- Preceded by: Steve Livermont
- In office January 11, 2013 – 2019 Serving with Kevin Killer (2013-2017); Steve Livermont (2017-2019)
- Preceded by: Ed Iron Cloud III
- Succeeded by: Peri Pourier

Personal details
- Born: Elizabeth Marty May; January 1, 1961 (age 65) Belle Fourche, South Dakota, U.S.
- Party: Republican

Elizabeth Marty May (born January 1, 1961) is an American politician and a Republican member of the South Dakota House of Representatives representing District 27 since January 12, 2021. Defeated by Democrat Peri Pourier in 2018, she later ran for another seat and succeeded Oglala Republican Steve Livermont.

== Elections ==
=== 2006 ===
When District 27 incumbent Democratic Representative Paul Valandra left the Legislature and left a seat open, May ran as an Independent in the five-way November 7, 2006 General election but lost to incumbent Democratic Representative Jim Bradford and Republican nominee Mark DeVries, who had run for a seat in 2002.

=== 2012 ===
When District 27 incumbent Democratic Representative Edward Iron Cloud left the Legislature and left a seat open, May was unopposed for the June 5, 2012 Republican Primary; in the three-way November 6, 2012 General election incumbent Democratic Representative Kevin Killer took the first seat and May took the second seat with 2,982 votes (36.29%) ahead of Independent candidate Kathleen Ann.
