= Whiteclay, Nebraska =

Whiteclay, Nebraska Makȟásaŋ
- Census-designated place
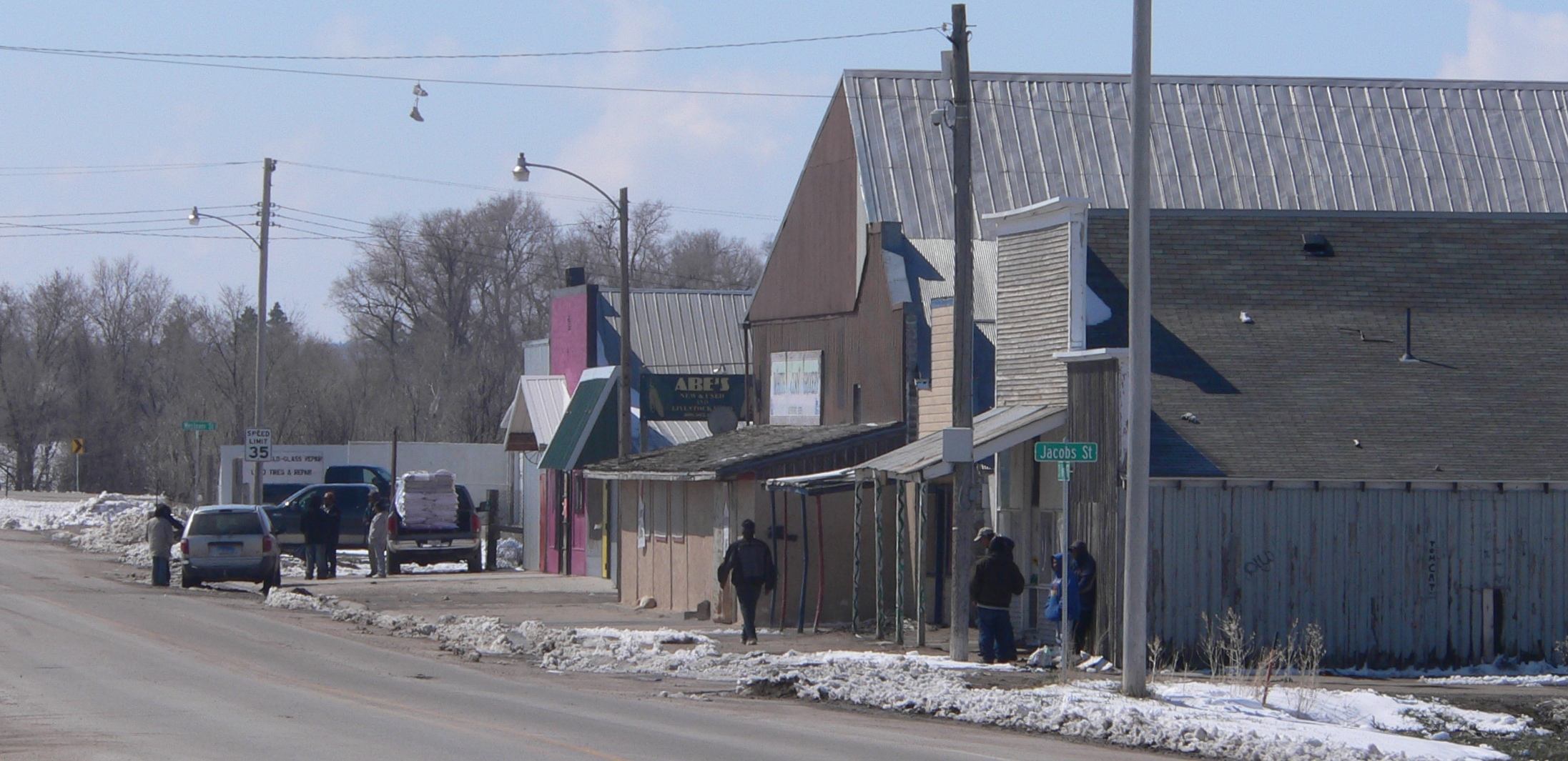
- Nebraska Highway 87 forms the main street of Whiteclay, April 2013

- Location of Whiteclay, Nebraska
- Coordinates: 42°59′49″N 102°33′17″W
- Country: United States
- State: Nebraska
- County: Sheridan

Area
  - Total: 0.069 sq mi (0.18 km^{2})
  - Land: 0.069 sq mi (0.18 km^{2})
  - Water: 0 sq mi (0.00 km^{2})
- Elevation: 3,294 ft (1,004 m)

Population (2020)
  - Total: 8
  - Density: 112/sq mi (43.4/km^{2})
- Time zone: UTC-7 (Mountain (MST))
  - Summer (DST): UTC-6 (MDT)
- ZIP code: 69365
- Area code: 308
- FIPS code: 31-52855
- GNIS feature ID: 834685

Whiteclay (Lakota: Makȟásaŋ; "whiteish or yellowish clay") is a census-designated place (CDP) in Sheridan County, Nebraska, United States. The population was 10 at the 2010 census.

A significant part of Whiteclay's economy was based on alcohol sales to residents of the Pine Ridge Indian Reservation, located two miles (3.2 km) north across the border in South Dakota, where alcohol consumption and possession is prohibited. According to the Nebraska Liquor Control Commission, beer sales at Whiteclay's four liquor stores totalled 4.9 million cans in 2010 (~13,000 cans per day) for gross sales of $3 million. The four beer merchants paid federal and state excise taxes (included in liquor's sale price) of $413,932 that year. In 2017 the four liquor stores lost their licenses, and the town has ceased to be the main supplier of alcohol to the reservation.

== History ==
The border town of Whiteclay has always been tied to the Pine Ridge Indian Reservation to the north within the state boundaries of South Dakota. The majority of the Oglala Sioux Tribe (OST) live at Pine Ridge reservation. The Rosebud Sioux Tribe (Sicangu Oyate), also known as the Brulé Sioux, have an independent and federally recognized reservation to the northeast within the boundaries of South Dakota.

In 1882, after the boundaries of the Pine Ridge Indian Reservation were already established, by executive order the United States government added a 50-square-mile (130 km^{2}) strip of land in Nebraska known as the White Clay Extension (named after White Clay Creek) to the reservation. The area was created to serve as a buffer zone to help prevent the sale of alcohol to residents of the reservation. The language of the order said that the buffer zone would be used until it was no longer considered necessary.

In 1904, President Theodore Roosevelt signed an executive order that removed 49 of the 50 square miles (130 km^{2}) of the White Clay Extension from the reservation. There was no consultation with the Oglala Sioux Tribe as to whether they believed this was useful. Traders immediately established a post near the reservation border and started selling alcohol, and most of their customers came from the nearby reservation. The trading post developed as the unincorporated community of Pine Ridge, commonly known as Whiteclay. It reached its peak population of 104 in 1940, but its population has declined for decades since.

Some Oglala Sioux have appealed to the federal government for another executive order to withdraw the buffer from public domain. They contend that because Roosevelt never demonstrated that the need for the buffer did not exist, the executive order was invalid. Even if such action were achieved, it could always be subject to reversal by another president.

Separately, in a 1999 protest against beer sales at Whiteclay, nine Oglala Sioux led by Tom Poor Bear were arrested. They challenged their arrests by Nebraska officials, on the grounds that, according to the 1868 Fort Laramie Treaty and subsequent federal law, the White Clay Extension is still under the jurisdiction of the Pine Ridge reservation, where alcohol sales are prohibited. The Oglala Sioux Tribal Court ruled in the defendants' favor. In February 2000, the Sheridan County, Nebraska court ruled that the defendants could be charged under local law, as Whiteclay and the border territory were part of the state of Nebraska. A final ruling on the jurisdictional issue could only be made in federal court, for Congress has the authority to establish reservation boundaries.

== Economy ==
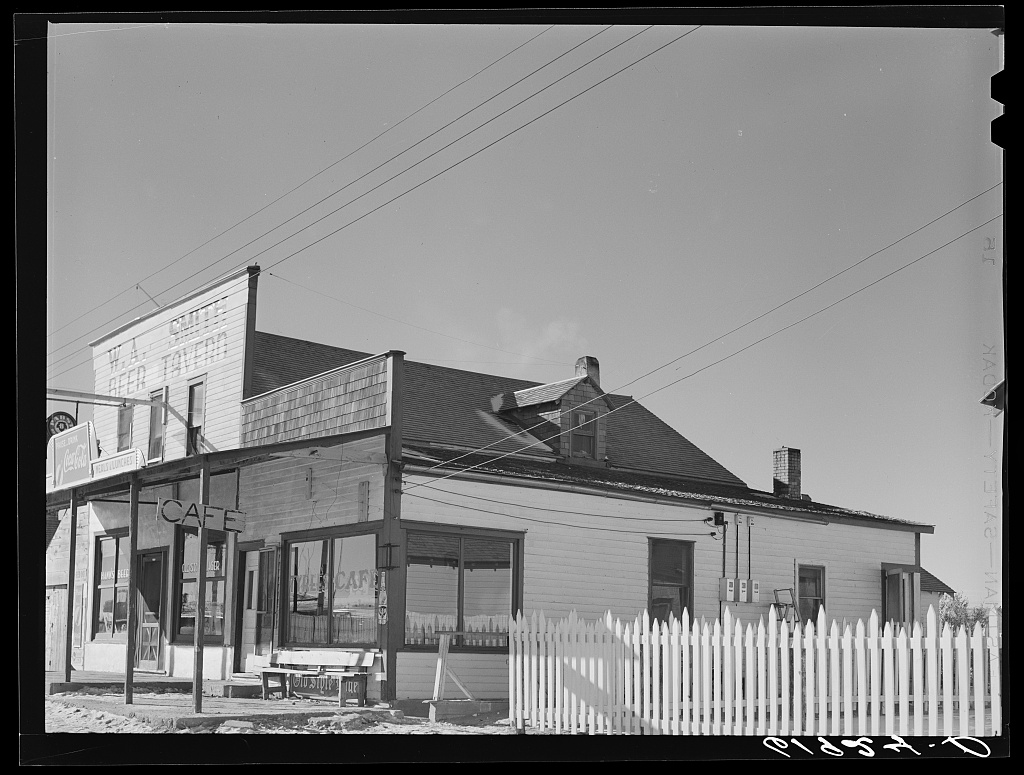
Tavern in Whiteclay, November 1940

Soon after the territory entered the public domain, a trading post was set up to sell alcohol to the Lakota, and merchants have continued to do so since. In 2010, its four beer stores sold an estimated 4.9 million 12-ounce cans of beer, an average of over 13,000 cans per day, for gross sales of 3 million dollars. The outlets provide no place on site for customers to consume beer, and it is not supposed to be drunk on the streets, but inebriated customers were often sprawled around Whiteclay. John Yellow Bird King, president of the Oglala Sioux Tribe, says that tribal members bring alcohol illegally back from Whiteclay and "90 percent of criminal cases in the court system" at the reservation are alcohol-related. Beer was sold almost exclusively to people from the reservation, as the nearest big city (and other customers) is two hours to the north. According to Mary Frances Berry, the 10-year chair of the United States Commission on Civil Rights, Whiteclay can be said to exist only to sell beer to the Oglala Lakota.

Victor Clarke, the owner of Arrowhead Foods, a grocery store in Whiteclay that does not sell alcohol, said he "did more than a million dollars in business last year, with an entirely Native American clientele". As the reservation has no banks and few stores, its residents spend most of their money in Nebraska border towns, for regular needs as well as alcohol. The beer stores in Whiteclay cash welfare and tax refund checks for the Oglala Lakota, taking a 3 percent commission.

=== Activism against beer sales ===
Prior to 2017, the status of Whiteclay's beer stores was a constant political issue in the region, prompting waves of activism to end the alcohol sales. There were problems of public drunkenness in Whiteclay, and violence was associated with alcohol there and on the reservation. A 2000 report stated that tribal police estimated issuing more than 1,000 DUIs annually on the two-mile stretch of road between White Clay and Pine Ridge. Victor Clarke, a grocery store owner in the hamlet, noted that numerous places within an hour's drive could supply beer if Whiteclay were shut down, saying "The state of Nebraska doesn't want Whiteclay to go away because it allows problems to be isolated in this one little place. You hear people in the towns around here saying, 'We don't want these guys in our town.'"

In 2010, the liquor stores paid federal and state excise taxes (included in liquor's sale price) of $413,932, according to the state liquor commission, mostly from sales to residents of the Pine Ridge Indian Reservation. Some activists have supported the legalization of alcohol sales on the reservation so that the tribe can keep the revenues. These would support building a treatment center and founding more programs, and the tribe could directly regulate and control the sales, as other tribes have done. (See discussion below).

A pair of unsolved murders of Lakota men in early 1999 led to protest rallies led by various activist groups, including members of the American Indian Movement (AIM) from Pine Ridge Indian Reservation and Nebraskans for Peace, demanding that Nebraska revoke the liquor licenses of Whiteclay's stores and increase law enforcement in the area. The nearest Nebraska-based law enforcement is the county sheriff's office, based in the county seat of Rushville 22 miles (35 km) to the south. The Sioux tribal law enforcement in Pine Ridge, South Dakota, has no jurisdiction in Whiteclay, and the number of tribal police has been reduced by nearly two thirds over the past several years. In the fall of 1999, Native American activists Russell Means and Frank LaMere proposed getting a license to sell beer in Whiteclay, in order to retain some monies to benefit the tribe and build a treatment center on the reservation, but abandoned the project due to disagreement by others of their group.

In 2005, the state of Nebraska and President Cecilia Fire Thunder of the Pine Ridge reservation signed an agreement to allow Oglala tribal officers to enforce Nebraska laws in Whiteclay by deputizing them as Nebraska agents. The OST Tribal Council had approved the agreement in June 2005 in a meeting with Nebraska officials, the State Attorney General Jon Bruning and Congressman Tom Osborne. With lobbying by Nebraska's delegation, Congress earmarked $200,000 over two years to pay for the increased cost of additional tribal police personnel and other costs of OST patrols to be associated with Whiteclay.

But, by May 2007, the tribe had spent no money for this purpose. Fire Thunder was impeached several months before the end of her term in 2006. The political conflict within the tribe appeared to have resulted in its choosing not to implement the agreement; by May 2007, it had hired no new police nor organized to take advantage of the grant. It stood to lose the earmarked money by October 2007.

Tribal activists of the Strong Heart Society have conducted annual blockades since 1999, trying to intercept alcohol and drugs being brought into the reservation. For instance, in June 2006 tribal activists had protested the beer sales by blockading the road to confiscate beer bought in Whiteclay. The blockade was to be held within the reservation boundaries. The activists had lifted the blockade after agreeing to work with Chief of OST Police James Twiss on ways to limit bootlegging. According to Twiss, the roadblock was illegal; however, the police department lacked the money and manpower to do more to interdict bootlegging from Whiteclay to the reservation.

In May 2007, activists discussed another blockade after some bootleggers were successfully prosecuted by the US Attorney for South Dakota. Two women were sentenced in the case. At the same time, it appeared that by the fall of 2007, the OST would lose $200,000 in federal grants that would have enabled it to hire more police and have them deputized by Nebraska to help police Whiteclay and protect their people. Tribal officials did not talk to reporters when questioned about the lack of action. Mark Vasina of Nebraskans for Peace, who had collaborated with the tribe in protests, said that there was internal tribal conflict over the proposed deputization program. He thought the agreement represented a commitment by Nebraska officials to take action but it "shuns the state's responsibility" for the effects of the beer sales. Vasina's documentary about the issues and activism was released in 2008 as The Battle for Whiteclay.

In 2010, the Nebraska legislature passed a law to provide money for increased law enforcement and economic development in Whiteclay; in December 2010, it awarded a $10,000 grant to Sheridan County, to cover the increased costs for its sheriff's office to patrol Whiteclay, 22 miles north of the county seat. There was the potential for funds to be increased in following years.

Protests continued. In 2013, protesters including then-president of the Oglala tribe, Bryan Brewer, and activist Debra White Plume stopped beer trucks from entering the town.

=== Alternatives ===
A 2007 survey found that 63% of federally recognized tribes in the lower 48 states have legalized liquor sales on their reservations, enabling them to keep the considerable sales taxes and associated revenue generated, regulate the trade, and directly police and treat their own people in relation to this commodity. Those allowing alcohol sales include all the other reservations in South Dakota, such as the Sicangu Oyate or Brulé Sioux at the Rosebud Indian Reservation to the east.

The Winnebago Tribe of Nebraska is among those that have legalized alcohol sales. As another example, in 2006, the Omaha Nation in northeastern Nebraska started requiring payment of tribal license fees and sales taxes by liquor stores located in towns within its reservation boundaries in order to benefit in the alcohol revenues. James N Hughes III suggests that the Oglala Sioux Tribe at the Pine Ridge Indian Reservation could "regulate, police and profit from the sale of what has been, for 200 years, an irresistible liquid commodity." Rather than supporting white traders, the tribe could keep its money within the reservation and directly control and police the alcohol trade.

In 2010 the beer sales at Whiteclay generated $413,932 in federal and state taxes, according to the state liquor commission. Hughes suggests that a "legalized liquor trade could provide the tribe with its own product upon which to levy tribal taxes and generate much needed revenue to fund healthcare services on Pine Ridge," including building a detoxification facility. In addition, proper taxation strategy by the Pine Ridge Indian Reservation could be used to eliminate Whiteclay's stores from the marketplace and "turn a social poison into an economic boon." The tribe could regulate operations of liquor stores, such as hours, and better police selling to underage consumers. In 2004 the tribe voted down a referendum to legalize alcohol sales, and in 2006 the tribal council voted to maintain the ban on alcohol sales.

In the summer of 2010, Denver American Horse, a teacher of the Lakota language, announced as a candidate for president of the Oglala Sioux Tribe. He proposed changing the reservation rules to permit alcohol sales. According to the journalist Mary Garrigan, he said that the "additional taxes that now go off-reservation could be used to fund much-needed alcohol treatment programs." As reported by Timothy Williams, Milton Bians, a tribal police captain, also supports ending prohibition. "Not to disrespect our elders and grandparents, but we've gone through several generations," he said.

Victor Clarke, the manager of a grocery store in Whiteclay, supports the idea of the tribe's ending its prohibition against alcohol sales. He thinks it would be the "biggest economic boon they could do." The tribe would then have both the benefits and responsibility of alcohol sales.

=== Oglala Sioux Tribe v. Jason Schwarting, et al ===
On February 9, 2012, the Oglala Sioux Tribe filed a federal lawsuit against Whiteclay's liquor stores, as well as national beer distributors and manufacturers, including Anheuser-Busch InBev, Molson Coors Brewing Company, Pabst Brewing Company, and Miller Brewing Company. The lawsuit alleged that the defendants knowingly sold and distributed beer with the intent that it be consumed on the Pine Ridge Indian Reservation, where alcohol is banned and alcohol-related problems are rampant.

According to the suit:

The illegal sale and trade in alcohol in Whiteclay is open, notorious and well documented by news reports, legislative hearings, movies, public protests and law enforcement activities. All of the above have resulted in the publication of the facts of the illegal trade in alcohol and its devastating effects on the Lakota people, especially its children, both born and unborn.

The OST sought $500 million in damages for reimbursement of the "cost of health care, social services and child rehabilitation caused by chronic alcoholism on the reservation, which encompasses some of the nation's most impoverished counties". The tribe was represented in the suit by Tom White, the tribe's Omaha-based attorney. As White said, "In a town of 11 people selling 4.9 million 12-ounce servings of beer, there is no way that alcohol could be legally consumed. It's just impossible."

On February 22, 2012, an amended complaint seeking injunctive relief in the OST's lawsuit was filed in response to public comments made to the Nebraska Radio Network on February 10, 2012, by the Nebraska State Attorney General Jon Bruning, the highest law enforcement officer in the state. According to the amended complaint, it is "not reasonable to expect that in the future the State of Nebraska will enforce its laws regulating the sale of alcohol at Whiteclay." Bruning had said he believed the State of Nebraska should not be involved in the suit; that shutting down the beer stores was not the solution; that reservation residents would drive further afield to purchase alcohol, which might lead to increased drunk driving; and that any money recovered in damages by the OST, in this suit or others, might be used to buy alcohol.

Federal law (18 U.S.C. § 1161) prohibits the sale and distribution of alcohol on reservations unless allowed by the tribal government. Charles Abourezk, a Rapid City lawyer, said the Whiteclay lawsuit challenged the defendants' "intent to distribute on a dry reservation, contrary to federal and tribal law".

On October 1, 2012, the U.S. District Judge John M. Gerrard dismissed the Oglala Sioux Tribe's lawsuit against the beer stores and associated companies, saying that the federal court did not have jurisdiction over the issue. He dismissed it "without prejudice, meaning the tribe could take its claims to state court." The judge acknowledged that beer sales contributed to problems on the reservation.

=== Nebraska state response ===
As noted, the Nebraska legislature created bills to increase funding for police protection and health services in the area. In February 2012 Nebraska lawmakers were

considering legislation that would allow the state to limit the types of alcohol sold in areas like Whiteclay. The measure would require local authorities to ask the state to designate the area an 'alcohol impact zone.' Under the legislation, the state liquor commission would be authorized to "limit the hours alcohol sellers are open, ban the sale of certain products or impose other restrictions."

The measure was introduced by Nebraska state Senator LeRoy Louden of Ellsworth, whose district included Whiteclay. Sheridan County officials supported it.

=== Liquor license renewals denied ===
In April 2017, the three-member Nebraska Liquor Control Commission voted to deny license renewals to the four liquor stores in Whiteclay, citing inadequate law enforcement in the area. The stores were allowed to continue selling beer until the existing licenses expired at midnight on April 30, 2017. The store owners appealed the decision to the Nebraska Supreme Court, but their appeal was denied. Since that time, the town has cleaned up, with fewer vagrants; however, bootlegging continues on the reservation and many now travel to other Nebraska towns like Rushville.

== Geography ==
For the 2000 Census, the CDP for Whiteclay was erroneously named 'Pine Ridge'. The name has been corrected to 'Whiteclay' in 2010 for all subsequent census products and reports. A small portion of the Pine Ridge reservation overlaps with the Whiteclay CDP in Nebraska. According to the United States Census Bureau, the census-designated place (CDP) known as "Whiteclay, Nebraska" has a total area of 1.0 square mile (640 acres; 260 ha; 2.6 km^{2}), of which 0.9 square mile (2.3 km^{2}) is land and 0.1 square mile (0.2 km^{2}) (8.33%) is water.

== Demographics ==
Historical population
Census	Pop.	Note	%±
2000	14		—
2010	10		−28.6%
2020	8		−20.0%
U.S. Decennial Census

As of the census of 2000, there were 14 people, seven households, and three families residing in the CDP. The population density was 15.8 people per square mile (6.1/km^{2}). There were 9 housing units at an average density of 10.1/sq mi (3.9/km^{2}). The racial makeup of the CDP was 64.29% Native American and 35.71% White.

There were seven households, out of which 14.3% had children under the age of 18 living with them, 42.9% were married couples living together, and 57.1% were non-families. 57.1% of all households were made up of individuals, and 14.3% had someone living alone who was 65 years of age or older. The average household size was 2.00 and the average family size was 3.33.

In the CDP, 21.4% of the population was under the age of 18, 7.1% was from 18 to 24, 28.6% from 25 to 44, 35.7% from 45 to 64, and 7.1% was 65 years of age or older. The median age was 42 years. For every 100 females, there were 75.0 males. For every 100 females age 18 and over, there were 83.3 males.

The median income for a household in the CDP was $61,250, and the median income for a family was $76,250. Males had a median income of $25,625 versus $53,750 for females. The per capita income for the CDP was $21,394. None of the population or the families were below the poverty line.

== See also ==
- List of census-designated places in Nebraska
