= Kevin Killer =

Native American politician (born 1979)

44th President of the Oglala Sioux Tribe
- In office December 4, 2020 – December 9, 2022
- Vice President: Alicia Mousseau
- Preceded by: Julian Bear Runner
- Succeeded by: Frank Star Comes Out

Member of the South Dakota Senate from the 27th district
- In office 2017–2019
- Preceded by: Jim Bradford
- Succeeded by: Red Dawn Foster

Member of the South Dakota House of Representatives from the 27th district
- In office 2009–2017
- Preceded by: Jim Bradford
- Succeeded by: Steve Livermont

Personal details
- Born: May 4, 1979 (age 47)
- Party: Democratic
- Education: Oglala Lakota College

Kevin Killer (Oglala Sioux) (born May 4, 1979) is a Native American activist and politician. He served as president of the Oglala Sioux Tribe (2020-2022). He served as a Democratic member of the South Dakota House of Representatives from 2009 to 2017 and the South Dakota Senate from 2017 to 2019, representing the 27th district. He lives in Pine Ridge, South Dakota.

In November 2020, he was elected president of the Oglala Sioux Tribe. He was defeated in his 2022 re-election bid by Frank Star Comes Out.

== Early life and education ==
Killer grew up in Denver, Colorado, where his father Francis (Oglala Sioux) was a CPA. His mother Janice (Kiowa tribe) is from Oklahoma. When young, Killer returned to his father's Oglala people on the Pine Ridge Indian Reservation every summer, in order to know them and the land. After his father died when Killer was 20, he was helped by mentors.

Killer graduated from Oglala Lakota College, a tribal college.

== Career ==
In 2004, as an aide to then United States Senator Tom Daschle, he had his first experience in politics. The first Tribal College Fellow for Young People For, a youth leadership development organization, Killer expanded the group's tribal college network in 2009 into a Native American-led group called the Native Youth Leadership Alliance.

Killer was first elected to the South Dakota state legislature as a Representative in 2008. He served on the House State Affairs Committee, which has an important role in moving legislation forward, and its Judicial Affairs Committee. In 2016 he was elected to the State Senate from District 27. In 2015, he was a Bush Fellow.

Since 2010 he has been director of the Native American Youth Leadership Alliance, which seeks to build youth leaders among the people of the reservations. Killer has noted that a high percentage of residents on the reservations are under age 18.

In 2019, Killer became a senior fellow at Prism. He is noted as being the co-founder of Advance Native Political Leadership, a non-profit that aims to expand indigenous representation in elected and appointed offices across the United States.

Concurrent to his political work, Killer has been involved as an actor and executive producer on two short films, Running Shadow and Istinma.

== Personal life ==
He is in a relationship with Sarah Eagle Heart (Oglala Sioux), a non-profit leader, film producer and activist also from the Pine Ridge Reservation.

Preceded by Julian Bear Runner	President of the Oglala Sioux Tribe; 2020–2022	Succeeded by Frank Star Comes Out

Preceded by Jim Bradford	Member of the South Dakota Senate from the 27th district 2017-2019	Succeeded by Red Dawn Foster

Preceded by Jim Bradford	Member of the South Dakota House of Representatives from the 27th district 2009-2017	Succeeded by Steve Livermont
