= Frank Star Comes Out =

Native American politician

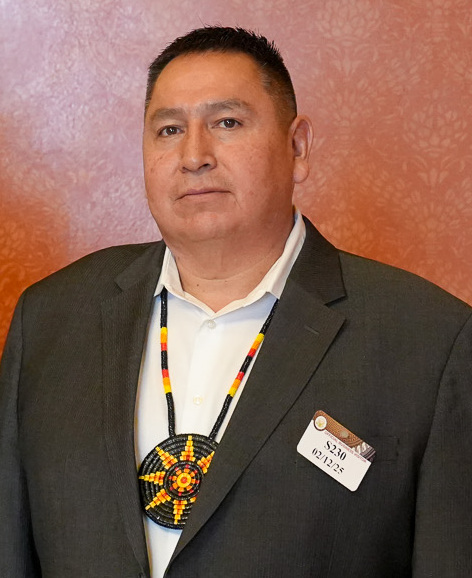

45th President of the Oglala Sioux Tribe
- Incumbent
- Assumed office December 6, 2022
- Vice President: Alicia Mousseau
- Preceded by: Kevin Killer

Frank Star Comes Out (Oglala Sioux) is a Native American politician who has served as president of the Oglala Sioux Tribe since 2022.

== Election ==
In November 2022, Star Comes Out defeated incumbent Kevin Killer by less than 600 votes, and was inaugurated president on December 6, 2022. Star Comes Out was elected to a second term in November 2024 by about 500 votes.

== Crime & Emergency Declaration ==
In July 2022, the tribe sued the Bureau of Indian Affairs, claiming that there was a "public safety crisis" and the bureau was obligated by treaty to provide adequate law enforcement funding to combat it. The tribe said it had only five officers on shift at most times, not enough to cover the reservation. Judge Roberto Lange ruled in favor of the tribe, agreeing that the United States had a treaty obligation to fund law enforcement, but declined to force the bureau to spend a specific amount. Though the ruling was considered a victory for the tribe, it did not lead to an increase in funding.

On November 18, 2023, President Star Comes Out declared a state of emergency "due to a breakdown of Law and Order on the Reservation", blaming the lack of funding for the increase in crime and saying the situation had only gotten worse since the ruling.

== Conflict with Governor Noem ==
In February 2024, Star Comes Out banned South Dakota governor Kristi Noem from the Pine Ridge reservation over her comments that Mexican cartels were using the reservation for drug smuggling, which Star Comes Out claimed were made for political gain. According to Star Comes Out, the U.S. Attorney's office does not believe the cartel is operating in Pine Ridge. Seven or eight of South Dakota's other eight tribes banned her in the following months. Noem responded that she wanted to work with tribal leaders on the cartel issue and increase police funding and that her statement is "not meant to blame the tribes in any way – they are the victim here", but also said "we’ve got some tribal leaders that I believe are personally benefiting from the cartels being there, and that’s why they attack me every day." The Oglala refused to attend her Tribal Public Safety Crisis Summit unless she apologized for her remarks.

Preceded by Kevin Killer	President of the Oglala Sioux Tribe; 2022-current	Incumbent
