= Ed Iron Cloud III =

American politician

Member of the South Dakota House of Representatives from the 27th district
- In office 2008–2012
- Succeeded by: Elizabeth May

Personal details
- Born: August 19, 1964 (age 61)
- Party: Democratic
- Education: Oglala Lakota College
- Occupation: Rancher

Edward Iron Cloud III (born August 19, 1964) is an American politician in the state of South Dakota. He served in the South Dakota House of Representatives from his election in November 2008 to November 2012. He is Native American and a member of the Oglala Sioux tribe.

Iron Cloud is a buffalo rancher, who raises herds for both cultural and commercial reasons. One of Iron Cloud's stated goals has been to educate his community about the buffalo’s cultural and spiritual significance to Oglala Lakota people. Iron Cloud is also a board member of The Knife Chief Buffalo Nation Society, a non-profit based on the Pine Ridge Indian Reservation dedicated to protecting and revitalizing Lakota culture and sacred traditions.
