= Nebraskans For Peace =

American peace advocacy organization

- Formation: 1970
- Type: NGO
- Legal status: 501c4
- Purpose: Peace promotion
- Headquarters: Lincoln, Nebraska
- Executive director: Tim Rinne
- Main organ: State board of directors
- Website: link

Nebraskans For Peace, or NFP, is a peace advocacy organization based in Lincoln, Nebraska, United States. "Nebraskans for Peace is a statewide grassroots advocacy organization working nonviolently for peace with justice through community building, education and political action."

== History ==
Founded in 1970, NFP is a statewide progressive organization conducting active grassroots campaigns focused on promoting peace and social justice. NFP was preceded by Rural Nebraskans for Peace, formed in 1968, and a short-lived University of Nebraska-Lincoln student group called Nebraskans for Peace in Vietnam, formed in 1966. A chapter has existed at the University of Nebraska–Lincoln since at least 2002 and a chapter at the University of Nebraska Omaha was founded in 2003.

== Recent campaigns ==
NFP has been campaigning the Nebraska State Legislature to make the community of Whiteclay officially "dry" so that local businesses can no longer sell alcohol to Native Americans on the neighboring Pine Ridge Reservation in South Dakota. They allied with reservation members on this issue, marching together in 1999 after two murders of Lakota men in Whiteclay.

In 2005 President Cecilia Fire Thunder of the Oglala Sioux Tribe and the Nebraska governor's office made an historic agreement to deputize tribal police to enforce laws in Whiteclay, as Nebraska law enforcement was based 22 miles away in the county seat. Fire Thunder was impeached in 2006 based on other issues. According to Mark Vasina, a Nebraska activist interviewed in 2007, internal tribal politics appeared to interfere with the tribe's proceeding to implement the agreement. By mid-2007 the OST had hired no police personnel and made no commitments of funds; it lost the federal earmarked funds of $200,000. Mark Vasina, former president of Nebraskans for Peace, released his documentary The Battle for Whiteclay in 2008, showing the work of tribal activists to end beer sales at Whiteclay. In 2009 it won an award for Political Documentaries at a New York film festival. In December 2010, the Nebraska legislature authorized $10,000 for increased police patrols in Whiteclay.

Nebraksans for Peace has also worked in anti-war campaigns, ranging from weekly vigils against the Iraq war at the State Capitol Building in Lincoln to peaceful protests at the Offutt Air Force Base in Omaha to commemorate and protest the dropping of nuclear bombs on Hiroshima and Nagasaki in Japan. They continue addressing this issue, with recent protests against a STRATCOM conference called "Strategic Space and Defense" held in Omaha.

Nebraskans For Peace has worked against Nebraska Legislative Bill 775, legislation that exempts certain businesses from specific taxations as an incentive to draw more businesses to the state. NFP's position against LB775 is based on the amount of public funds being diverted from the state's coffers while businesses qualifying for the exemption program are waived millions of dollars in taxes.

NFP sponsored the summer 2007 "Taking a Stand for Nonviolent Global Solutions" march across the United States. It was prominent in the recent debate over the sudden retirement of Lincoln East High School teacher named Michael Baker, who was suspected of being forced into retirement because of a peace studies course he taught.

In 2007 the ACLU was investigating allegations that the FBI was spying on a number of current Nebraskans for Peace leaders, including Nan Graf, a board member, and Tim Rinne, the State Coordinator.

== Historic campaigns ==
From the start of the Gulf War to the current Iraq War, NFP has been engaged in a variety of anti-war coordination, including the United for Peace and Justice National Strategy Conference.

Nebraskans for Peace has joined several national campaigns, including the "Campaign for Declassification of Documents on Human Rights Abuses in Latin America".
