= Alex White Plume =

Native American politician (born 1952)

- Born: 1952 (age 73–74); Pine Ridge reservation
- Occupations: Hemp activist President of the Oglala Sioux tribe
- Spouse: Debra White Plume (m. 1988; died 2020)
- Children: 9

Alex White Plume (born 1952) is the former vice president and president of the Oglala Sioux Tribe of the Pine Ridge Reservation, located on South Dakota of the United States. He served as president from June 30, 2006 to November 2006 after Cecilia Fire Thunder was impeached.

From 2000 to 2002, he earned unwanted publicity when United States federal drug agents raided his farm and destroyed his crop of industrial hemp before he could harvest it for seed as intended. They got a court order prohibiting him to grow the crop. Although the Oglala Sioux have sovereignty on their land and hemp does not have psychoactive properties, the agents operated under a 1968 federal anti-drug law prohibiting the cultivation of Cannabis-related crops. By contrast, the sale of hemp products is allowed in the United States. Issues of tribal sovereignty on this issue are still at play, although the 8th US Circuit Court of Appeals upheld the DEA action. They acknowledged that the DEA registration process could be a burden for farmers like White Plume.

== Early life and education ==
Alex White Plume was born on the Pine Ridge Reservation. He grew up strongly connected to traditional Lakota culture. He joined the U.S. Army and was stationed in Berlin, Germany, until his enlistment ended in 1978. After returning to Pine Ridge, he lived in the Manderson housing project. At that time, he joined the Tribal Police as an officer. White Plume's interest in socio-political issues developed later in life. In 1988, he married Debra White Plume.

== Career ==
White Plume has pursued a life of farming but had difficulty succeeding with crops on the limited agricultural lands of the reservation, where physical conditions are harsh and challenging. He and his extended family, or tiospaye, tried alfalfa, barley and corn; they also tried to raise raised horse and bison, which are being raised by ranchers in growing herds on the Great Plains. All yielded little more than subsistence under the harsh conditions.

After considerable research, in 1998 the Oglala Sioux Tribe passed an ordinance to allow the cultivation of low-THC hemp on the reservation. The market for the crop was high around the world, and it is a sustainable product with a short growing season. During World War II, the US government encouraged hemp's cultivation for its qualities of "hardiness, utility and low cost."

In April 2000 White Plume and his family planted industrial hemp on their farm on the Pine Ridge Reservation. He is reportedly the only farmer to date to openly plant, cultivate, and produce cannabis-related crops within the borders of the United States since they were prohibited by federal anti-drug laws in 1968. While hemp products can be sold in the United States, its cultivation is prohibited, a law implemented by the Drug Enforcement Administration (DEA). Although related to cannabis, hemp does not have psychoactive properties and is in demand worldwide for a variety of uses, including processing as a cloth and as food.

In addition, White Plume thought that the tribe's sovereignty on its land would enable him to grow the crop. Federal DEA agents made a surprise raid on his field that August and destroyed his crops. In August 2002, he was served with eight civil charges by the US District Attorney related to the hemp cultivation, and a court order prohibiting continued growing of the crop. Although he appealed, the 8th US Circuit Court of Appeals upheld the DEA, while acknowledging that its registration process could be a burden and that hemp might be a good crop for the Pine Ridge Reservation.

After several movements leading to the legalization of marijuana for both recreational and medical, White Plume was able to get the injunction lifted in 2016 and has since been able to cultivate hemp. In 2017, Alex White Plume partnered with Evo Hemp to make hemp food products. "Evo Hemp anticipates that the White Plume hemp line of extracts will account for 25 percent of Evo Hemp’s revenue in 2018"

== Political career ==
Described as a traditionalist Lakota, White Plume was elected vice president of the Oglala Sioux Tribe in November 2004, serving until June 29, 2006. After the Tribal Council impeached President Cecilia Fire Thunder and removed her from office for working to establish family planning services on the reservation without Tribal Council consensus, White Plume served as president until the next election in November 2006.

As president, he believed in a return to the "traditional government" of the Oglala. In particular, he proposed returning to use of the Lakota language for government business and to only allow traditional language speakers to be candidates, stating "we created all these problems by using the English language ... my feelings [is we] have to use a different language to solve those problems, this is the only way this can happen".

He was succeeded by John Yellow Bird Steele, who had served as president before Fire Thunder was elected.

In 2009, White Plume criticized the two deaths and 19 people hospitalized resulting from James Arthur Ray's crowding 64 people into a sweat lodge. Ray, a non-Native, multimillionaire, self-help guru, had for years been running sweat lodges and retreats for "Spiritual Warriors" — customers who paid a high fee. White Plume said the Lakota were working with other tribes to try to prevent their sacred ceremonies being stolen and abused by such outsiders.

Preceded by Cecilia Fire Thunder	President of the Oglala Sioux Tribe; 2006	Succeeded by John Yellow Bird Steele
