= John Yellow Bird Steele =

Native American tribal president (born 1945)

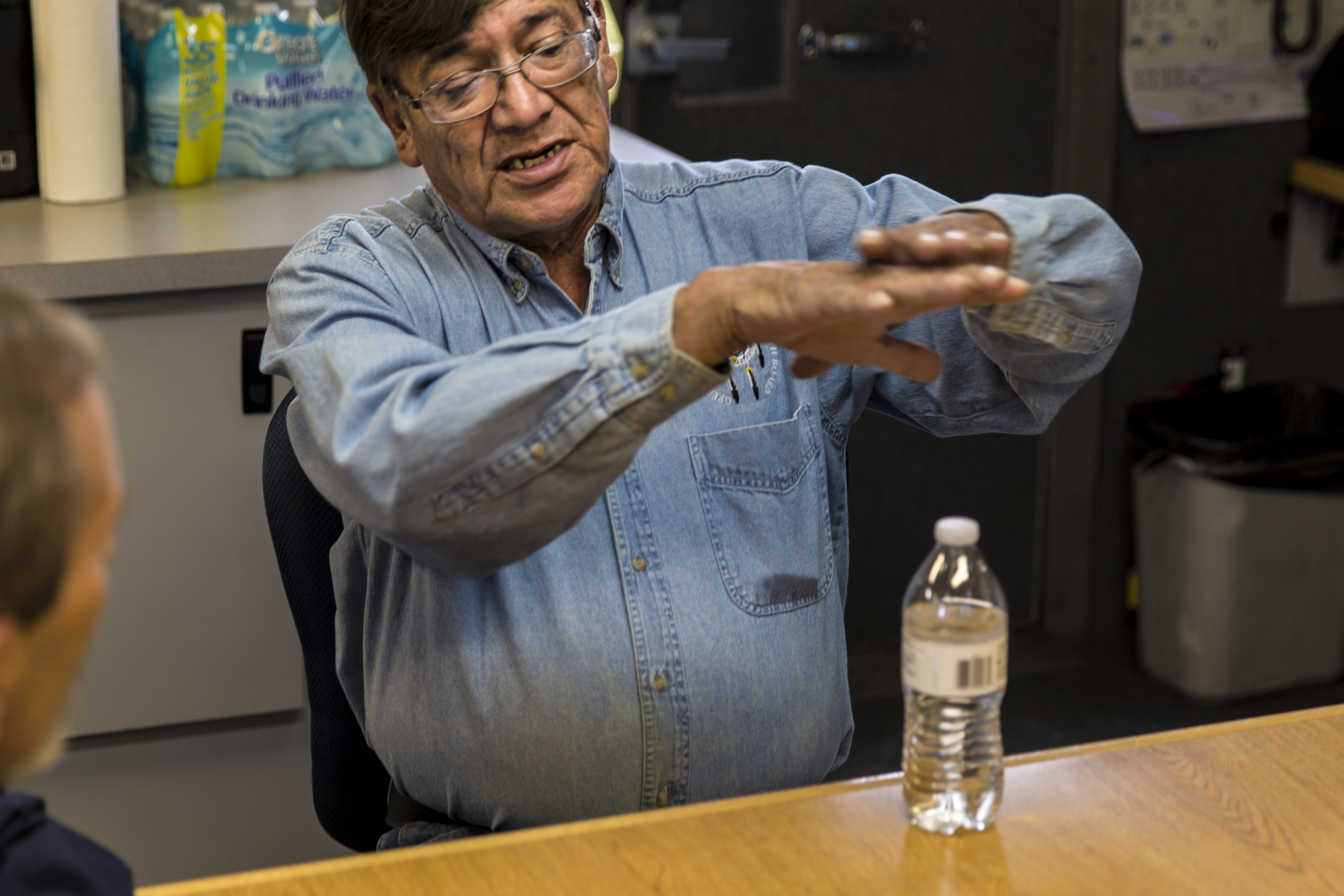

President of the Oglala Sioux Tribe
- In office December 2014 – December 2016
- Preceded by: Bryan Brewer
- Succeeded by: Troy "Scott" Weston
- In office 2010–2012
- Preceded by: Theresa Two Bulls
- Succeeded by: Bryan Brewer
- In office 2006–2008
- Preceded by: Alex White Plume
- Succeeded by: Theresa Two Bulls
- In office 2000–2004
- Preceded by: Harold Dean Salway
- Succeeded by: Cecilia Fire Thunder
- In office 1996–1998
- Preceded by: Wilber Between Lodges
- Succeeded by: Harold Dean Salway
- In office 1992–1994
- Preceded by: Harold Dean Salway
- Succeeded by: Wilber Between Lodges

Vice-President of the Oglala Sioux Tribe
- In office 1982–1986

Tribal Council Representative from the Wounded Knee District
- In office 1978–1982

Personal details
- Born: November 3, 1945 (age 80) Rockyford, Pine Ridge Indian Reservation
- Party: Independent
- Spouse: Anna Little Dog

John Yellow Bird Steele is an American politician. He was the President of the Oglala Sioux Tribe for 14 years. Akim Reinhardt described him as "arguably the most successful Pine Ridge politician of the IRA era".

== Career ==
Between 1992 and 2016, Steele served seven non-consecutive two-year terms as president of the Oglala Sioux Tribe. Prior to serving as president, he served as vice-president for two terms, and as a tribal council representative. He has also served as an advocate for the Black Hills Treaty Council.

=== Elections ===
Despite Steele's record-setting seven terms, he has only won re-election once, in 2002. Many times, he was defeated when seeking re-election, only to defeat his successor in the next election (or, as in 2006, to defeat the person serving out the rest of his successor's term).

Steele was first elected president in 1992, succeeding Harold Dean Salway. His first term ended in 1994, when he was succeeded by Wilber Between Lodges.

Steele took over from Between Lodges again in 1996, only to be succeeded by Salway in 1998.

Steele regained the presidency from Salway in 2000, and won re-election in 2002. He was succeeded by Cecilia Fire Thunder in 2004.

In 2006, he succeeded Alex White Plume, who had become president after Fire Thunder's impeachment. In doing so, he broke Frank Wilson's record for most terms in office. He was succeeded by Theresa Two Bulls in 2008, and then defeated her in 2010. His sixth term ended in 2012, when he lost to Bryan Brewer.

Finally, he won election in 2014, defeating Brewer. His most recent term ended when he was defeated by Troy "Scott" Weston in November 2016.

In 2020, Steele ran for an eighth term as president against Weston and the incumbent, Julian Bear Runner; however, he was unsuccessful in his bid.

=== Policies ===
Steele is known for his "aggressive lobbying" of the United States on behalf of the tribe. He has testified before Congress multiple times, advocating for tribal sovereignty and reminding the US of its treaty obligations. He also urged them to recognize the Lakota code talkers with Congressional Gold Medals.

==== Economic Policy ====
In 1989, Oglala Lakota County (then known as Shannon County) held the distinction of having the worst poverty rate in the United States. When Steele took office in 1992, he stated that free enterprise was the solution, and worked to open casinos as an anti-poverty measure. At least one casino, the Prairie Winds Casino, opened during his first term in office; he then helped it expand into a much larger facility during his 5th term.

==== Health Policy ====
In February 2015, faced with a large number of suicides among teens and pre-teens on the reservation, Steele declared an emergency. He successfully got the Indian Health Service to deploy additional counselors, but suicides continued to rise. Steele expressed his frustration with the situation, saying "When you have a good understanding of what’s happening, come back and tell me."

Following Russell Means' death from cancer, Steele also said he wanted to see a "war on cancer in Indian country" and would host a conference on cancer treatments and preventions.

== Personal life ==
Steele is married to Anna Little Dog from the Manderson District. They have 9 children and 23 grandchildren.

Preceded by Bryan Brewer	President of the Oglala Sioux Tribe; 2014-2016	Succeeded by Troy "Scott" Weston
Preceded by Theresa Two Bulls	President of the Oglala Sioux Tribe; 2010-2012	Succeeded by Bryan Brewer
Preceded by Alex White Plume	President of the Oglala Sioux Tribe; 2006-2008	Succeeded by Theresa Two Bulls
Preceded by Harold Dean Salway	President of the Oglala Sioux Tribe; 2000-2004	Succeeded by Cecilia Fire Thunder
Preceded by Wilber Between Lodges	President of the Oglala Sioux Tribe; 1996-1998	Succeeded by Harold Dean Salway
Preceded by Harold Dean Salway	President of the Oglala Sioux Tribe; 1992-1994	Succeeded by Wilber Between Lodges
