= Theresa Two Bulls =

Native American politician (1949–2020)

President of the Oglala Sioux Tribe
- In office December 2008 – December 2010
- Vice President: Shorty Brewer
- Preceded by: John Yellow Bird Steele
- Succeeded by: John Yellow Bird Steele

Member of the South Dakota Senate from the 27th district
- In office January 2005 – January 2009
- Preceded by: Micheal LaPointe
- Succeeded by: Jim Bradford

Personal details
- Born: October 23, 1949 Pine Ridge, South Dakota
- Died: November 21, 2020 (aged 71) Chadron, Nebraska
- Party: Democratic
- Spouse(s): Ellis Steve Brings Him Back, Jr
- Profession: Prosecutor, Politician

Theresa B. "Huck" Two Bulls (Oglala Sioux) (October 23, 1949 – November 21, 2020) was a Native American attorney, prosecutor and politician of the Oglala Sioux Tribe. In 2004 she was elected as Democratic member of the South Dakota Senate, representing the 27th district, the first American Indian woman to be elected to the state legislature. She served until 2008. That year Two Bulls was elected as president of the Oglala Sioux Tribe of the Pine Ridge Reservation, the second woman to serve in this position. She served one term, which was two years.

In elective office, Two Bulls particularly worked to develop stronger relationships between tribal and local and state governments. She also served on a United States Department of Justice task force to develop guidelines for and implementation of a study to reduce violence against Indian women. In 2015 she was secretary-treasurer of the National Congress of American Indians.

== Early life and education ==
Theresa Two Bulls was born into the Oglala Lakota Tribe in Oglala, where her mother worked for the Bureau of Indian Affairs (BIA) at the Lone Man School. She had to retire after becoming ill and the family moved to the town of Pine Ridge in 1964. Theresa went to the Pine Ridge School. She first earned an associate degree.

== Career ==
Two Bulls started her career as a legal secretary. Later she graduated from college, completed law school and passed the bar. She worked as an attorney.

Elected as a member of the Oglala Sioux Tribal Council, Two Bulls served four terms as Secretary of the executive committee. She was also elected as vice-president of the Tribe.

In 2003 Two Bulls became a tribal prosecutor for the State Attorney General's Office in South Dakota. The next year she ran for the state senate. When she won, the AG's office gave her a sabbatical in order to serve in state office.

In 2004 Two Bulls was elected as a Democrat to the South Dakota Senate, representing the 27th district. She was the first American Indian woman elected to the state senate. Her district included Bennett, Haakon, Jackson, and Shannon counties.

Two Bulls' election to the state senate followed a statewide Democratic voter registration drive in 2002 and rising political engagement by Native Americans. Since the 1990s, Bennett County, located between the Pine Ridge and Rosebud reservations, has become majority-Native American in population and the people have taken part in local politics. In 2002, Oglala Sioux candidates were elected to positions as county sheriff, county commissioner, and as a member of the county school board (the latter was the first time a Native American has had a seat on the board).

While in the senate, Two Bulls served on the State/Tribal Relations Committee, as a member of the Health and Human Services Committee since 2005, and as member of the State-Local Government Committee. She also served on a national task force to assist the Department of Justice to develop guidelines for a study on violence against Indian women, and to implement the resulting recommendations. She was re-elected to the state senate in 2006.

In 2008 Two Bulls was narrowly defeated for state office by Republican Jim Bradford, a teacher and former state representative. After losing to Two Bulls in the 2008 Democratic primary for the state senate, he had switched to the Republican Party. He ran a second time against her as a Republican. About a year after the election, Bradford switched back and rejoined the Democratic Party.

In 2008, Two Bulls was elected as president of the Oglala Sioux Tribe of the Pine Ridge Indian Reservation, defeating the actor Russell Means, a former American Indian Movement (AIM) activist, who had placed first in the primary. The position has a two-year term. Her vice-president was Shorty Brewer. Two Bulls was the second woman elected to that position after Cecilia Fire Thunder, who was elected in 2004.

Soon after their election, she and program directors went to Washington, D.C. to lobby for federal stimulus funds. The OST received monies for two road projects, an ambulance, Department of Justice grants for law enforcement, and money for tribal housing. Based on her work in the state senate, Two Bulls developed relationships with local (county) and state governments to deal with regional issues.

When the rate of suicide rose among youth on the reservation in late 2009, Two Bulls declared a state of emergency to address the problem, gathered counselors to work with residents, and organized a call-in to President Barack Obama's White House to highlight the issue. That winter she responded quickly to a severe blizzard, arranging for transportation of emergency supplies of propane, wood and food to people in outlying areas of the reservation. "When Native American veterans of the Korean War were honored recently [2009-2010] in Rapid City, Theresa Two Bulls was the only tribal president to show up...." She shook each veteran's hand.

In October 2010 Two Bulls and John Yellow Bird Steele were the top two candidates for tribal president, so competed in the November election. Two Bulls lost narrowly as Steele won with 51.1% of the vote. He had earlier served five terms as president of the tribe since 1992. Thomas Poor Bear won as vice-president.

Two Bulls and her Executive Committee filed a complaint about the election, alleging violations of election guidelines. The OST Election Commission did not certify the results until 25 days after the election, but upheld the results, as did the Oglala Sioux Tribal Court.

== Marriage, family, and death ==
Two Bulls was married to Ellis Steve Brings Him Back, Jr, with children. She died on November 21, 2020, in Chadron, Nebraska.

== See also ==
- List of Native American politicians
- Native American women in politics

Preceded by John Yellow Bird Steele	President of the Oglala Sioux Tribe; 2008-2010	Succeeded by John Yellow Bird Steele
Preceded by Micheal LaPointe	Member of the South Dakota Senate from the 27th district 2005-2009	Succeeded by Jim Bradford
