= Troy "Scott" Weston =

Native American politician

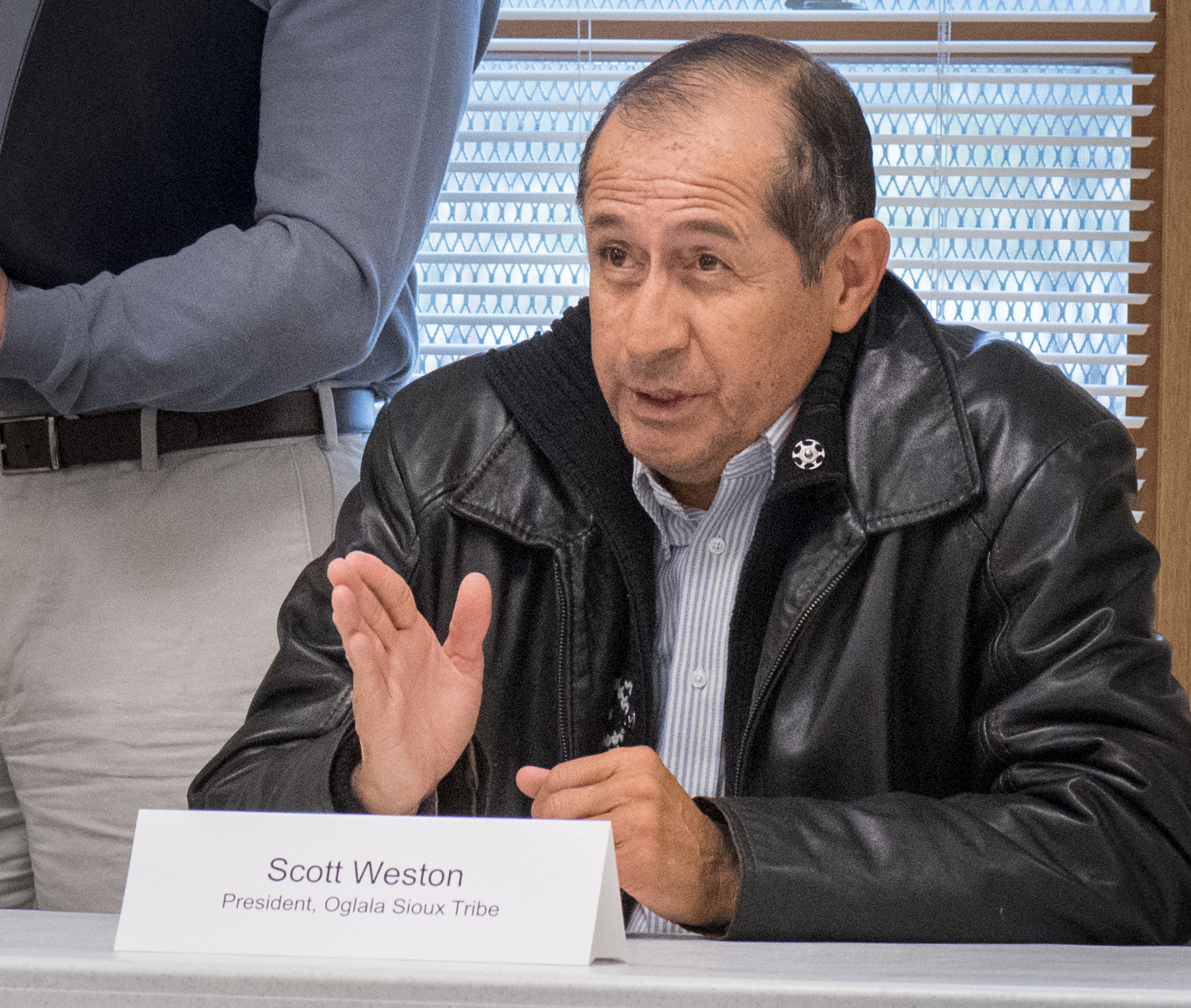

President of the Oglala Sioux Tribe
- In office 2016–2018
- Preceded by: John Yellow Bird Steele
- Succeeded by: Julian Bear Runner

Troy "Scott" Weston was president of the Oglala Sioux Tribe from 2016 to 2018.

== Elections ==
In 2016, he won a landslide victory against the incumbent John Yellow Bird Steele, winning nearly 2/3rds of the vote. He did not seek re-election in 2018; he did not give a reason why.

== Issues and Actions ==
At his inauguration, Weston stated that his priorities were improving the economy of the people and representing their interests in Washington.

In August 2018, Weston requested a disaster declaration from FEMA due to tornadoes and severe storms. FEMA denied the request, stating the damage was not severe enough to warrant disaster relief.

Preceded by John Yellow Bird Steele	President of the Oglala Sioux Tribe; 2016-2018	Succeeded by Julian Bear Runner
