= Chief Big Road =

Oglala chief, warrior, and artist

Big Road
- Čanku Tanka
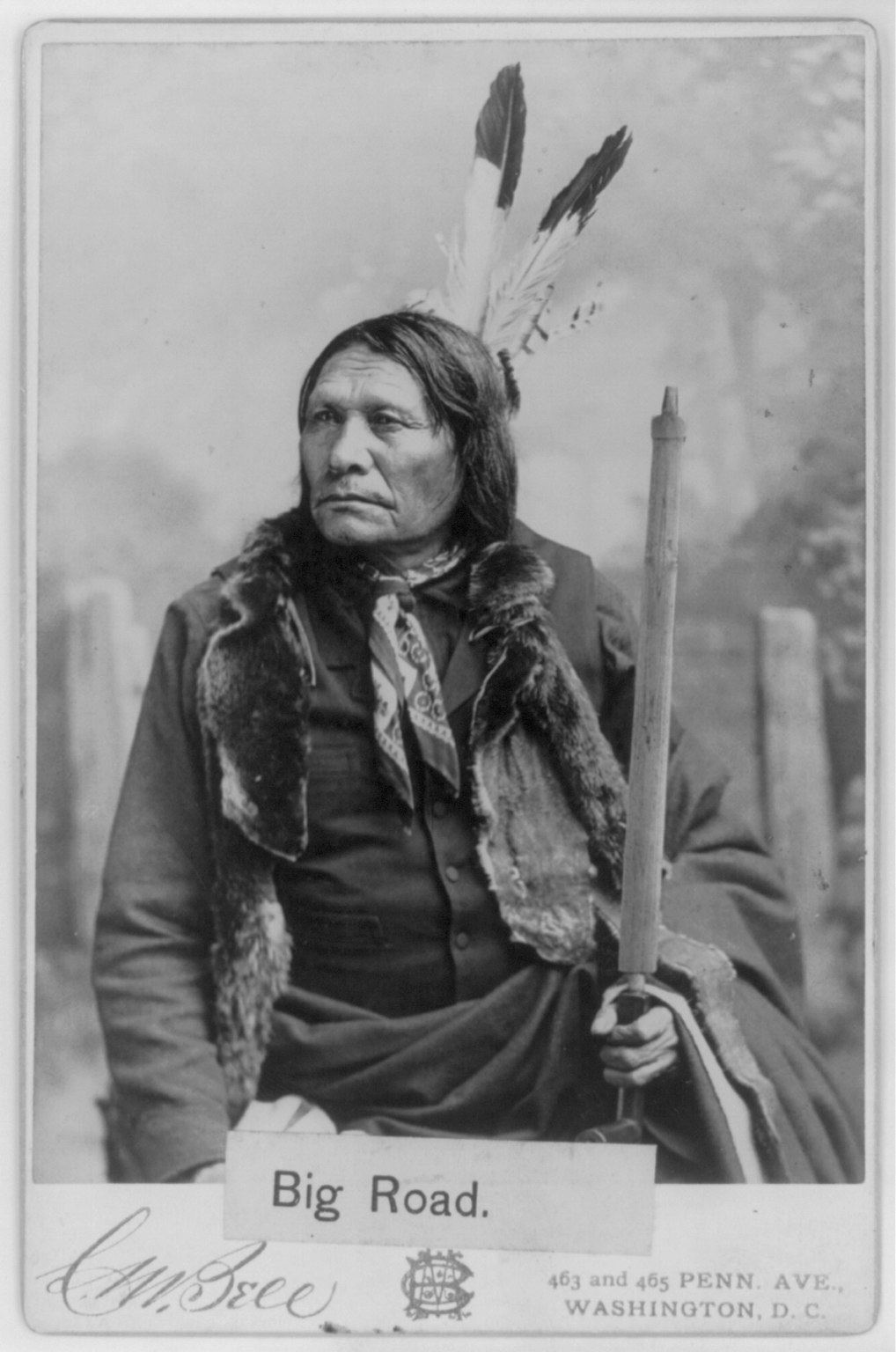
- Died: 1897
- Occupations: chief, warrior

Big Road (c. 1834 – 1897) was a Oglala warrior and artist of the Oyuhpe Band. Also called Čanku Tanka or Wide Trail, Big Road fought in the Fetterman Fight of Red Cloud's War and the Battle of the Little Bighorn. His artwork is in the collection of the Smithsonian Institution.

In May 1877, he surrendered with Crazy Horse. In October 1877, he was part of a delegation to Washington, D.C. Big Road fled to Canada after Crazy Horse was killed, returning to Pine Ridge Reservation around 1881. In 1891 he again traveled with several others to Washington.

== Illustrated roster ==
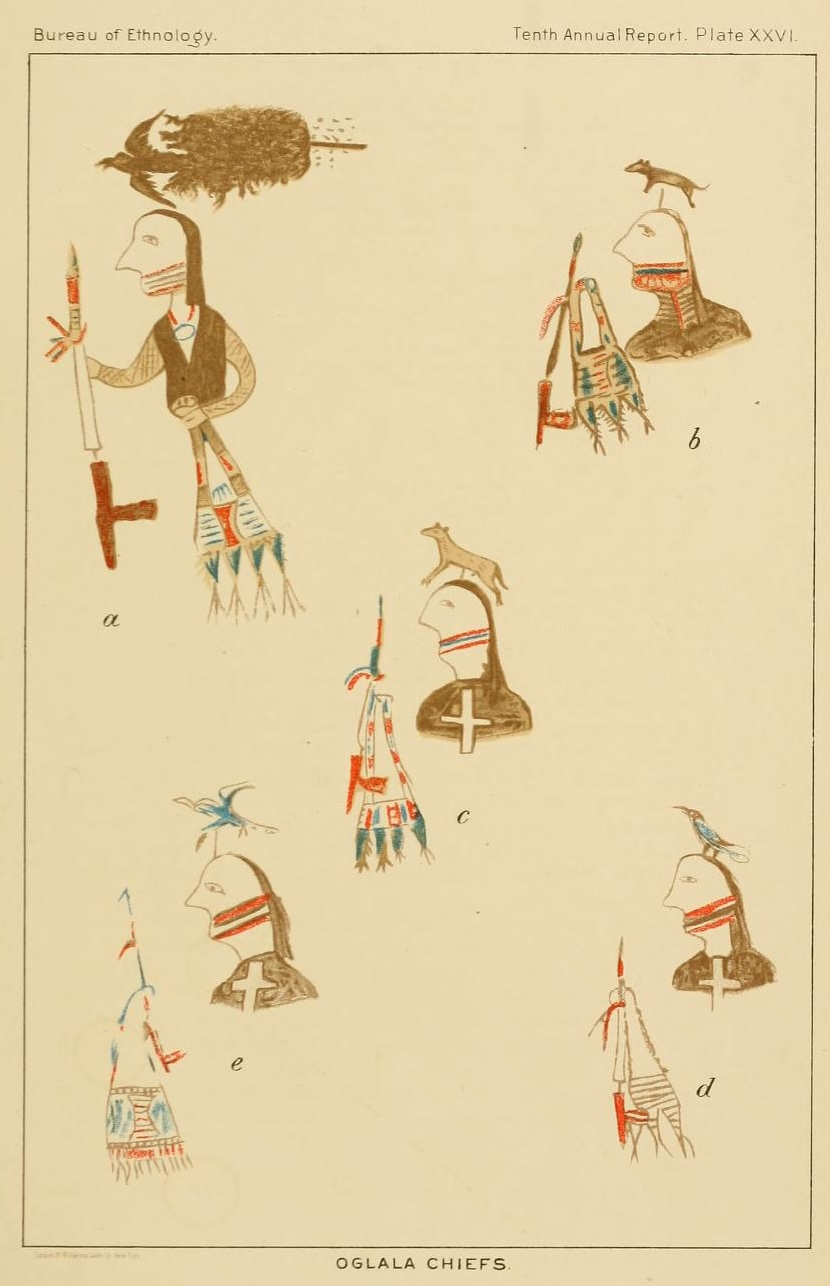
Extracted portraits from Big Road's roster, showing Oglala chiefs. Big Road himself is depicted at top left.

In 1883, Chief Big Road was required to submit an account of his followers to U.S. Indian agent Major McLaughlin. His illustrated roster of clan members, published in the Bureau of American Ethnology bulletin in 1886, gives side-view portraits of 84 individuals, along with imagery referencing each person's name and features.
