= Steve Livermont =

American politician

Member of the South Dakota House of Representatives from the 27th district
- In office 2017–2021
- Preceded by: Kevin Killer
- Succeeded by: Liz Marty May

Personal details
- Born: December 13, 1955 (age 70)
- Party: Republican

Steve Livermont (born December 13, 1955) is a Native American politician and rancher, who served as a Republican member of the South Dakota House of Representatives, representing the 27th district from 2017 until 2021. He chose not to seek reelection in 2020. During his time in the legislature, he was the only Native American Republican present in the State House, until 2018 when Republican Tamara St. John, a Sisseton Sioux, was elected. He lives in Martin.

== Electoral history ==
In 2016, Incumbent Representative Kevin Killer decided to run for the South Dakota Senate leaving one of the two seats open in district 27. Livermont and Incumbent Representative May were unopposed in the June Republican Primary.

South Dakota House of Representatives, District 27 Republican Primary, 2016
Party	Candidate
Republican	Liz Marty May (Incumbent)
Republican	Steve Livermont

In the 2016 District 27 General Election, Livermont and May faced Democrats Red Dawn Foster and State Senator Jim Bradford, as well as Independent Everette McKinley. The election ended with Incumbent May taking the first seat and Livermont taking the second.

South Dakota House of Representatives, District 27 General Election, 2016
Party	Candidate	Votes	%	+%
Republican	Liz Marty May (Incumbent)	2,905	25.97%	
Republican	Steve Livermont	2,847	25.45%	
Democratic	Red Dawn Foster	2,612	23.35%	
Democratic	Jim Bradford	2,471	22.09%	
Independent	Everette McKinley	351	3.14%	

In 2018, Incumbents Liz Marty May and Steve Livermont decided to run again and were unopposed the June Republican Primary.

South Dakota House of Representatives, District 27 Republican Primary, 2018
Party	Candidate
Republican	Liz Marty May (Incumbent)
Republican	Steve Livermont Incumbents

In the 2018 District 27 General Election, Livermont and May will face Democrats Margaret Ross and Perri Pourier .

South Dakota House of Representatives, District 27 General Election, 2018
Party	Candidate	Votes	%	+%
Republican	Liz Marty May (Incumbent)	'		
Republican	Steve Livermont (Incumbent)			
Democratic	Margaret Ross			
Democratic	Perri Pourier			
