= Arianna Holiday =

Indian Relay competitor

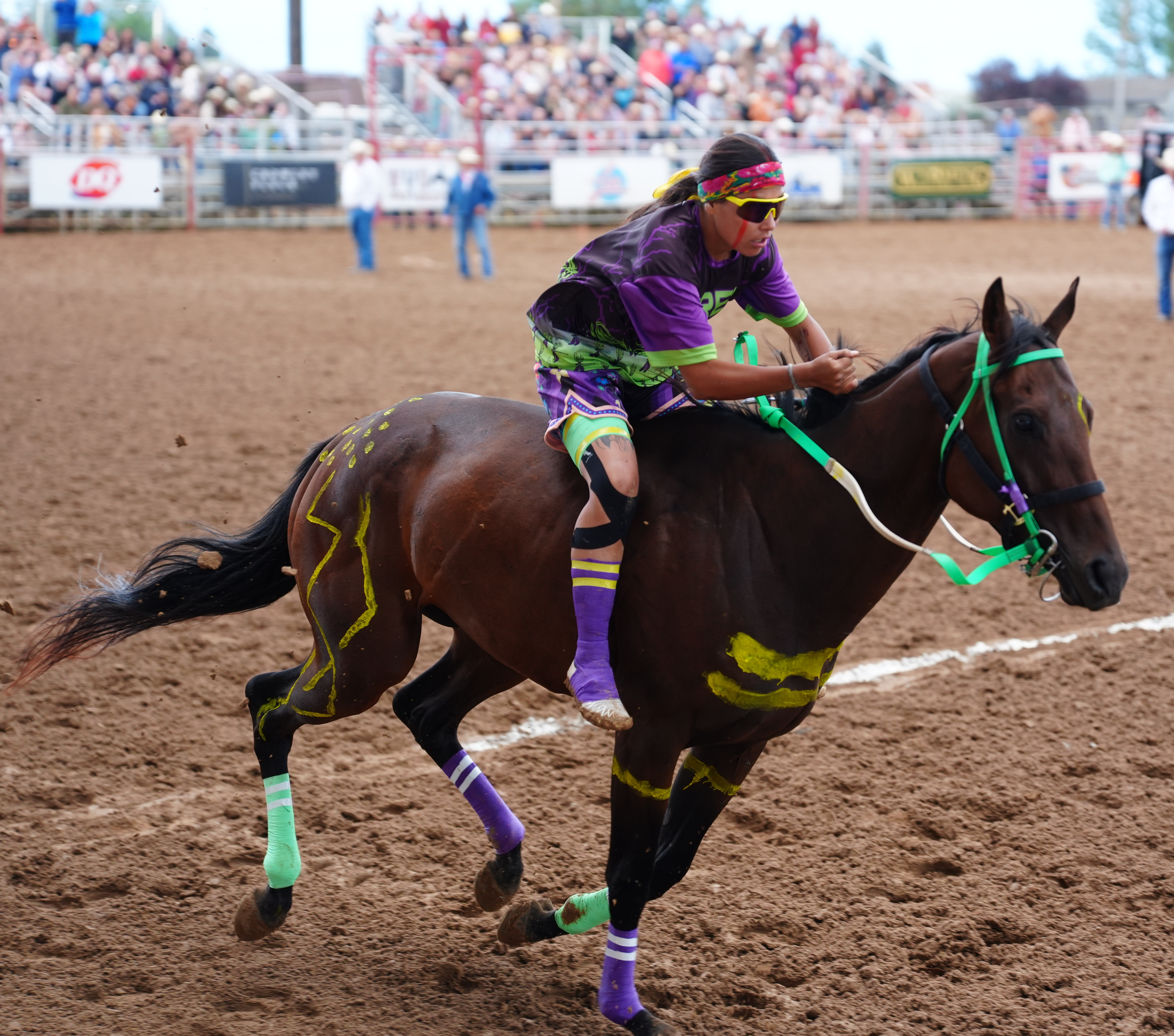
- Holiday at 2026 Sheridan WYO Rodeo Indian Relay

Personal information
- Born: 2009/2010

Sport
- Sport: Indian Relay
- Team: Brew Crew (Indian Relay team)

Achievements and titles
- World finals: Winner, 2025 Championships of Champions Women’s Division

Arianna Holiday is a championship-winner rider in Indian Relay horse racing. She is a member of the Brew Crew team from the Oglala Sioux tribe in southern South Dakota.

== Early life ==
Holiday began riding horses at age 7 after watching her older cousins compete in Indian Relay. She started competing in 2022.

In 2025 Brew Crew was one of the first female teams brought to the World Championship Indian Relay Race, which runs concurrently with the Sheridan WYO Rodeo in Sheridan, Wyoming.

== Notable Wins ==
Among the notable races Holiday has won with the Brew Crew are

- 2025 Horse Nations Indian Relay Council’s Championship of Champions, women's division.
- 2026 World Championship Indian Relay Race, women's division in Sheridan, Wyoming.
