= Four Guns =

Native American tribal judge

Four Guns was an Oglala Lakota tribal judge of the late 19th century. He was critical of the "white man's" tradition of writing.

== Oral tradition ==
Four Guns was known for justifying the oral tradition and was critical of the written word. He said, "We are puzzled as to what service all this writing serves. The Indian needs no writings; words that are true sink deep into his heart where they remain; he never forgets them. On the other hand, the white man loses his papers, he is helpless." He used humor in his remarks to identify with his audience, saying "I once heard one of their preachers say that no white man was admitted to heaven, unless there were writings about him [in] a great book."

== Speeches ==
Four Guns reflects the primary characteristic of Indian speech making, that Indians chose their words carefully and placed great emphasis on remembering what was said.

In 1891, Four Guns and two fellow Oglala judges, Pine Tree and Running Wolf, were invited to dine with Clark Wissler, an anthropologist. After the dinner, Four Guns made a statement about oral traditions and the written word that reads, in part:

I have visited the Great Father in Washington. I have attended dinners among white people. Their ways are not our ways. We eat in silence, quietly smoke a pipe, and depart. Thus our host is honored. This is not the way of the white man. After his food has been eaten, one is expected to say foolish things. Then the host feels honored. Many of the white man's ways are past our understanding, but now that we have eaten at the White Man's table, it is fitting that we honor our host according to the ways of his people. Our host has filled many notebooks with the sayings of our fathers as they came down to us. This is the way of his people; they put great store upon writing; always there is a paper. But we have learned that there are many papers in Washington upon which are written promises to pay us for our lands; no white man seems to remember them. The Indian needs no writings; words that are true sink deep into his heart where they remain in silence; he never forgets them.
