= Julian Bear Runner =

Native American politician

43rd President of the Oglala Sioux Tribe
- In office December 7, 2018 – December 4, 2020
- Vice President: Darla Black (2018–19); Thomas Poor Bear (2019–20)
- Preceded by: Troy "Scott" Weston
- Succeeded by: Kevin Killer

Personal details
- Party: Democratic

Military service
- Allegiance: United States
- Branch/service: United States Army
- Years of service: 2008–2011

Julian R. Bear Runner is a former president of the Oglala Sioux Tribe from 2018 to 2020. When elected, Bear Runner was the second-youngest person ever elected as president of the tribe.

== Election ==
He was elected in 2018. At 33, he was the second-youngest person to ever be elected to the post. In 2020, he lost re-election to former state senator Kevin Killer.

== Policies ==
=== COVID-19 ===
Bear Runner responded forcefully to the COVID-19 pandemic, issuing lockdown and shelter in place orders. He also ordered checkpoints to be erected along state and federal highways that passed through the Pine Ridge reservation, to prevent the virus's spread to the people living there and to support contract tracing if an outside visitor was later found to be infected. This, plus similar actions from the Cheyenne River Sioux Tribe, led to a public fight with South Dakota governor Kristi Noem who demanded the checkpoints be removed and threatened to sue the Oglala and Cheyenne if they were not. Bear Runner refused, stating, "since she won't protect tribal health and safety, tribes have no choice but to take matters into their own hands." When the checkpoints were not removed, Noem repeated her demands but did not sue the tribes.

=== Marijuana legalization ===
Bear Runner supported a successful 2020 referendum to legalize marijuana for both medical and recreational use, citing the potential economy benefits. and the tribal council has set up regulations for the growth and use of marijuana.

=== Same-sex marriage ===
In 2019, the Oglala passed an ordinance to allow same-sex marriage. Bear Runner supported this ordinance; when anti-same-sex-marriage activists tried to put the ordinance up for a tribe-wide vote, Bear Runner cast the deciding "no" vote to preserve the same-sex marriage law.

== Controversies ==
=== Suspension ===
In July 2020, the Oglala tribal council suspended Bear Runner for 30 days. Bear Runner issued a COVID-19 lockdown order without informing the council and without being reachable by the council members to explain the order, leading to confusion. The suspension was with pay and did not lead to an impeachment vote.

=== Sexual Assault Allegations ===
In August 2020, a young Lakota man accused Bear Runner of coercing him into sex during the years the young man was 17 and 18 years old. Bear Runner denied the charges. The Oglala tribal council put Bear Runner on leave and held an impeachment vote. The vote was 11 in favor of removal, 5 against, and 5 abstentions, which was short of the 2/3rds majority needed to remove Bear Runner. News reports state that the FBI had also opened an investigation of Bear Runner over the assault allegations.

=== Arrests ===
In May 2020, Bear Runner was arrested on the Pine Ridge reservation for drunk driving and threatening a person. Later, in November 2020, Bear Runner was arrested for "failure to vacate" in Rapid City, South Dakota, after fighting with security at the Cheers Sports Bar & Casino. On 4 April 2024 Bear Runner was found guilty of stealing $80,000 between January 2019 and January 2020 (the money had been advanced for traveling expenses but was not used for this purpose).

Preceded by Troy "Scott" Weston	President of the Oglala Sioux Tribe; 2018–2020	Succeeded by Kevin Killer
