= Bryan Brewer =

Native American politician

President of the Oglala Sioux Tribe
- In office 2012–2014
- Preceded by: John Yellow Bird Steele
- Succeeded by: John Yellow Bird Steele

Personal details
- Born: Pine Ridge, South Dakota, U.S.

Bryan V. Brewer was president of the Oglala Sioux Tribe from 2012 to 2014.

== Presidency ==
Brewer has tried to end illegal alcohol sales near the reservation border, even joining a 2013 protest against alcohol sales in Whiteclay just outside the tribal borders. Brewer, along with Debra White Plume and other activists, formed a blockade to stop beer trucks from entering Whiteclay. Brewer was arrested on an unrelated warrant during the protests, but vowed to continue fighting against alcohol sales.

He also argued against lifting Pine Ridge's prohibition on alcohol.

== Controversies ==
In June 2014, Brewer was suspended and considered for impeachment by the tribal council for signing contracts without council approval and for mishandling a $5,000 donation. However, he was acquitted; in July, the council voted to not remove him and to not suspend him without pay.

== Post-presidency ==
In 2020, during the COVID-19 pandemic, he argued in favor of the checkpoints that the Oglala put up after South Dakota governor Kristi Noem demanded they be taken down.

== Personal life ==
Brewer was born in Pine Ridge, South Dakota on the Pine Ridge Indian Reservation. Brewer founded the popular Lakota Nation Invitational event. He is a veteran of the Vietnam War.

Preceded by John Yellow Bird Steele	President of the Oglala Sioux Tribe; 2012-2014	Succeeded by John Yellow Bird Steele
