= Lakota Nation Invitational =

Annual multi-sport event tournament

Coordinates: 43°18′18″N 100°38′30″W

- Abbreviation: LNI
- Formation: 1976
- Type: Volunteer; Non-profit organization
- Legal status: Association
- Purpose: Athletic/Educational
- Region served: South Dakota
- Members: 41 member high schools
- Official language: Lakota, English
- Board President: Chuck Wilson
- Staff: 20
- Website: Lakota Nation Invitational

The Lakota Nation Invitational is an annual multi-sport event tournament held each winter that began in 1976. The event takes place in the Rushmore Plaza Civic Center in Rapid City and hosts around 40 different schools from Indian Reservations in South Dakota, North Dakota, Nebraska and Wyoming. The event has categories including basketball, traditional Lakota hand games, knowledge and language bowls, a student art show, a business plan competition, wrestling, volleyball, cross country, archery, golf and a chess tournament.

== History ==
In 1976, the inaugural Lakota Nation Invitational (LNI) was held at Pine Ridge High School. The basketball tournament developed out of tensions resulting from the American Indian Movement’s occupation of Wounded Knee in 1973.

In 1973, Itancan Bryan Brewer was a basketball coach at Pine Ridge School. The American Indian Movement. wanted the U.S. government to honor the treaties, which, they believed, had been broken. The occupation, which included the site of the 1890 massacre, set off an intense dispute between A.I.M. supporters and a private paramilitary group funded by the existing tribal leadership, whom the A.I.M. had accused of corruption. In the three years following the seventy-one-day occupation, stabbings, shootings, and beatings related to the conflict became common, and by 1975, the impoverished Pine Ridge Indian Reservation had the highest murder rate in the United States.

Following American Indian Movement’s occupation, Athletic directors from school districts across South Dakota refused to let their athletes play basketball with students from Pine Ridge. Itancan Bryan Brewer decided to start a tournament of his own.

Brewer contacted schools in other states to play in the tournament. Seven schools agreed to compete in the 1976 tournament, which packed the Pine Ridge gymnasium. Three years later, the tournament relocated to the recently constructed Rushmore Plaza Civic Center Arena in order to better accommodate large crowds of spectators.

The tournament has seen significant growth and changes since its inception. Originally a gathering just for basketball games, the tournament now boasts a variety of events including traditional Lakota hand games, knowledge and language bowls, a student art show, a business plan competition and chess tournament.

== Events and coordinators ==
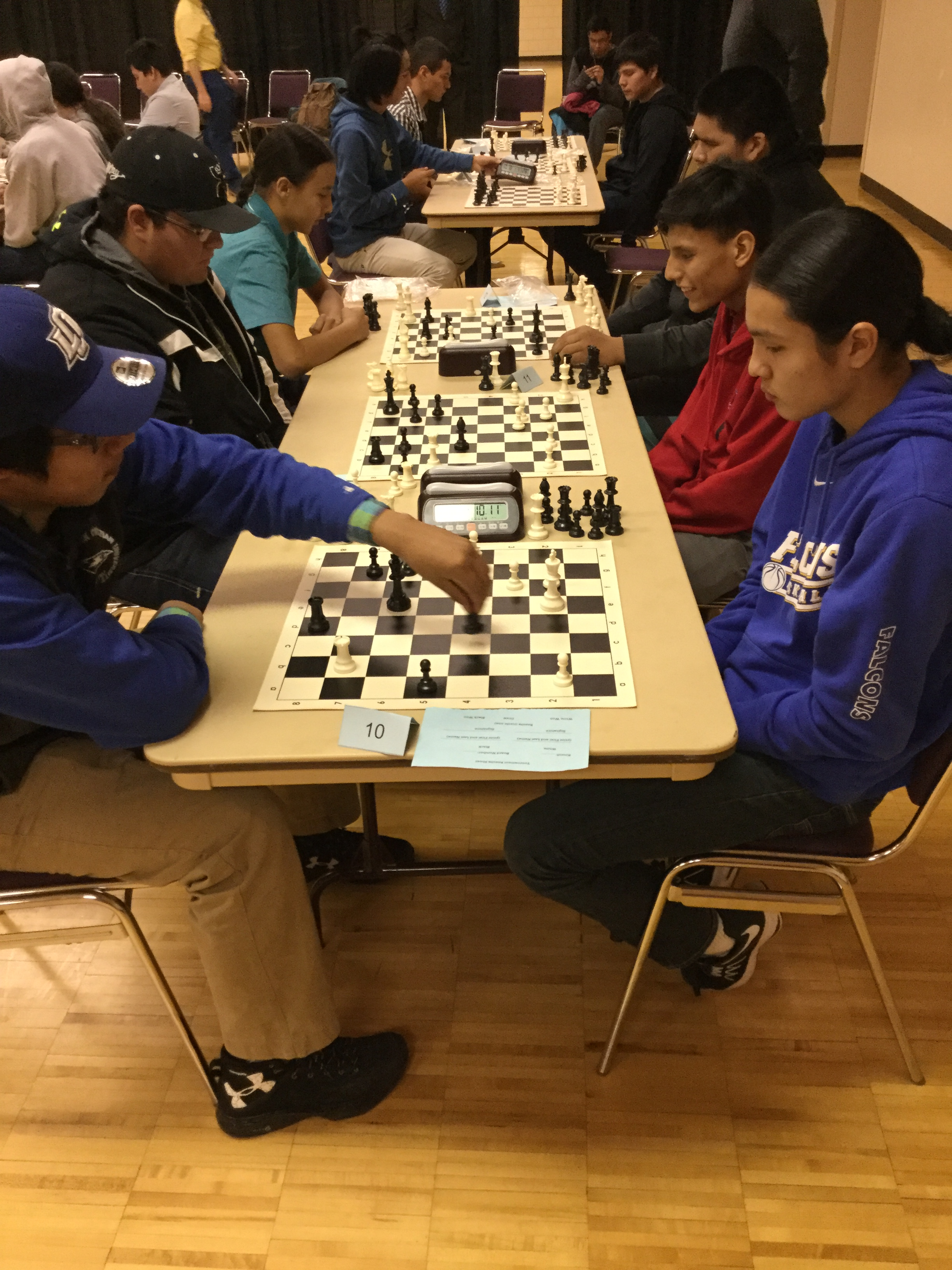
Lakota Nation Invitational Chess Tournament

- Event Founder: Itancan Bryan Brewer
- Board President: Chuck Wilson
- Lakota Language Bowl Coordinators: Philomine Lakota and Peter Hill
- Announcers Coordinator: Tiny DeCory
- Ads/Sponsorships Coordinator: Tonya Whirlwind Soldier
- Basketball Coordinator: David Dolan
- Activities Coordinator: Karla Cuny
- Student Workshop Coordinator:Dayna Brave Eagle
- Archery Competition Coordinator: Mike One Star
- Knowledge Bowl Coordinator: Yamni Jack
- Handgames Coordinator: Roger White Eyes
- Cheer Competition Coordinator: Jenifer Gayton Bowman
- Poetry Slam Coordinator: Autumn White Eyes and Ptesan Win Little Whiteman
- Youth Business Plan Coordinator: Angela Koenan
- Art Show Coordinator: Michael Poland
- Wrestling Coordinator: Jennifer Shaer
- Chess Competition Coordinator: Mike Beardt
- E-Sports Competition: Yamni Jack
- Golf Competition Coordinator: R. Ben Bordeaux
