= Alicia Mousseau =

Oglala Sioux leader and politician

Alicia Mousseau is the Vice President of the Oglala Sioux Tribe, whose lands include the Pine Ridge Indian Reservation. This is her second term in this position. She is reportedly the first lesbian to hold a position on her tribe's executive council.

== Early life and education ==
Mousseau is from Porcupine, South Dakota, and her parents are Howard Brown and Karen Spoonhunter-Brown from Arapahoe, Wyoming. Mousseau earned a PhD in 2012 from the University of Wyoming in Clinical Psychology. Mousseau went to Creighton University in Omaha, Nebraska, graduating with a BA in psychology and political science. She has worked with the University of Montana's College of Education at their National Native Children's Trauma Center. She has also worked for the University of Colorado in their research programs.

== Political career ==
In 2020, Mousseau ran for the position of Vice President of the Oglala Sioux Tribe. She ran against former Oglala Sioux Tribe President Bryan Brewer and won. Her campaign slogan was "Together We Can," to bring members of her community closer to each other.

In 2022, Mousseau was the incumbent and ran against three other candidates: Javan Tony Ten Fingers, Jackson Ten Fingers, and Mary Felicia. She won 1,431 votes, or 63% of the votes. She won 16 out of 17 precincts.

Mousseau seeks to help her community heal from past traumas and to help children in her tribe obtain the best education. She signed a resolution of support from a non-profit called Friends of the Children from Portland, Oregon. She is passionate about prevention and health equity within her tribe. Her efforts also include making sure that the LGBTQ+ community is safe.

She is part of the Democratic Party in South Dakota.

In late August 2024, Mousseau was arrested on charges of domestic violence and the sale and possession of alcohol.

== Awards and honors ==
In 2021, Mousseau was chosen to be an Aspen Institute Ascend Fellow for the work she is doing for her tribe. The work includes implementing prevention and intervention programs for Native American youth and families as well as expanding science programs to talk about trauma and healing informed care.

== See also ==
- List of Native American politicians
- Native American women in politics
