= Clark Wissler =

American anthropologist (1870–1947)

- Born: Clark David Wissler; September 18, 1870; Cambridge City, Indiana, US
- Died: August 25, 1947 (aged 76); New York City, US
- Education: Indiana University (BA, MA, LLD); Columbia University (PhD)
- Known for: North American ethnography
- Spouse: Etta Viola Gebhart (m. 1899)
- Children: 2
- Scientific career
- Fields: anthropologist; ethnologist; archaeologist
- Doctoral advisor: James McKeen Cattell

Clark David Wissler (September 18, 1870 – August 25, 1947) was an American anthropologist, ethnologist, and archaeologist.

== Early life ==
Clark David Wissler was born in Cambridge City, Indiana on September 18, 1870, to Sylvania (née Needler) and Benjamin Franklin Wissler. After graduating from Hagerstown High School, he taught in local schools between 1887 and 1892, and studied at Purdue University after the six-month school term ended. The following year in 1893 he was the principal of Hagerstown High School, and then he resigned his post and enrolled in Indiana University.

== Education ==
Wissler received a Bachelor of Arts in Experimental Psychology from Indiana University in 1897 and a Master of Arts in 1899. He continued his psychology graduate work under James McKeen Cattell at Columbia University. He received his Doctor of Philosophy in psychology from Columbia in 1901. From 1901 to 1903 Wissler performed research on individual mental and physical differences. Wissler's doctoral dissertation used the new Pearson correlation coefficient formula to show that there was no correlation between scores on Cattell's IQ tests and academic achievement. Wissler's dissertation eventually led the psychology movement to lose interest in psychophysical testing of intelligence.

In 1929, he received a LLD from Indiana University.

== Career ==
=== Early career ===
In 1897, he served as an instructor at Indiana University. From 1897 to 1899, he was an instructor at Ohio State University. In 1899 Wissler was appointed assistant in psychology at Columbia University. At Columbia, Wissler also served as an assistant professor of anthropology from 1903 to 1905 and as a lecturer from 1905 to 1909. Wissler was also an instructor at New York University from 1901 to 1902.

=== American Museum of Natural History ===
After Columbia, Wissler left the field of psychology to focus on anthropology. In 1902 he became an assistant in Ethnology at the American Museum of Natural History under Franz Boas. In 1904, Wissler was named Assistant Curator of Ethnology and in 1905, when Boas resigned, Wissler was named Acting Curator of Ethnology. The following year of 1906, he was named curator of the Department of Ethnology and in 1907 he was named curator of Anthropology when the Archaeology and Ethnology departments were recombined under the Department of Anthropology.

=== Yale University ===
In 1924 Wissler began teaching at Yale University as a psychological researcher until 1931 when he switched to an anthropology professor, which he held until 1941. Wissler held the position of Curator of the Department of Anthropology until 1942 when he retired.

=== Other accomplishments ===
He was division chairman of the National Research Council in 1920 and 1921. He was appointed as a member of the National Park Service Board by President Herbert Hoover. Wissler was elected to the American Academy of Arts and Sciences in 1920, the American Philosophical Society in 1924, and the United States National Academy of Sciences in 1929.

== Research ==
Clark Wissler performed his field research from 1902 until 1905 on the Dakota, Gros Ventre, and the Blackfoot. Wissler's fieldwork provided comprehensive ethnographies of each Native American culture, especially the Blackfoot. While Curator, Wissler funded ethnological and archaeological fieldwork of the Northern Plains and the Southwest. Wissler also "encouraged physical anthropology, built up collections of worldwide scope, planned exhibitions, and oversaw the publication of about thirty-eight volumes of the Anthropological Papers of the American Museum of Natural History."

Wissler's best contribution to anthropology is his culture area approach. "He was the first anthropologist to perceive the normative aspect of culture, to define it as learned behavior, and to describe it as a complex of ideas, all characteristics of culture that are today generally accepted." Wissler wanted to compare different cultures, but in order to do that he first needed to define what a culture is. The concept of culture area had been around before Wissler, but he redefined the concept so it could be used analytically. Wissler revolutionized the study of culture to a theory of cultural change and as an alternative to the Boasian style of anthropology. Wissler shifted the analytical focus away from the culture and history of a specific social unit to "a concern with the trait-complex viewed in cross cultural perspective." "The correspondence of a well-defined geographical area with a group of cultures that share many features is the basis of the concept of the culture area." Wissler states that the principal barriers that preserve the distinctness of a culture area as physical: surface, climate fauna, and flora. Wissler was trying to make cultural anthropology more scientific by forming a definition of culture that could be used to compare similar or different cultures. With a set of parameters for what a culture can be based upon, variables such as climate, environment, resources, food, water, and population size etc., researchers could now compare their studies of Plains Indians to their studies of Great Basin Indians. Wissler also helped introduce statistics with the Pearson correlation coefficient formula which could be used to compare different artifacts in relations to their geological location. This could help understand where a certain artifact, piece of pottery, or type of tool originated by testing if there is a high correlation of a certain artifact with sites in certain areas.

Clark Wissler was the first anthropologist to perceive the normative aspect of culture, to define it as learned behavior, and to describe it as a complex of ideas, all characteristics of culture that are today generally accepted. Wissler was a specialist in North American ethnography, focusing on the Indians of the Plains. He contributed to the culture area and age-area ideology of the diffusionist viewpoint that is no longer popular in anthropology. Ball State University in Muncie, Indiana holds the papers of Clark Wissler. Furthermore, one hall of Indiana University's Teter Living Center is known as "Clark Wissler Hall".

Clark Wissler's main area of research was on Native American cultures. His influence is overlooked because of other anthropologists like Franz Boas and Ruth Benedict. Wissler offered some new theories that were quite different from Boas, who was a leading cultural researcher. One of Wissler's new concepts was the belief in cultural diffusion and that culture was biologically innate in humans. "Wissler also came up with the age-area hypothesis that is a theory that the age of cultural traits may be determined by examining the distribution of these traits throughout the larger area where these traits are present." Wissler's Influence is still felt in anthropology today and he is credited for helping make the fields of cultural anthropology and psychology more scientific with analytical and statistical testing.

== Views on race and eugenics ==
Wissler was actively engaged in the American eugenics movement, a movement with the aim of purifying the American population of people with hereditary qualities deemed undesirable. He also was a proponent of a hierarchic racial theory that saw Africans as the lowest and Nordics as the highest rungs. This theory is today considered part and parcel of the early history of scientific racism.

== Personal life ==
Wissler married Etta Viola Gebhart of Hagerstown, Indiana on June 14, 1899. Together, they had a son and a daughter, Stanley Gebhart Wissler and Mary Viola Wissler.

== Death ==
Wissler died at Doctors Hospital in New York City on August 25, 1947.

== Selected books and articles ==
- Anthropological Papers of the American Museum of Natural History, Volume XI, Part 1 (Clark Wissler). 1913
- The American Indian (Clark Wissler). 1917. Oxford University Press, New York.
- North American Indians of the Plains (Clark Wissler). 1920. Smithsonian Institution, New York.
- Making Mankind (Clark Wissler, Fay Cooper Cole, William M. McGovern, et al.). 1929. D. Van Nostrand Company
- Star Legends (Clark Wissler). 1936. The American Museum of Natural History.
- Indian Cavalcade or Life on the Old-Time Indian Reservations (Clark Wissler). 1938. Sheridan House.
- Indian Costumes in the United States: A Guide to the Study of the Collections in the Museum (Clark Wissler).
- Man and Culture (Clark Wissler). 1940. Norwood Editions.
- Indians of the United States: Four Centuries of Their History and Culture (Clark Wissler). 1941. Doubleday and Company.
- A Blackfoot Source Book: Papers (Clark Wissler, David Hurst Thomas). 1986, Garland Pub.

== See also ==
- Four Guns
