= Jim Bradford (politician) =

American politician (1933–2020)

Member of the South Dakota Senate from the 27th district
- In office 2009–2017
- Preceded by: Theresa Two Bulls
- Succeeded by: Kevin Killer

Member of the South Dakota House of Representatives from the 27th district
- In office January 9, 2001 – January 13, 2009
- Preceded by: Larry Lucas
- Succeeded by: Kevin Killer

Personal details
- Born: October 18, 1933
- Died: November 16, 2020 (aged 87)
- Party: Democratic (2000–08; since 2010)
- Other political affiliations: Republican (2008–10)
- Profession: Rancher; Teacher (retired)

James Arnold Bradford (October 18, 1933 – November 16, 2020) was a rancher, teacher, politician and Democratic member of the South Dakota Senate, representing the 27th district between 2009 and 2017. He first was elected to office in the South Dakota House of Representatives. He was an Oglala Sioux.

== Career ==
Bradford had a career as a public school teacher before deciding to run for office. He lived on the Pine Ridge Indian Reservation, where he also had a ranch.

== Political career ==
Bradford was first elected to office as a Democratic member of the state House of Representatives.

In 2008, he switched parties to the Republican Party after having lost the Democratic primary to the incumbent Democratic senator Theresa Two Bulls. No Republican opposed him, and he narrowly won the election over Two Bulls by 277 votes. A year after winning re-election to the state senate, Bradford switched back to the Democratic Party.
