= Debra White Plume =

Native American activist

- Born: Debra Richard; August 20, 1954; Pine Ridge reservation
- Died: November 10, 2020 (aged 66); Rapid City, South Dakota
- Other name: Wioweya Najin Win
- Occupations: Native American activist founder, executive director of Owe Aku (Bring Back the Way)
- Spouse: Alex White Plume (m. 1988)
- Children: 9

Debra White Plume (Lakota: Wioweya Najin Win, August 20, 1954 – November 10, 2020) was a Lakota political activist and water protector. She fought to protect the traditional Oglala Lakota way of life.

== Biography ==
White Plume was born and raised on the Pine Ridge Reservation and was a member of the Oglala Lakota tribe. Her father was John Baptiste Reshaw, and her mother was Bernice Ione (Swallow) Stone.

In 1973, she was one of the first persons to join the American Indian Movement's Wounded Knee Occupation, which took place on her reservation in southwest South Dakota.

White Plume founded Owe Aku (Bring Back the Way) in 1999, an advocacy group dedicated to cultural preservation and protecting Lakota treaty rights through nonviolent direct action. She was the executive director of the group until her death. Her group also advocated for sobriety amongst Native Americans with the controversial slogan, "Sober Indian, Dangerous Indian," which she describes as the empowerment of oneself through traditional teachings with "a mind free of manipulation, and clear thinking that creates an Indian who dares to stand up for the rights of his or her people and the rights of Mother Earth."

In 2011, she was arrested outside the White House during a protest over the Keystone Pipeline project. In 2015, she was the lead plaintiff in a lawsuit against Cameco to stop it from expanding its operations at Crow Butte.

In 2016, she helped establish camps for protesters against the Dakota Access pipeline and played a leading role in organizing protests or nonviolent action against both the Keystone XL and Dakota Access Pipeline protests. She stated while at Standing Rock: "I'm Lakota, I'm a woman, and water is the domain of the women in our nation, and so it's our privilege and our obligation to protect water. If somebody wants to label me, I guess it would be water protector."

She died from cancer in Rapid City, South Dakota on November 10, 2020.
