= Cecilia Fire Thunder =

Native American leader (born 1946)

- Tawachin Waste Win

Oglala Sioux President leader
- In office November 2004 – June 29, 2006
- Preceded by: John Yellow Bird Steele
- Succeeded by: Alex White Plume

Personal details
- Born: Cecilia Apple; October 24, 1946 (age 80) Pine Ridge Reservation
- Party: Democratic
- Spouse: John Fire Thunder
- Relations: Six sisters: Shirley Murphy, Mary Hawk, Dinah Apple, Carmine Red Eagle, Joanne Apple, and Wanda Apple (Wanda is deceased). Grandparents, Frank and Theresa (Garcia) Apple, John and Mary (Ice) Featherman.
- Children: James and John Fire Thunder. Two granddaughters, Katie and Hannah Fire Thunder
- Parent(s): Stephen and Lollie (Featherman) Apple
- Education: Red Cloud Indian School,

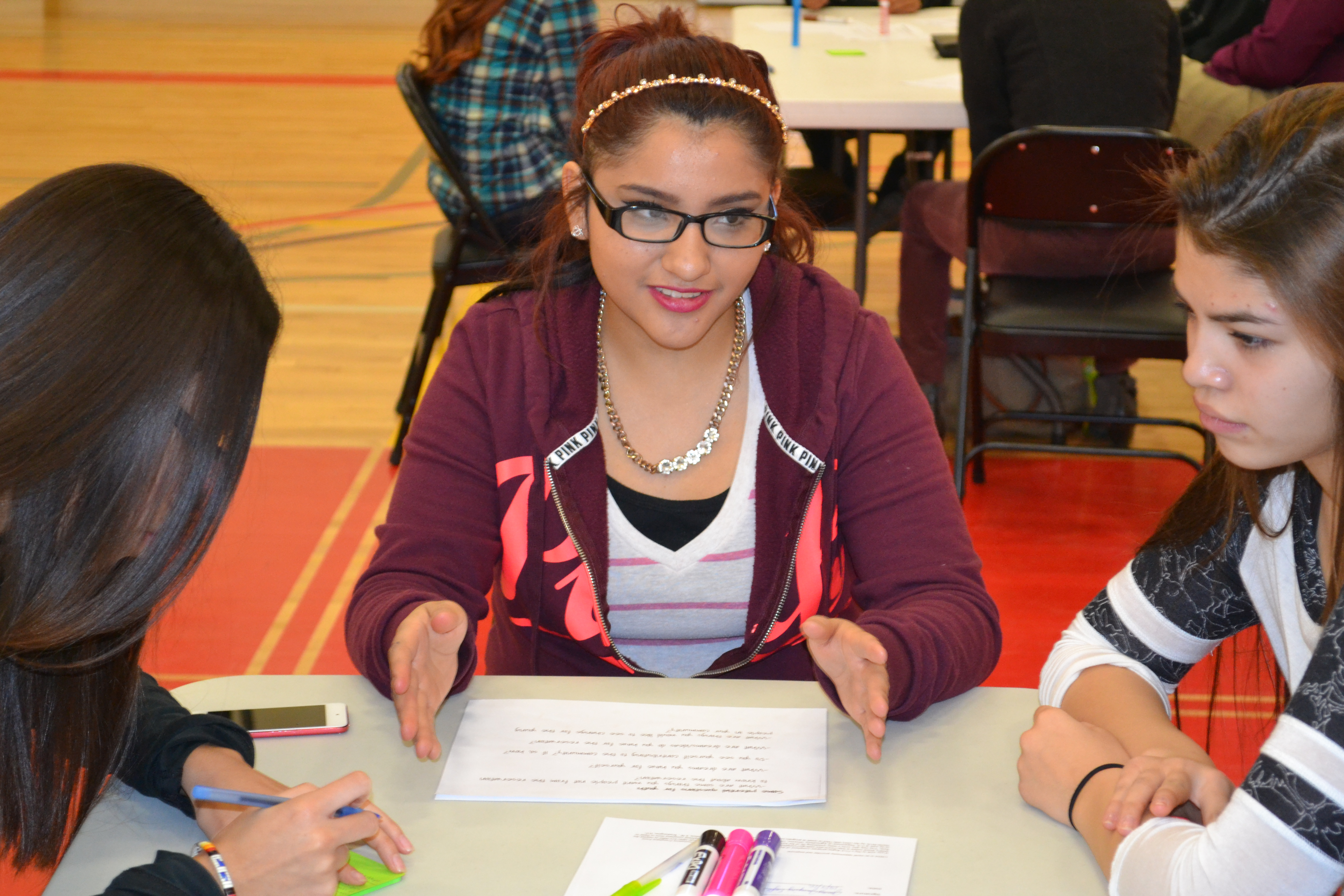
South Dakota Little Wound School students hold round table discussions on their vision of the future that Tribal elder Cecilia Fire Thunder facilitated.

Cecilia Fire Thunder (born Cecilia Apple; October 24, 1946) is a nurse, community health planner and tribal leader of the Oglala Sioux. On November 2, 2004, she was the first woman elected as president of the Tribe. She served until being impeached on June 29, 2006, several months short of the two-year term. The major controversy was over her effort to build a Planned Parenthood clinic on the reservation after the South Dakota legislature banned most abortions throughout the state. The tribal council impeached her for proceeding without gaining their consensus.

A founder of community-based health clinics while living and working in California for two decades, Fire Thunder was among founders of the Oglala Lakota Women's Society after her return to the reservation in 1986. She serves on the National Advisory Board of the National Organization on Fetal Alcohol Syndrome (NOFAS) and has worked at a shelter for domestic abuse. She is the coordinator of the Native Women's Society of the Great Plains.

== Early life and education ==
Born Cecilia Apple on October 24, 1946, on the Pine Ridge Reservation, she is the third of seven daughters of Stephen and Lollie (Featherman) Apple. Her father was a farmer who worked in agriculture and her mother a culture-keeper; the family spoke Lakota at home. Her grandparents are Frank and Theresa (Garcia) Apple and John and Mary (Ice) Featherman. Her sisters are Shirley Murphy, Mary Hawk, Dinah Apple, Carmine Red Eagle, Joanne Apple, and Wanda Apple (Wanda is deceased).

When Cecilia went to the Catholic Red Cloud Indian School, she had to speak English in class. The school forbid her from speaking Lakota. In 1963 her family moved from the reservation to Los Angeles, California, in a Bureau of Indian Affairs-sponsored urban relocation program. The BIA encouraged Native American migration to cities to take advantage of educational and job opportunities. Before she went back to the reservation, Cecilia had her children and divorced her husband. Due to being a single mother, she had help from a social worker who got Cecilia into a nursing program. Once she passed the state board test, that is when her life working in health care began. In 1986, Cecilia returned to the Pine Ridge Reservation, where she was given the Lakota name of Good Hearted Woman for her services and advocacy for Native American healthcare.

== Marriage and family ==
Apple married John Fire Thunder while living in Los Angeles, and they had two sons, James and John Fire Thunder. She has two granddaughters from her son John, Katie and Hannah Fire Thunder. Cecilia and John divorced soon after their sons were born.

== Organizations and affiliations ==
As a young nurse in California, Fire Thunder started community-based health clinics at in Los Angeles and San Diego at the San Diego American Indian Health Center, learning to work in a different culture and to seek resources locally. She was able to persuade doctors from the University of Southern California and the University of California Los Angeles to donate time to the clinic.

After more than 20 years away, in 1986 Fire Thunder returned to the Pine Ridge Reservation and started work at the Bennett County Hospital. She was among the founders of the Oglala Lakota Women's Society. From her years working as a nurse, she had learned of the physical, developmental and learning problems for children born to alcoholic mothers, and encouraged women to get preventive treatment. She serves on the National Advisory Board of the National Organization on Fetal Alcohol Syndrome (NOFAS), founded in 1990. In her work for Cangleska, Inc., a domestic violence shelter, she also dealt with women who suffered from abuse related to poverty and alcoholism on the reservation.

A Lakota native speaker, Fire Thunder has also been active in tribal efforts to recover and revive use of the Lakota language among its young people and adults. She sees use of the language as integral to their culture.

Cecilia joined a political conference called the National Congress of American Indians. She joined to talk about the issues they faced as natives and ways to change the current policies.

== Tribal presidency ==
On November 2, 2004, Cecilia Fire Thunder was elected as the first female president of the Oglala Sioux Tribe of the Pine Ridge Reservation to serve the two-year term. She defeated both Russell Means, notable as an activist in the American Indian Movement (AIM), and the incumbent John Yellow Bird Steele. In 2005 the tribal council suspended her, initially for 20 days, in an action that ran to 66 days. They began impeachment proceedings related to allegations that she used tribal land as collateral for a US$38 million loan from the Shakopee Tribe in Minnesota to help pay off short-term debt of the Oglala tribe that totaled $20 million; the remainder of the loan was invested for casino expansion to generate revenue. Fire Thunder said the allegations were false, and she had openly negotiated the loan as part of straightening out the tribe's financial status. After the complaint was dismissed by the council on December 30, Fire Thunder returned to her position.

In 2005 Nebraska state officials, Attorney General and Congressman Tom Osborne, approached the OST tribal council suggesting collaboration for increased policing at Whiteclay, Nebraska, a perennial problem because of its extensive beer sales to people from the Pine Ridge Indian Reservation. Possession and consumption of alcohol is illegal at the reservation, but alcoholism is widespread, contributing to many social and health problems. In a unique agreement, the state proposed to deputize OST police (additional staff to be hired) to patrol Whiteclay to prevent beer from being transported to the reservation. Initially the council rejected the proposal, saying the $100,000 grant would be insufficient. It later approved the measure.

In March 2006 Fire Thunder announced her intent to create a Planned Parenthood clinic on her own land, within the reservation. She was responding to the state legislature's passage of a law banning virtually all abortions within South Dakota. She believed that her constituents needed full family planning services, and that the sovereign reservation would not be subject to state laws. In 2004 public opinion polls had shown that 68% of people surveyed in South Dakota supported options for abortions in some cases, so the new law generated controversy across the state.

Fire Thunder's plan attracted widespread media coverage and controversy within the reservation. Some tribal members marched in protest in May 2006 against the planned clinic; others objected to the way Fire Thunder had proceeded. At their council meeting on May 31, 2006, the Oglala Sioux tribal Council suspended Fire Thunder from her duties as president, saying she had not gained their consensus before inviting Planned Parenthood to the reservation. In addition, the Council issued a ban on all abortions on tribal land.

A month after the suspension, the tribal council voted on June 29, 2006, to impeach Fire Thunder from her duties as Tribal President. They made six charges against her, notably related to the Planned Parenthood clinic, for which they said she had not gained tribal council consensus. Other charges were that Fire Thunder used the media, the U.S. Post Office and the Oglala Sioux Tribe to solicit funds for the clinic. On June 30, 2006, Alex White Plume, tribal vice-president, assumed the role of President Pro Tem, which he held until the November 2006 election. This story was featured in the 2013 PBS documentary Young Lakota.

The council and succeeding chief never organized to spend the federal grant money to support deputized police to patrol at Whiteclay, and the funds were rescinded in late 2007. During the same period, in 2006 and 2007 tribal activists held blockades on the road inside the reservation to prevent beer from being brought from Whiteclay and continued to demand action by Nebraska.

Fire Thunder challenged the impeachment decision, but was unsuccessful. As of 2010, she is the coordinator of the Native Women's Society of the Great Plains.

== Impeachment Trial ==
The trial of impeachment for Cecilia started on June 29, 2006. There was documentation titled “Documents to support complaint calling for the impeachment of OST (Oglala Sioux Tribe) President, Cecelia Fire Thunder" about Cecilia presented by 2 pine Ridge District councilmen. During the trial she was told that she had six charges against her, but the councilmen only voted on one charge and that was what they all talked about during the trial; “[She] invited federal and state law onto our sovereign reservation by challenging the new state abortion law, to begin her own abortion clinic, under the auspices of the Oglala Sioux Tribe.” The letter of suspension that was written educated her about how she could not "... she would not conduct any business in the name of the OST, was banned from discussing her case with media (on or off the reservation), that no further contributions would be accepted, that any monies received for the clinic would be returned, and that she could not travel on behalf of the tribe". This then led the OST Tribal Council to create an ordinance.

The ordinance included:

"ORDINANCE OF THE OGLALA SIOUX TRIBAL COUNCIL PROHIBITING ANY HEALTH

CARE FACILITY LOCATED WITHIN THE EXTERNAL BOUNDARIES OF THE PINE

RIDGE INDIAN RESERVATION AS DEFINED UNDER ARTICLE I OF THE OGLALA

SIOUX TRIBE CONSTITUTION FROM PERFORMING AN ABORTION IRRESPECTIVE

OF WHETHER THE HEALTH OF THE PREGNANT MOTHER IS AT RISK OR WHETHER

THE UNBORN CHILD IS CONCEIVED OF [sic] THROUGH RAPE OR INCEST."

After the ordinance was created, there was a lot of controversy about Fire Thunder and the media had mixed thoughts on her. Some were saying that she was an "evildoer" or a "darling". She was mostly portrayed in the media in a more negative light than a positive one. There was an instance where her name was made fun of by CNN's Glenn Beck. He made fun of her name and most other natives names and also said some awful things about their sovereignty. He was just blatantly rude to the whole tribe. Cecilia was not able to respond to any of this because she was denied her rights to freedom of speech by the OST council.

After the incident with the magazines, the trial began and things got heated fast. Cecilia thought that she had not been given enough time to respond the allegations and believed she had not committed any malfeasance. During the trial, she was reading from the passage Spirituality is our Culture and Walking with the Teachings of the White Buffalo Calf Woman . She read a specific part that said '"restoring value to life = responsibility = accountability = ownership'". When Fire Thunder read this, two of the council men got up and left the room with their backs turned. The conclusion of the trial resulted with her being impeached and not letting her stay the last 5 months in office when she wanted to.

== Legacy and honors ==
Because of her groundbreaking election as president of the Oglala Sioux Tribe and work on women's issues, Fire Thunder has frequently been invited to speak at universities and groups about Lakota women and her experiences, as seen in the following:

- March 2010, Women's History Month, New York University, Center for the Study of Gender and Sexuality
- September 2010, Tribal Leaders Summit, Bismarck, North Dakota - speaking on issues of domestic violence and concentrating resources for children

Preceded by John Yellow Bird Steele	President of the Oglala Sioux Tribe; 2004-2006 (impeached)	Succeeded by Alex White Plume

== See also ==
- List of Native American politicians
- Native American women in politics
