= Oglala Lakota College =

Public tribal land-grant college in Kyle, South Dakota, U.S.

Coordinates: 43.366°N 102.241°W

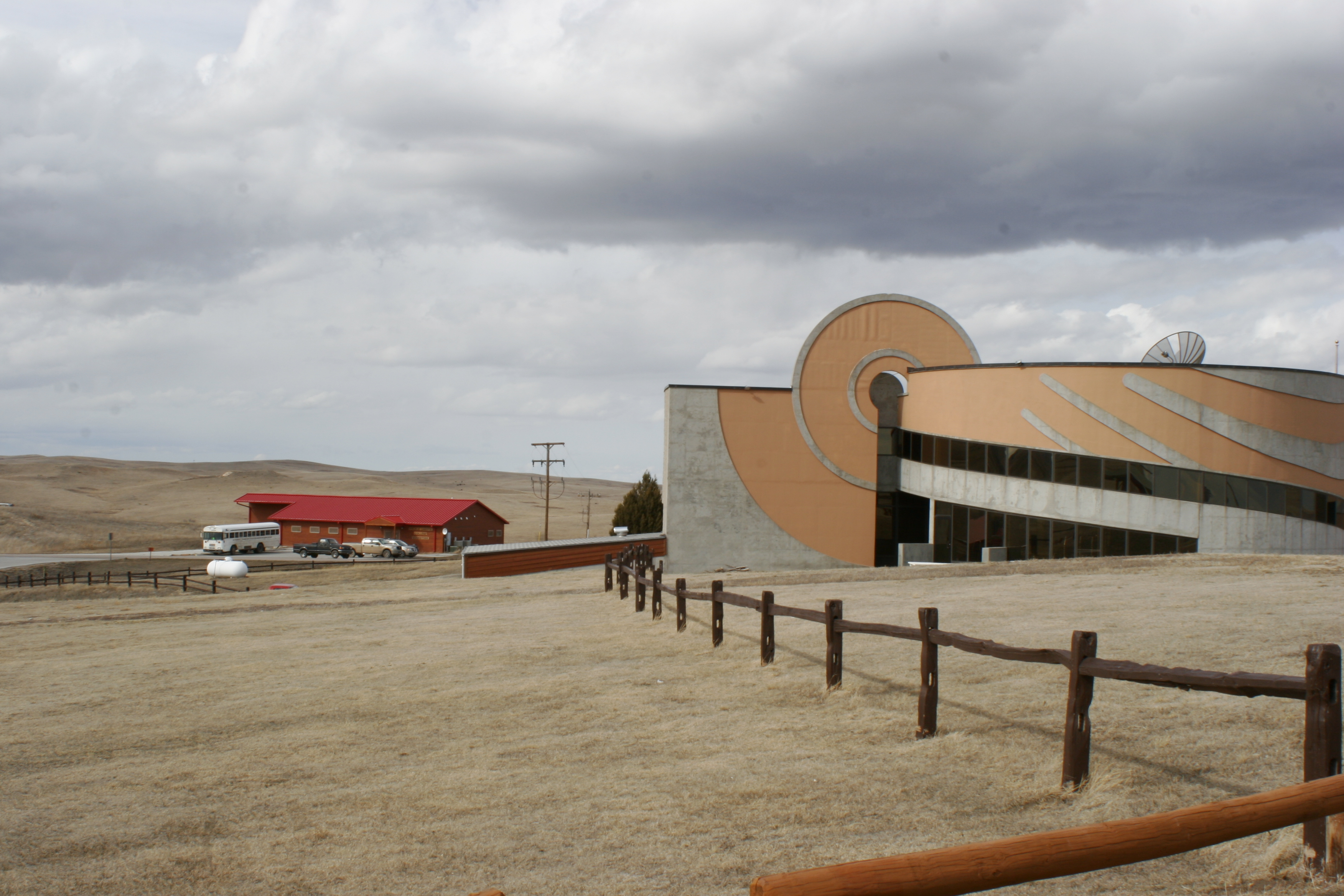
- Oglala Lakota College in Kyle, South Dakota
- Former names: Lakota Higher Education Center (1971–1978); Oglala Sioux Community College (1978–1983)
- Motto: Rebuilding the Lakota Nation through Education
- Type: Public tribal land-grant community college
- Established: 1971; 55 years ago
- Academic affiliations: AIHEC, Space-grant
- President: Dawn Frank
- Students: 1,400
- Location: Kyle, Oglala Lakota County, South Dakota, United States
- Campus: Urban/suburban reservation on the Pine Ridge Indian Reservation
- Nickname: Bravehearts
- Website: www.olc.edu

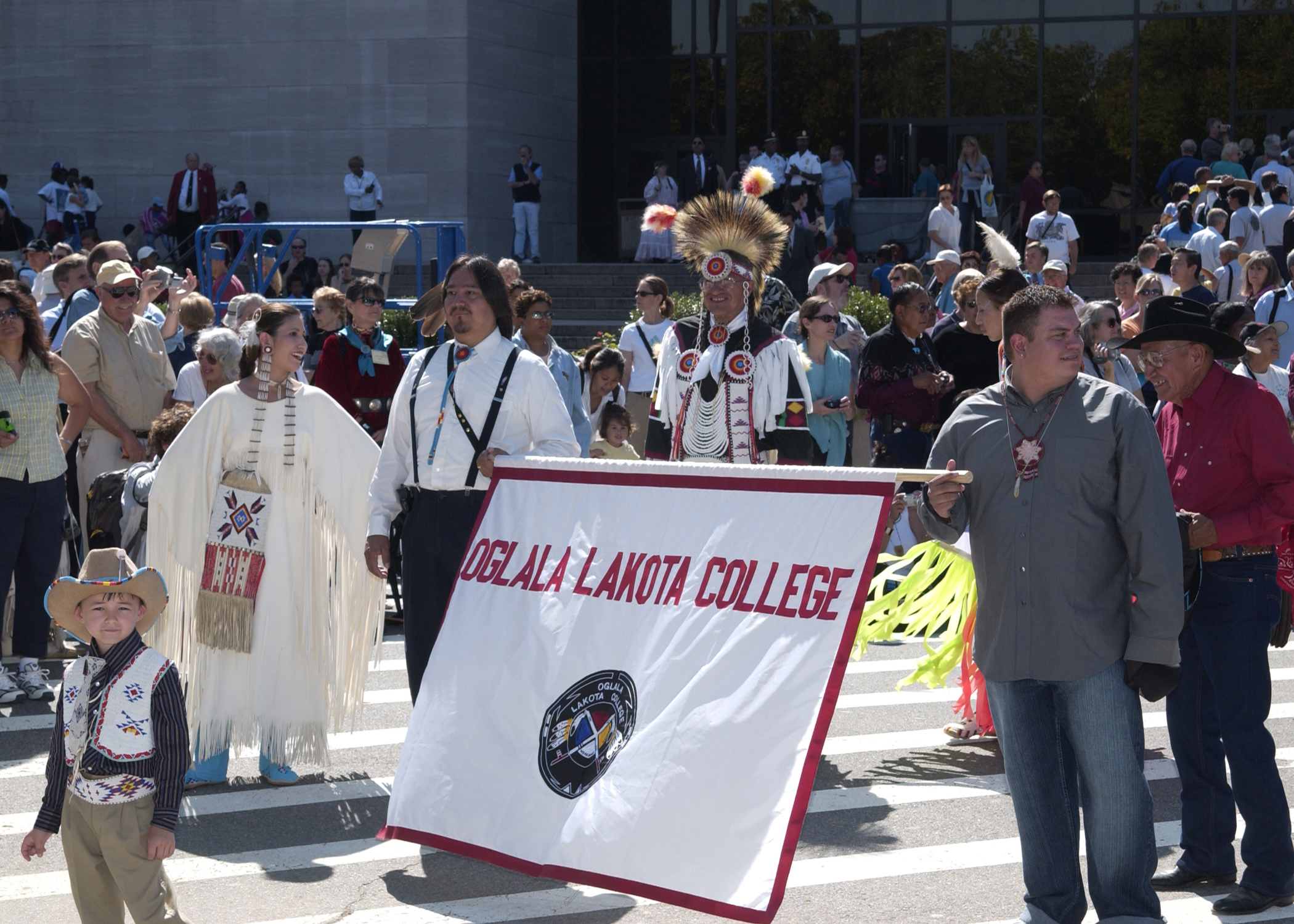
Marchers from Oglala Lakota College celebrating the opening of the National Museum of the American Indian in Washington, D.C., September 21, 2004.

Oglala Lakota College (OLC) is a public tribal land-grant community college in Kyle, South Dakota. It enrolls 1,456 students enrolled part- and full-time. OLC serves the Pine Ridge Indian Reservation, which has a population of about 26,000 and covers 3,468 square miles in southwestern South Dakota.

== History ==
OLC is chartered by the Oglala Sioux Tribal Council in 1971. In 1994, the college was designated a land-grant college alongside 31 other tribal colleges.

== Governance ==
OLC is governed by a 13-member board of trustees.

== Campus ==
OLC has a decentralized campus system. There are OLC instructional centers in each of the nine districts across Pine Ridge Reservation in South Dakota. There are college instructional centers in Rapid City and on the Cheyenne River Indian Reservation.

== Academics ==
Undergraduate demographics as of Fall 2023
Race and ethnicity	Total
American Indian/Alaska Native	97%
White	2%
Two or more races	1%
Economic diversity
Low-income (Note: The percentage of students who received an income-based federal Pell grant intended for low-income students.)	50%
Affluent (Note: The percentage of students who are a part of the American middle class at the bare minimum.)	50%

From its initial status as a community college, Oglala Lakota has grown to now offer Baccalaureate degrees and a master's degree in Lakota Leadership along with certificates and A.A. degrees. OLC is accredited by the Higher Learning Commission to offer degrees at the associate's, bachelor's, and master's levels. Education graduates are certified by the South Dakota Division of Education. OLC nursing graduates are certified by the South Dakota State Board of Nursing and eligible to sit for the registered nurse examination. The social work program is accredited at the bachelor's degree level.

== Partnerships ==
OLC is a member of the American Indian Higher Education Consortium (AIHEC), which is a community of tribally and federally chartered institutions working to strengthen tribal nations and make a lasting difference in the lives of American Indians and Alaska Natives. OLC was created in response to the higher education needs of American Indians. OLC generally serves geographically isolated populations that have no other means accessing education beyond the high school level.
