= Oglala =

Traditional tribal grouping within the Lakota people

Oglála Lakhóta Oyáte

Total population
- 46,855 enrolled tribal members (2019)

Regions with significant populations
- United States (South Dakota)

Languages
- Lakota, English

Religion
- Traditional tribal religion, Sun Dance, Native American Church, Christianity

Related ethnic groups
- other Lakota peoples, Dakota, Nakota

The Oglala (Lakota pronunciation: [ɔɡəˈlala] – lit. 'to scatter one's own') are one of the seven subtribes of the Lakota people who, along with the Dakota, make up the Očhéthi Šakówiŋ (Seven Council Fires). A majority of the Oglala live on the Pine Ridge Indian Reservation in South Dakota, the eighth-largest Native American reservation in the United States.

The Oglala are a federally recognized tribe whose official title is the Oglala Sioux Tribe of the Pine Ridge Reservation, South Dakota.

== History ==
Oglala elders relate stories about the origin of the name "Oglala" and their emergence as a distinct group, probably sometime in the 18th century.

=== Conflict with European settlers ===
In the early 19th century, Europeans and Americans passed through Lakota territory in increasing numbers. They sought furs, especially beaver fur at first, and later bison fur. The fur trade changed the Oglala economy and way of life.

In 1868, the United States and the Great Sioux Nation signed the Fort Laramie Treaty. In its wake, the Oglala became increasingly polarized over how they should react to continued American encroachment on their territory. This treaty forfeited large amounts of Oglala land and rights to the United States in exchange for food and other necessities. Some Lakota bands turned to the Indian agencies — institutions that later served Indian reservations – for rations of beef and subsistence foods from the US government. Other bands held fast to indigenous lifeways. Many Lakota bands moved between these two extremes, coming in to the agencies during the winter and joining their relatives in the north each spring. These challenges further split the various Oglala bands.

The influx of white settlers into the Idaho Territory often meant passing through Oglala territory, and, occasionally, brought with it its perils, as Fanny Kelly described in her 1871 book, Narrative of My Captivity among the Sioux Indians.

=== Early reservation ===
The Great Sioux Reservation was broken up into six smaller reservations. This caused the Red Cloud Agency to be moved multiple times throughout the 1870s until it was relocated and renamed the Pine Ridge Reservation in 1878. By 1890, the reservation included 5,010 people, divided into a number of districts that included some 30 distinct communities.

=== Contemporary reservation ===
In October 2019, they became a signatory of the Buffalo Treaty.

==== 2022 temporary Christian missions suspension ====
In July 2022, the Oglala Sioux Tribal Council effected a temporary suspension of Christian missions on the Pine Ridge Reservation. The council called for an investigation into the financial practices of the Dream Center Missionary, and the Jesus is King Mission was ejected from the reservation for spreading pamphlets that the tribe saw as hateful.

==== Members detained by Immigration and Customs Enforcement ====
During the protests against Immigration and Customs Enforcement in Minneapolis after the killing of Renée Good, five tribally enrolled citizens of the Oglala Lakota nation were detained. Tribal President Frank Star released a statement on January 9, 2026 saying that five enrolled members were taken into custody near the Little Earth housing complex in Minneapolis. President Star noted that the arrest did not have any legal merit because the Indian Citizenship Act of 1924 asserts that all Native people born within the territorial limits of the United States are recognized as US citizens by birthright. At the time, one tribal member's arrest was video recorded and he was subsequently released, and the location of the other four members was unknown. Minnesota Lieutenant Governor Peggy Flanagan responded to the arrest by telling local media that she believed the detentions reflected racial profiling.

As of January 14, 2026, one of the four missing men was released and the remaining three were located at the ICE detention center at Fort Snelling. This added to the historical significance of colonial acts as it is the site of the government once used to imprison hundreds of Indigenous Americans during and after the Dakota War of 1862. The United States Department of Homeland Security released the first names of the missing men to the Oglala Sioux Tribe, but refused to release further information unless the tribe "entered into an immigration agreement with ICE".

== Social organization ==
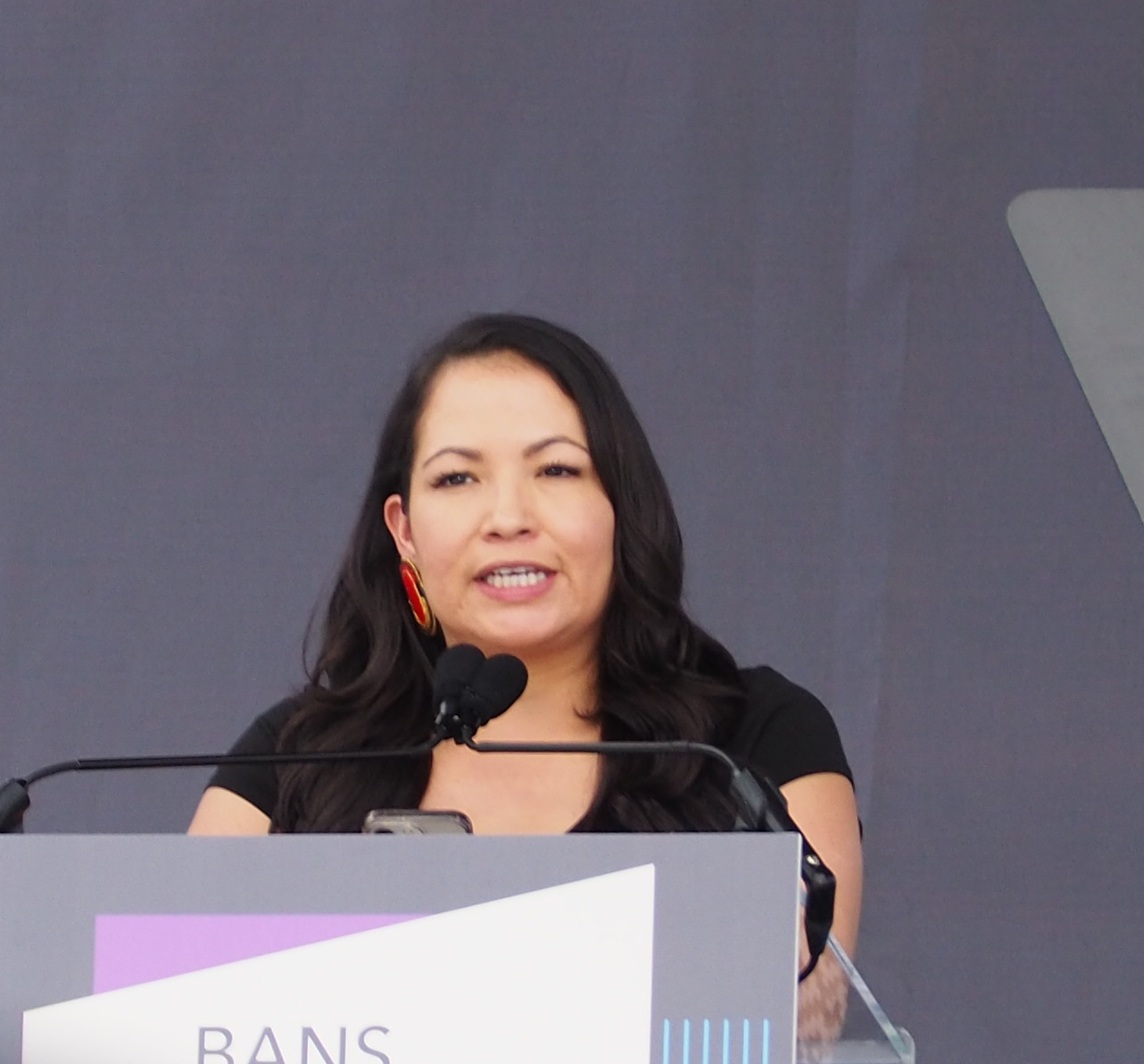
Sarah Eagle Heart (Oglala Lakota), Emmy-award winning producer, author, and activist

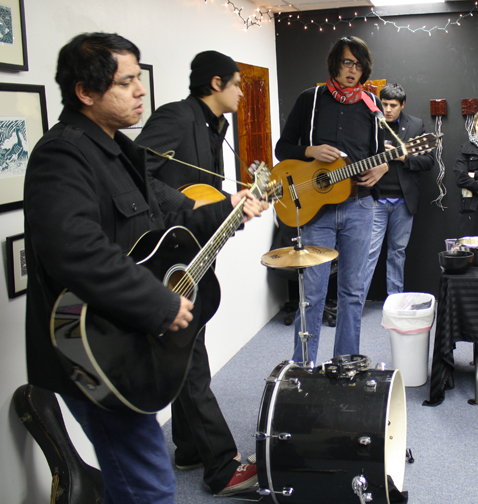
The Wake Singers, band of Oglala Lakota musicians

The respected Oglala elder Left Heron once explained that before the coming of the White Buffalo Calf Woman, "the people ran around the prairie like so many wild animals," not understanding the central importance of community. Left Heron emphasized that not only did this revered spirit woman bring the Sacred Pipe to the tribe but she also taught the Lakota people many valuable lessons, including the importance of family (tiwahe) and community (tiyospaye). The goal of promoting these two values then became a priority, and in the words of Dakota anthropologist Ella Cara Deloria, "every other consideration was secondary—property, personal ambition, glory, good times, life itself. Without that aim and the constant struggle to attain it, the people would no longer be Dakotas in truth. They would no longer even be human." This strong and enduring connection between related families profoundly influenced Oglala history.

=== Community (Tiyóšpaye) ===
Dr. John J. Saville, the U.S. Indian agent at the Red Cloud Agency, observed in 1875 that the Oglala tribe was divided into three main groups: the Kiyuksa, the Oyuĥpe and the True Oglala. "Each of these bands are subdivided into smaller parties, variously named, usually designated by the name of their chief or leader." As the Oglala were settled on the Pine Ridge Reservation in the late 1870s, their communities probably looked something like this:

Oyuȟpe Tiyóšpaye

- True Oyuȟpe (Big Road's band). Other members include: Black Elk
- Wakaŋ
- Makaicu (Red Dog's band)

Oglala Tiyóšpaye

- True Oglala
- Čhaŋkȟáhu Ȟáŋ ("Sore back"; He Dog's band). Other members include: Short Bull; Amos Bad Heart Bull.
- Hokayuta (Black Twin's band)
- Huŋkpatila (Little Hawk and Crazy Horse's band)
- Ité šíčA (Red Cloud's band)
- Payabya (They Even Fear His Horses's band)
- Wágluȟe (Chief Blue Horse, American Horse and Three Bear's band)

Kiyaksa Tiyóšpaye

- True Kiyaksa
- Kuinyan (Little Wound's band)
- Tapišleca (Yellow Bear's band)

=== Population ===
By 1830, the Oglala had around 3,000 members. In the 1820s and 1830s, the Oglala, along with the Brulé, another Lakota band, and three other Sioux bands, formed the Sioux Alliance. This Alliance attacked surrounding tribes for territorial and hunting reasons.

== Culture ==
=== Gender roles ===
Historically, women have been crucial to the family's life: making almost everything used by the family and tribe. They have cultivated and processed a variety of crops; prepared the food; prepared game and fish; worked skins to make clothing and footwear, as well as storage bags, the covering of tipis, and other items. Women have historically controlled the food, resources and movable property, as well as owned the family's home.

Typically, in the Oglala Lakota society, the men are in charge of the politics of the tribe. The men are usually the chiefs for political affairs, war leaders and warriors, and hunters. Traditionally, when a man marries, he goes to live with his wife with her people.

== Oglala flag ==
Oglala flag in use since 1961

The Oglala flag's red field symbolizes the blood shed by the Sioux in defense of their lands and the very idea of the "red men". A circle of eight white tepees, tops pointing outward, represents the eight districts of the reservation: Porcupine, Wakpammi, Medicine Root, Pass Creek, Eagle Nest, White Clay, LaCreek, and Wounded Knee (FBUS, 260-262). When used indoor or in parades, the flag is decorated with a deep-blue fringe to incorporate the colors of the United States into the design.".

"The flag was first displayed at the Sun Dance ceremonies in 1961 and officially adopted on 9 March 1962. Since then it has taken on a larger role, perhaps because of its age, clear design, and universal symbolism. The Oglala flag is now a common sight at Native American powwows, not just Sioux gatherings, and is often flown as a generic Native American flag."

The flag pictured is the original not the current OST Flag.

== Notable Oglala ==
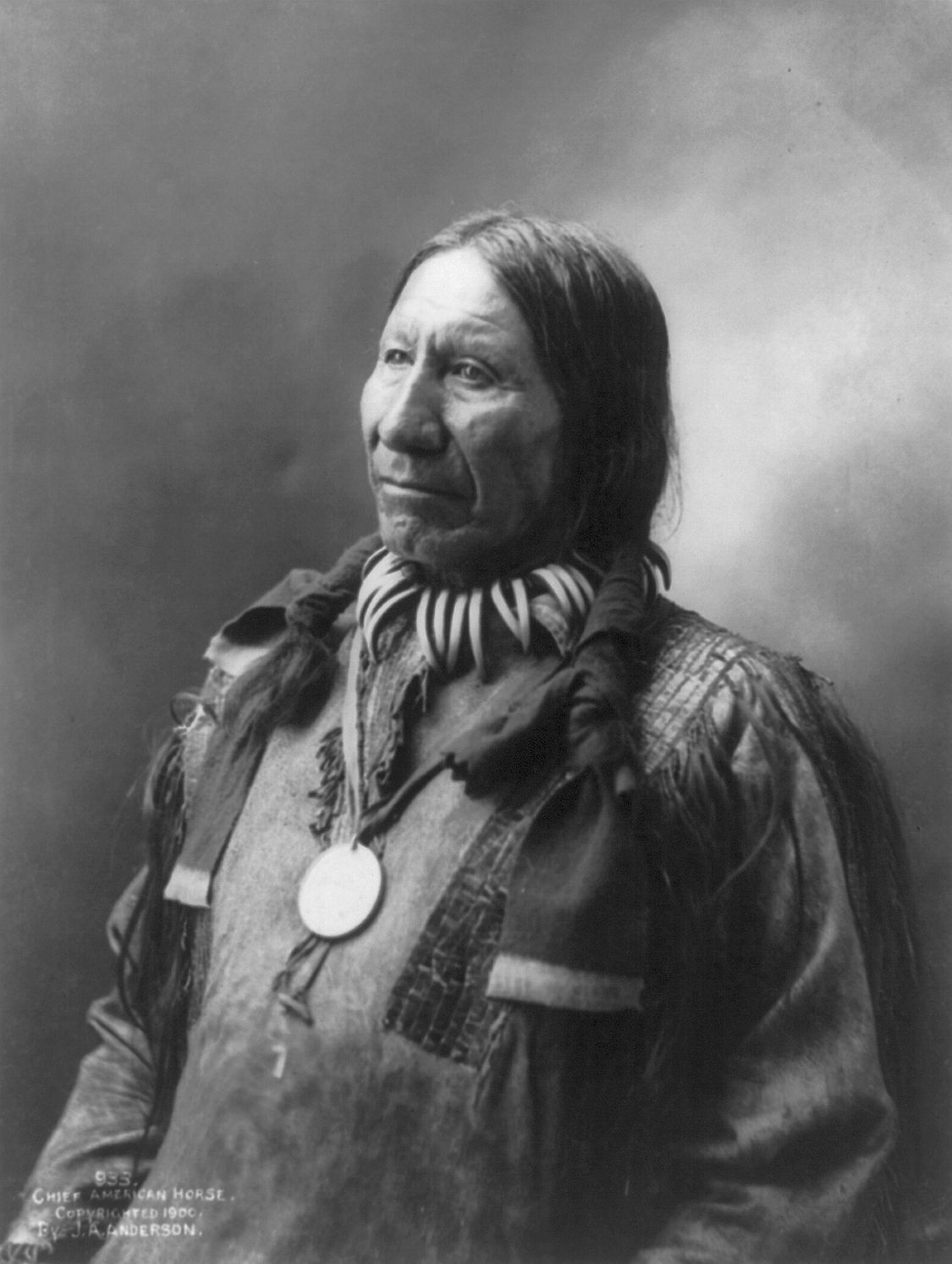
American Horse "The Younger"

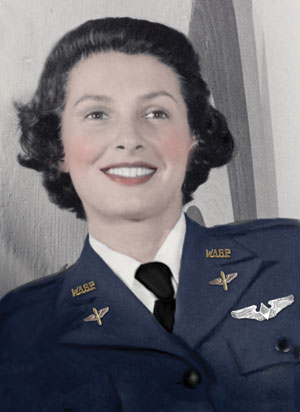
Ola Mildred Rexroat, the only Native American pilot in the Women Airforce Service Pilots (WASP)

=== Leaders ===
- American Horse (The Younger)
- American Horse (The Elder)
- Ohitika (Brave)
- Bryan Brewer
- Crazy Horse
- Low Dog
- Crow Dog (Kangisanka)
- Kicking Bear
- Little Wound
- Old Chief Smoke (Šóta)
- Red Cloud
- Iron Tail
- Flying Hawk
- Big Mouth
- Cecilia Fire Thunder
- Theresa Two Bulls
- They Even Fear His Horses (Tȟašúŋke Kȟokípȟapi)
- Black Elk
- Red Shirt (Oglala)
- Luther Standing Bear
- Henry Standing Bear
- Russell Means (Oyate Wacinyapin)
- John Yellow Bird Steele
- Steve Livermont

=== Military personnel ===
- Ed McGaa – Korean and Vietnam War veteran
- Ola Mildred Rexroat – WASP, World War II

=== Artists ===
- Imogene Goodshot Arquero, beadwork artist
- Arthur Amiotte, mixed-media artist
- Amos Bad Heart Bull
- Kicking Bear, ledger artist
- Mo Brings Plenty, TV actor famous for Yellowstone

=== Poets ===
- Layli Long Soldier

=== Storytellers ===
- Albert White Hat
- John Fire Lame Deer, Medicine Man

=== Athletes ===
- Billy Mills, Olympic champion (1964)
- Teton Saltes, professional football player signed by the New York Jets of the NFL (2021)
- SuAnne Big Crow, basketball player for Pine Ridge High School
- Arianna Holiday, Indian Relay rider for Brew Crew (Indian Relay team)

=== Performers ===
- Albert Afraid of Hawk – member of Buffalo Bill's Wild West Show who died and was buried in Danbury, Connecticut, while on tour in 1900. His remains were exhumed and re-interred on Pine Ridge Reservation in 2012.

=== Culinary activists ===
- Sean Sherman (Pine Ridge, South Dakota), co-author of The Sioux Chef's Indigenous Kitchen

== See also ==
- Sicaŋǧu, Brulé (Burned Thighs)
- Itazipco, Sans Arc (No Bows)
- Huŋkpapa (End of Village)
- Miniconjou (Swamp Plant)
- Sihasapa (Blackfoot Sioux)
- O'ohenuŋpa (Two Kettles)
- Four Guns
