= Holbrook Radar Bomb Scoring Site =

Former USAF installation in Navajo County, Arizona

Coordinates: 34.9379°N 110.1358°W

Holbrook Radar Bomb Scoring Site (call sign Holbrook Bomb Plot) is a Formerly Used Defense Site of 8 acres (3.2 ha) near Winslow, Arizona, that was used as a Cold War Strategic Air Command radar station for the Holbrook Radar Bomb Scoring Range. Detachment 2 of the Radar Bomb Scoring Division transferred its personnel and equipment from the South Dakota Interior Radar Bomb Scoring Site (call sign Badlands Bomb Plot) Spring 1968. The site had a housing area, and after the division became the 1st Electronic Combat Range Group (1ECRG), in August 1989 the detachment and site transferred from the 1ECRG to the 99th Strategic Weapons Wing.

"The last ECM-only sortie" scored by the site was c. September 30, 1993 by a C-130 Hercules from Hurlburt Field, and Holbrook's detachment merged with Detachment 19 from the Poplar, Montana, site to become Detachment 4 at Harrison, Arkansas. In 1993, "part of Holbrook Radar Bomb Scoring Site [was] conveyed to the National Park Service" (Petrified Forest National Park).
