= Great Sioux Reservation =

Former Indian reservation in the United States

- Indian reservation
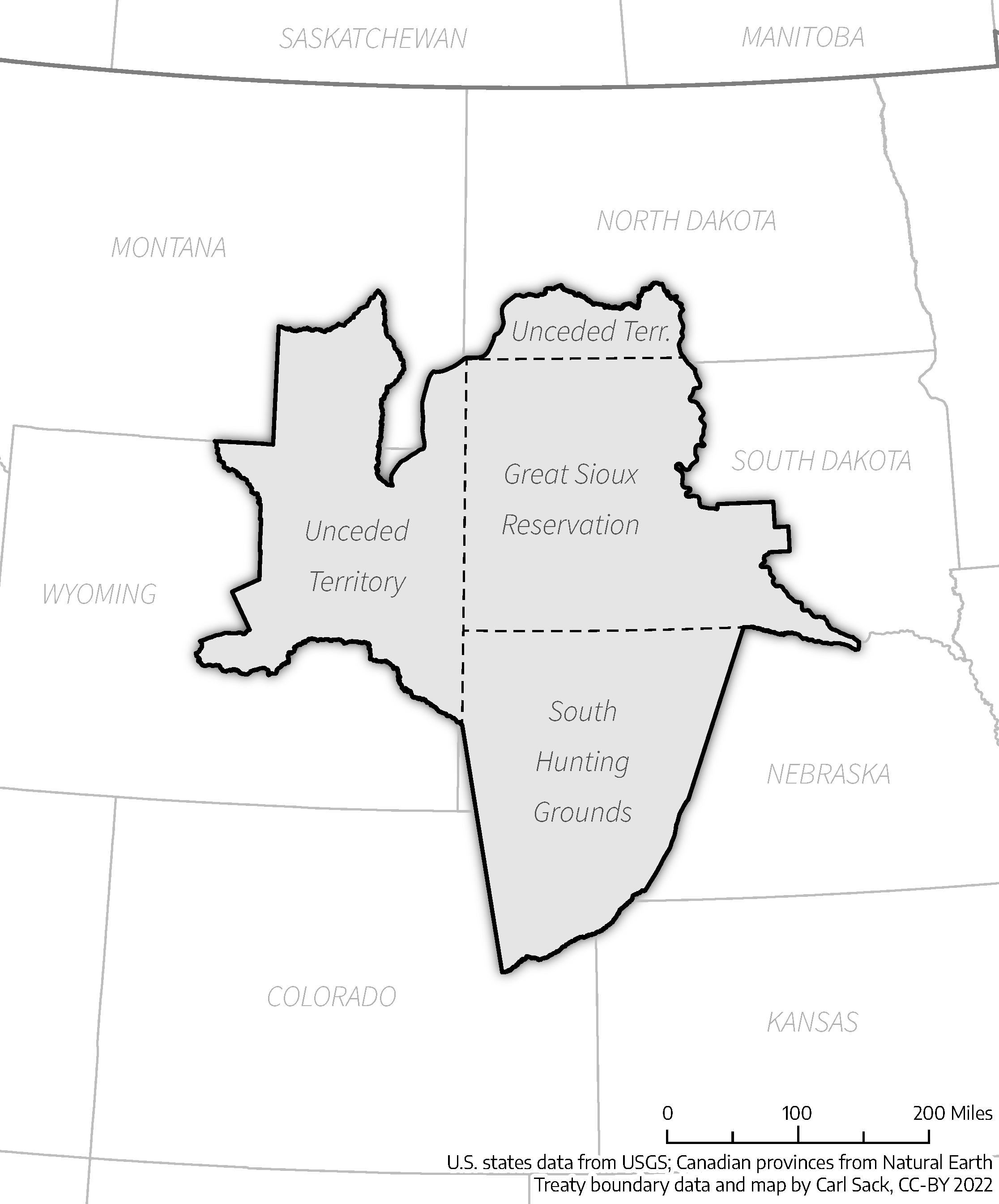
- Great Sioux Reservation (1868) and other Sioux lands as interpreted by 1978 Indian Claims Commission.
- Coordinates: 42.98°N 102.62°W

The Great Sioux Reservation was an Indian reservation created by the United States through treaty with the Sioux, principally the Lakota, who dominated the territory before its establishment. In the Fort Laramie Treaty of 1868, the reservation included lands west of the Missouri River in South Dakota and Nebraska, including all of present-day western South Dakota. The treaty also provided rights to roam and hunt in contiguous areas of North Dakota, Montana, Wyoming, and northeast Colorado.

Later acts of the U.S. Congress in 1877 and 1889 reduced Lakota territory to five reservations in western South Dakota, all remnants of the 1868 reservation. The Sioux nation successfully sued the United States for these encroachments, but the tribes have refused monetary compensation for illegally taken reservation lands.

== Original reservation ==
The United States used the Missouri River to form the eastern boundary of the Reservation, but some of the land within this area had already assigned to other tribes, such as the Ponca. The Lakota Nation considered the West River area central to their territory, as it had been since their discovery of the Paha Sapa (Black Hills) in 1765, and their domination of the area after they conquered and pushed out the Cheyenne in 1776. Paha Sapa was sacred to the Lakota, and they considered it their place of origin, thousands of years earlier.

In addition to the reservation dedicated to the Lakota, the treaty gave the Sioux the right to hunt and travel in "unceded" territory in much of Wyoming and in the Sandhills and Panhandle of modern Nebraska. Because each band had its own territory, the United States established several agencies through the Bureau of Indian Affairs to regulate the Lakota in this vast area.

Custer's 1874 Black Hills Expedition from Fort Abraham Lincoln (near Bismarck, Dakota Territory) to the Black Hills or Paha Sapa discovered gold. The public announcement attracted numerous miners to the region, resulting in open conflict with the Lakota. The US Army defeated the Lakota in the Black Hills War.

Most of the Sioux reservation remained intact for another 13 years.

== Later encroachments ==
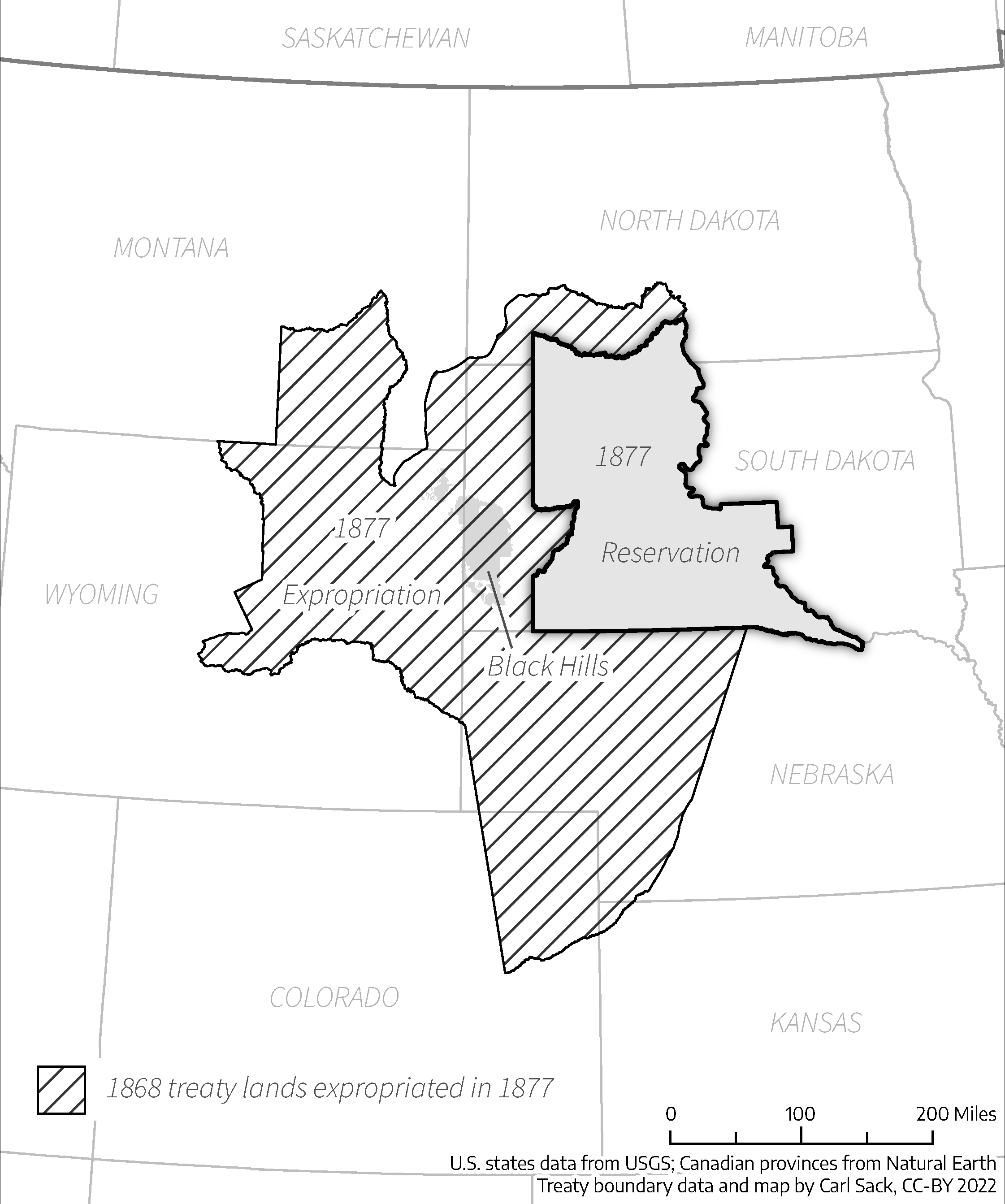
1877 cessions of Sioux land

Under a new treaty of 1877, the United States Congress forced the Sioux to cede a strip of land along the western border of Dakota Territory 50 miles (80 km) wide, plus all land west of the Cheyenne and Belle Fourche rivers, including all of the Black Hills in modern South Dakota.

=== General Allotment Act ===
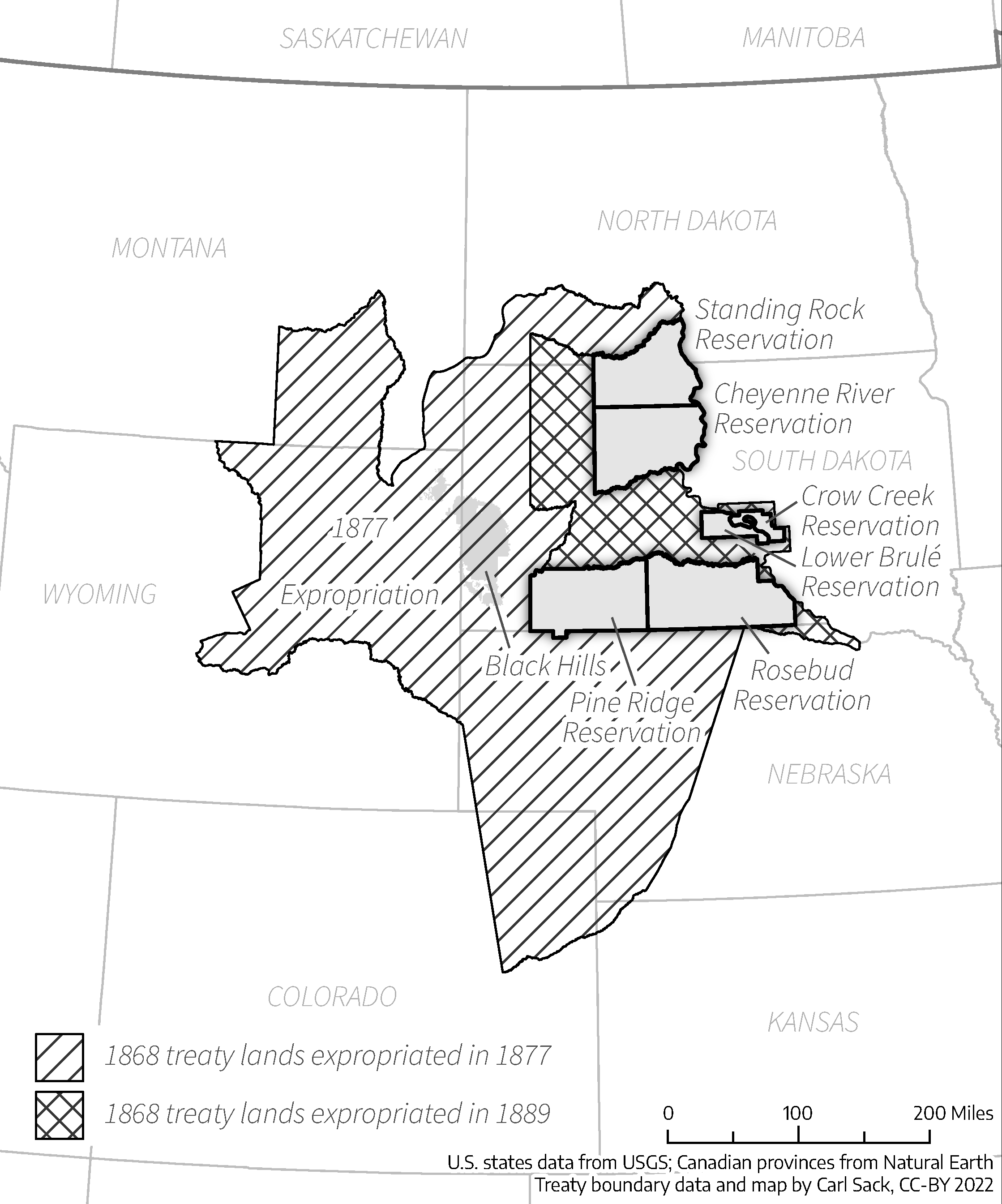
Congress' 1889 expropriation and partition of Sioux lands

In 1887, the United States Congress passed the General Allotment Act, also called the Dawes Act, to break up communal tribal lands on reservations and assign 160-acre (65 ha) plots in individual family households, in order to encourage subsistence farming. Among other problems, this plan did not take into account conditions on the Great Plains, and the allotments were generally too small to be successfully farmed in the arid conditions.

On 2 March 1889, Congress passed another act (just months before North Dakota and South Dakota were admitted to the Union on 2 November 1889), which partitioned the Great Sioux Reservation, creating five smaller reservations:

- Standing Rock Sioux Reservation (which included land in modern North Dakota that had not been part of the Great Sioux Reservation), with its agency at Fort Yates;
- Cheyenne River Reservation, with its agency west of the Missouri River near the Cheyenne River confluence; it was later moved to Eagle Butte, South Dakota, following the construction of Oahe Reservoir;
- Lower Brule Indian Reservation, with its agency near Fort Thompson;
- Upper Brule or Rosebud Indian Reservation, with its agency near Mission, South Dakota; and
- Pine Ridge Reservation (Oglala Sioux), with its agency at Pine Ridge, South Dakota, near the Nebraska border.

Neither the Crow Creek Reservation, east of the Missouri River in central South Dakota, nor the Fort Berthold Reservation, which straddles the Missouri River in western North Dakota, were part of the original Great Sioux Reservation.

After the boundaries of these five reservations were established, the government opened up approximately 9 million acres (36,000 km^{2}), one-half of the former Great Sioux Reservation, for public purchase for ranching and homesteading. Much of the area was not homesteaded until the 1910s, after the Enlarged Homestead Act increased allocations to 320 acres (1.3 km^{2}) for what was recognized as "semi-arid land".

Settlement was encouraged by the railroads. In addition, the US government issued publications of scientific instruction (since found to be incorrect) on how to farm the arid land. New United States immigrants came to the area. The Lakota tribes received $1.25 per acre, usually used to offset agency expenses in meeting federal treaty obligations to the tribes.

=== Dawes Allotment Act ===
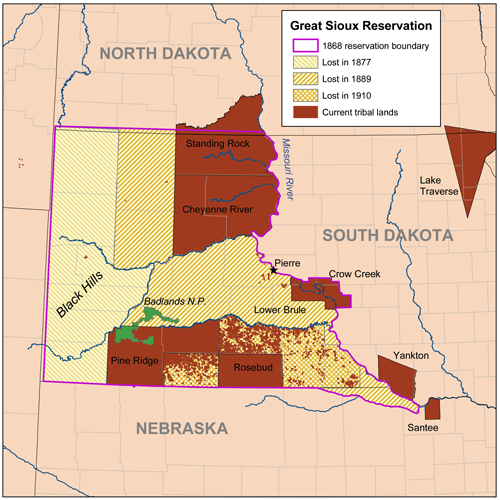
Territorial cessions, seizures, and sales, 1868 to 2008

By the Dawes Allotment Act, the federal government intended to break up the communal tribal lands in Indian Territory and other reservations and allocate portions to individual households to encourage subsistence farming on the European-American model. Federal registrars recorded tribal members in each tribe, as land was allotted to heads of households. (The Dawes Rolls have been used by some tribes as the basis of historic documentation of membership.) Congress allocated 160-acre (65 ha) parcels to heads of families, and declared any remaining land to be "surplus" and available for sale to non-natives. This caused major losses in communal lands. After a period of time, Native Americans could sell their land individually, and did.

The allotment of individual parcels and other measures reduced the total land in Indian ownership, while the government tried to force the people to convert to the lifestyles of subsistence farmers and craftsmen. The allocations were not based on accurate knowledge of whether the arid lands could support the small family farms envisioned by the government. This was largely an unsuccessful experiment for the Lakota and most homesteaders alike. Numerous European immigrants homesteaded the newly available lands on the Plains. Self-styled experts recommended regular tilling the soil to "attract" moisture from the sky.

The Plains were settled during what historians now know was a wetter than normal period, and farmers had some early success. But, as more normal drought conditions returned, many farms folded. The farmers did not know how to best preserve the limited moisture in the soil, and their practices resulted in the Dust Bowl conditions of the 1930s. Huge dust clouds reached as far as eastern cities; much of the fertile topsoil was lost, and many farmers abandoned their land. Today most farming is done by large-scale industrial farms which use different techniques, such as winter planting, to raise wheat.

By the 1960s, the five reservations had lost much of their territories, some through sales after the allotment process. In addition, the United States seized land as part of federal water-control projects, such as construction of Lake Oahe and other mainstream reservoirs on the Missouri River as part of the Pick-Sloan Missouri Basin Program. For instance, the Rosebud Reservation, which once included all of four counties and part of another, has been reduced to a single county: Todd County in south-central South Dakota. Much Indian-owned land remains in isolated sections of the other counties. Similar reductions occurred in the other reservations.

Both inside and outside the reservation boundaries in West River, the Lakota are an integral part of the region and its history: many towns have Lakota names, such as Owanka, Wasta, and Oacoma. Towns such as Hot Springs, Timber Lake, and Spearfish have English names translated from the original Lakota names. Some rivers and mountains retain Lakota names. The buffalo and antelope, indigenous game that were the basis of Lakota diet, now graze together with cattle and sheep. Bison ranching has been increasing on the Great Plains, in efforts to revive this important species. Numerous monuments honor Lakota and European-American heroes and events.

== Land claims ==
Although many non-Native homesteads were abandoned during the Dust Bowl era of the 1930s, rather than re-assigning the land to the Sioux, the federal government transferred much of the abandoned land to federal agencies. For instance, the National Park Service took over part of the modern National grasslands and the Bureau of Land Management was assigned other land for management.

In some cases, the United States appropriated more land from the reduced reservations, as in the case of the WW2-era Badlands Bombing Range, taken from the Oglala Sioux of Pine Ridge. Although the range was declared surplus to USAF needs in the 1960s, it was transferred to the National Park Service rather than returned to the tribe's communal ownership.

Considering the Black Hills sacred and illegally taken, in the 20th century, the Lakota pursued a suit against the US government for the return of the land. In the 1980 United States v. Sioux Nation of Indians, the Supreme Court of the United States ruled that the land had been taken illegally. The US government offered financial compensation in settlement. The Oglala Lakota are persisting in their demand to have the land returned to their nation; the account with their settlement compensation is earning interest.

== See also ==
- Great Sioux Nation
- Republic of Lakotah proposal
- Seizure of the Black Hills
- Siouxland
