= Ed McGaa =

Ed McGaa (April 16, 1936 – August 25, 2017) was an American new age author, workshop leader, and military veteran.

== Life ==
McGaa was born on the Pine Ridge Indian Reservation in South Dakota as a member of the Oglala Lakota. He served in the Marines in Korea, and as a fighter pilot in the Vietnam War, flying 110 combat missions, receiving 8 Air Medals and 2 Crosses of Gallantry. He was recommended for a Distinguished Flying Cross.

He received his bachelor's degree from Saint John's University and a law degree from the University of South Dakota. He participated in the Sun Dance ceremony with Frank Fools Crow. Later in life he wrote books and led workshops on spirituality.

== Works ==
- Reminiscences of Lorraine Three Legs, Standing Rock Sioux Tribe of South Dakota, 1969. Oral History
- Red Cloud, Minneapolis: Dillon Press, 1971. ISBN 0-87518-041-8
- Mother Earth Spirituality : native American paths to healing ourselves and our world, San Francisco : Harper & Row, 1990. ISBN 0-06-250596-3
- Rainbow Tribe: ordinary people journeying on the red road, San Francisco: Harper, 1992. ISBN 0-06-250611-0
- Native Wisdom: Perceptions of the Natural Way. Minneapolis, MN: Four Directions Publishing. 1995. ISBN 0-9645173-1-0.
- Eagle Vision: Return of the Hoop, Minneapolis, MN : Four Directions Publishing, 1998. ISBN 0-9645173-6-1
- Crazy Horse and Chief Red Cloud, Rapid City, South Dakota: Four Directions Publishing, 2004. ISBN 978-0-9645173-3-2
- Nature's Way: Native Wisdom for Living in Balance with the Earth. HarperCollins. 2005. ISBN 978-0-06-075048-0.
