= Interior Radar Bomb Scoring Site =

The Interior Radar Bomb Scoring Site (callsign Badlands Bomb Plot) opened in August 1960 on Hurley Butte (43.719846°N 102.14294°W), adjacent to the Pine Ridge Indian Reservation and a few miles from Interior, South Dakota. The Interior RBSS is a Formerly Used Defense Site, that closed in 1968.

== History ==
It replaced the Los Angeles Bomb Plot at Cheli AFS. Operated and maintained by Detachment 2 of the 11th Radar Bomb Scoring Squadron, Radar Bomb Scoring Division, 1st Combat Evaluation Group (initially by temporary duty personnel), the RBS site was 1 of ~14 that remained after the 1965-6 deployment of RBS site personnel for Vietnam Combat Skyspot.

Family housing for the detachment was on the western edge of Wall, South Dakota, and barracks initially used for the station were shared by Boeing facility contractors for the Ellsworth Air Force Base 850th Strategic Missile Squadron's HGM-25A Titan I ICBMs.

At the end of the Cold War, numerous nearby radar sites for RBS and electronic warfare simulation included those at the Alzada (2 sites), Ekalaka, & Hulett Mini-Mutes Radar Sites, the Clark & Colony Radar Bomb Scoring Sites, and the "Ellsworth Air Force Base" sites (Belle Fourche, Colmer, & Horman Radar Bomb Scoring Sites and the Antelope Butte Mini Mute Radar Bomb Scoring Site).

The Interior Family Housing Site, a "detached installation" of Barksdale Air Force Base provided homes from 26 June 1968 to 30 April 1969. Det 2 moved to the Holbrook Bomb Plot in Arizona in 1968. Concrete pads at Hurley Butte remain from when the RBS equipment and personnel transferred to Holbrook, Arizona (1968-1993) merged w/ Det 19 Poplar MT to move to Det 4 Harrison AR).
