= Badlands Bombing Range =

- Near Pine Ridge Indian Reservation in United States
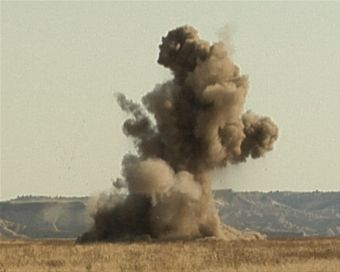
- Controlled explosion of unexploded ordnance at the Air Force Retained Area (October 3, 2011)

Site information
- Type: Bombing range
- Operator: 1942–1945: United States Army c. 1946-59: North Dakota National Guard; 1960–1968: Strategic Air Command; 1968–present: United States Air Force
- Status: Closed

Location
- Coordinates: 43°40′55″N 102°17′55″W

Site history
- In use: 1942–1968

Test information
- Other tests: Bombing range Gunnery range Bomb Plot; Retained Area

The Badlands Bombing Range (BBR) refers to Rapid City Army Air Base target ranges for World War II which included the current Air Force Retained Area, an inactive 2,486-acre (10.06 km^{2}) United States Air Force site "20 miles southeast" of Scenic, South Dakota. The retained area is the remainder of 341,726 acres (1,382.92 km^{2}) federally acquired in 1942 under eminent domain at the Pine Ridge Indian Reservation (Oglala Sioux). In addition to use by World War II aircraft, BBR was used for a post-war Army National Guard gunnery range and a Cold War Radar Bomb Scoring site.

== Rapid City AAB ranges ==
Rapid City AAB aircraft (e.g., for Bombardier training used the Butte County #1 Precision Bombing Range (Newell Bombing Range) 37 mi (60 km) North of the base, Rapid City #2 Precision Bombing Range (Pierre Bombing Range) 129 mi (208 km) East, the Air to Ground Range of 11,532 acres (46.67 km^{2}) & 33 mi (53 km) East-Northeast, and the Air to Air Range 33 mi (53 km) Southeast. The "air-to-air and air-to-ground gunnery ranges" were on 337 acres (1.36 km^{2}) of the Badlands National Monument.

== Badlands gunnery range ==
Post-war the South Dakota National Guard "used portions of the bombing range as an artillery range". Firing took place within most of the present day Badlands National Park with old car bodies and 55 gallon drums painted bright yellow for targets. By 2008 the National Park Service had placed an interpretive sign for "The Badlands Gunnery Range".

== Badlands Bomb Plot ==
The Interior Radar Bomb Scoring Site (callsign Badlands Bomb Plot) opened in August 1960 on Hurley Butte (43.719846°N 102.14294°W) adjacent to the Pine Ridge Reservation and a few miles from Interior, South Dakota to replace the Los Angeles Bomb Plot at Cheli AFS. Operated and maintained by Detachment 2 of the 11th Radar Bomb Scoring Squadron (initially by temporary duty personnel), the RBS site was 1 of ~14 that remained after the 1965-6 deployment of RBS site personnel for Vietnam Combat Skyspot. Family housing for the detachment "was on the western edge of Wall", a nearby town, and barracks initially used for the station were shared by Boeing facility contractors for the Ellsworth Air Force Base 850th SMS's HGM-25A Titan I ICBMs. Concrete pads at Hurley Butte remain from when the RBS equipment and personnel transferred to Holbrook, Arizona (1968–1993, merged w/ Det 19 Poplar MT to move to Det 4 Harrison AR). At the end of the Cold War, numerous nearby radar sites for RBS and electronic warfare simulation included those at the Alzada (2 sites), Ekalaka, & Hulett Mini-Mutes Radar Sites, the Clark & Colony Radar Bomb Scoring Sites, and the "Ellsworth Air Force Base" sites (Belle Fourche, Colmer, & Horman Radar Bomb Scoring Sites and the Antelope Butte Mini Mute Radar Bomb Scoring Site).

== Decommissioning and environmental mitigation ==
External images
- remains of RBS site
- Gunnery Range interpretive sign

After the Badlands Bomb Plot closed, "the USAF declared most of the range excess property" in 1968, and Public Law 90-468 restored control of 202,357 acres (818.91 km^{2}) to the Oglala Sioux Tribe. The Oglala Sioux protested the designation of 136,882 acres (553.94 km^{2}) "of formerly held Tribal lands" as the Badlands National Monument In 1999 at the "BBR 1" target, "40 M 38 practice bombs, 4 rocket bodies (2.25-inch SCAR) or rocket warheads (2.75-inch), [and] 33 pieces of ordnance scrap (mostly tail fins)" were recovered. At the BBR 2 site used as an aerial gunnery target, 2.25-inch SCAR and 2.75-inch rockets were used and 28 "SCAR rocket bodies were recovered" along with 17 M38 bombs and 11 intact warheads from 2.75-inch rockets.

A 2008 USAF & Oglala Sioux agreement initiated "a three-month $1.6 million project to remove unexploded ordnance" on the Air Force Retained Area. "The last four known munitions" were exploded on October 3, 2011.
