= Hurley Butte =

Hurley Butte is an elevated landform in the South Dakota Badlands that is the location of a Formerly Used Defense Site adjacent to the Pine Ridge Reservation and a few miles from Interior, South Dakota. The Strategic Air Command used Hurley Butte for the Interior Radar Bomb Scoring Site prior to establishing the Belle Fourche Strategic Training Range in the Devil's Tower/Black Hills area of Ellsworth Air Force Base. The base of the site remains visible at 43.719846°N 102.14294°W.
