= Regina Brave =

Oglala Lakota activist

Regina Brave is an Oglala Lakota activist who lives at the Pine Ridge Indian Reservation in South Dakota. She was at the Dakota Access Pipeline Protests in 2016 and 2017 and Wounded Knee incident in 1973. She's the mother of Walter Brave who fathers his 5 children. (Tiffany Brave, Lyle Sutton Jr., Winona Abilene Brave, Brittany Brave, and Logan “Lola” Blackhorse.) She has another son, Charles Whalen/Wiyáka Zi. She has two daughters, Ann Dixon (1971-1996) who died in a car accident in 1996. She left behind a son, Tȟa Húnku Čaŋté Wiča Dixon. They both carry the last name of their stepfather/Stepgrandfather. Another daughter, Ohítika Brave and her children, X’Andra, Kaŋǧi Lúta Wiyaŋ, Jackie and Jason. Regina is a great grandma to Diondre (X’Andra), Aŋpo Wičaȟpi (Tȟa Húnku Čaŋte Wiča), and Naleia (Kaŋǧi Lúta Wiyaŋ).
