= Pine Ridge Indian Reservation =

Oglala Lakota area in South Dakota, US

Coordinates: 43°21′12″N 102°05′21″W

Pine Ridge Indian Reservation Wazí Aháŋhaŋ Oyáŋke (Lakota) Oglala Lakota Reservation
- Indian reservation
- Flag
- Anthem: ("Wapaha kiŋ kekah'boyaŋhan" and "Lakota Flag Song" used for some occasions)
- Location of the reservation in South Dakota
- Tribe: Oglala Sioux
- Country: United States
- States: South Dakota (99%); Nebraska (1%)
- Counties: Bennett (Part); Jackson (half); Oglala Lakota (all); Sheridan (part)
- Established: 1889
- Headquarters: Pine Ridge

Government
  - Governing Body: Tribal Council
  - President: Frank Star Comes Out (D)
  - Vice-President: Alicia Mousseau (D)

Area
  - Total: 8,984.3 km^{2} (3,468.86 sq mi)

Population (2020)
  - Total: 32,000
  - Density: 3.6/km^{2} (9.2/sq mi)
- Time zone: UTC-7 (MST)
  - Summer (DST): UTC-6 (MDT)
- GDP: $330.8 million (2018)
- Website: www.oglala.gov

The Pine Ridge Indian Reservation (Lakota: Wazí Aháŋhaŋ Oyáŋke), also called Pine Ridge Agency, is an Oglala Lakota Indian reservation located in the U.S. state of South Dakota, with a small portion extending into Nebraska. Originally included within the territory of the Great Sioux Reservation, Pine Ridge was created by the Act of March 2, 1889, 25 Stat. 888. in the southwest corner of South Dakota on the Nebraska border. It consists of 4,353 mi^{2} (11,274 km^{2}) of area and is one of the largest reservations in the United States.

The reservation encompasses the entirety of Oglala Lakota County and Bennett County, the southern half of Jackson County, and a small section of Sheridan County added by Executive Order No. 2980 of February 20, 1904. Of the 3,142 counties in the United States, these are among the poorest. Only 84,000 acres (340 km^{2}) of land are suitable for agriculture. The 2000 census population of the reservation was 15,521. A 2009 study by Colorado State University and accepted by the United States Department of Housing and Urban Development has estimated the resident population to reach 28,787.

Pine Ridge is the site of several events that mark milestones in the history between the Sioux of the area and the U.S. government. Stronghold Table, a mesa in what is today the Oglala-administered portion of Badlands National Park, was the location of the last of the Ghost Dances. U.S. authorities repressed this movement, eventually leading to the Wounded Knee Massacre on December 29, 1890. A mixed band of Miniconjou Lakota and Hunkpapa Sioux, led by Chief Spotted Elk, sought sanctuary at Pine Ridge after fleeing the Standing Rock Agency, where Sitting Bull had been killed during efforts to arrest him. The families were intercepted and attacked by a heavily armed detachment of the Seventh Cavalry, which killed many women and children as well as warriors. This was the last large engagement between U.S. forces and Native Americans and marked the end of the western frontier.

Changes accumulated in the last quarter of the 20th century: in 1971 the Oglala Sioux Tribe (OST) started Oglala Lakota College, a tribal college, which offers 4-year degrees. In 1973 decades of discontent at the Pine Ridge Reservation resulted in a grassroots protest that escalated into the Wounded Knee Incident, gaining national attention. Members of the Oglala Lakota, the American Indian Movement and supporters occupied the town in defiance of federal and state law enforcement in a protest that turned into an armed standoff lasting 71 days. This event inspired American Indians across the country and gradually led to changes at the reservation. It has revived some cultural traditions and encouraged language training. In 1981 Tim Giago (Lakota) started the Lakota Times at Pine Ridge.

Located at the southern end of the Badlands, the reservation is part of the mixed grass prairie, an ecological transition zone between the short-grass and tall-grass prairies; all are part of the Great Plains. A great variety of plant and animal life flourishes on and adjacent to the reservation, including the endangered black-footed ferret. The area is also important in the field of paleontology; it contains deposits of Pierre Shale formed on the seafloor of the Western Interior Seaway, evidence of the marine Cretaceous–Paleogene boundary, and one of the largest deposits of fossils of extinct mammals from the Oligocene epoch.

== History ==
=== 19th century ===
==== Great Sioux Reservation ====
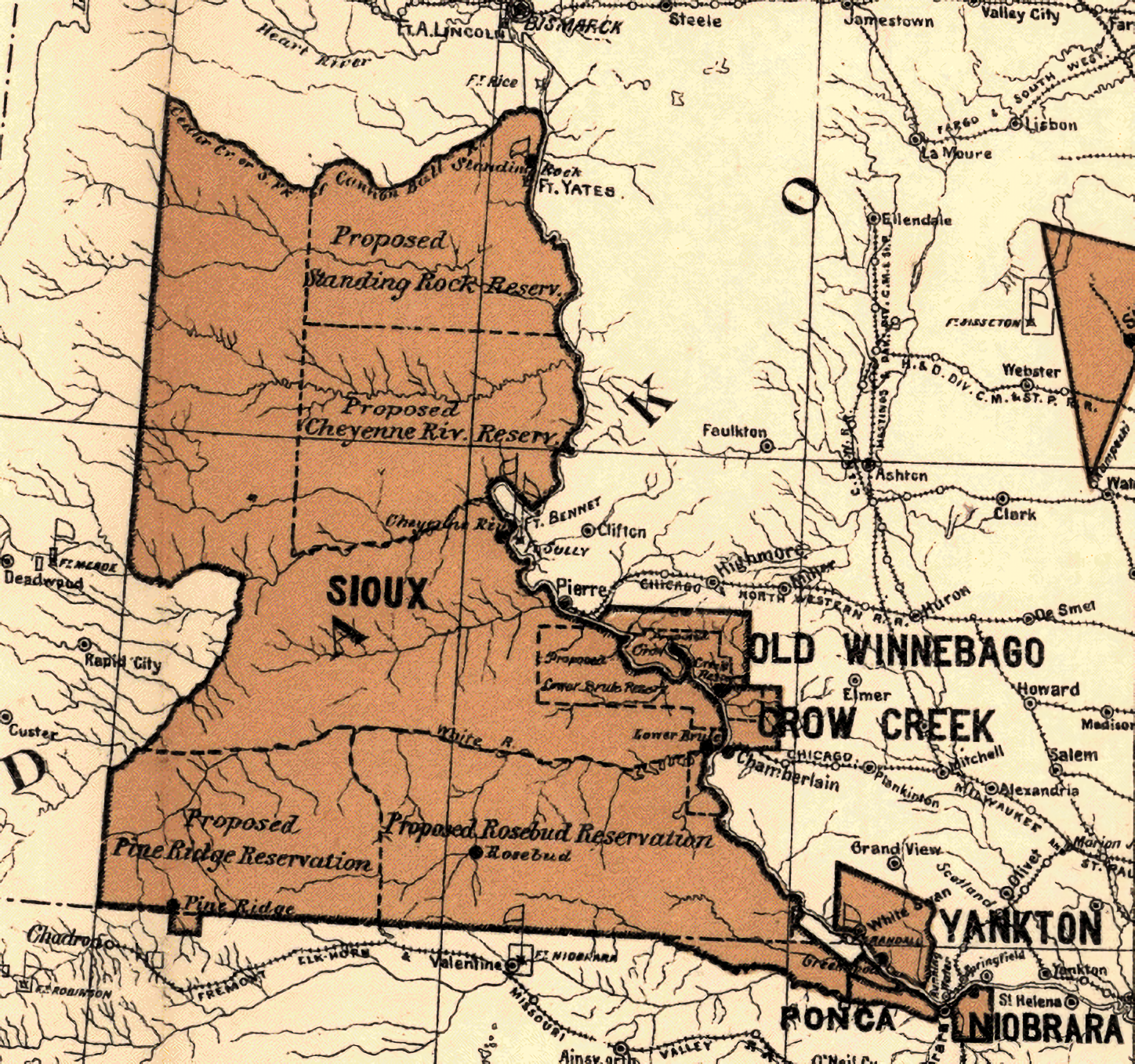
Great Sioux Reservation, 1888, established by Treaty of Fort Laramie (1868)

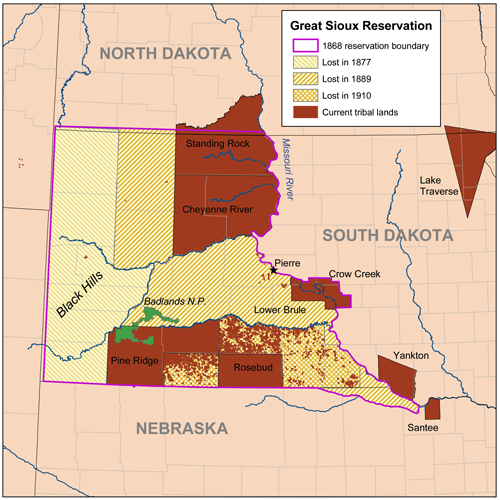
A map showing the Great Sioux Reservation, subsequent loss of land to the federal government, and current holdings of the various Sioux reservations

As stipulated in the Treaty of Fort Laramie (1868), the U.S. government built Native American agencies for the various Lakota and other Plains tribes. These were forerunners to the modern Indian reservations. The Red Cloud Agency was established for the Oglala Lakota in 1871 on the North Platte River in Wyoming Territory. The location was one mile (1.6 km) west of the present town of Henry, Nebraska. The location of the Red Cloud Agency was moved to two other locations before being settled at the present Pine Ridge location. Pine Ridge Reservation was originally part of the Great Sioux Reservation established by the 1868 Treaty of Fort Laramie. It encompassed approximately 60 million contiguous acres (240,000 km^{2}) of western South Dakota (all of what is now called West River), northern Nebraska and eastern Wyoming.

==== Exclusion of the Black Hills ====
In 1874, George Armstrong Custer led the U.S. Army Black Hills Expedition, which set out on July 2 from Fort Abraham Lincoln in the Dakota Territory, with orders to travel to the previously uncharted Black Hills of South Dakota. Its mission was to look for suitable locations for a fort, find a route to the southwest, and to investigate the potential for gold mining. After the discovery of gold was made public, miners began invading Sioux Territory.

"Custer's florid descriptions of the mineral and timber resources of the Black Hills, and the land's suitability for grazing and cultivation ... received wide circulation, and had the effect of creating an intense popular demand for more settlers to invade the Black Hills." Initially the U.S. military tried to turn away trespassing miners and settlers. Eventually President Grant, the Secretary of the Interior, and the Secretary of War, "decided that the military should make no further resistance to the occupation of the Black Hills by miners." These orders were to be enforced "quietly", and the President's decision was to remain "confidential".

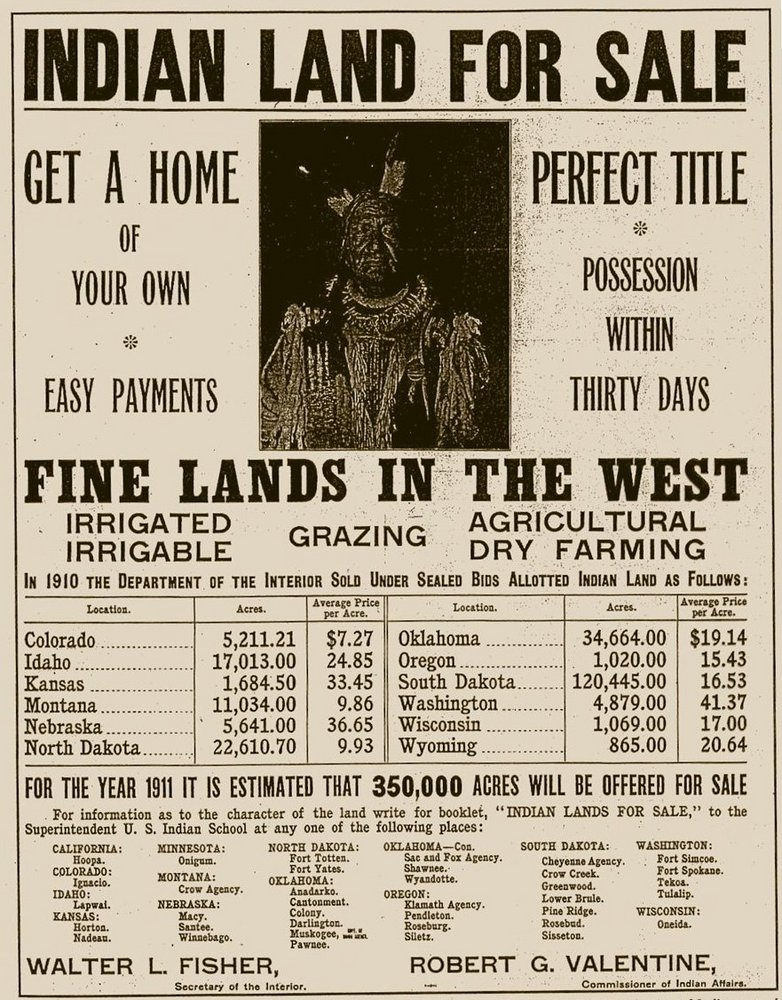
A 1911 ad offering former reservation land for sale. Most of the "allotted Indian land" sold the previous year (1910) was Sioux land.

As more settlers and gold miners encroached upon the Black Hills, the Government determined it had to acquire the land from the Sioux, and appointed a commission to negotiate the purchase. The negotiations failed, as the Sioux resisted giving up what they considered sacred land. The U.S. resorted to military force. They declared the Sioux Indians "hostile" for failing to obey an order to return from an off-reservation hunting expedition by a specific date. In the dead of winter, the Sioux found the overland travel was impossible.

The consequent military expedition to remove the Sioux from the Black Hills included an attack on a major encampment of several bands on the Little Bighorn River. Led by General Custer, the attack ended in his defeat. It was an overwhelming victory of chiefs Sitting Bull and Crazy Horse over the 7th Cavalry Regiment, a conflict often called Custer's Last Stand. US forces were vastly outnumbered.

In 1876 the U.S. Congress decided to open up the Black Hills to development and break up the Great Sioux Reservation. In 1877, it passed an act to make 7.7 million acres (31,000 km^{2}) of the Black Hills available for sale to homesteaders and private interests. In 1889 Congress divided the remaining area of Great Sioux Reservation into five separate reservations, defining the boundaries of each in its Act of March 2, 1889, 25 Stat. 888. Pine Ridge was established at that time.

==== Wounded Knee Massacre ====
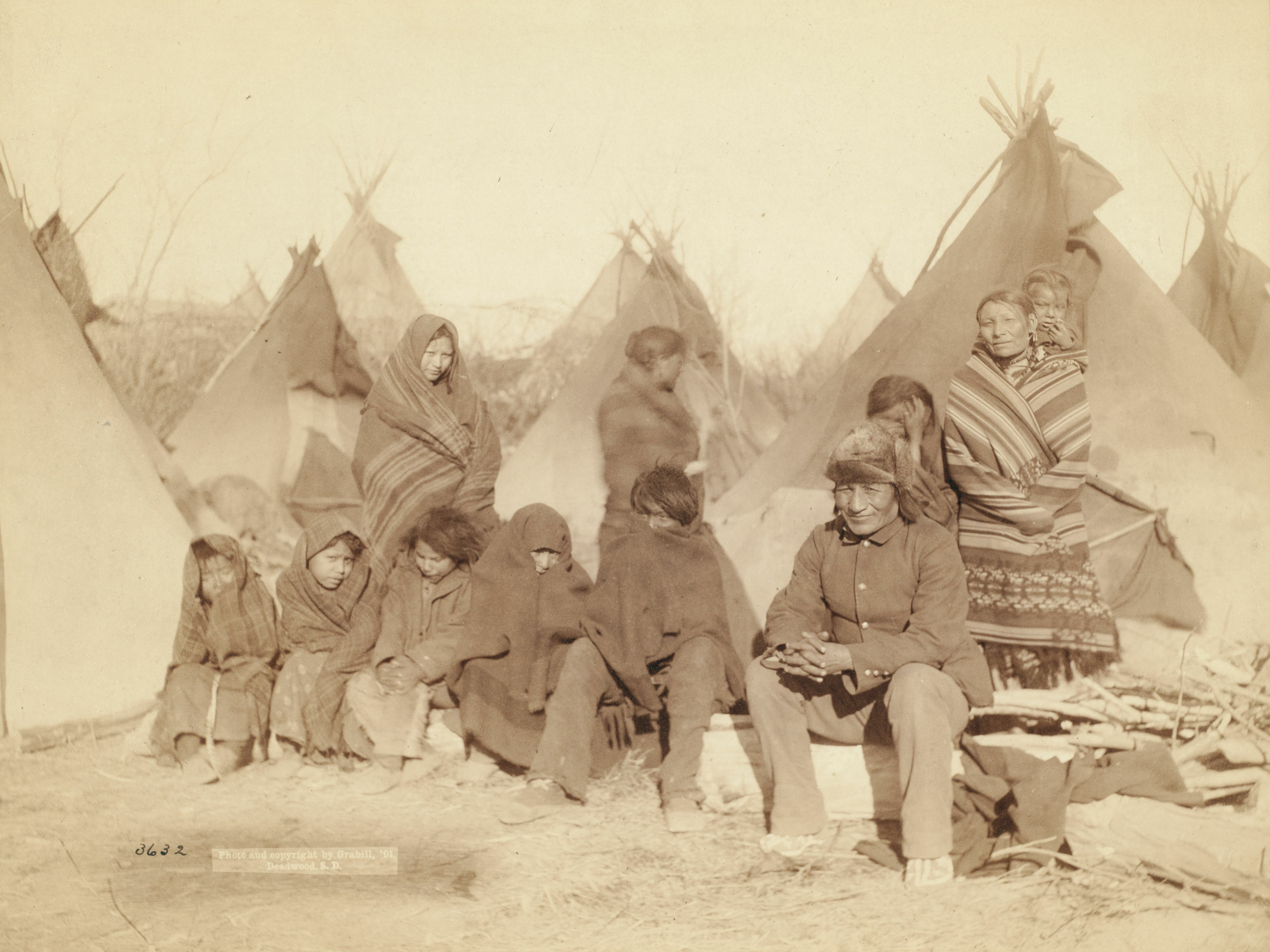
Survivors of Wounded Knee Massacre, 1891 (Title: What's left of Big Foot's band). John C. Grabill.

The Wounded Knee Massacre occurred on December 29, 1890, near Wounded Knee Creek (Lakota: Cankpe Opi Wakpala). On the day before, a detachment of the U.S. 7th Cavalry Regiment commanded by Major Samuel M. Whitside intercepted Spotted Elk's (Big Foot) band of Miniconjou Lakota and 38 Hunkpapa Lakota near Porcupine Butte and escorted them 5 miles (8.0 km) westward to Wounded Knee Creek where they made camp. The rest of the 7th Cavalry Regiment, led by Colonel James Forsyth, surrounded the encampment, supported by four Hotchkiss guns.

On the morning of December 29, 1890, the troops went into the camp to disarm the Lakota. One version of events claims that during the process, a deaf tribesman named Black Coyote was reluctant to give up his rifle, saying he had paid a lot for it. A scuffle over Black Coyote's rifle escalated and a shot was fired, which resulted in the 7th Cavalry opening firing indiscriminately from all sides, killing men, women, and children, as well as some of their fellow troopers. Those few Lakota warriors who still had weapons began shooting back at the troopers, who quickly suppressed the Lakota fire. The surviving Lakota fled, but U.S. cavalrymen pursued and killed many who were unarmed.

In the end, U.S. forces killed at least 150 men, women, and children of the Lakota Sioux and wounded 51 (four men, and 47 women and children, some of whom died later); some estimates placed the number of dead at 300. Twenty-five troopers also died, and thirty-nine were wounded (six of the wounded would also die). Many Army deaths were believed to have been caused by friendly fire, as the shooting took place at close range in chaotic conditions.

The site has been designated a National Historic Landmark and is administered by the National Park Service.

=== 20th century ===
==== White Clay Extension ====
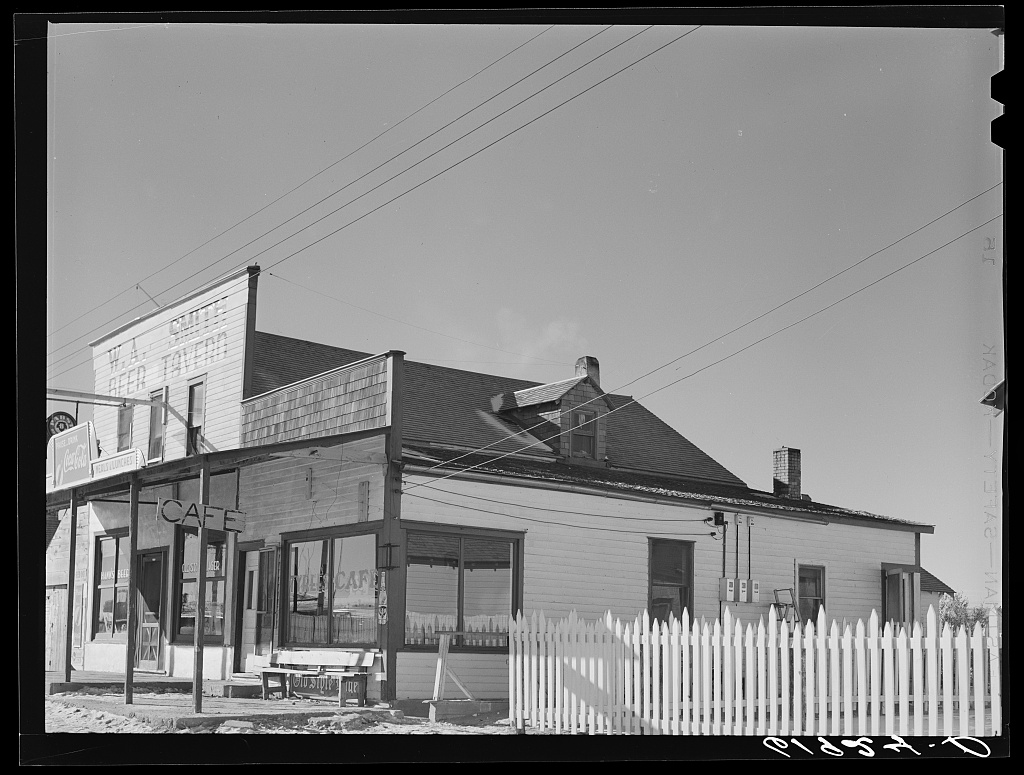
A tavern in Whiteclay, Nebraska, 1940

In 1882, at the urging of Valentine McGillycuddy—the US Indian Agent at the Pine President Agency—President Chester A. Arthur issued an executive order establishing the White Clay Extension, an area of land in Nebraska extending 5 miles (8.0 km) south of the reservation's border and 10 miles (16 km) wide approximately perpendicular to the road leading north into the town of Pine Ridge on the reservation. This road is today's Nebraska Highway 87. McGillycuddy lobbied for the buffer zone to prevent white peddlers from engaging in the illegal sale of "knives, guns, and alcohol" to the Oglala Lakota residents of Pine Ridge.

A law passed in Congress in 1832 banned the sale of alcohol to Native Americans. The ban was ended in 1953 by Public Law 277, signed by President Dwight D. Eisenhower. The amended law gave Native American tribes the option of permitting or banning alcohol sales and consumption on their lands. The OST and many other tribes chose to exclude alcohol from their reservations because of the problems for their people.

In 1887, when Congress enacted the Dawes Severalty Act of 1887—breaking up the reservations and allotting a 160 acres (65 ha) plot to the registered head of each family—the Whiteclay Extension was specifically exempted. On March 2, 1889, the U.S. Congress enacted the Great Sioux Agreement of March 2, 1889, 25 Stat. 888, breaking up the Great Sioux Reservation and setting boundaries for the six reduced reservations. In this act, the White Clay Extension was incorporated again within the boundaries of the Pine Ridge Agency. "Provided, That the said tract of land in the State of Nebraska shall be reserved, by Executive order, only so long as it may be needed for the use and protection of the Indians receiving rations and annuities at the Pine Ridge Agency."

On January 25, 1904, President Theodore Roosevelt signed an executive order returning the 50 square miles (130 km^{2}) of the White Clay Extension to the public domain. The town of Whiteclay in Sheridan County, Nebraska, just over the border from the reservation, was founded in the former "Extension" zone. Merchants quickly started selling alcohol to the Oglala Sioux.

It is hereby ordered that the tract of country in the State of Nebraska "withdrawn from sale and set aside as an addition to the present Sioux Indian Reservation in the Territory of Dakota" by Executive order dated January 24, 1882, be, and the same hereby is, restored to the public domain.

— President Theodore Roosevelt, January 25, 1904.

On February 20, 1904, Roosevelt amended the executive order to return 1 square mile (2.6 km^{2}) back to Pine Ridge: "the section of land embracing the Pine Ridge Boarding School irrigation ditch and the school pasture".

==== Bennett County Land dispute ====
In 1975 in Cook v. Parkinson 525 F.2d 120 (8th Cir. 1975) ruled that Bennett County was not considered part of the Pine Ridge Reservation. However, "the United States participated only as amicus before the Eighth Circuit Court of Appeals in Cook v. Parkinson, 525 F.2d 120 (8th Cir. 1975) and is not bound by that decision because it did not participate in the litigation. The United States was a party in United States v. Bennett County, 394 F.2d 8 (8th Cir. 1968), in which the State of South Dakota had to obtain permission from the Department of Interior in order to fix roads or condemn property in Bennett County, consistent with the property's reservation status as well as Putnam v. United States 248 F.2d 292 (8th Cir. 1957) which ruled that "Bennett County is within the Pine Ridge Indian Reservation created by the Act of Congress of March 2, 1889, 25 Stat. 888."

The Federal Government recognizes Bennett County as being entirely within the Pine Ridge Indian Reservation. In 2004, in State of South Dakota v. Acting Great Plains Regional Director, Bureau of Indian Affairs Docket Number IBIA3-24-A the State of South Dakota argued against an Oglala Sioux Tribal member's application to the BIA to return a 10-acre tract of land in Bennett County into Federal Trust arguing it was outside of the Boundary of the Pine Ridge Reservation. The judge ruled in favor of the applicant and Bureau of Indian Affairs' affirmant that Bennett County is indeed within the boundaries of the Reservation.

==== Indian Reorganization Act ====
In the 1930s, President Franklin D. Roosevelt's administration made changes in federal policy to improve conditions for American Indians. In response to complaints about corruption and injustices in the BIA management of reservations, Congress passed the Indian Reorganization Act of 1934, permitting tribal nations to reorganize with self-government. It encouraged them to adopt a model of elected representative governments and elected tribal chairmen or presidents, with written constitutions. While tribes welcomed taking back more control of their government, this change eroded the power and structure of the traditional hereditary leaders of the clan system.

The Oglala Sioux Tribe developed a tribal government along democratic constitutional lines, with a chairman to be elected for a two-year term. This short term makes it difficult for leaders to accomplish longer-term projects, but the tribe has not changed its constitution. The BIA still has had the ability to oversee some tribal operations, including the police. Historically BIA tribal police were often assigned from other Indian tribes rather than representing local people and understanding their culture, which created tensions.

Many traditionalists among the Oglala Lakota never supported the new style of government. Tribal elders were still respected, and there were multiple lines of authority and influence among different groups on the reservation. Political factions also formed between those who were mixed-bloods or had urban experiences, and those who were full-bloods and tended to be more traditional in practices and culture.

The people continued to be under assimilation pressure: through the early part of the century, many children were sent away to Indian boarding schools where they were usually required to speak English and were prohibited from speaking Lakota. They were usually expected to practice Christianity rather than native religions. In the late 20th century, many of these institutions were found to have had staff who abused the children in their care.

==== Taking of Badlands Bombing Range ====
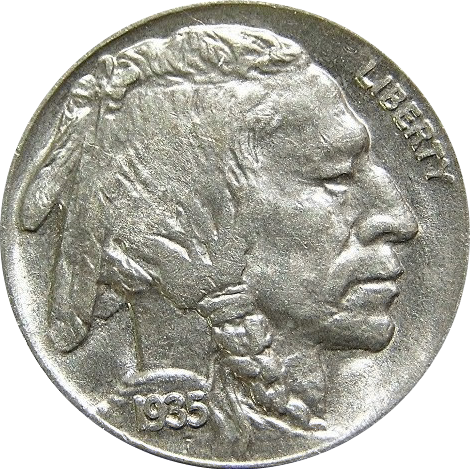
A model for the Indian Head Nickel, or Buffalo Nickel, had his home taken when the Badlands Bombing Range was seized.

In 1942 the federal government took privately held Pine Ridge Indian Reservation land owned by tribal members in order to establish the Badlands Bombing Range of 341,725 acres (1,382.91 km^{2}). The largest portion is located in Oglala Lakota County. It also leased communally held Oglala Sioux Tribe (OST) land for this defense installation.

Among the 125 families evicted was that of Pat Cuny, an Oglala Sioux. He fought in World War II in the Battle of the Bulge after surviving torpedoing of his transport in the English Channel. Dewey Beard, a Miniconjou Sioux survivor of the Wounded Knee Massacre, who supported himself by raising horses on his 908-acre (3.67 km^{2}) allotment received in 1907 was also evicted. The small federal payments were insufficient to enable such persons to buy new properties. In 1955, the 97-year-old Beard testified of earlier mistreatment at Congressional hearings about this project. He said, for "fifty years I have been kicked around. Today there is a hard winter coming. ... I might starve to death."

Since 1960, the U.S. has returned portions of the bombing range to the OST. The 1968 Public Law 90-468 returned 202,357 acres (818.91 km^{2}) to the OST and set aside former tribal lands as the Badlands National Monument. The smaller Air Force Retained Area is within the boundaries of the reservation.

Understandably, many people now believe that the disruption of the time period 1973 –76 was instigated by the Wilson administration —and U.S. agents using that administration— to distract the people from these and other agreements being made about their land.

— Peter Matthiessen In the Spirit of Crazy Horse, page 425

A 2008, the USAF & OST agreement initiated "a three-month $1.6 million project to remove unexploded ordnance" from the bombing range.

==== Wounded Knee Occupation ====
In the early 1970s, tribal tensions rose and some members turned to the American Indian Movement (AIM) for help. Longstanding divisions on the reservation resulted from deep-seated political, ethnic and cultural differences. Many residents did not support the elected tribal government. Many residents were upset about what they described as the autocratic and repressive actions by the tribal president Dick Wilson, elected in 1972.

On February 21, the tribal council was called into session to consider the removal of Wilson through impeachment. Five hundred Oglala members were in attendance. He was criticized for favoring family and friends with jobs and benefits, not consulting with the tribal council, and creating a private militia, known as the Guardians of the Oglala Nation (GOONs), to suppress political opponents. He used tribal funds to pay for this force. Wilson's response was to screen a right wing propaganda film.

After a series of meetings held in the Calico community near the Pine Ridge Agency, the old traditional chiefs and the Oglala Sioux Civil Rights Organization (OSCRO) called down to AIM in Rapid City and asked them to come to Pine Ridge. A meeting was arranged between Wilson and Russell Means. Five of Wilson's supporters cornered Means in the parking lot. Means escaped. Women elders such as Ellen Moves Camp, founder of the Oglala Sioux Civil Rights Organization (OSCRO), called for action. They organized a public protest for the next day.

About 200 AIM and Oglala Lakota activists occupied the hamlet of Wounded Knee on February 27, 1973. They demanded the removal of Wilson, restoration of treaty negotiations with the U.S. government, and correction of U.S. failures to enforce treaty rights. Visits by the U.S. senators from South Dakota, FBI agents and United States Department of Justice (DOJ) representatives, were attended by widespread media coverage, but the Richard Nixon administration was preoccupied internally with Watergate.

As the events evolved, the activists at Wounded Knee had a 71-day armed stand-off with U.S. law enforcement. AIM leaders at the site were Russell Means, Dennis Banks, Clyde Bellecourt, and Carter Camp. Traditional spiritual leaders of the Lakota, such as Frank Fools Crow, were also prominent. Fools Crow led Oglala Lakota spiritual ceremonies and practice in their ways for participants. Joseph H. Trimbach of the FBI and Steve Frizell of DOJ led the government.

Casualties of gunfire included a U.S. Marshal, who was seriously wounded and paralyzed; and the deaths of Frank Clearwater, a Cherokee from North Carolina, and Buddy Lamont, a local Oglala Lakota. After Lamont's death, the Oglala Lakota elders called an end to the occupation. Some Lakota have alleged that Ray Robinson, a civil rights activist, was killed during the Wounded Knee occupation, as he disappeared there.

The stand-off ended, but Wilson remained in office. The U.S. government said it could not remove an elected tribal official as the Oglala Sioux Tribe had sovereignty. Ensuing open conflict between factions caused numerous deaths. The murder rate between March 1, 1973, and March 1, 1976, was 170 per 100,000; it was the highest in the country. More than 60 opponents of the tribal government allegedly died violent deaths in the three years following the Wounded Knee Incident, a period called the "Reign of Terror" by many residents. Among those killed was Pedro Bissonette, executive director of the civil rights organization OSCRO.

Residents accused officials of failing to try to solve the deaths. In 2000, the FBI released a report regarding the 57 alleged unsolved violent deaths on Pine Ridge Reservation and accounted for most of the deaths, and disputed the claims of unsolved murders. The report stated that only 4 deaths were unsolved and that some deaths were not murders. AIM representatives criticized the FBI report.

==== Pine Ridge Shootout ====
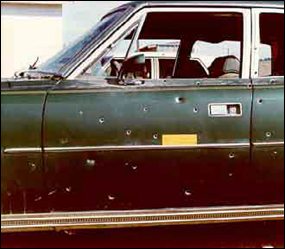
William's car riddled with bullets.

During this period of increased violence, on June 26, 1975, the reservation was the site of an armed confrontation between AIM activists and the FBI, which became known as the 'Pine Ridge Shootout'. Two FBI agents, Jack R. Coler and Ronald A. Williams, were killed and executed at close range. The agents had been following a car when they were shot at by its occupants and others. AIM activist Joe Stuntz was later killed by responding police. Stuntz was found wearing Coler's FBI jacket.

In two separate trials, the U.S. prosecuted participants in the firefight for the deaths of the agents. AIM members Robert Robideau and Dino Butler were acquitted after asserting that they had acted in self-defense. Leonard Peltier was extradited from Canada and tried separately because of the delay. He was convicted on two counts of first–degree murder for the deaths of the FBI agents, and sentenced to two consecutive terms of life in prison. Native American activist Leonard Peltier was released from a Florida prison after spending 50 years behind bars. President Joe Biden commuted the double life sentence for Peltier, which Peltier has claimed was an act of self-defense. Peltier will serve the remainder of his sentence on house arrest, but lead counsel Jenipher Jones calls it a step in the right direction.

“One which ensures dignity for Leonard, something which has long been denied him legally, medically and socially, but will now be restored in the way of quality medical care, family, community and cultural ties.” Peltier flew to his home in North Dakota on the Turtle Mountain Reservation after his release.

==== Murder of Anna Mae Aquash ====
On February 24, 1976, the body of Anna Mae Aquash, a Mi'kmaq activist and the most prominent woman in AIM, was found in the far northeast corner of the Pine Ridge Reservation. Missing since December 1975, she had been shot execution-style. At the time, some AIM people said that she was a government informant, but the FBI has denied that. In 1974, AIM had discovered that Douglas Durham, then head of security, was an FBI informant. Three federal grand juries were called to hear testimony on the Aquash murder: in 1976, 1982 and 1994, but it was more than a quarter of a century before any suspects were indicted and tried for the crime.

Two AIM members, Arlo Looking Cloud and John Graham, were convicted of her murder in 2004 and 2010 respectively, and sentenced to life in prison. Bruce Ellison, Leonard Peltier's lawyer since the 1970s, invoked his Fifth Amendment rights and refused to testify at the grand jury hearings on Looking Cloud, or at his trial in 2004. At trial, the federal prosecutor referred to Ellison as a co-conspirator in the Aquash case.

=== 21st century ===
Alcoholism among residents has been a continuing problem in the life of the reservation since its founding. Since 1999, activists from the Pine Ridge Reservation, AIM, and Nebraskans for Peace have worked to have beer sales shut down in nearby Whiteclay, Nebraska, a border town. Whiteclay sells millions of cans of beer annually, primarily to residents from the reservation in South Dakota, where alcohol possession and consumption is prohibited. In 2008, the documentary The Battle for Whiteclay, about the toll of alcoholism and activists' efforts to control beer sales, was released, which has attracted wide attention. The Nebraska legislature allocated funds in late 2010 for increased police patrols in Pine Ridge by the county sheriff's office, based 22 miles (35 km) away in Rushville.

While other tribes and reservations also prohibited alcohol at one time, many have since legalized its sales on their reservations. They use the revenues generated to improve health care and life on the reservation, and they prefer to directly control the regulation of alcohol sales and police its use. A 2007 survey found that 63% of federally recognized tribes in the lower 48 states have legalized liquor sales on their reservations. They include the nearby Sicangu Oyate or Brulé Sioux at the Rosebud Indian Reservation, also located in South Dakota. In 2006, the Omaha Nation in northeastern Nebraska started requiring payment of tribal license fees and sales taxes by liquor stores located in towns within its reservation boundaries in order to benefit in the revenues generated by alcohol sales.

Activists at Pine Ridge have worked to persuade Nebraska to enforce its own laws and support the tribe's prohibition. In 2004 the Oglala Sioux Tribe voted down a referendum to legalize alcohol sales, and in 2006 the tribal council voted to maintain the ban on alcohol sales, rather than taking on the benefits and responsibility directly.

At a discussion at Bellevue University on April 2, 2010, Lance Morgan, CEO of Ho-Chunk, Inc.—the development corporation of the Winnebago Reservation—said the Oglala Sioux needed to concentrate on economic development. He believes that poverty is at the heart of its people's problems. The Winnebago used revenues from a casino and alcohol sales at their reservation in eastern Nebraska to build an economic development corporation. It now employs 1,400 people in 26 subsidiaries. With its revenues, the Winnebago have been able to build a hospital, a new school and $1 million in new housing. Kevin Abourezk reported that Stew Magnuson—the author of The Death of Raymond Yellow Thunder, a study of issues related to the Pine Ridge reservation and its border towns—described alcohol prohibition at the reservation "as a complete failure." Magnuson said, "Whenever you have prohibition, you're going to have places like Whiteclay." He thought prohibition contributed to bootlegging on the reservation.

On February 9, 2012, the Oglala Sioux Tribe filed a lawsuit in U.S. District Court of Nebraska against the four liquor stores in Whiteclay, Nebraska, as well as the beverage distributors and the brewery companies who make it. The suit, Oglala Sioux Tribe v. Jason Schwarting, Licensee of Arrowhead Inn, Inc. et al, sought $500 million in damages for the "cost of health care, social services and child rehabilitation caused by chronic alcoholism on the reservation, which encompasses some of the nation's most impoverished counties." The suit claims that the defendants knowingly and willingly sell excessive amounts of alcohol, knowing that most of it is smuggled onto the reservation, in violation of Pine Ridge Indian Reservation and Federal law. The defendants listed in the suit are the following:

- Anheuser-Busch InBev Worldwide, Inc.
- SAB Miller d/b/a Miller Brewing Company
- Molson Coors Brewing Company
- Miller Coors, LLC
- Pabst Brewing Company
- Pivo, Inc. d/b/a High Plains Budweiser. President, Treasurer: Jeffrey J. Scheinost. Secretary: Cynthia A. Scheinost. Director: Marykate Scheinost
- Dietrich Distributing Co., Inc. President, Director, Treasurer: John D. Dietrich
- Coors Distributing of West Nebraska d/b/a Coors of West Nebraska; President, Treasurer, Director: James K. Raymond, Treasurer, Director: Evelyn K. Raymond
- Klemm Distributing Inc.: President: Robert (Bob) F. Klemm, Secretary: Barrett R. Klemm d/b/a Arrowhead Distributing, Inc. President: Patrick A, O'Neal. Secretary: Greg Burkholder, Treasurer: Kent O'Neal
- Jason Schwarting d/b/a Arrowhead Inn, Inc. President: Jason Schwarting, Secretary: Vic Clarke
- Sanford Holdings, LLC d/b/a D&S Pioneer Service. Corporation Members: Doug Sanford, Steve Sanford
- Stuart J. Kozal d/b/a/ Jumping Eagle Inn. Owners: Stuart J. Kozal, Lillie I. Norman
- Clay M. Brehmer and Daniel J. Brehmer d/b/a State Line Liquor

On August 14, 2013, voters voted to end prohibition and legalize alcohol, so the tribe can use the profits for education and detoxification and treatment centers.

== Demographics ==
In a 2005 interview, Cecilia Fire Thunder, the first female president of the Oglala Sioux Tribe, noted, "[Sixty-eight] percent of the college graduates on the reservation are women. Seventy percent of the jobs are held by women. Over 90 percent of the jobs in our schools are held by women."

- The 2010 U.S. census counted 18,834 individuals living on the Pine Ridge Reservation. The vast majority, 16,906, identified as American Indian. Much of the non-Native population is found in the community of Martin, South Dakota.
- 90.60% of residents are unemployed in Pine Ridge, South Dakota.
- 53.75% of the residents live below the Federal poverty level.
- Average per capita income in Oglala Lakota County is $8,768 and ranks as the "poorest" county in the nation.
- The infant mortality rate is five times higher than the national average.
- Native American amputation rates due to diabetes are three to four times higher than the national average.
- Death rate due to diabetes is three times higher than the national average.
- Teen suicide is four times the national average.
- The average life expectancy on Pine Ridge is 66.81 years, one of the lowest in the United States. In 2004, the average life expectancy was just 48 years for men and 52 years for women.

== Tribal government ==
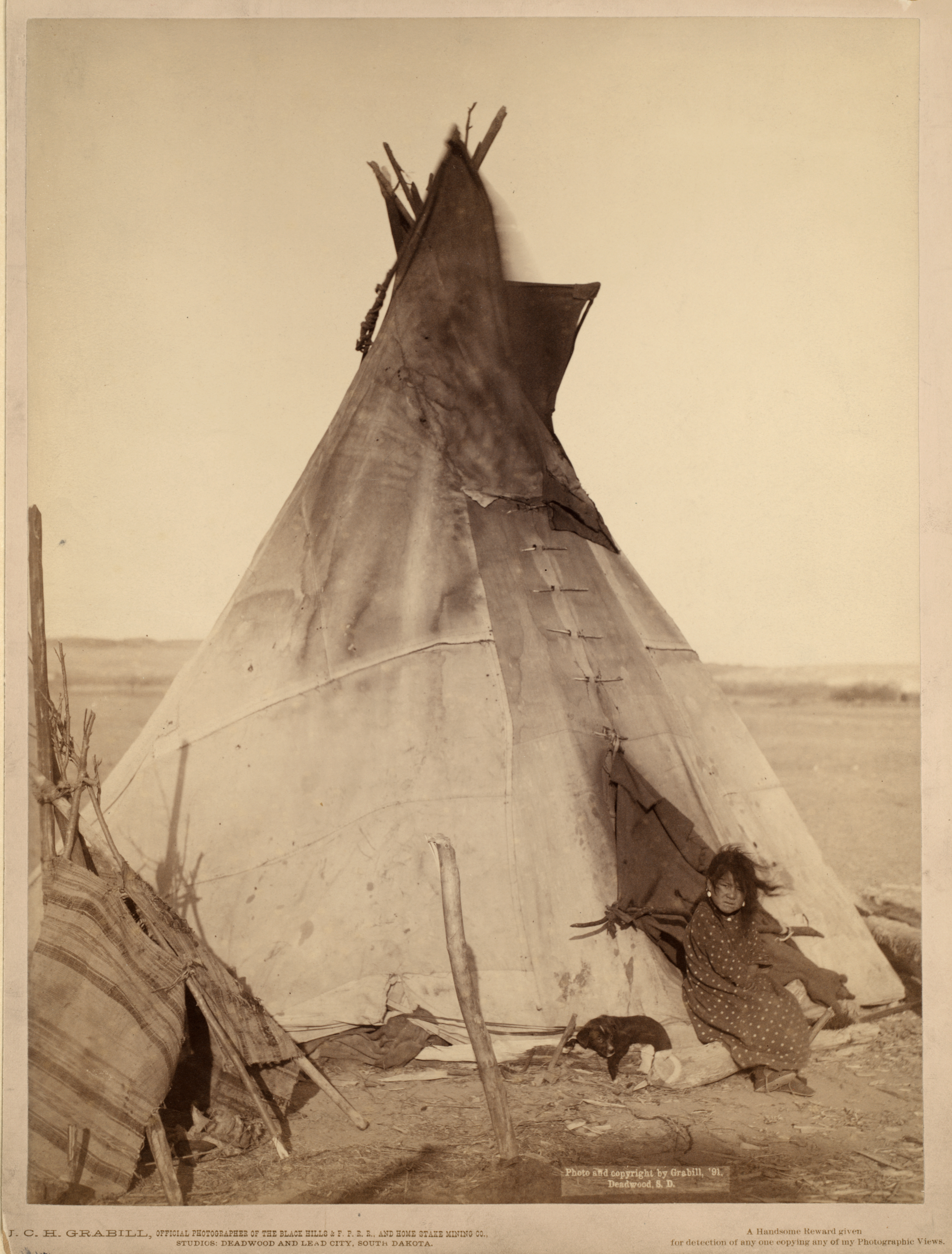
An Oglala girl in front of a tipi, 1891

The reservation is governed by the eighteen-member Oglala Sioux Tribal Council, who are elected officials rather than traditional clan life leaders, in accordance with the Indian Reorganization Act of 1934. The Executive Officers of the council are the President (also called Chairman), Vice President, Secretary, and Treasurer. Primary elections are held in October and the general election in November.

The President and Vice-President are elected at large by voters to a term of office of two years; the Secretary and Treasurer are appointed by the Tribal Council. Council members serve a term of two years. There are nine election districts on the reservation. One representative is elected for each 1,000 tribe members.

A Constitution was approved on January 15, 1936, with amendments approved on December 24, 1969; December 3, 1985; July 11, 1997.

=== Politics ===
While many residents have continued to struggle with the tribal government, BIA and other federal representatives, some have become more politically active in other ways. In 2002, the Pine Ridge Reservation was part of a statewide voter registration campaign organized by the Democratic Party. That year, Oglala Lakota candidates won offices in Bennett County; since the 1990s, Native Americans (mostly Lakota) have become a majority of the county's population. Charles Cummings was elected as county sheriff, Gerald 'Jed' Bettelyoun to one of the positions as county commissioner, and Sandy Flye became the first Native American elected to a seat on the county school board. Statewide turnout by Native Americans helped elect the Democratic candidate Tim Johnson to the U.S. Senate by a narrow margin.

In 1992, John Yellow Bird Steele was elected president of the OST, the first of what would become a record-setting seven terms as president. Despite winning seven elections, Steele only won re-election once, in 2002. In most cases, he was defeated when seeking re-election, only to come back and defeat his successor in the next election (or, in the case of the 2006 election, to defeat the person serving out the rest of his successor's term).

In 2004, Cecilia Fire Thunder became the first woman elected president of the OST, defeating the incumbent Steele and Russell Means. In 2005 she led negotiations with Nebraska to strengthen law enforcement in Whiteclay by hiring more Oglala tribal police and having them deputized by Nebraska to patrol in the town. The town sells massive quantities of alcohol to the Lakota, although it is illegal on the reservation. The "historic agreement" was signed by Fire Thunder following approval by the tribal council, the Nebraska Governor Dave Heineman and State Attorney General Jon Bruning.

On March 21, 2006, Fire Thunder announced her plan to bring a Planned Parenthood clinic to the reservation to improve health services to women. The South Dakota state legislature had recently passed a stringent abortion law. In May 2006, the Oglala Sioux tribal council unanimously voted to ban all abortions on the reservation, regardless of the circumstances. The council also voted to suspend Fire Thunder for 20 days pending an impeachment hearing.

On June 29, 2006, the tribal council voted to impeach Fire Thunder: it said that founding the clinic was outside her authority and she had failed to consult with them. Her two-year term would have expired in October 2006. In November 2006, state voters reviewed the law passed by the state legislature, and they overwhelmingly defeated the ban on abortions without exceptions, by 55.57 percent to 44.43 percent. A ban with exceptions was proposed in 2008, and state voters rejected that by a margin of 55.21 percent to 44.79 percent.

The U.S. Congress supported Fire Thunder's tribal law enforcement initiative, earmarking $200,000 over two years to pay for the increased cost of OST police patrols in Whiteclay. By May 2007, the tribe had spent none of the money. Fire Thunder's impeachment and tribal political conflict appeared to prevent its implementing the agreement. During 2006 and 2007, tribal activists tried to blockade the road inside the reservation to confiscate beer being illegally brought in. The OST police chief complained of having insufficient money and staff to control the beer traffic. The tribe lost the earmarked funds and let the initiative lapse.

In November 2008, Theresa Two Bulls, a Democratic State Senator for South Dakota since 2004, became the second woman elected president of the OST. She succeeded Steele and defeated Russell Means. When the reservation had a rash of suicides in late 2009, she declared a state of emergency and organized a call-in to President Barack Obama. She organized services during a blizzard to assist residents in outlying areas on the reservation.

Steele was re-elected in 2010, defeating Two Bulls. Bryan Brewer was elected as Tribal president in November 2012, defeating the incumbent Steele with 52% of the vote. A retired educator and school administrator, he was new to tribal politics. He worked to develop housing and discourage alcoholism, even leading a protest against Whiteclay alcohol sales. The journalist Brian Ecoffey noted that Brewer represented a "new direction" for the tribe, as he had not held political office before. Steele then defeated Brewer in 2014, starting what would be Steele's last term.

Troy "Scott" Weston represented the Porcupine District in the 2010 and 2012 administrations; Weston was elected OST President in 2016 beating Steele, the incumbent, in a landslide victory. The Rapid City Journal reported that nearly 2/3 of voters at the polls cast their ballot for Weston.

In national elections, Pine Ridge is politically divided: the western half of the reservation (Oglala Lakota County) votes overwhelmingly Democratic at the national level, while the eastern half (Bennett and Jackson Counties) trends heavily Republican. In local politics, the Oglala are active in electing tribal members to the State House and Senate, with both Democrats and Republicans finding success on the reservation.

=== Federal, state, and tribal law ===
The Oglala Sioux Tribe maintains legal jurisdiction over all crimes committed on the reservation by tribal members, non-reservation Indians, and those willing to relinquish authority to the tribal courts. Felony crimes and others which have been specifically assumed by the federal government, as defined by various acts of the U.S. Congress, are outside their jurisdiction and are prosecuted by the BIA and FBI. The ruling of the Supreme Court of the United States in Ex parte Crow Dog (1883) marked the high point of Indian sovereignty in law enforcement on reservations; since then federal legislation and subsequent Supreme Court decisions have reduced Native American sovereignty in this area.

Public Law 280, enacted by Congress in 1953 and substantially amended in 1968, allows for states to assume jurisdiction on Indian reservations if approved by referendum by the affected reservations. In South Dakota, Public Law 280 is applied only to state highways running through reservations.

Landmark cases affecting tribal criminal law include:

- Ex parte Crow Dog, 109 U.S. 556 (1883): On August 5, 1881, Crow Dog, a Brulé Lakota subchief, shot and killed the Oglala principal chief Chief Spotted Tail, on the Rosebud Indian Reservation. A grand jury was convened, and Crow Dog was tried and convicted in Dakota Territorial court in Deadwood, South Dakota, and sentenced to death. In 1883 his lawyers petitioned for writs of habeas corpus and certiorari; his case was argued in November 1883 before the U.S. Supreme Court. In a unanimous decision, the court ruled that, according to the provisions of the Treaty of Fort Laramie, the Dakota Territorial court had no jurisdiction over the Rosebud reservation; it overturned Crow Dog's conviction. In response to this ruling, Congress passed the Major Crimes Act in 1884, defining crimes that would be prosecuted under federal law.
- Major Crimes Act, 18 U.S.C. § 1: Congress gave federal authorities concurrent jurisdiction over seven major crimes committed on a reservation, regardless of whether one of the parties was Indian. This legislation reduced the criminal jurisdiction previously held by tribal courts.
- United States v. Quiver, 241 U.S. 602 (1916): Congress left to the Indian Tribal Courts jurisdiction over all crimes not taken by the Federal government.
- Iron Crow v. Oglala Sioux Tribe, 231 F.2d 89 (8th Cir. 1956): Indian Tribal Courts have inherent jurisdiction over all matters not taken over by the Federal government.
- Oliphant v. Suquamish Indian Tribe, 435 U.S. 191 (1978): Indian Tribes do not have inherent criminal jurisdiction over non-Indians absent Congressional authority.
- United States v. Wheeler, 435 U.S. 313 (1978): Indian Tribes have inherent powers to punish offenses against Tribal laws when committed by Tribal members.

==== Law enforcement ====
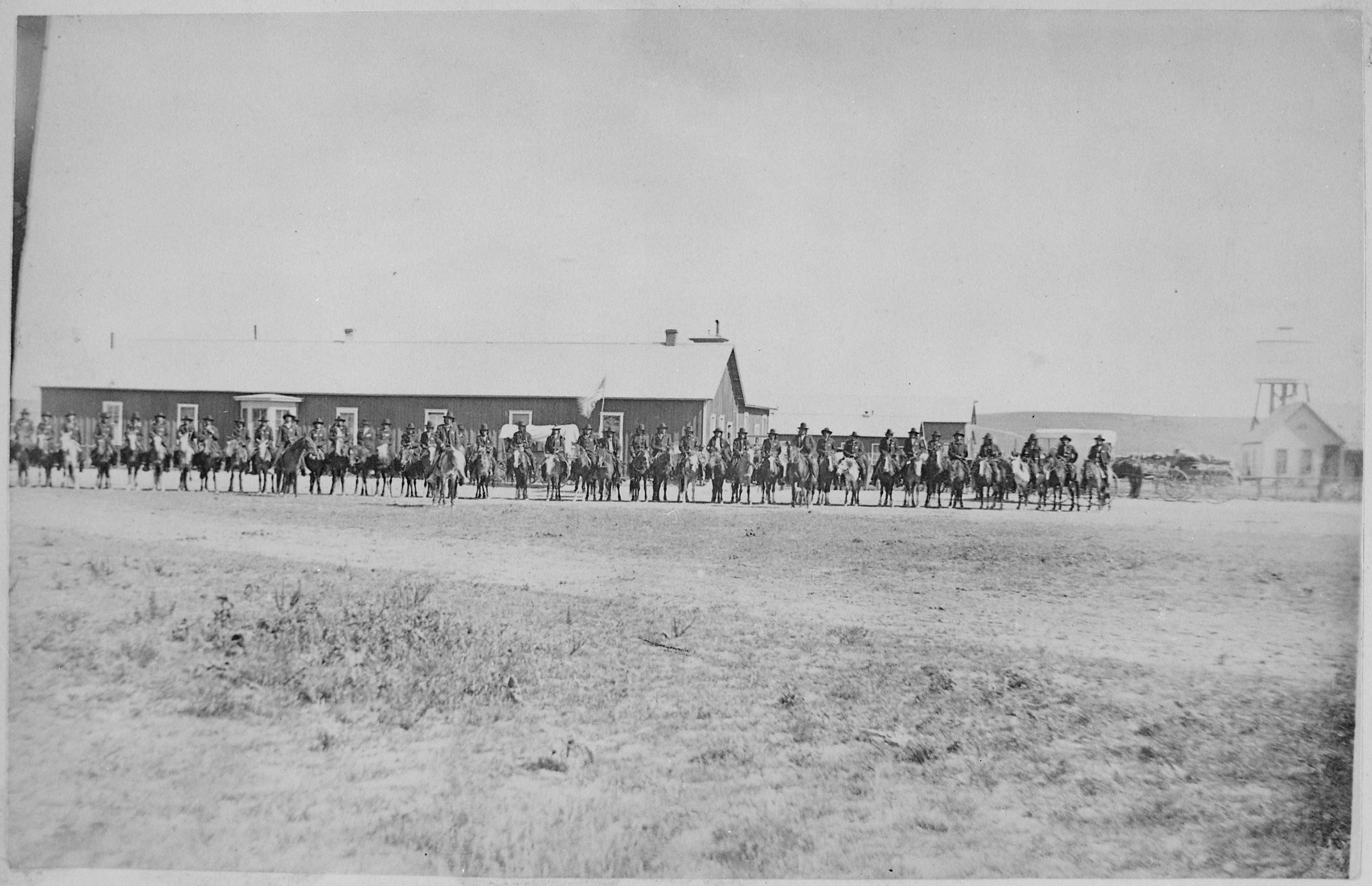
Sioux Indian police lined up on horseback in front of Pine Ridge Agency buildings, Dakota Territory, August 9, 1882

In traditional Sioux society, law enforcement was performed by members of the warrior societies, such as the Kit Foxes, Badgers and Crow Owners, known as the akicitas. They maintained order in camp and during communal buffalo hunts. Each band would appoint one society as the official akicita group for the year. This custom prevailed for a short time after the Sioux were forced onto the reservations.

In 1878, Congress authorized the formation of an Indian police force to provide law enforcement in Indian Territory and upon reservations. They were superseded by police assigned and managed by the Bureau of Indian Affairs (BIA). The BIA police force is composed of members of various Native American tribes from throughout the United States, and personnel often do not belong to the nations they oversee.

Since the late 1970s, the Oglala Sioux Tribe has received Federal funding to maintain its own reservation police, supplemented by BIA personnel. The FBI has jurisdiction for any felony crimes committed upon the reservation. After the reservation police respond to the initial call, a BIA police person initiates the investigation and notifies the FBI.

The OST is developing a new Tribal Justice Center, to include the tribal courts and a restorative justice courtroom. The latter concept relates to traditional Lakota ideas about restoring the victim and offender to balance within the community. In practice, it is intended to bring together the affected parties in facilitated communication, together with members of the community; to settle on a form of reparation or compensation by the offender that is satisfactory to the victim, which may include money, public apology, and/or community service work; and to bring the offender quickly back within the community with its support for the future. As the process is being used at Kahnawake, a Mohawk reserve in Canada, the First Nation community works to intervene and settle issues before arrest.

== Social issues and economy ==
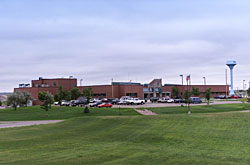
Pine Ridge Indian Health Service Hospital

Pine Ridge is the eighth-largest reservation in the United States and it is the poorest. The population of Pine Ridge suffer health conditions, including high mortality rates, depression, alcoholism, drug abuse, malnutrition and diabetes, among others. Reservation access to health care is limited compared to urban areas, and it is not sufficient. Unemployment on the reservation hovers between 80% and 85%, and 49% of the population live below the federal poverty level. Many of the families have no electricity, telephone, running water, or sewage systems; and many use wood stoves to heat their homes, depleting limited wood resources.

=== Health and healthcare ===
The population on Pine Ridge has among the shortest life expectancies of any group in the Western Hemisphere: approximately 47 years for males and 52 years for females in 2004. The infant mortality rate is five times the United States national average, and the adolescent suicide rate is four times the United States national average. Members of the reservation suffer from a disproportionately high rate of poverty and alcoholism. By 2011, a gang culture formed among Native American teenagers on the reservation. Young residents leave the reservation for larger cities.

The Pine Ridge Comprehensive Health Facility is the on-reservation hospital run by the Indian Health Service. The 110,000 square feet (10,000 m^{2}) inpatient hospital also has an outpatient clinic, dental clinic, and a surgery suite. The emergency room is staffed by two physicians as well as two physician assistants and a hospitalist in triage. The "Sick Kids" clinic is also based at the facility, with pediatricians on staff. During the COVID-19 pandemic, the hospital increased its capacity to provide respiratory and critical care, with assistance from Stanford Center for Innovation in Global Health.

In June 2011, the OST broke ground on a long-planned 60-bed nursing home facility, to be completed within two years. It was developed in cooperation with the federal government, the states of Nebraska and South Dakota. In October 2016, the Oglala Lakota Nursing Home, $6.5-million, 80-bed nursing home for the care of their elderly, opened in White Clay, Nebraska. The tribe borrowed money for a loan for the facility from the Mdewakanton Shakopee tribe, agreeing to "an independent advisory board and an experienced outside management firm." It is working with Native American Health Management, LLC (NAHM), to gain training for staff and oversight of operations until people gain experience.

==== Alcoholism ====
Alcoholism is widespread on the reservation, affecting an estimated 85 percent of the families. Tribal police estimate that 90 percent of the crimes are alcohol-related.

Because of historic problems with alcohol use by its members, the Oglala Sioux Tribe has prohibited the sale and possession of alcohol on the Pine Ridge Reservation since 1832. The exception was a brief period in the 1970s when on-reservation sales were tried. The town of Whiteclay, Nebraska (just over the South Dakota-Nebraska border), previously had approximately 12 residents and four liquor stores, which sold over 4.9 million 12-ounce cans of beer in 2010 almost exclusively to Oglala Lakota from the reservation (nearly 170 cans per person). The Whiteclay liquor stores were shut down by the state of Nebraska in 2017, though the store owners are appealing to have the stores reopened.

In 2021, the Thunder Valley Community Development Corporation acquired 48 acres of land in Whiteclay to build a holistic healing community which features initiaves in housing and homeownership, as well as support programs for local correctional facilities. The efforts of the Thunder Valley CDC are ongoing.

Fetal alcohol spectrum disorder (FASD) is a spectrum of anatomical structural anomalies, and behavioral, neurocognitive disabilities resulting from the exposure of a fetus to alcohol in the womb. The most severe manifestation within this spectrum is fetal alcohol syndrome (FAS). A quarter of the children born on the reservation are diagnosed with either FASD or FAS, resulting in lifelong challenges.

=== Education ===
The state of education on the reservation is severely lacking in multiple areas. The school drop-out rate is over 70%, and the teacher turnover rate is eight times that of the U.S. national average.

In 1971 the tribe founded the Oglala Lakota College, one of the earliest tribal colleges in the nation, and part of Native American institution building of the last 40 years. First started as a two-year community college, it has expanded to offer four-year baccalaureate degrees, as well as a master's in Lakota leadership. It is operated by tribal people, with a tribal board. In 2011, it had an enrollment of 1,400. Since 1994, tribal colleges have been classified as land-grant colleges by the U.S. Congress.

Oglala Lakota County School District (formerly the Shannon County School District) serves all areas in Oglala Lakota County. It includes:

- Lakota Tech High School
- Batesland Elementary School (preK-8th)
- Red Shirt School
- Rockyford Elementary School
- Wolf Creek Elementary School

Bennett County School District 03-1 serves areas in Bennett County.

The Kadoka School District 36-2 serves the portion of Jackson County that is a part of the reservation.

The portion in Sheridan County, Nebraska is zoned to Gordon-Rushville Public Schools.

Bureau of Indian Education (BIE)-operated and affiliated schools include:

- Crazy Horse School (K-12th)
- Little Wound School (K-12)
- Pine Ridge School (K-12)
- American Horse School (K-8)
- Porcupine School (K-8)
- Wounded Knee District School

Other K-12 Schools operating on the Reservation include:

- Lakota Waldorf School
- Loneman Day School (Isnawica Owayawa)
- Head Start at Oglala Lakota College

Private schools include:

- Red Cloud Indian School that consists of three schools: Our Lady of Lourdes School (K–8), Red Cloud Elementary (K-8) and Red Cloud High School.

==== Lakota Immersion Childcare ====
Globally, there are currently only 2,000 Lakota language speakers, and fewer than 1,000 at Pine Ridge. The age of the average Lakota speaker is 60, making it a "critically endangered" language.

In the fall of 2012, a new program was founded to combat the loss of the language and create a young generation of fluent Lakota speakers. Peter Hill, a former elementary teacher at the reservation who speaks Lakota, started the early childcare language immersion program from his own basement, initially serving five students with crowdsourced funding. In the program, students and teachers speak exclusively Lakota, with children eventually learning English as a second language. Over the last six years, the childcare program has expanded significantly to serve students ages one to five, and has additionally begun offering kindergarten and first grade. A continuing challenge for the school is creating teaching materials, since textbooks and other teaching resources are not typically printed in Lakota. Thus, creating new materials like children's books, apps, or videos, as well as translation of existing works into the language is crucial.

Beyond the immersion childcare, other efforts are underway to bring Lakota into community members' lives in relevant ways: basketball games are frequently announced in Lakota, after new words were coined and the coach began using them in practices and drills with the teams. The first news website written entirely in Lakota was launched in 2016.

=== Economy ===
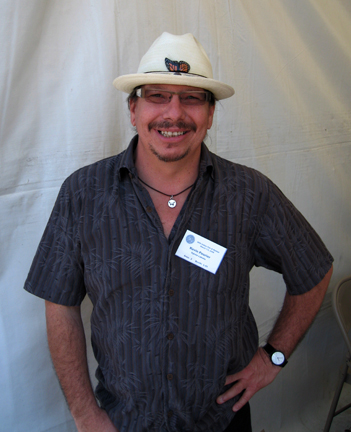
Kevin Pourier, contemporary Oglala artist, maintains a studio in the Medicine Root District of Pine Ridge.

As of 2011, the reservation has little economic development or industry. No discount stores are located on the reservation. Though its people receive $80 million per annum in federal monies, such as Social Security and veterans benefits, most of this money is spent largely in stores located off the reservation in Nebraska border towns, creating no net benefit for the tribe. As the journalist Stephanie Woodward noted, little money changes hands within the reservation.

As an example of the money that goes outside the reservation to border towns, the owner of Whiteclay's grocery store, Arrowhead Foods, said he "did more than a million dollars in business last year, with an entirely Native American clientele." Similarly, Nebraska State Senator LeRoy Louden, whose district includes Whiteclay, noted the recent construction of a Walmart superstore at Chadron, Nebraska, another border town. He said, "That store was built because of the reservation."

The tribe has prohibited the sale and consumption of alcohol on the reservation. Still, Pine Ridge residents support four liquor stores across reservation borders in the town of Whiteclay, Nebraska. In 2010, these businesses paid $413,932 in federal and state excise taxes on the sale of liquor, according to the Nebraska State Liquor Commission. Some residents have argued that the climbing rate of alcoholism on the reservation shows the failure of the prohibition policy. They argue that if the tribe legalized alcohol sales, it could keep much of their people's wealth from flowing to Nebraska, allowing for such monies to instead be directed toward the reservation's economy and health care services and new projects like building a detoxification facility and rehab clinic.

Despite the lack of formal employment opportunities on Pine Ridge, considerable agricultural production takes place on the reservation. Only a small percentage of the tribe directly benefits from agriculture, as land is leased to agricultural producers. According to the USDA, in 2002 there was nearly $33 million in receipts from agricultural production on Pine Ridge. Less than one-third of that income went to members of the tribe.

Most employment on the reservation is provided by community institutions, such as the tribal Oglala Lakota College, and other schools; the Bureau of Indian Affairs (BIA); and the U.S. Indian Health Service (IHS). In October 2016, the tribe opened an 80-bed nursing home; at full operation, it should employ 100 staff. The tribe is working on building a justice center and has advertised an art competition to decorate its spaces, including the tribal courts and a restorative justice courtroom.

Enterprises owned by the Oglala Sioux tribe include the Prairie Wind Casino, a Parks and Recreation Department, guided hunting, and cattle ranching and farming. The Oglala Sioux Tribe also operates the White River Visitor Center near the Badlands National Park. It has one radio station, KILI-FM in Porcupine.

In 1973 at the time of the Wounded Knee Incident, not one Native American worked for a South Dakota newspaper. In 1981 the Lakota journalist Tim Giago founded and published the independent Lakota Times on the reservation. (Most such newspapers have been owned by tribal governments.) He renamed it Indian Country Today in 1992, as he was providing more national coverage of Native American news.

In 1998 he sold the paper to the Oneida Nation; it was then the largest independent Native American paper in the country. It continues to operate the paper as part of a media network; Indian Country Today features regular political coverage that notes the increasing number of Native Americans gaining office at the local and state levels. Giago founded the Native American Journalists Association (NAJA) and has worked to recruit Native American students into journalism through its foundation, as well as to establish Indian studies in journalism schools.

Connie Smith started the Lakota Country Times, a weekly newspaper which she owns. It is the official legal newspaper for the Pine Ridge and Rosebud reservations. It also publishes material online. In 2009 it won first place for general excellence of its website from NAJA, and in 2010 won three prizes, including two for best articles.

Lakota Federal Credit Union, established to serve the financial needs of residents of the reservation, was established in 2012.

==== Industrial hemp ====
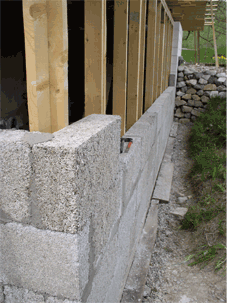
Industrial hemp is used to make Hempcrete, a material used for building concrete blocks, as well as other products. The Oglala were denied their sovereign right to grow industrial hemp by the federal government of the United States.

After doing research and noting the worldwide market for hemp, in July 1998, the Tribal Council approved 'industrial hemp agriculture' for the reservation. With demand high for the crop, three Lakota farmers, Tom Cook, his wife Loretta Afraid of Bear and American Horse, grandson of Chief American Horse, formed the Slim Butte Land-Use Association. To emphasize the issue of Sioux sovereignty in land use, they publicly announced the first planting of industrial hemp seeds on April 29, 2000, on the 132nd anniversary of the signing of the 1868 Fort Laramie Treaty, which established the reservation. The Association believed production of industrial hemp-based concrete could help solve the severe shortage of suitable dwellings on the reservation, as it is a sustainable construction material, and work for the unemployed. Hemp can also be processed to yield oil for cooking and other products.

Congress in 1968 prohibited the cultivation of Cannabis-related crops, including hemp, as part of anti-drug legislation, although hemp does not have the psychoactive properties of cannabis as a drug. Industrial hemp is legal in Canada. The law in the U.S. is enforced by the Drug Enforcement Administration (DEA). In August 2000 and July 2001, federal DEA agents destroyed industrial hemp crops on the Pine Ridge reservation. After the raid destroyed his crops, the farmer Alex White Plume appealed a DEA court order that prohibited his growing the crop, but the 8th U.S. Circuit Court of Appeals affirmed the district court ruling in United States v. White Plume (8th Cir. 2006), that the Lakota had to comply with DEA registration process and get a permit to cultivate hemp. The former crop is currently growing wild in the area.

The North Dakota legislature has authorized hemp growing statewide and issued the nation's first two state licenses to grow hemp. The licensed farmers may face DEA legal problems if they do not acquire DEA permits. As the DEA had not yet acted on their requests, in June 2007 the men filed a lawsuit seeking federal court permission to grow the crop without being subject to federal criminal charges.

==== Private enterprise at Pine Ridge ====
Members of the tribe have developed a variety of private enterprises, from arts to modern technologies. Numerous artists maintain private studios and use diverse media in both traditional Lakota artforms, such as parfleche and beadwork, and contemporary styles.

The Oglala are becoming involved in start-up tech companies, such as Lakota Solar Enterprises (LSE), started on the Pine Ridge Reservation in 2006 by Henry Red Cloud (a fifth-generation descendant of Chief Red Cloud) with help from the non-profit org Trees, Water and People. Lakota Solar Enterprises is active in education and training for the advancement of renewable and sustainable energy and technology with a focus of bringing employment opportunities to members of OST as well as other tribal nations throughout the United States. Such technologies include: solar heating and electricity; compressed earth blocks for structural use; geothermal heating; solar assisted irrigated farming, cellulose insulation, and wind generated power.

== Tourism ==
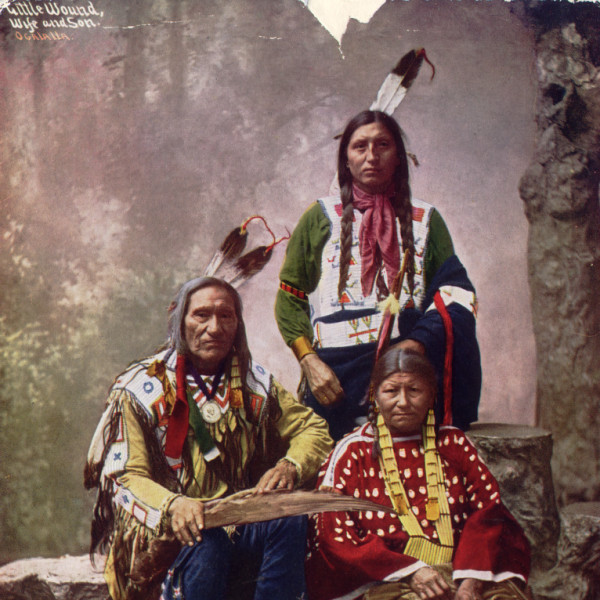
Chief Little Wound with his wife and son, 1899

=== History ===
- Wounded Knee Massacre and burial site. The events at Wounded Knee represents a significant event in Native American and United States history; it was the last significant clash between Native Americans and U.S. troops and was considered to be the closing of the Western Frontier. The trail that Spotted Elk and his band took on the reservation is marked with signs, including the spot where they surrendered to U.S. troops and were escorted to a site by Wounded Knee Creek.
- Stronghold Table: a remote mesa in what is now the Stronghold (South) Unit of Badlands National Park, which is administered by the tribe. Site of the last Ghost Dances prior to the Wounded Knee Massacre.
- Red Cloud Cemetery: location of the grave of Chief Red Cloud, as well as Bloody Knife (1840–1876), Chief of the Indian Scouts of the 7th Cavalry under General George Armstrong Custer. Bloody Knife was killed at the Battle of the Little Bighorn while assigned to Major Marcus Reno's detachment.

=== Cultural tourism ===
- Oglala Lakota Nation Pow Wow, an annual pow wow featuring dancers from various parts of the U.S.
- Badlands Ranch Resort: Started as private enterprise, it was purchased in July 2009 by the Oglala Sioux Tribe. It is located at the base of Badlands National Park.

=== Ecotourism ===
The Oglala Sioux Park & Recreation Authority offers eco-tours and hunting trips on the reservation as well as engaging in wildlife conservation work.

- Geology: The Badlands (Makhóšiča)- formed by erosion, represent over 65 million years of the earth's geological history starting from the late Cretaceous when the entire middle of the United States was covered by the Western Interior Seaway. The Pine Ridge area contain one of the largest deposits of mammal fossils from the Oligocene epoch.
- Paleontology: One of the most complete fossil accumulations in North America is found within the badlands. The rocks and fossils preserve evidence of ancient ecosystems and give scientists clues about how early mammal species lived.
- Flora: Pine Ridge is located in the Great Plains region, which encompasses the nation's largest grassland ecosystem. the northern portion of the reservation and Badlands National Park contain one of the largest expanses of mixed grass prairie in the United States.
- Fauna: In addition to bison, the reservation is also home to pronghorn (Antilocapra americana). There is a colony of endangered black-footed ferret, the only ferret native to North America, in the Conata Basin, which is also home to black-tailed prairie dogs.
- White River: A Missouri River tributary that flows 580 miles (930 km) through Nebraska and South Dakota. A variety of fish species suitable for sportfishing live in the river.

=== Casino ===
Prairie Wind Casino, which began operation in 1994 in three doublewide trailers, was upgraded with the completion of a $20 million casino, a 78-room hotel and a full-service restaurant in early 2007. The casino provides 250 jobs, most held by tribal residents, with revenues helping support education and social welfare efforts.

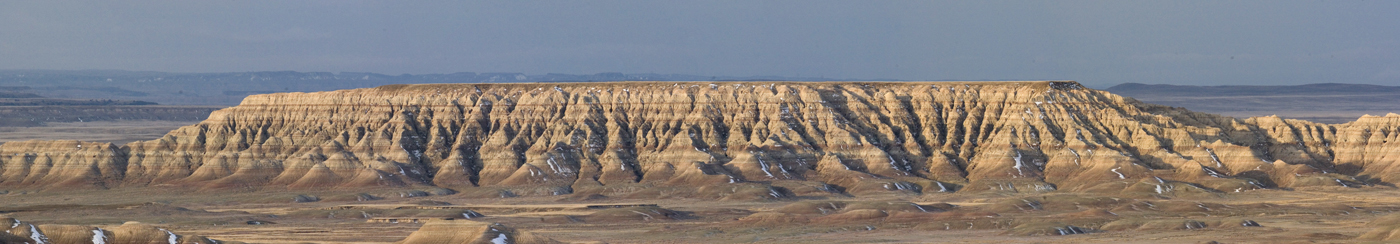
A type of mesa found in the Badlands National Park and along the northern border of the reservation

== Geography ==
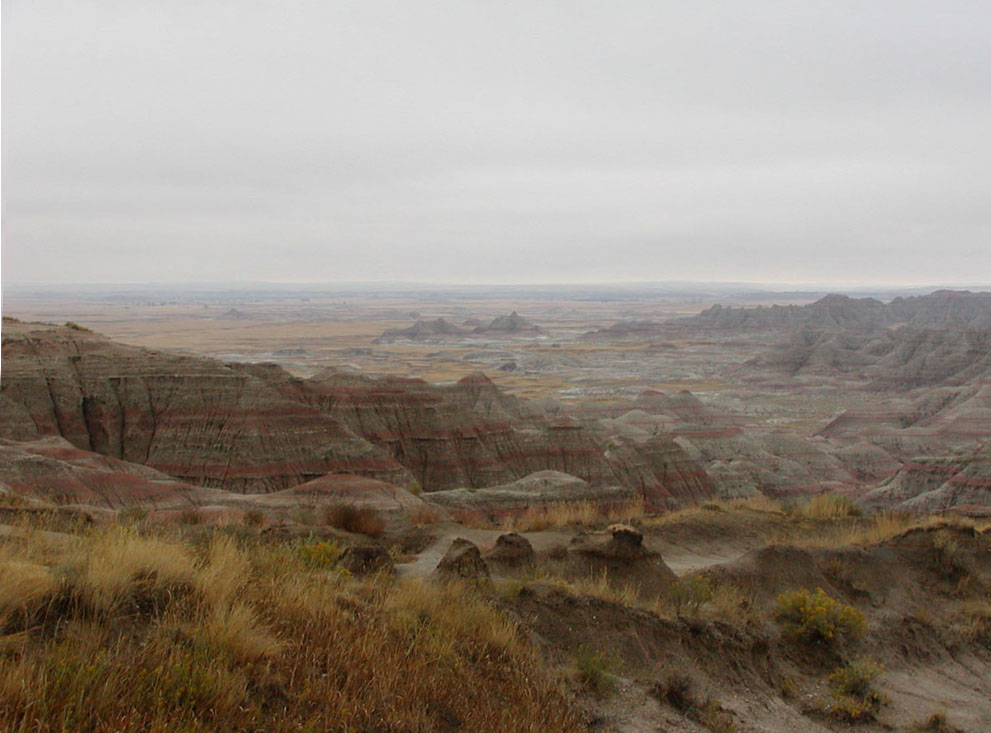
Badlands in the northern portion of Pine Ridge Indian Reservation

Located in southwest South Dakota, the reservation takes 3,400 square miles (8,800 km^{2}) of space. The nearest urban center, Rapid City, South Dakota, is 120 miles (190 km) from the center of the reservation.

The most inland point in North America is located within the reservation, near the town of Allen, and is 1,650 km (1,030 mi) from the nearest coastline.

Bennett County and Oglala Lakota County make up much of the reservation. The reservation takes up the southern portion of Jackson County. A small portion is in Sheridan County, Nebraska.

=== Topography ===
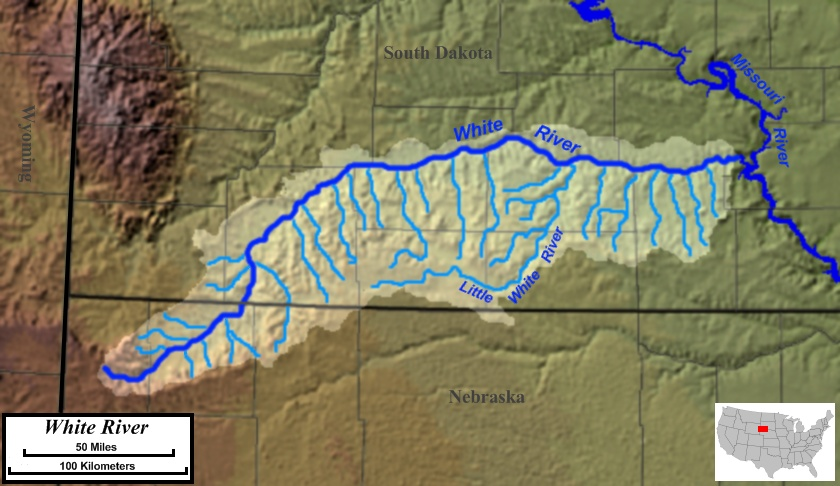
The White River and multiple tributaries cut across the reservation

The topography is generally rolling mixed grass prairie, interspersed in various location, especially to the north, into typical badlands topography. The higher elevations of the prairie are covered by wind blown sands that form dunes, blowouts, and thin sheets. The southern part of the reservation is crossed by Pine Ridge, which is probably a fault scarp, and which supports the growth of scattered pine and cedar trees. Well-developed sandhills are the dominant features along the southern boundary of the reservation, which extend into the sandhills region of Nebraska.

Only 84,000 acres (340 km^{2}) of the more than 2 million acres (8,100 km^{2}) of the reservation are considered land suitable for agricultural uses, and the climate, soil and water conditions are challenging. Many farmers among the Lakota can do little more than gain a subsistence living from the land.

The White River flows through the reservation. It was named for the water's white-gray color, a result of eroded sand, clay, and volcanic ash carried by the river. Draining a basin of about 10,200 square miles (26,000 km^{2}), the stream flows through a region of sparsely populated hills, plateaus, and badlands. It flows west to east through the reservation.

=== Geology ===
Deposition of sediments in the Badlands began 69 million years ago when an ancient sea, the Western Interior Seaway, stretched across what is now the Great Plains. After the sea retreated, successive land environments, including rivers and flood plains, continued to deposit sediments. Although the major period of deposition ended 28 million years ago, significant erosion of the Badlands did not begin until half a million years ago.

=== Climate ===
Climate data for Weather Station: Porcupine 11 N, ~17.0 miles Elevation: 2820 feet (-353 ft from town of Pine Ridge)
Month	Jan	Feb	Mar	Apr	May	Jun	Jul	Aug	Sep	Oct	Nov	Dec	Year
Mean daily maximum °F (°C)	33.0 (0.6)	39.2 (4.0)	48.5 (9.2)	59.4 (15.2)	70.0 (21.1)	80.3 (26.8)	88.0 (31.1)	87.6 (30.9)	78.0 (25.6)	64.4 (18.0)	45.6 (7.6)	36.2 (2.3)	59.1 (15.1)
Mean daily minimum °F (°C)	6.9 (−13.9)	12.0 (−11.1)	20.2 (−6.6)	30.0 (−1.1)	42.4 (5.8)	51.9 (11.1)	57.8 (14.3)	55.2 (12.9)	43.2 (6.2)	30.1 (−1.1)	17.7 (−7.9)	8.7 (−12.9)	34.0 (1.1)
Average precipitation inches (mm)	.40 (10)	.47 (12)	1.00 (25)	1.90 (48)	2.81 (71)	2.95 (75)	2.66 (68)	1.57 (40)	1.35 (34)	1.43 (36)	.60 (15)	.38 (9.7)	16.64 (423)
Source: NOAA

== Flora and fauna ==
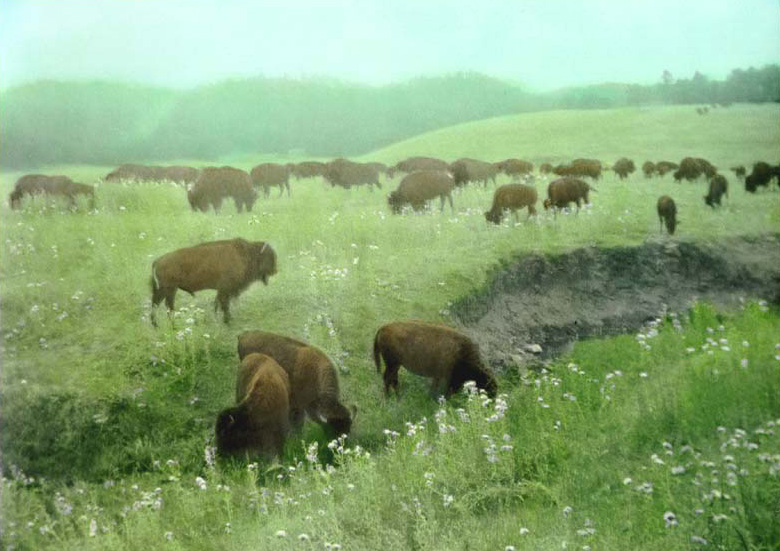
A herd of bison (tȟatȟáŋka) grazing on the mixed grass prairie, 1948. The Oglala today maintain a herd on the reservation.

=== Flora ===
The mixed grass prairie contains both ankle-high and waist-high grasses, and fills a transitional zone between the moister tall-grass prairie to the east and the more arid short-grass prairie to the west.

Biologists have identified more than 400 different plant species growing in Badlands National Park. Each plant species is adapted to survive the conditions prevalent in the mixed-grass prairie ecosystem. The climate here is one of extremes: hot, cold, dry, windy and stormy with blizzards, floods, droughts, and fires. Grasses dominate the landscape.

The short-grass and tall-grass prairies intergrade just east of an irregular line that runs from northern Texas to Oklahoma, Kansas, and Nebraska, northwestward into west-central North Dakota and South Dakota. The perimeter is not well defined because of the array of short-stature, intermediate, and tall-grass species that make up an ecotone between the short-grass and tall-grass prairies (Bragg and Steuter 1996). In general, the mixed-grass prairie is characterized by the warm-season grasses of the short-grass prairie to the west and the cool- and warm-season grasses, which grow much taller, to the east. Because of this ecotonal mixing, the number of plant species found in mixed-grass prairies exceeds that in other prairie types. Since 2000, hemp has grown wild here, following a failed attempt in growing it commercially, as a local ordinance allows. The attempt was shut down by the DEA and several other agencies.

=== Fauna ===
The mixed grass prairie is home to a variety of animals. In Badlands National Park, scientists have recorded the presence of 37 mammal species, nine reptile species, six amphibian species, 206 bird species, and 69 butterfly species. The rare swift fox and endangered black footed ferret are among two of the various mammal species found in the Badlands region. Both species feed on the black-tailed prairie dog.

== Transportation ==
=== Roads ===
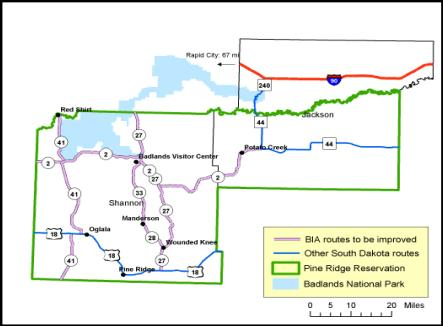
Major roads through Jackson and Oglala Lakota Counties

- I-90 passes east to west through Jackson County and Pennington County just north of the reservation with multiple exits in both counties
- US 18 is an east–west U.S. highway which passes through the reservation. The western terminus is in Orin, Wyoming, at an interchange with Interstate 25. Its eastern terminus of U.S. 18 is in downtown Milwaukee, Wisconsin. However, U.S. 18 runs concurrent with other U.S. routes from its western terminus to Mule Creek Junction, Wyoming. U.S. 18 is one of the original United States highways of 1926.
- SD 44, also known as the "Rimrock Highway" or "Rimrock Drive" connects Rapid City, South Dakota, with U.S. Highway 385 at Pactola Junction, just north of Pactola Lake. One of the most scenic drives in the Black Hills, SD 44 follows Rapid Creek, a blue-ribbon trout fishery, much of the way, and also follows much of the alignment of the old Rapid City, Black Hills and Western Railroad, also known as the Crouch Line. SD 44 passes through the Jackson County portion of the reservation
- SD 73 (not shown on FDOT map) is a state route that runs north to south through the Jackson County portion of the reservation. It begins at the Nebraska border north of Merriman, Nebraska, as a continuation of Nebraska Highway 61. It runs to the North Dakota border, where it continues as North Dakota Highway 49. It is 250 miles (402 kilometers) in length.
- SD 407 (not shown on FDOT map) is a short state highway in Oglala Lakota County which turns into Nebraska Highway 87 (N-87), SD 407-N-87, serves as a connector route between U.S. Route 18 (U.S. 18) in Pine Ridge, South Dakota, and U.S. 20 in Rushville, Nebraska.

=== Airports ===
Pine Ridge Airport, owned by the Oglala Sioux Tribe, is located two miles (3 km) east of the town of Pine Ridge. The unattended airport has four asphalt runways; runways 12&30 are 5,000 ft × 60 ft (1,524 m × 18 m), runways 6&24 (currently closed) are 3,003 ft × 50 ft (915 m × 15 m). The airport is in poor repair and is used predominately for government flights. The nearest commercial airport to Pine Ridge is Chadron Municipal Airport (CDR / KCDR) in Chadron, Nebraska, approximately 30 miles (48 km) south. The nearest major airport is Rapid City Regional Airport, in Rapid City, South Dakota, approximately 80 miles (130 km) NE. The closest international airport is Denver International Airport in Denver, Colorado approximately 240 miles (390 km) SW.

=== Public transportation ===
On January 30, 2009, the Oglala Sioux Tribe of Pine Ridge held the grand opening of their public transportation system, a bus service with multiple vehicles to cover the entire reservation.

== Communities ==
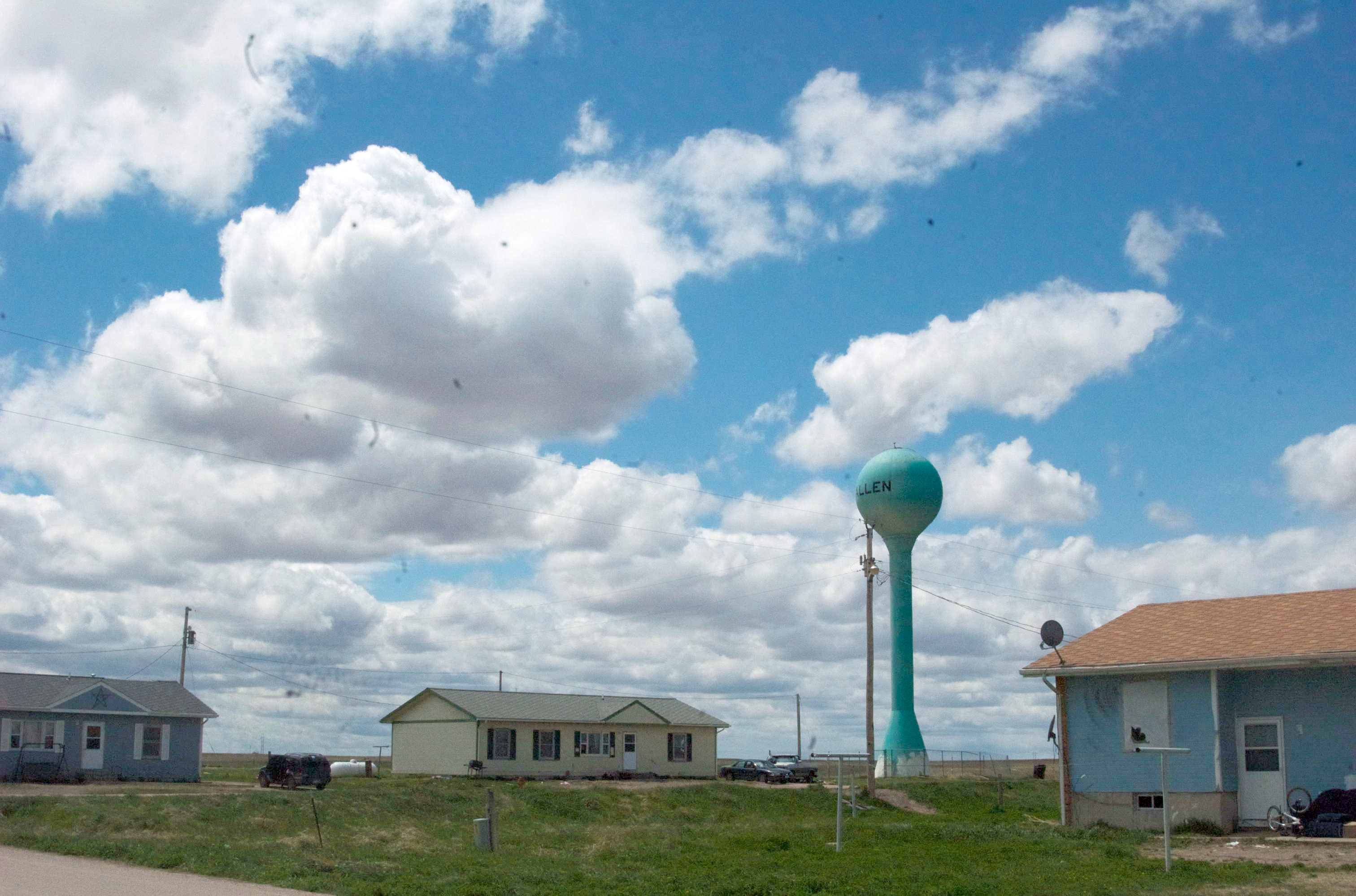
Allen, South Dakota, on the Pine Ridge Indian Reservation.

=== Nebraska ===
- Whiteclay

=== South Dakota ===
- Allen
- Batesland
- Kyle
- Manderson-White Horse Creek
- Oglala
- Pine Ridge
- Porcupine
- Wakpamni Lake
- Wanblee
- Wounded Knee

== Notable leaders and residents ==
- Albert Afraid of Hawk (1879–1900, Oglala), member of Buffalo Bill's Wild West Show
- American Horse (Wašícuŋ Tašuŋke), an Oglala Lakota chief during the Sioux Wars of the 1870s
- Amos Bad Heart Bull (Waŋblí Wapaha), a ledger artist and tribal historian
- SuAnne Big Crow (1974–1992) led the Pine Ridge High School basketball team to state championship in 1989
- William "Hawk" Birdshead, (Oglala, Hunkpapa, Cheyenne, Arapaho) philanthropist, suicide prevention, award-winning filmmaker
- Black Elk (Heȟaka Sapa; 1863–1950), an Oglala holy man, and second cousin to Crazy Horse
- Alice Blue Legs, (1925–2003) master quillworker
- Regina Brave, an Oglala Lakota activist
- Tokala Clifford, actor
- Chief Crazy Horse (Tašuŋke Witko), war chief of the Oglala, c. 1870

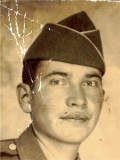
Pat Cuny served in the 83rd Infantry Division in WWII.

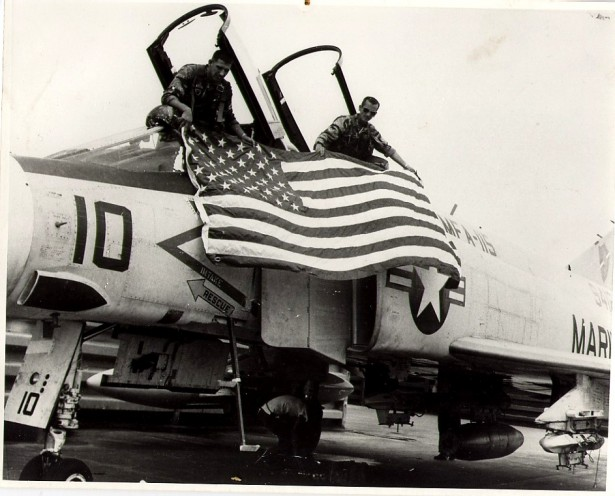
U.S.M.C. pilot Ed McGaa (Eagle Man) and his co-pilot unfurl the US flag on their F-4B Phantom fighter jet.

- Pat Cuny (Oglala), 83rd Infantry Division US Soldier
- Sarah Eagle Heart, Emmy Award-winning producer, writer, and activist
- Cecilia Fire Thunder, first woman elected as president of the Oglala Sioux Tribe
- Tim Giago (1934–2022) Newspaper Publisher, Writer
- Brady Jandreau, former rodeo rider and star of The Rider (2017)
- Kicking Bear (Oglala), chief of the Miniconjou Lakota Sioux tribe.
- Eddie Little Sky, actor.
- Little Wound (Taópi Čík'ala: 1835–1899, Oglala).
- Chief Long Wolf (1833–1892), warrior of Battle of the Little Bighorn and the Sioux Wars.
- Old Chief Smoke (Šóta; 1774–1864), an early Oglala chief and Shirt Wearer
- Chief Red Cloud (1822–1909, Oglala), a chief
- Philip N. Hogen, United States Attorney for the District of South Dakota 1981–1991
- Ed McGaa (Eagle Man), author, attorney and veteran
- Ola Mildred Rexroat, only Native American pilot in the Women Airforce Service Pilots
- William Mervin "Billy" Mills, also known as Makata Taka Hela, is the second Native American to win an Olympic gold medal and the only American ever to win the Olympic gold in the 10,000 meter run
- Sean Sherman, food educator, caterer, author of The Sioux Chef's Indigenous Kitchen
- Teton Saltes, Member of the Oglala Sioux Tribe and NFL offensive lineman
- Chief Spotted Elk, called Big Foot by the U.S. soldiers. His band of Miniconjou Sioux were massacred at Wounded Knee in 1890.
- Touch the Clouds, Oglala chief
- JoAnn Tall, environmental activist at Pine Ridge
- Theresa Two Bulls, legislature, state senator (2004–2008), president of Oglala Sioux Tribe (2008–2010)
- Richard Wilson (April 29, 1934 – January 31, 1990), tribal chairman (1972 to 1976) during the Wounded Knee Incident
- John Yellow Bird Steele, President of the Oglala Sioux Tribe (1992–2010)
- They Fear Even His Horses (Tȟašúŋke Kȟokípȟapi) (1836–1893)
- Charles Trimble (Oglala Lakota Nation), activist and former executive director of the National Congress of American Indians (1972–1978)
