= Lakota =

Lakota may refer to:

== People and language ==
- Lakota people, a Native American people also known as the Teton Sioux
- Lakota language, spoken by the Lakota people

== Place names ==
- Lakota, Ivory Coast
  - Lakota Department
- Lakota, Iowa, United States
- Lakota, North Dakota, United States

== Other uses ==
- Lakota (club), a nightclub in Bristol, England
- Lakota (surname), including a list of people with the name
- "Lakota", a song by Joni Mitchell from her 1988 album Chalk Mark in a Rain Storm
- Eurocopter UH-72 Lakota, a helicopter

== See also ==
- Camp Lakota (disambiguation)
- Lakota Local School District (disambiguation)
- Lakota High School (disambiguation)
- Republic of Lakotah proposal, a proposed independent republic in North America for the Lakota people
