= Maȟpíya Lúta (school) =

Private school in South Dakota, U.S.

- Maȟpíya Lúta Owáyawa
- Official Logo

Location
- HQ and Red Cloud Schools: 100 Mission Drive, Pine Ridge postal address, South Dakota, Oglala Lakota County 57770 USA; Our Lady of Lourdes Elementary School: 500 Lourdes Lane Porcupine, South Dakota 57772; 43°04′42″N 102°35′10″W

Information
- Type: Private
- Religious affiliations: Roman Catholic (Jesuit)
- Established: 1888; 138 years ago
- Sister school: Our Lady of Lourdes Elementary School
- Superintendent: Moira Coomes
- President: Rev. David Mastrangelo, SJ
- Principal (HS): Vikki Eagle Bear
- Principal (ES): Randilynn Boucher-Giago
- Chaplain: Fr. Peter Klink, SJ
- Grades: K–12
- Gender: Coeducational
- Colors: Blue and White
- Athletics conference: SDHSAA
- Team name: Crusaders
- Accreditation: NCA
- School fees: $100/yr. or $200/ family
- Affiliations: JSEA
- Athletics: Director, Christian McGhee
- Website: mahpiyaluta.org

Red Cloud Indian School, Inc., doing work under the name Maȟpíya Lúta Owáyawa (Lakota: Maȟpíya Lúta Owáyawa), formerly doing so as Red Cloud Indian School, is a private, Catholic, K–12 school run by the Jesuits in Oglala Lakota County, South Dakota. It is located in the Diocese of Rapid City and serves Oglala Lakota Native American children on the Pine Ridge Indian Reservation.

The main campus has a Pine Ridge postal address. It is not in the Pine Ridge census-designated place. This campus includes Red Cloud Elementary School (Lakota: Maȟpíya Lúta Hukhúčiyela Owáyawa) and Red Cloud High School (Lakota: Maȟpíya Lúta Waŋkáwapȟaya Owáyawa).

The other campus, Our Lady of Lourdes Elementary School (Lakota: Wíŋyaŋ Wakȟáŋ Owáyawa), is adjacent to the Porcupine CDP and has a Porcupine address.

== History ==
The school was founded in 1888 as Holy Rosary Mission. The Jesuits and Sisters of St. Francis of Penance and Christian Charity founded the institution at the request of Chief Red Cloud. Once the school had been approved, the construction of the main mission building began. All of the bricks for the building were made from local clay and lime on the grounds of what is today Red Cloud Indian School's Pine Ridge campus. It was the only two-story building in the area. The four-school, K–12 school system was renamed Red Cloud in 1969.

The student population quickly grew to more than 100 students. Students were divided into three classes: one for all younger students and separate classes for older girls and older boys. The older students spent half their day learning reading, writing, and arithmetic and the other half performing domestic duties to keep the mission running. The young women often worked in the kitchen and laundry rooms, while the young men spent their time in the wood and metal shops, or farming the land.

The second K-8 school, Our Lady of Lourdes, became a part of the Red Cloud System in 1931. It had been established in 1929.

Red Cloud High School opened in 1937. Five students graduated from the school in 1942, with Oryal Cuny as the salutatorian and Lyle Clifford as the valedictorian. Classes became integrated and the boarding parts of the school were closed. The farms associated with the school were converted to various uses like football fields, field houses, and parking lots.

The school began closing dormitories in the 1960s.

In 1969, Holy Rosary Mission was officially renamed Red Cloud Indian School, both as a token of respect for the man whose work had made the school possible and as part of a program of re-identification to emphasize its native-American roots over cultural imperialism, and the lasting bond between groups from two separate cultures who wanted to enhance the best parts of both worlds to serve the people of the Pine Ridge Indian Reservation.

In 1980 the remaining dormitories closed.

In 2022 the board of directors decided to begin using the name "Maȟpíya Lúta", the Lakota name, as its primary name of business. This was announced as effective in 2023. The school's branding changed as a result.

== Curriculum ==
The school has Lakota language classes. The school began teaching the language in 1967.

== See also ==
- List of Jesuit sites
- Marquette University Special Collections and University Archives
- Oglala Lakota County School District
  - Lakota Tech High School
- Pine Ridge School - Bureau of Indian Education school
