= Wounded Knee Battlefield =

- Wounded Knee
- U.S. National Register of Historic Places
- U.S. National Historic Landmark
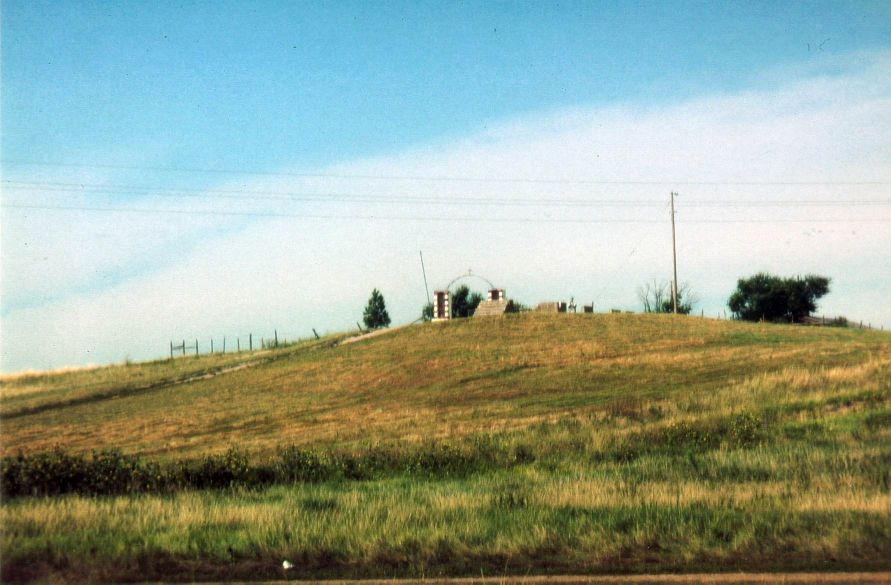

- Location within South Dakota Location within the United States
- Location: Pine Ridge Indian Reservation
- Nearest city: Batesland, South Dakota
- Coordinates: 43°8′33″N 102°21′54″W
- Area: 870 acres (350 ha)
- Built: 1890
- NRHP reference No.: 66000719

Significant dates
- Added to NRHP: October 15, 1966
- Designated NHL: December 21, 1965

The Wounded Knee Battlefield was the site of the Wounded Knee Massacre of 1890 in South Dakota, United States. An 870-acre (350 ha) area was designated a U.S. National Historic Landmark in 1965. Along with all other National Historic Landmarks, it was listed on the U.S. National Register of Historic Places when that program was inaugurated in 1966, listed as "Wounded Knee Battlefield". A museum at the site interprets the massacre.

The National Historic Landmark nomination was drafted by 1990 with a latter consultation with Indian representatives. Following the suggestion that the Indian representation should be increased, oral history interviews were conducted with four descendants. The interview summaries were included in the revised nomination.

The NRHP listing included one contributing site and one contributing object, and also 14 non-contributing buildings and 12 non-contributing sites. The non-contributing elements are fairly small and scattered so do not detract greatly from the setting. The contributing site is the area of the massacre itself, including the probable location of the post office and Mousseau's store. The contributing object is the 1903 monument. Non-contributing buildings include a log church built in 1975, a small frame dwelling, a concrete block visitors center from 1989, a log dwelling, a frame Church of God, a mobile home serving as that church's parsonage, three more frame buildings in the church complex, two other dwellings, and a concrete block building. Non-contributing sites include two cemeteries from the Catholic Church and from the Church of God, the Catholic Church foundation and basement from 1913 (burned in 1973), foundations and rubble of a 1930 store and gas station complex (burned in 1973), foundation of a concrete building, foundation of a metal building.

The National Historic Landmark program provides some monitoring. As of January 17, 2010, its webpage noted: "The area suffers from neglect." The program's recommendation (change since last report) was that "The owners need to provide regular maintenance at the site."

== See also ==
- List of National Historic Landmarks in South Dakota
- National Register of Historic Places listings in Oglala Lakota County, South Dakota
