= SuAnne Big Crow =

American basketball player (1974–1992)

- Born: March 15, 1974; Pine Ridge, South Dakota, U.S.
- Died: February 9, 1992 (aged 17)
- Citizenship: Oglala Lakota
- Known for: best high school female basketball player and championship in South Dakota in 1989

SuAnne Big Crow (March 15, 1974 – February 9, 1992) was an American basketball player for the 1989 South Dakota champion Pine Ridge High School team.

== Life ==
A member of the Oglala Lakota Oyate, she was born and raised on the Pine Ridge Indian Reservation in southwestern South Dakota, and died as a teenager in a car accident. SuAnne was featured in Ian Frazier's book On the Rez, and in 2022, a feature-length documentary about her life, titled Big Crow, was released in the United States.

Her basketball career was successful and dramatic: Big Crow made the last-second winning basket in the state Class A championship game. She was the best girl's player in South Dakota and scored an average of 39 points per game. Her 67 points in a single game was a state record. Big Crow died while traveling to accept a Miss Basketball Award during her senior year of high school.

== Legacy ==
The SuAnne Big Crow Boys and Girls Club was created in 1992 and was the first Boys and Girls Club built in Indian Country. The center was named for SuAnne, who had wished for a "Happy Town" for children in her community.

The Spirit of Su Award is given every year to an outstanding senior player who exemplifies the life of SuAnne Big Crow. The player is judged on outstanding athletic ability, leadership, character, sportsmanship and grade point average. The South Dakota High School Activities Association (SDHSAA) presents the award annually at each of the six boys’ and girls’ state basketball tournaments. The recipients receive an American Indian star quilt as part of the award presentation.

The National Education Association awards the SuAnne Big Crow Memorial Award to a K-12 student(s), under the age of 20, whose achievements in schools have helped enhance students’ sense of worthy and dignity. The nominee must promote, through leadership in specific activities and actions, an appreciation for diversity and the elimination of bigotry and prejudice; demonstrate leadership in improving the conditions and self-esteem of minorities or the disadvantaged; and secure community recognition for his or her contribution toward the elimination of social injustice.

Folk Singer John McCutcheon was inspired by a story of SuAnne's courage to record the song "SuAnne Big Crow" on his 2007 album "This Fire". The song tells a story about a night that Big Crow's high school basketball team played in Lead, South Dakota in front of a gym full of fans screaming mockery of the Native American team, the Lady Thorpes. According to the song, Big Crow startled them into silence by performing the Shawl Dance with her warm-up jacket and singing in Lakota in the middle of the court. Big Crow's teammate, Doni De Cory, states that in later years, the Lady Thorpes and the Lead women's basketball team got to know one another better: Big Crow had brought them together. However, some aspects of the event may be exaggerated.
