= National Register of Historic Places listings in Oglala Lakota County, South Dakota =

Location of Oglala Lakota County in South Dakota

This is a detailed table of the National Register of Historic Places listing in Oglala Lakota County, South Dakota.

This is intended to be a detailed table of the property on the National Register of Historic Places in Oglala Lakota County, South Dakota, United States. Latitude and longitude coordinates are provided for this property; they may be seen in a Google map.

There is 1 property listed on the National Register in the county. It is a National Historic Landmark.

This National Park Service list is complete through NPS recent listings posted July 10, 2026.

== Current listing ==
	Name on the Register	Image	Date listed	Location	City or town	Description
1	Wounded Knee National Historic Landmark	Wounded Knee National Historic Landmark	October 15, 1966 (#66000719)	11 miles west of Batesland on the Pine Ridge Indian Reservation; 43°08′33″N 102°21′54″W	Batesland	
