= Porcupine, South Dakota =

Porcupine, South Dakota Pȟahíŋ Siŋté
- CDP
- Location in Oglala Lakota County and the state of South Dakota
- Coordinates: 43°16′07″N 102°20′07″W
- Country: United States
- State: South Dakota
- County: Oglala Lakota

Area
  - Total: 9.59 sq mi (24.83 km^{2})
  - Land: 9.59 sq mi (24.83 km^{2})
  - Water: 0 sq mi (0.00 km^{2})
- Elevation: 3,288 ft (1,002 m)

Population (2020)
  - Total: 925
  - Density: 96.5/sq mi (37.25/km^{2})
- Time zone: UTC−7 (Mountain (MST))
  - Summer (DST): UTC−6 (MDT)
- ZIP code: 57772
- Area code: 605
- FIPS code: 46-51340
- GNIS feature ID: 2393194

Porcupine (Lakota: Pȟahíŋ Siŋté, 'porcupine tail') is a census-designated place (CDP) in Oglala Lakota County, South Dakota, United States. The population was 925 at the 2020 census.

The community most likely was named after Porcupine Butte. Porcupine has been noted for its unusual place name, and for its designation as the unofficial capital of the unrecognized Republic of Lakotah.

== Geography ==
According to the United States Census Bureau, the CDP has a total area of 9.5 square miles (24.6 km^{2}), all land.

== Culture ==
Porcupine is home to KILI (90.1 FM), a non-profit radio station broadcasting to the Lakota people on the Pine Ridge, Cheyenne River, and Rosebud Indian Reservations, part of the Great Sioux Nation. The station started broadcasting in 1983 as the first American Indian-owned radio station in the United States.

== Demographics ==
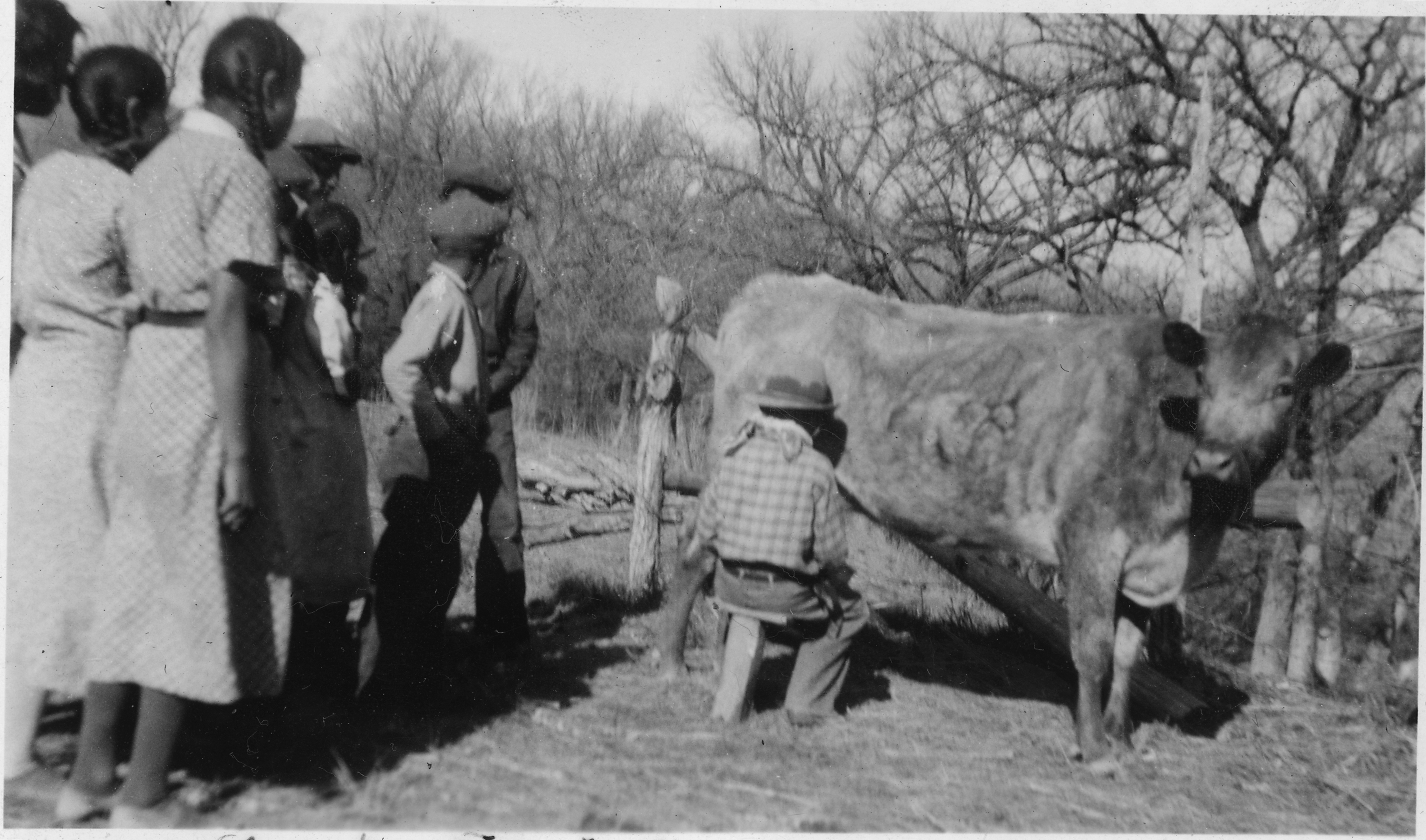
Students at Brave Heart Day School in Porcupine learn to milk a cow, Oct. 2, 1937

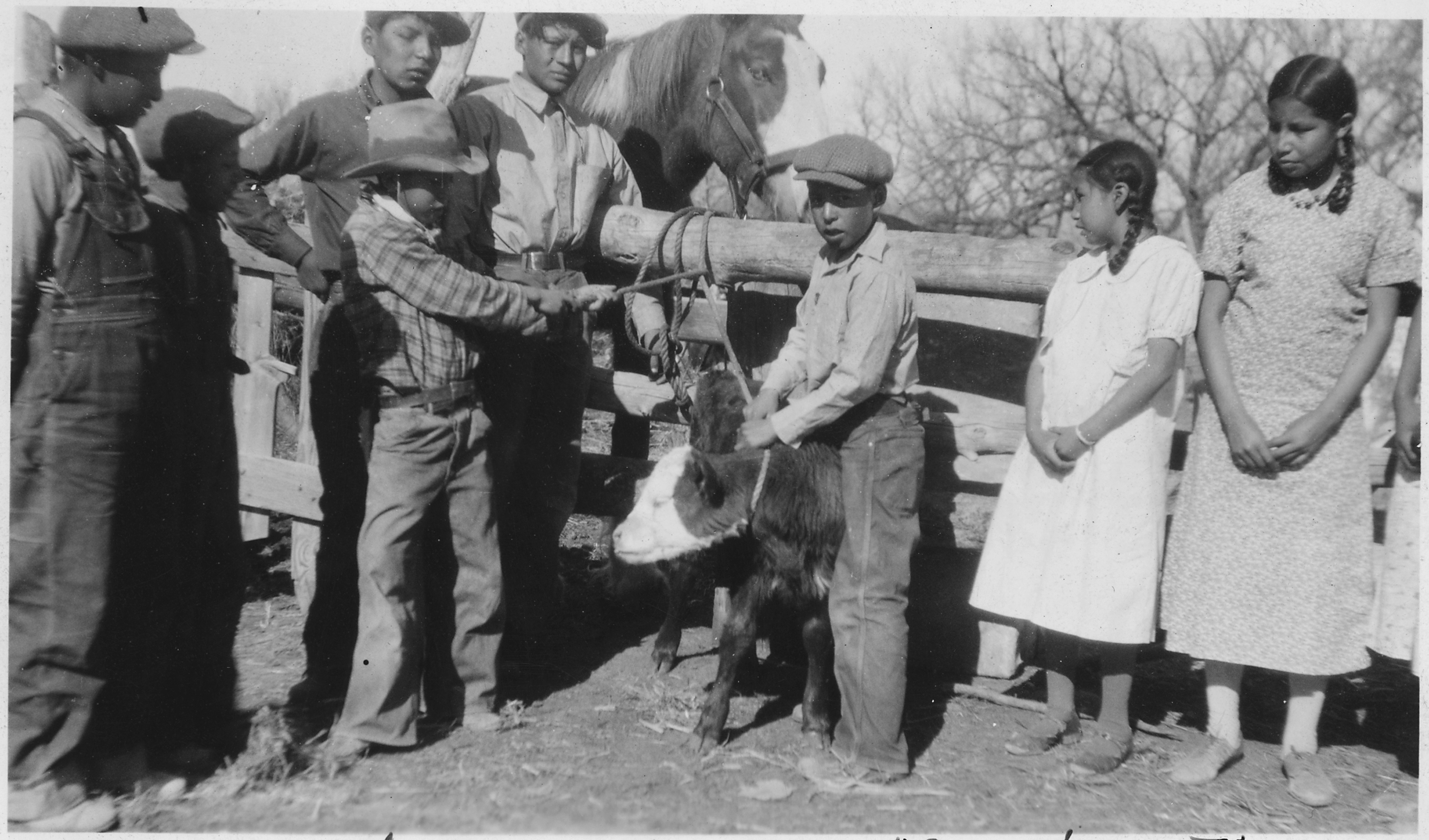
Students at Brave Heart Day School in Porcupine learn to brand a calf, Oct. 2, 1937

Historical population
Census	Pop.	Note	%±
1990	783		—
2000	407		−48.0%
2010	1,062		160.9%
2020	925		−12.9%
U.S. Decennial Census

As of the census of 2000, there were 407 people, 89 households, and 76 families residing in the CDP. The population density was 42.9 inhabitants per square mile (16.6/km^{2}). There were 103 housing units at an average density of 10.8 per square mile (4.2/km^{2}). The racial makeup of the CDP was 1.23% European American, 98.28% Native American, and 0.49% from two or more races. Hispanic or Latino of any race were 1.47% of the population.

There were 89 households, out of which 47.2% had children under the age of 18 living with them, 32.6% were married couples living together, 38.2% had a female householder with no husband present, and 13.5% were non-families. 9.0% of all households were made up of individuals, and 1.1% had someone living alone who was 65 years of age or older. The average household size was 4.57 and the average family size was 4.83.

In the CDP, the population was spread out, with 42.0% under the age of 18, 13.5% from 18 to 24, 21.6% from 25 to 44, 18.9% from 45 to 64, and 3.9% who were 65 years of age or older. The median age was 21 years. For every 100 females, there were 110.9 males. For every 100 females age 18 and over, there were 114.5 males.

The median income for a household in the CDP was $24,583, and the median income for a family was $26,667. Males had a median income of $26,786 versus $26,250 for females. The per capita income for the CDP was $4,429. About 30.8% of families and 28.8% of the population were below the poverty line, including 29.1% of those under age 18 and none of those age 65 or over.

== Radio station ==
KILI FM 90.1, is licensed to Porcupine. Broadcasting to the Lakota people on the Pine Ridge, Cheyenne River, and Rosebud Indian Reservations, part of the Great Sioux Nation. It started broadcasting in 1983 as the first American Indian-owned radio station in the United States. At the end of 2008, KILI announced on its website that the station would be powered by a wind turbine.

== Education ==
Oglala Lakota County School District is the public school district. Lakota Tech High School is the public high school.

A campus of Red Cloud Indian School, Our Lady of Lourdes Elementary School (Lakota: Wíŋyaŋ Wakȟáŋ Owáyawa), is adjacent to the Porcupine CDP and has a Porcupine address. It was established in 1929, and became a part of the Red Cloud System in 1931.

== Notable people ==
- Old Chief Smoke, an original Oglala Sioux head chief. He is buried southeast of Porcupine.
- Russell Means, an American Indian Movement activist and actor.
- Edgar Bear Runner - Citizen used by the FBI to negotiate with AIM occupiers during the Wounded Knee incident
