= Rainbow Girl (disambiguation) =

Rainbow Girl (Dori Aandraison of the planet Xolnar) is a fictional character and a DC Comics super heroine.

Rainbow Girl or The Rainbow Girl may also refer to:

- Rainbow Girl, an alternate codename for Marvel Comics superhero Julie Power
- Rainbow Girl, painting by Ian Scott (artist)
- "Rainbow Girl", song on 2009 album Butterflies and Elvis by Yohanna
- "Rainbow Girl", 1969 single by Bobby Lord
- "Rainbow Girl", musical work by S3RL
- "Rainbow Girl", track on 2007 album No Money! Still Be Happy! by Awaking (duo)
- The Rainbow Girl (film), 1917 silent film by Rollin S. Sturgeon
- The Rainbow Girl (musical), 1918 stage musical starring Beth Lydy

== See also ==
- International Order of the Rainbow for Girls, a Masonic youth service organization
- Rainbows (Girl Guides), the youngest section of GirlGuiding in the UK
