= Lakota High School =

Lakota High School may refer to the following schools in the United States:

- Lakota High School (West Chester, Ohio)
- Lakota High School (Kansas, Ohio)
- Lakota East High School, Middletown, Ohio
- Lakota West High School, West Chester, Ohio
- Lakota Tech High School, South Dakota

== See also ==
- Lakota Local School District (disambiguation)
