= Oglala Lakota County School District =

School district in South Dakota, United States

Oglala Lakota County School District 65-1 (OLCSD) is a public school district headquartered in the Batesland School in Batesland, South Dakota. It is in the Pine Ridge Indian Reservation.

It serves all of Oglala Lakota County.

It was formerly known as the Shannon County School District 65-1 (SCSD). It adopted its current name in 2016. The process to adopt the current name began on July 1, 2015.

== Curriculum ==
As of 2015 compared to the area Bureau of Indian Education (BIE) schools, OLCSD schools have less content geared towards Native American culture while they have more advanced technology than the BIE schools.

== Operations ==
In 2015, according to the editorial board of the Minneapolis Star-Tribune, the district had one school it deemed to be in need of replacing but that the other three were recently built. The editorial board wrote, "the gap in quality between the public school facilities and the four distressed BIE schools is a touchy subject on the reservation." As of that year schools were beyond capacity and had a total of 1,500 enrolled.

In 2018 the district created a school safety plan with its rural location in mind, as police response would not be at the level it would be in a suburban or urban area. Brandon Ecoffey of Lakota Times described the plan as "extremely aggressive, and somewhat controversial".

Previously the district did not operate a high school building and required high school students staying with the district to attend virtual school. The first physical high school, Lakota Tech High School, opened in 2020.

== Schools ==
High school:

- Lakota Tech High School (Pine Ridge)

K-8 schools:

- Batesland School (Batesland)
  - It opened in 1926 and its initial enrollment was below 20. By 2001 its enrollment was 210.
- Red Shirt School (Hermosa)
- Rockyford School (Porcupine)
- Wolf Creek School
  - By 2002 its enrollment was 550.

Other:

- OLCSD Virtual High School

== See also ==
- Pine Ridge School - Bureau of Indian Education school in Pine Ridge
