= Edgar Bear Runner =

Native American activist (1951–2021)

Edgar Bear Runner, Sr.
- Born: 28 May 1951; Porcupine, South Dakota, U.S.
- Died: 4 July 2021 (aged 70); Rapid City, South Dakota, U.S.
- Citizenship: American Indian
- Occupation: Activist
- Years active: 1973–2021
- Organization: American Indian Movement
- Known for: Negotiating with Jumping Bull ranch incident activists
- Parent(s): Grace Rock/ Lone Hill(mother); Oscar Bear Runner (father)
- Relatives: Lillian Bear Runner (sister)

Edgar Donroy Bear Runner (28 May 1951 – 4 July 2021) was a Native American activist. He is perhaps best known for attempting to peacefully negotiate the Jumping Bull ranch incident in 1975 via parleying with American Indian Movement activists.

== Early life ==
Edgar Bear Runner was born on 28 May 1951 in Porcupine, South Dakota, to mother Winnifred "Winni" Alice Janis and father Oscar Bear Runner. Edgar Bear Runner was a student at the University of Utah.

== Pine Ridge Reign of Terror ==
The Pine Ridge Reign of Terror is a label commonly assigned to the period of time in the late twentieth century following the Wounded Knee incident, in which violence was perpetrated against AIM followers and Native American citizens in general on the Pine Ridge Indian Reservation. During this period, the FBI carried out intensive local surveillance, repeated arrests, harassment and bad faith legal proceedings against AIM leaders and supporters. During this "Reign of Terror," three hundred Native Americans were harassed, beaten, abused and at least sixty-four Native Americans were murdered (almost all of whom were directly affiliated with or were allies of AIM from the Lakota Nation).

Bear Runner was in his early 20s during Wounded Knee and the reign of terror, of which he said, "Our elders, our parents and grandparents in our community had called on this family, known to us as the American Indian Movement. The American Indian Movement was invited by the traditional community from the Pine Ridge Indian Reservation to provide aid, to provide a sense of security for people who felt that the law had abandoned them. People felt a sense of security when the American Indian Movement arrived on the Pine Ridge Indian Reservation. There was not only a sense of security, there was also a sense of Lakota-ism. There was a sense of aspiration of pride, of being who we really are. After all, it's beautiful to be Lakota. These were the feelings among the young people."

=== Jumping Bull ranch shootout ===
The FBI conducted a "probe" of what AIM demands were by having Bear Runner discuss these issues in-depth with them. He entered the compound with his hands raised in order to keep from being gunned down by an FBI sniper. When Bear Runner returned to Highway 18 about thirty minutes later, he informed BIA superintendent Kendall Cummings that both agents appeared to be dead, and the Jumping Bull property was seemingly deserted. Bear Runner and Cummings were then "allowed" to walk back in, with both sets of their hands raised above their heads, in order to verify that the agents were no longer alive.

Pertaining to the 26 June 1975 shootout, Edgar Bear Runner was listed as one of forty-eight of the original suspects.

On the week of 10 November 1975, two years after the occupation of Wounded Knee, Bear Runner was the victim of an attempt on his life. Edgar Bear Runner was attacked in the Sioux Nation Supermarket by Manny Wilson (son of corrupt Oglala Lakota Sioux tribal chairman Lakota Sioux of the Pine Ridge Indian Reservation, Richard Wilson) and two other GOON's who then fled the scene when the manager called the police.

== Activism ==
Bear Runner was named as a defendant in the court cases South Dakota vs. Edgar Bear Runner and Ted Means as well as a defendant in Nebraska vs. Edgar Bear Runner and Leon Adams, March 1976. Bear Runner had been arrested, along with several other spectators, for "rioting to obstruct justice", following his participation in Custer, South Dakota, protests on 6 February 1973 concerning the murder of Wesley Bad Heart Bull. In the PBS documentary, We Shall Remain, Bear Runner was quoted as saying of the Custer House incident, "I was right on the steps, you know, and things were happening. We bloodied the guy; we took the helmet away. We blooded him up. Then I ran across to help get gas in the filling station. We were filling up and making Molotov cocktails and busting the bottles on the building, and the fires started on the wall and everything." Bear Runner would later be acquitted by a jury.

Bear Runner was also one of several plaintiffs who filed a lawsuit in an attempt to recover damages caused by the deployment and utilization of Army and Air Force personnel for law-enforcement purposes pursuant to a conspiracy by appellees. In Case No. 84-2617, Gladys BISSONETTE, Ellen Moves Camp, Eugene White Hawk, Marvin Ghost Bear, Edgar Bear Runner, Oscar Bear Runner, Severt Young Bear, Rachel White Dress, Helen Red Feather, Eddie White Dress, Vicki Little Moon, Madonna Gilbert, Lorelei Means, and Carla Blakey, Appellants, v. Alexander HAIG, Richard G. Kleindienst, Joseph T. Sneed, Charles D. Ablard, Joseph H. Trimbach, Ralph E. Erickson, Harlington Wood, Jr., Kenneth Belieu, Rolland Gleszer, Edmund Edwards, John Hay, and Volney F. Warner, Appellees, on 16 September 1986, the United States Court of Appeals for the Eighth Circuit dismissed the case set forth by the plaintiffs on the basis of Qualified immunity.

Bear Runner has organized memorials and erected headstones for Anna Mae Pictou Aquash and Joseph "Killsright" Bedell Stuntz, in order to honor their contributions and observe the sacrifices they made.

In regards to the U.S. Supreme Court ruling decision which outlined how the government violated its 1868 treaty with the Sioux when the country took possession of the Black Hills and the subsequent monetary settlement which has not been accepted in the present day, Bear Runner, as a tribal historic preservation officer, explained his position: "We will never accept the money. We're the poorest of the poor tribes. But we will never accept that money. We want our land back."

Bear Runner remains a fierce proponent of Leonard Peltier's innocence. In 1999, Bear Runner issued a statement at a rally on behalf of the people from Pine Ridge rally to free Peltier, "Because of Leonard's known advocacy and support for human rights, indigenous sovereignty, justice and resistance against total U.S. colonization of indigenous peoples of America he certainly was punished for it and continues to suffer today at the hands of ongoing U.S. oppression. His 1976 federal conviction and 200-year sentence speaks for itself. Anybody who stands up for their rights can face the risk of also being framed and imprisoned like Leonard Peltier. The FBI willfully, knowingly and unconditionally committed acts of aggression, governmental misconduct, crimes against humanity, peace and the dignity of mankind, fabrication of a felony extradition, perjury against traditional oriented individuals and activists from the Oglala Lakota Nation." That same year, when then-president Bill Clinton visited the Pine Ridge Indian Reservation on 8 July 1999, Bear Runner held up a sign to urge President Clinton to grant clemency to Peltier, who is serving a life term for killing two FBI agents. Bear Runner has also provided testimony at Leonard Peltier's 1976 Extradition Hearing in British Columbia. Bear Runner also headlines events which are geared toward having clemency granted to Peltier.

He died in Rapid City, South Dakota, in July 2021, at the age of 70.

== Filmography ==
Film
Year	Film	Role	Notes
1994	Lakota Woman: Siege at Wounded Knee	Reasonable Man	
Television
Year	Title	Role	Notes

== See also ==
- American Indian Movement
- Wesley Bad Heart Bull
- Wounded Knee incident
- Anna Mae Pictou-Aquash
- Leonard Peltier
