= Big Crow =

2022 film directed by Kris Kaczor

- Theatrical Poster
- Directed by: Kris Kaczor
- Written by: Inila Wakan
- Produced by: Kevin Bayson
- Cinematography: Matt Lyons
- Edited by: Steve Nemsick
- Music by: Kris Kaczor
- Release date: March 4, 2022 (Santa Barbara International Film Festival)
- Running time: 69 minutes
- Country: United States
- Language: English

Big Crow is a 2022 American documentary film directed by Kris Kaczor. The film examines the life and impact of SuAnne Big Crow, a young Lakota basketball player who used her talents to fight racism, violence, drugs and alcohol on Pine Ridge Indian Reservation in South Dakota. In 1989 Suanne made history, bringing the first-ever class A girls state basketball championship to a native high school. Her tragic death in a car accident in 1992 served to cement her legacy as an activist and gave power to a voice that remains effective today, thirty years after her death.

== Cast ==
- SuAnne Big Crow
- Leticia “Chick” Big Crow
- Cecelia “CeCe” Big Crow
- Frances “Pigeon” Big Crow
- Kellee Brewer
- Angie Big Crow
- Toni Morton
- Rayette Provost
- Bryan Brewer
- Bamm Brewer
- Raymond Eagle Hawk Jr.

== Release ==
Big Crow had its premiere at the Santa Barbara International Film Festival in 2022.
