= Pine Ridge, South Dakota =

Pine Ridge Wazíbló (Lakota)
- Census-designated place
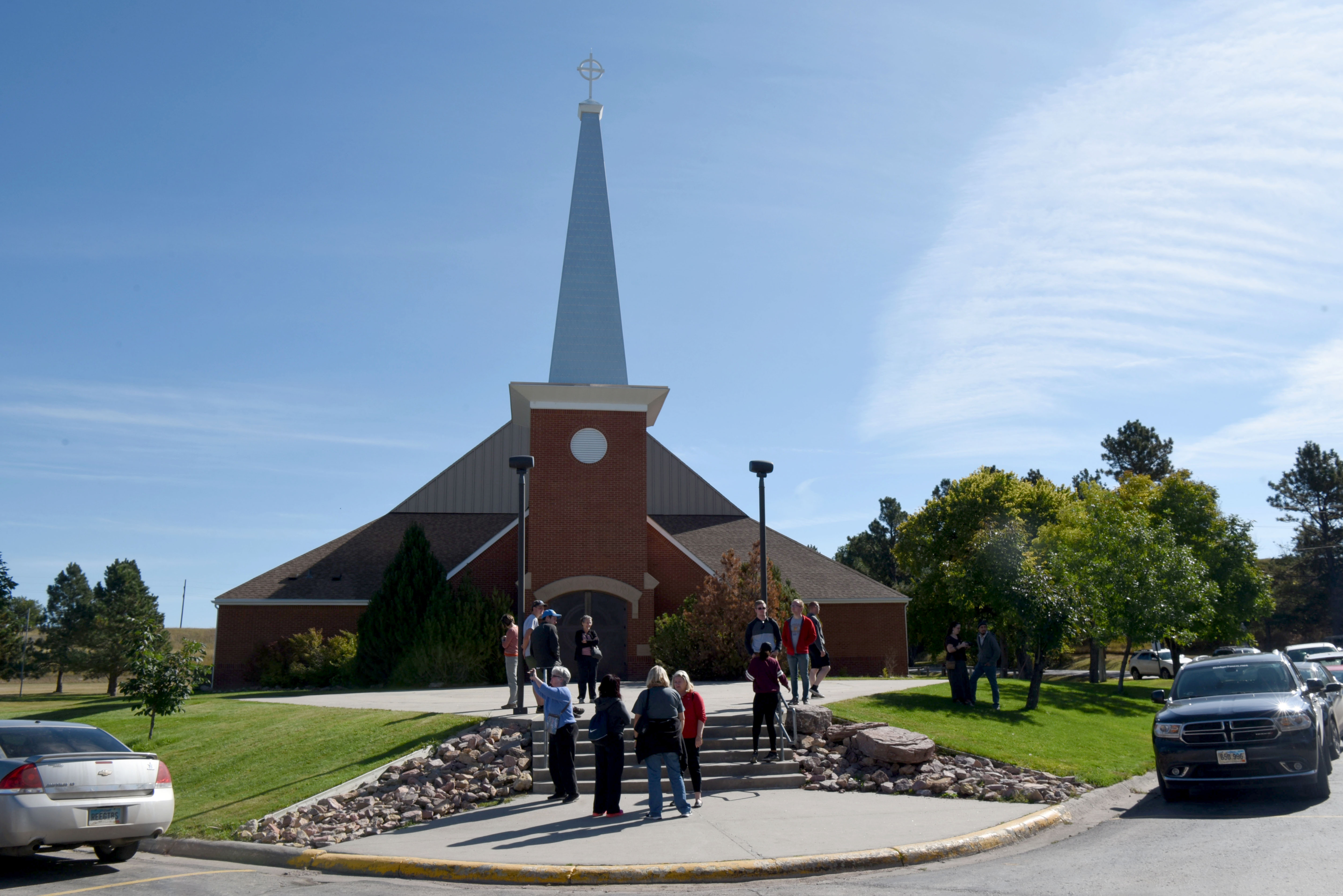
- Holy Rosary Catholic Church at Red Cloud Indian School

- Location of Pine Ridge within South Dakota. Pine Ridge (the United States)
- Coordinates: 43°01′37″N 102°33′08″W
- Country: United States
- State: South Dakota
- County: Oglala Lakota

Area
  - Total: 2.83 sq mi (7.32 km^{2})
  - Land: 2.83 sq mi (7.32 km^{2})
  - Water: 0 sq mi (0.00 km^{2})
- Elevation: 3,238 ft (987 m)

Population (2020)
  - Total: 3,138
  - Density: 1,109.8/sq mi (428.51/km^{2})
- Time zone: UTC−7 (Mountain (MST))
  - Summer (DST): UTC−6 (MDT)
- ZIP code: 57770
- Area code: 605
- FIPS code: 46-49660
- GNIS feature ID: 2393187

Pine Ridge (Lakota: Wazíbló) is a census-designated place (CDP) and the most populous community in Oglala Lakota County, South Dakota, United States. The population was 3,138 at the 2020 census. It is the tribal headquarters of the Oglala Sioux Tribe on the Pine Ridge Indian Reservation.

== History ==
The community was named for the pine trees on the ridge surrounding the town site. An early variant name was Pine Ridge Agency.

The Pine Ridge reservation was the location of a violent shootout between the FBI and American Indian Movement members in 1975. FBI agents Jack Coler and Ronald Williams were killed in the initial firefight, while activist native Joe Stuntz was later shot by a police sniper. Native activist Leonard Peltier was later convicted of the murder of the agents and sentenced to life in prison, but there has been debate around his innocence.

== Geography ==
According to the United States Census Bureau, the CDP has a total area of 3.2 square miles (8.2 km^{2}), of which 3.1 square miles (7.9 km^{2}) is land and 0.1 square mile (0.2 km^{2}) (2.54%) is water.

== Demographics ==
Historical population
Census	Pop.	Note	%±
1960	1,256		—
1970	2,768		120.4%
1980	3,059		10.5%
1990	2,596		−15.1%
2000	3,171		22.1%
2010	3,308		4.3%
2020	3,138		−5.1%
U.S. Decennial Census

=== 2020 census ===
As of the 2020 census, Pine Ridge had a population of 3,138 people, with 755 households and 564 families. The population density was 1,106.1 per square mile (427.1/km^{2}), and there were 821 housing units at an average density of 289.4 per square mile (111.7/km^{2}).

The median age was 27.1 years. 36.6% of residents were under age 18, 10.7% were from 18 to 24, 23.9% were from 25 to 44, 20.3% were from 45 to 64, and 8.5% were 65 years of age or older. For every 100 females, there were 104.6 males, and for every 100 females age 18 and over, there were 95.8 males age 18 and over.

Of the 755 households, 53.9% had children under the age of 18 living in them. Of all households, 19.3% were married-couple households, 25.6% were households with a male householder and no spouse or partner present, and 46.1% were households with a female householder and no spouse or partner present. About 21.2% of all households were made up of individuals and 6.0% had someone living alone who was 65 years of age or older. The average household size was 5.3 and the average family size was 5.7.

There were 821 housing units, of which 8.0% were vacant. The homeowner vacancy rate was 0.3% and the rental vacancy rate was 2.9%. 0.0% of residents lived in urban areas, while 100.0% lived in rural areas.

Racial composition as of the 2020 census
Race	Number	Percent
White	73	2.3%
Black or African American	2	0.1%
American Indian and Alaska Native	3,001	95.6%
Asian	4	0.1%
Native Hawaiian and Other Pacific Islander	0	0.0%
Some other race	14	0.4%
Two or more races	44	1.4%
Hispanic or Latino (of any race)	83	2.6%

The non-Hispanic White population was 2.2% as of the 2020 census.

=== Education ===
The percent of those with a bachelor’s degree or higher was estimated to be 3.9% of the population in the 2016–2020 5-year American Community Survey.

=== Income and poverty ===
The 2016–2020 5-year American Community Survey estimates show that the median household income was $37,198 (with a margin of error of +/- $14,292) and the median family income was $43,426 (+/- $17,824). Males had a median income of $28,138 (+/- $11,572) versus $17,463 (+/- $6,072) for females. The median income for those above 16 years old was $20,509 (+/- $7,510). Approximately, 33.8% of families and 41.1% of the population were below the poverty line, including 38.7% of those under the age of 18 and 18.2% of those ages 65 or over.

=== 2000 census ===
As of the census of 2000, there were 3,171 people, 688 households, and 593 families living in the CDP. The population density was 1,035.4 inhabitants per square mile (399.8/km^{2}). There were 742 housing units at an average density of 242.3 per square mile (93.6/km^{2}). The racial makeup of the CDP was 94.20% Native American, 3.72% White, 0.09% African American, 0.03% Asian, 0.09% Pacific Islander, 0.50% from other races, and 1.36% from two or more races. Hispanic or Latino of any race were 1.80% of the population.

There were 688 households, out of which 53.9% had children under the age of 18 living with them, 32.1% were married couples living together, 40.7% had a female householder with no husband present, and 13.8% were non-families. 10.9% of all households were made up of individuals, and 2.2% had someone living alone who was 65 years of age or older. The average household size was 4.40 and the average family size was 4.63.

In the CDP, the population was spread out, with 46.9% under the age of 18, 11.0% from 18 to 24, 26.1% from 25 to 44, 12.4% from 45 to 64, and 3.6% who were 65 years of age or older. The median age was 20 years. For every 100 females, there were 100.2 males. For every 100 females aged 18 and over, there were 89.8 males.

The median income for a household in the CDP was $21,089, and the median income for a family was $20,170. Males had a median income of $26,875 versus $25,516 for females. The per capita income for the CDP was $6,067. About 49.2% of families and 61.0% of the population were below the poverty line, including 74.6% of those under age 18 and 18.8% of those age 65 or over.

== Education ==
The area school district is Oglala Lakota County School District. Lakota Tech High School is the public high school.

There is a Bureau of Indian Education (BIE) school, Pine Ridge School.

Red Cloud Indian School is a private K-12 Catholic school in the area.

== Notable people ==
- SuAnne Big Crow, high school basketball star, leader of state championship team
- William "Hawk" Birdshead, philanthropist, suicide prevention, award winning filmmaker
- Beth Lydy, actress and singer on Broadway in 1910s
- Russell Means (1939–2012), American Indian Movement leader, activist and actor
- Billy Mills, born here, won the 10,000 meter gold medal at the 1964 Olympics
- Peri Pourier, member of the South Dakota House of Representatives
- Bobby Robertson, NFL Player

== See also ==
- List of census-designated places in South Dakota
