= Rockyford, South Dakota =

Unincorporated community in the US

Coordinates: 43°29′50″N 102°30′08″W

Rockyford (Lakota: Makȟóšiča or Iȟ'é Oíyuweǧe) is an unincorporated community in Oglala Lakota County, in the U.S. state of South Dakota. It is on the Pine Ridge Indian Reservation.

== History ==
A post office called Rockyford was established in 1923, and remained in operation until 1958. The community was named for a rocky ford on the river near the town site.
