= KILI =

Lakota radio station in Porcupine, South Dakota

- Porcupine, South Dakota; United States
- Frequency: 90.1 MHz

Programming
- Languages: Lakota, English
- Format: Community Radio
- Affiliations: Native Voice One

Ownership
- Owner: Lakota Communications, Inc.

History
- First air date: 1983
- Call sign meaning: "Cool" in the Lakota language

Technical information
- Licensing authority: FCC
- Facility ID: 36443
- Class: C1
- ERP: 100,000 watts
- HAAT: 155 m (509 ft)
- Transmitter coordinates: 43°10′48″N 102°19′25″W
- Translator: 88.7 K204FB (Rapid City)

Links
- Public license information: Public file; LMS
- Webcast: 32 kbit/s (live)
- Website: https://www.kiliradio.live/

KILI (90.1 FM), licensed to Porcupine, South Dakota, is a non-profit radio station broadcasting to the Lakota people on the Pine Ridge, Cheyenne River, and Rosebud Indian Reservations, part of the Great Sioux Nation.

Owned and operated by Lakota Communications, KILI serves 30,000 people on the three reservations, along with the large American Indian urban community in Rapid City, using a translator in the Mount Rushmore State's second-largest city. It seeks to preserve Native American culture and instill pride in the peoples' unique heritage.

Broadcast translator for KILI
| Call sign | Frequency | City of license | FID | ERP (W) | Class | FCC info |
|---|---|---|---|---|---|---|
| K204FB | (88.7 MHz) FM | Rapid City, South Dakota | 122161 | 34 | D | LMS |

== History ==
The station was founded in 1983 by members of the American Indian Movement, "the very first Indian-controlled, Indian-owned and Indian-run radio station in the U.S.," said activist Russell Means in 2006.

In mid-2006, the station was off the air for several weeks when its transmitter was hit by lightning on April 15, sustaining more than $200,000 in damage.

As a non-profit endeavor, KILI is supported by public grants and tribal government funding. It is governed by a board of directors composed of community leaders, such as Nellie Two Bulls. Known as "Grandma Nellie", she was active at the local and national level as a strong proponent of the Lakota culture, beloved as a storyteller and singer prior to her death on February 18, 2007 at age 81.

On December 29, 2008; KILI announced on its website that the station will be powered by a wind turbine.

== Programming ==
KILI broadcasts 22 hours daily in the Lakota language, as well as in English, from its studios on the Pine Ridge Reservation. Programs include: Morning Wakalyapi Show, an all-Lakota-language show by Francis Thunder Hawk, News of the Lakota Nation, live American Indian music performances in the evening, and frequent public service announcements.

One of its popular programs is the Blues Disc Jockey, hosted by Bryant High Horse on Sunday mornings. A Rapid City middle school teacher and guidance counselor during the week, he mixes blues tunes with humor on the air. High Horse, whose Lakota name is "Oyate Nawicajin" (meaning "Stand for his People"), is one of a group striving to preserve the Lakota language so that Lakota youth may speak and write their native language fluently. KILI's schedule includes daily instruction in the Lakota language.

The station also simulcasts live on the internet and hosts a daily national call-in show on American Indian issues, entitled Native America Calling.
