= Camp Lakota =

Camp Lakota may refer to:

- Camp Lakota (California)
- Camp Lakota (Illinois)
- Camp Lakota (Iowa)
- Camp Lakota (New York)
- Camp Lakota (Ohio)
- Camp Lakota (Wisconsin)
