= Republic of Lakotah proposal =

Proposal of legal withdrawal from the US

Republic of Lakotah
- Flag

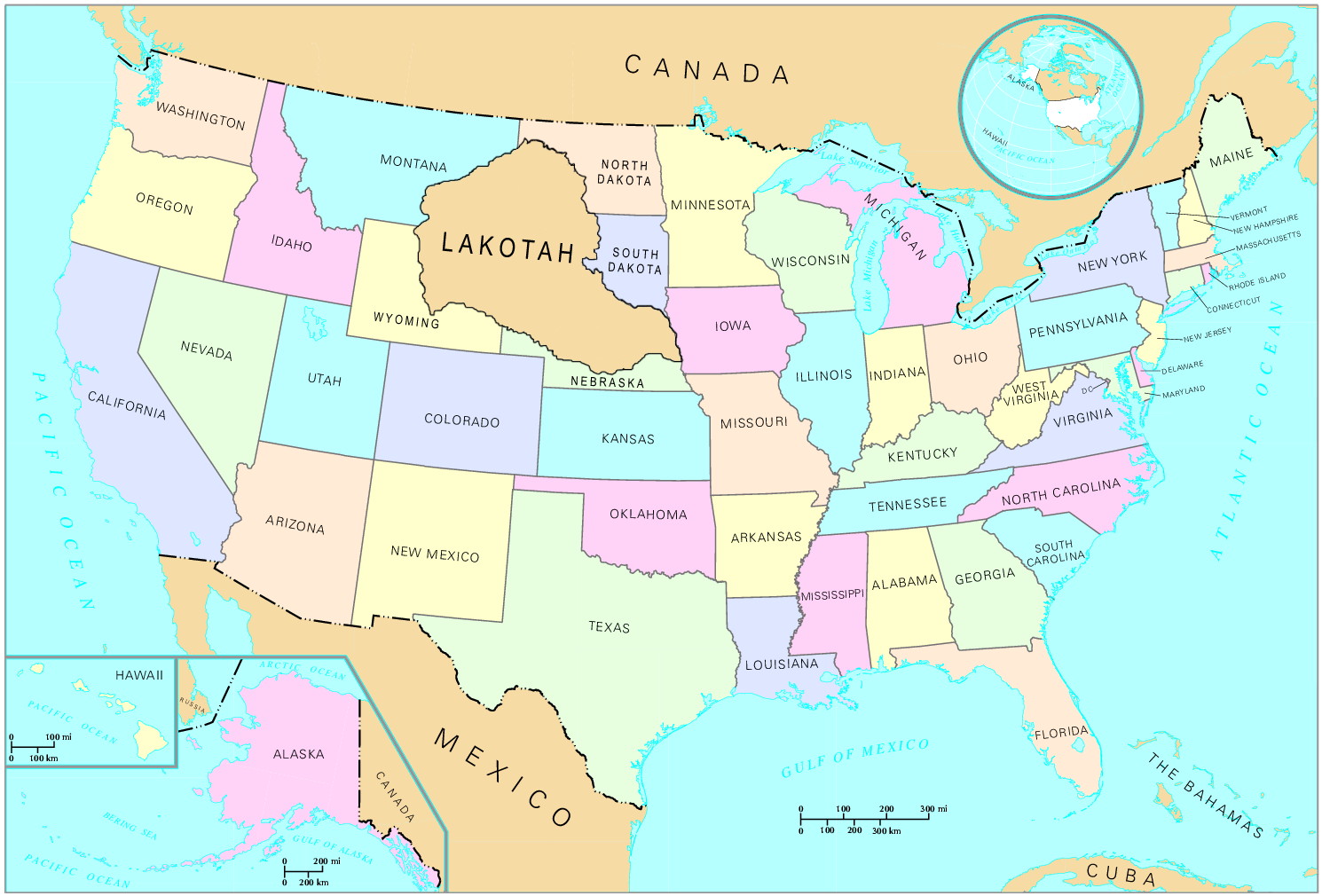
- Map of North America with the proposed Republic of Lakotah
- Status: Proposed
- Location: United States
- Capital: Porcupine
- Official languages: Lakota; English
- Ethnic groups: Lakota people
- Religion: Lakota religion
- Government: Proposed independent republic

Establishment
  - Declared: December 17, 2007

Area
  - Total: 199,998 km^{2} (77,220 sq mi)

The Republic of Lakotah or Lakotah is a proposed independent republic in North America for the Lakota people. The idea of an independent nation of the Lakota was advanced in 2007 by activist Russell Means and the Lakota Freedom Movement. The suggested territory would be an enclave within the borders of the United States, covering thousands of square miles in North Dakota, South Dakota, Nebraska, Wyoming, and Montana. The proposed national borders are those laid out in the 1851 Treaty of Fort Laramie between the United States government and the Lakota tribes. These lands are now occupied by Indian reservations and non-Native settlements.

None of the existing, recognized, Lakota tribal governments support the proposed republic, and were not consulted about the proposal.

== Background ==
The group espouses principles aligned with that of the global Land Back movements, and has stated several reasons for its assertion of sovereignty, all a result of what they refer to as the "colonial apartheid" of the reservation system in the United States. The group claims that control by the United States has led to massive unemployment, poverty, and disease among the Lakota peoples and alleges that 150 years of U.S. administration is responsible for the statistical poverty of Lakota lands. The group claims that withdrawal from the United States will reverse these problems, and help re-establish the Lakota language and culture. The group claims there have been persistent violations by the United States of their treaties with the Lakota.

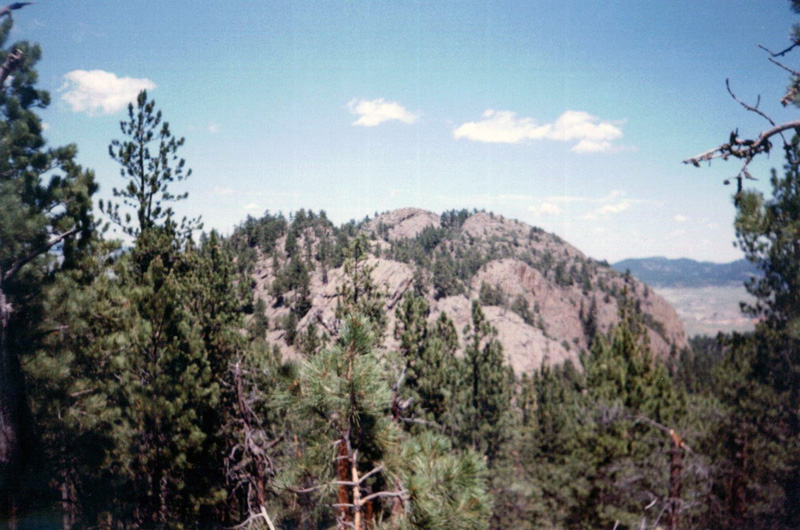
Inyan Kara—in the Black Hills—a sacred mountain to the Lakota

Another longstanding point of contention between the Lakota and the United States is the status of the Black Hills of South Dakota, which were part of Siouxland until they were taken—without compensation—by the U.S. government and opened for gold mining following the collapse of the Treaty of Fort Laramie (1868). In 1980, the U.S. Supreme Court decision United States v. Sioux Nation of Indians awarded $105 million to eight tribes of Sioux Indians as compensation ($17.1 million for the market value of the land in 1877 and $88 million in 5% per annum simple interest between 1877 and 1980), but the court did not award land. The tribal governments of the Lakota have refused the settlement.

== Politics and government ==
=== Assertion of independence ===
Four activists, calling themselves the Lakota Freedom Delegation, traveled to Washington, D.C., and contacted the State Department, on December 17, 2007. Their leader was Russell Means, who had been a prominent member of the American Indian Movement (AIM) since the late 1960s. Means identified himself as 'chief facilitator' of the provisional government of the Republic of Lakotah. Other members of the delegation included: Tegheya Kte, (also known as Garry Rowland), 'facilitator'; Duane "Canupa Gluha Mani" Martin, 'provisional government member'; and Phyllis Young, 'provisional government member'. The delegation members identified themselves by the title of "Itacan of Lakota" in a contemporaneous press release.

The delegation delivered a statement declaring that the Lakota were unilaterally withdrawing from several treaties that their ancestors had signed with the U.S.; and that they were setting up their own independent nation. They identified themselves as members of the 'provisional government of Lakotah.' The document further declared the Lakota to be "...'predecessor sovereign' of Dakota Territory..." and cited gross violations of the treaties between the Lakota and the United States as the immediate cause for withdrawal. Other reasons cited included that "...[the federal government] has failed to abide by 33 tenets that promised land, health care, education and other services." The letter invited the United States government to enter into negotiations with the newly declared "Lakotah". It threatened that if good-faith negotiations were not begun, then "Lakotah" would begin to administer liens against real estate transactions within the claimed five state area of Lakotah." The Lakota Freedom Delegation also stated that they did not recognize the tribal governments or tribal presidents as were recognized by the United States Bureau of Indian Affairs. They referred to these groups as "stay-by-the-fort Indians".

The Lakota Freedom Movement founders cited their motivation for founding the group can be found in the Oglala 1974 Declaration of Continuing Independence:

The United States of America has continually violated the independent Native Peoples of this continent by Executive action, Legislative fiat and Judicial decision. By its actions, the U.S. has denied all Native people their International Treaty rights, Treaty lands and basic human rights of freedom and sovereignty. This same U.S. Government, which fought to throw off the yoke of oppression and gain its own independence, has now reversed its role and become the oppressor of sovereign Native people.

In a news release on January 15, 2008, the Republic of Lakotah proposed that independence from the United States might follow a Compact of Free Association, and suggested that the independence process could resemble that of the Philippines, Palau, the Federated States of Micronesia, or the Marshall Islands.

=== Proposed boundaries ===
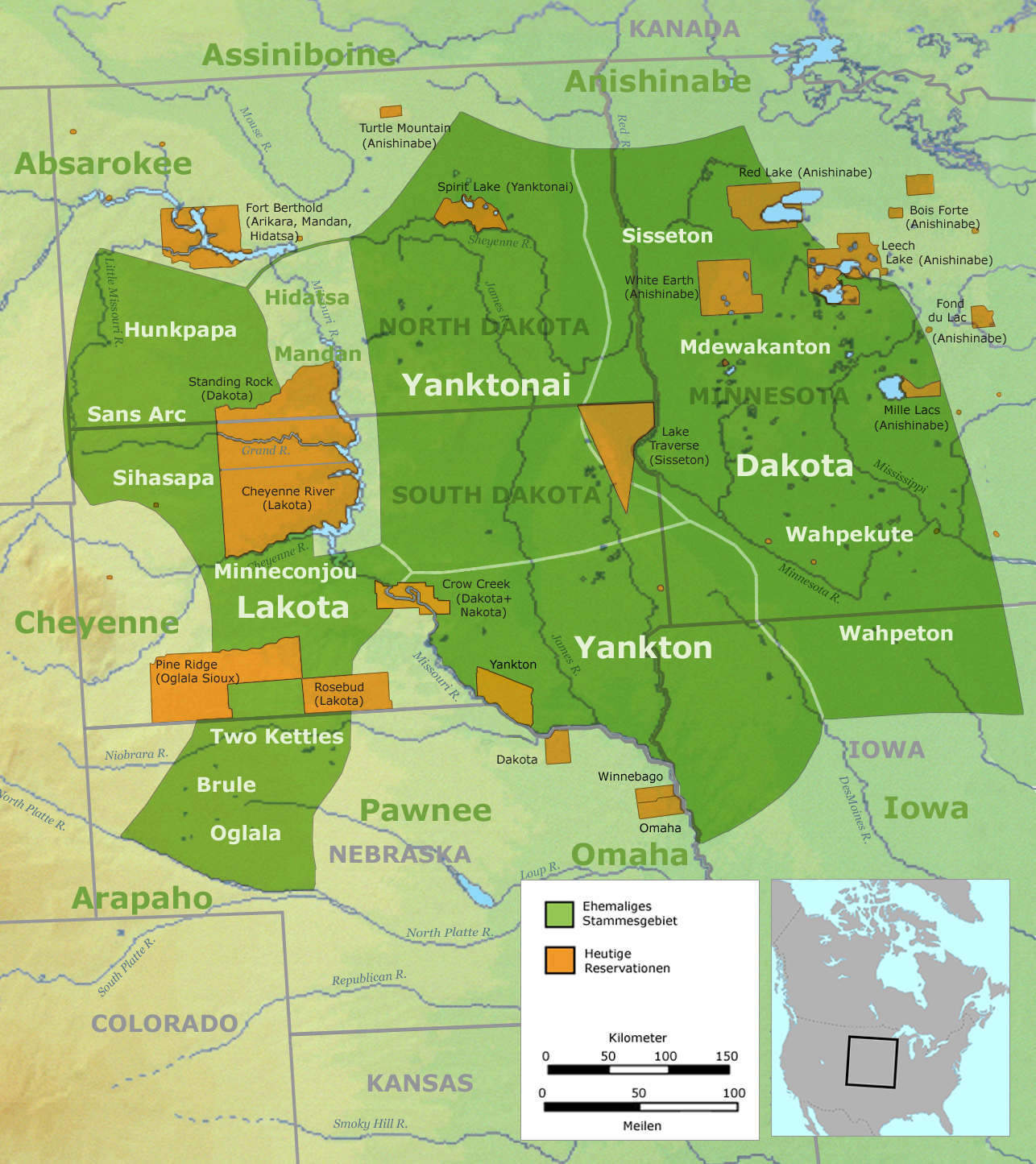
Traditional range of the Siouan peoples (dark green) and the current reservations (orange)

The proposed boundaries of Lakotah would be the Yellowstone River to the north, the North Platte River to the south, the Missouri River to the east and an irregular line marking the west. These borders coincide with those set by the 1851 Treaty of Fort Laramie. (Note: The territory of the Sioux or Dahcotah Nation, commencing [at] the mouth of the White Earth River, on the Missouri River; thence in a southwesterly direction to the forks of the Platte River; thence up the north fork of the Platte River to a point known as the Red Buts, or where the road leaves the river; thence along the range of mountains known as the Black Hills, to the head-waters of Heart River; thence down Heart River to its mouth; and thence down the Missouri River to the place of beginning.) The Republic of Lakotah announced its provisional capital as Porcupine, South Dakota, with hopes in the long run to move the administration closer to Rapid City, South Dakota.

=== Proposed governmental structure ===
Citizenship in the proposed republic would be open to people of all races and to any resident of the land Lakotah claims. The group said they planned to issue their own passports and driver licenses in the name of the proposed nation. The group proposed that the nation be organized as a confederation that would respect the libertarian principles of posse comitatus and caveat emptor; would offer "individual liberty through community rule"; and would collect no nationwide taxes. Individual communities within the proposed nation, however, would be allowed to levy taxes with the consent of the taxed. Means suggested that the proposed nation should not use fiat currency but instead adopt a gold standard. Means stated that this system of government is derived from the traditional Lakota government system, saying, "...we are going to implement how we lived prior to the Invasion. Each community will be a mini-state unto itself... They will form the federation known as Lakotah." Leaders of communities would be informally chosen by elders of the community.

On January 1, 2008, the republic announced that it would begin to file the liens on all U.S. government-held lands within their claimed borders; however, the first round of liens, in an unnamed county in South Dakota, were rejected. In July 2008, Means announced that the Republic of Lakotah would be creating an all-Lakota "grand jury" to investigate corruption by U.S. government officials on the seven reservations in the republic's claimed territory. In early 2008, Means stated that he intended to treat the result of the upcoming 2008 Pine Ridge Reservation presidential election, in which he was a candidate, as a "plebiscite/referendum" on Lakota independence. He lost that election 1,918 to 2,277.

== Legal basis for independence ==
Supporters of Lakotah argue that their assertion of sovereignty is entirely legal under "natural, international and United States law". The group emphasizes that the Republic's establishment comes from a withdrawal from the United States, not a secession. They claim the right to withdraw, on behalf of the Lakota people, from the Treaties of Fort Laramie as a consequence of the Vienna Convention on the Law of Treaties and the Declaration on the Rights of Indigenous Peoples. Members argue that the decision in the case of Lone Wolf v. Hitchcock, 187 U.S. 553 (1903) shows that the United States Government does not adequately protect Indian rights. Means cited the Enabling Act of 1889, that contained clauses protecting Indian sovereignty on the lands comprising the states where the Lakota historically reside and have been ignored.

=== International contacts ===
The group has pursued international recognition for Lakotah at several embassies, including those of Venezuela, Bolivia, Chile, and South Africa. In February 2008, the Lakotah Freedom Delegation handed over a formal petition, asking for recognition of the Republic of Lakotah, to the embassies of Russia, Serbia, Bolivia, Venezuela, the Republic of South Africa, Ireland, France, Nicaragua, East Timor, Chile, Turkey, India, Finland, Iceland and Uruguay. (Note: The text of the petition is available online.)

== Reactions ==
Means and Mani made the controversial claim that some 13,000 Lakota (77% of the population of the Pine Ridge Indian Reservation), have shown support for the Republic of Lakotah, and that the eight-member delegation that traveled to Washington, D.C., was only a portion of some 77 tribal elders and activists taking part in the movement.

=== Federal government ===
The United States Department of State referred queries on the subject of Lakotah to the United States Department of the Interior, which oversees the Bureau of Indian Affairs. Gary Garrison of the BIA said that the group's withdrawal "doesn't mean anything". He went on to say, "These are not legitimate tribal governments elected by the people ... when they begin the process of violating other people's rights, breaking the law, they're going to end up like all the other groups that have declared themselves independent—usually getting arrested and being put in jail."

Regarding the government response, or lack thereof, Russell Means stated that, "I don't expect the federal government to do anything. I don't believe they even know what to do."

=== Lakota tribes ===
Contrary to Means' claims, none of the existing Lakota tribal governments supported the proposed republic, and they were not consulted about the proposal. Rapid City Journal reporter Bill Harlan reported on his blog that "...most folks I talk to hadn't heard about the declaration. The ones who had heard the news, to a person, did not want to talk about it on the record." The Journal noted that "...there were no tribal presidents in the group which made the announcement, no one from the top ranks of any of the Lakota Sioux tribes..." Nanwica Kciji, an Oglala Lakota and first president of the Native American Journalists Association, has discredited the December 2007 developments, arguing that the Lakotah Freedom Delegation "never considered that treaties are made between nations and not individuals." According to scholar Hiroshi Fukurai, "...the declaration of independence by the Republic of Lakotah in 2007 has been largely ignored by the US, as well as by the UN and its Member States."

=== Other tribal governments and domestic groups ===
Rodney Bordeaux, chairman of the Rosebud Sioux, said that Rosebud Indian Reservation has no interest in joining the Republic of Lakotah and said that the Lakota Freedom Delegation never presented their plan to the tribal council. Bordeaux stated that the group does not represent the Lakota people nor the support of the elected tribal governments. He did say, however, that Means "...made some good points". Joseph Brings Plenty, chairman of the Cheyenne River Lakota, agreed that the Lakota Freedom Delegation "...are not representative of the nation I represent..." but would not say whether he agreed or disagreed with their goals and message, noting there was some value in the group's actions in raising awareness for the history of the Lakota people.

The Alaskan Independence Party, in an announcement dated December 21, 2007, "applauded" the independent Lakota nation and granted it "full recognition". The secessionist movement Second Vermont Republic has also announced its support, and encouraged other American Indian groups to similarly declare independence from the United States.

=== International responses ===
According to Means, Venezuela's ambassador to the United States stated to the group that his country would not recognize Lakotah's independence based on Venezuela's interpretation of what the Lakotah Freedom Delegation is doing.

== See also ==
- Great Sioux Reservation
- Great Sioux Nation
- Land Back
