= Lakota (surname) =

Lakota is a surname. Notable people with the surname include:

- Hryhoriy Lakota (1883–1950), Ukrainian bishop
- Peter Lakota (born 1937), Slovenian alpine skier

== See also ==
- Lakota people, a Native American people
