= Oglala Lakota County, South Dakota =

County in South Dakota, United States

- County
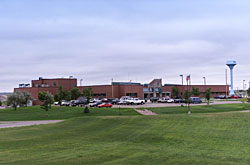
- Indian Health Service Hospital in Pine Ridge on the Pine Ridge Indian Reservation, November 2011

- Location within the U.S. state of South Dakota
- Coordinates: 43°22′0.215″N 102°33′41.349″W
- Country: United States
- State: South Dakota
- Founded: January 11, 1875
- Named for: Oglala Lakota people
- Seat: None (de jure); Hot Springs (de facto)
- Largest community: Pine Ridge

Area
  - Total: 2,096.352 sq mi (5,429.53 km^{2})
  - Land: 2,093.601 sq mi (5,422.40 km^{2})
  - Water: 2.751 sq mi (7.13 km^{2}) 0.1%

Population (2020)
  - Total: 13,672
  - Estimate (2025): 13,338 ▼
  - Density: 6.5304/sq mi (2.5214/km^{2})
- Time zone: UTC−7 (Mountain)
  - Summer (DST): UTC−6 (MDT)
- Congressional district: At-large
- Website: oglalalakotacountysd.gov
- Hot Springs in neighboring Fall River County serves as administrative center for county

Oglala Lakota County (known as Shannon County until May 2015) is a county in southwestern South Dakota, United States. As of the 2020 census, the population was 13,672. Oglala Lakota County does not have a functioning county seat; Hot Springs in neighboring Fall River County serves as its administrative center. The county was created as a part of the Dakota Territory in 1875, although it remains unorganized. Its largest community is Pine Ridge. Oglala Lakota is the only dry county in South Dakota.

The county lies entirely within the Pine Ridge Indian Reservation and contains part of Badlands National Park. It is one of five South Dakota counties entirely on an Indian reservation.

The county is named after the Oglala Lakota, a band of the Lakota people. Many of the county's inhabitants are members of this sub-tribe.

Reservation poverty affects the county, which is the poorest county in the United States (only 28 county-equivalents in the U.S. territories are poorer).

The newspaper for Oglala Lakota County is The Lakota Country Times.

== History ==
The Wounded Knee Massacre occurred in Oglala Lakota County in 1890.

The county was originally named for Peter C. Shannon, Chief Justice of the Dakota Territory Supreme Court. Until 1982, Shannon County and Washabaugh County, South Dakota, were the last unorganized counties in the United States. Although it was organized and received a home rule charter that year, the county, as noted above, contracts with Fall River County for its Auditor, Treasurer, and Registrar of Deeds.

On November 4, 2014, voters in the county voted by a margin of 2,161 to 526 to rename Shannon County to Oglala Lakota County. The name change was ratified by the state legislature on March 5, 2015. May 1, 2015 was proclaimed by the governor as the official day for renaming the county.

== Geography ==
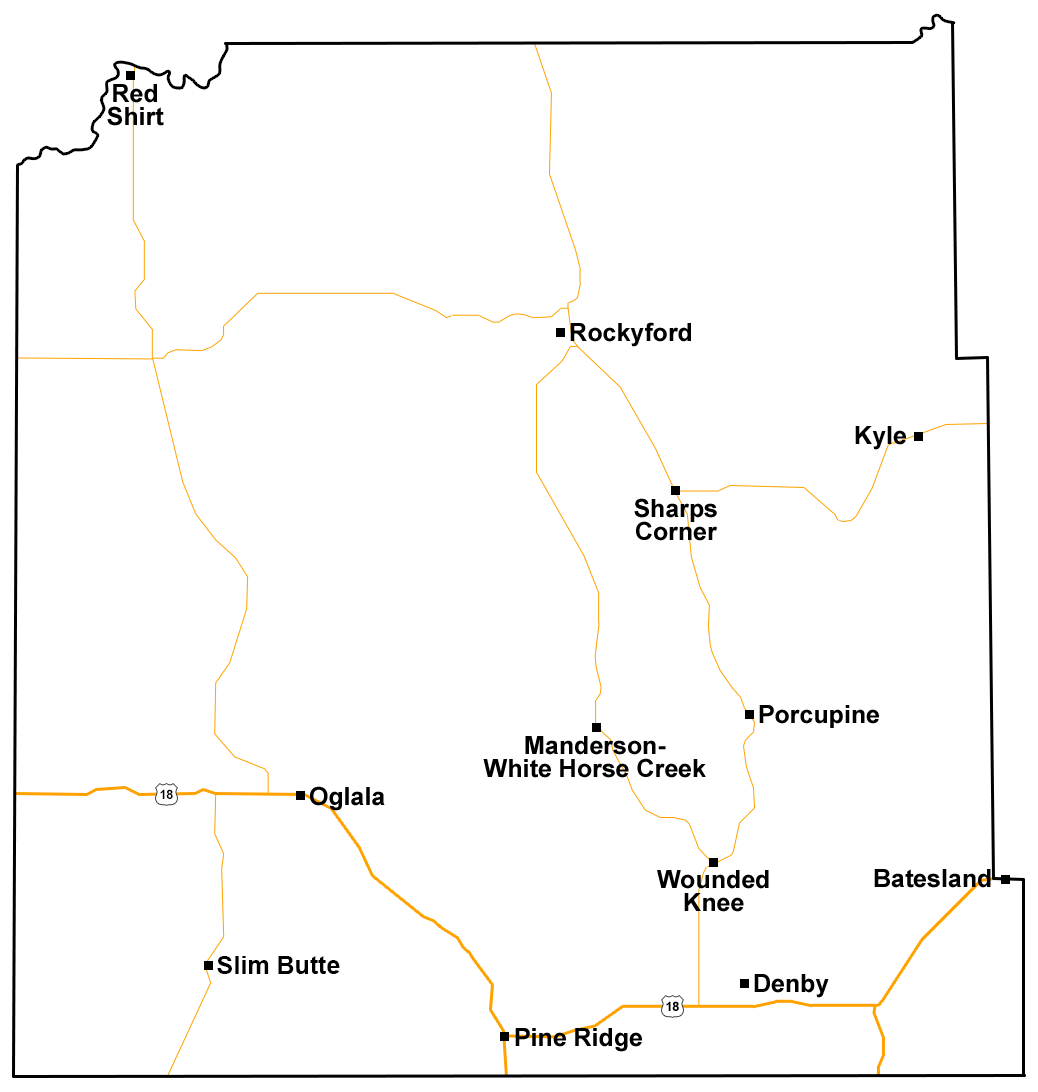
Locator map of populated places in Oglala Lakota County

Oglala Lakota County lies on the south side of South Dakota. Its south boundary line abuts the north boundary line of the state of Nebraska. The Cheyenne River flows northeastward along the northwest boundary of Oglala Lakota County. The White River flows northeastward through the central part of the county. The county terrain is composed of semi-arid rolling hills spotted with small mountain crests, oriented NE-SW. The terrain slopes to the northeast; its highest point is on the south boundary line, close to the SW corner, at 3,619 ft (1,103 m) ASL.

According to the United States Census Bureau, the county has a total area of 2,096.352 square miles (5,429.53 km^{2}), of which 2,093.601 square miles (5,422.40 km^{2}) is land and 2.751 square miles (7.13 km^{2}) (0.1%) is water. It is the 8th largest county in South Dakota by total area.

The county includes the headwaters of the Little White River.

=== Major highways ===
- U.S. Highway 18
- South Dakota Highway 40
- South Dakota Highway 391
- South Dakota Highway 407

=== Adjacent counties ===
- Pennington County – north
- Jackson County – northeast
- Bennett County – east
- Sheridan County, Nebraska – south
- Dawes County, Nebraska – southwest
- Fall River County – west
- Custer County – northwest

=== National protected area ===
- Badlands National Park (part)

=== Lakes ===
- Alkali Lake
- Denby Lake
- Lee Lake
- Oglala Lake
- Two Lance Lake
- Wakpamani Lake
- White Clay Lake

== Demographics ==
Historical population
Census	Pop.	Note	%±
1920	2,003		—
1930	4,058		102.6%
1940	5,366		32.2%
1950	5,669		5.6%
1960	6,000		5.8%
1970	8,198		36.6%
1980	11,323		38.1%
1990	9,902		−12.5%
2000	12,466		25.9%
2010	13,586		9.0%
2020	13,672		0.6%
2025 (est.)	13,338	▼	−2.4%
U.S. Decennial Census; 1790–1960 1900–1990; 1990–2000 2010–2020

According to a 2025 Census Bureau survey, Oglala Lakota County had the highest percentage of unmarried adults of any county in the United States.

=== 2020 census ===
As of the 2020 census, there were 13,672 people, 3,208 households, and 2,488 families residing in the county.

The population density was 6.5 inhabitants per square mile (2.5/km^{2}). There were 3,454 housing units, of which 7.1% were vacant; among occupied units, 57.7% were owner-occupied and 42.3% were renter-occupied. The homeowner vacancy rate was 0.6%, and the rental vacancy rate was 2.8%.

Of the residents, 37.1% were under the age of 18 and 7.5% were 65 years of age or older. The median age was 25.7 years, for every 100 females there were 103.2 males, and for every 100 females age 18 and over there were 102.3 males.

The racial makeup of the county was 3.3% White, 0.2% Black or African American, 93.8% American Indian and Alaska Native, 0.3% Asian, 0.3% from some other race, and 2.2% from two or more races. Hispanic or Latino residents of any race comprised 2.9% of the population.

Of the 3,208 households, 56.5% had children under the age of 18 living with them and 38.7% had a female householder with no spouse or partner present. About 17.4% of all households were made up of individuals and 5.1% had someone living alone who was 65 years of age or older.

=== 2000 census ===
As of the 2000 census, there were 12,466 people, 2,785 households, and 2,353 families residing in the county. The population density was 6 people per square mile (2.3 people/km^{2}). There were 3,123 housing units at an average density of 2 per square mile (0.77/km^{2}). The racial makeup of the county was 4.51% White, 0.08% Black or African American, 94.20% American Indian, 0.02% Asian, 0.05% Pacific Islander, 0.22% from other races, and 0.91% from two or more races. Hispanic or Latino of any race were 1.42% of the population.

There were 2,785 households, out of which 51.70% had children under the age of 18 living with them, 35.40% were married couples living together, 36.40% had a female householder with no husband present, and 15.50% were non-families. 13.20% of all households were made up of individuals, and 3.00% had someone living alone who was 65 years of age or older. The average household size was 4.36 and the average family size was 4.72.

The county population contained 45.30% under the age of 18, 10.60% from 18 to 24, 25.60% from 25 to 44, 13.80% from 45 to 64, and 4.80% who were 65 years of age or older. The median age was 21 years. For every 100 females there were 99.60 males. For every 100 females age 18 and over, there were 95.60 males.

The median income for a household in the county was $20,916, and the median income for a family was $20,897. Males had a median income of $25,170 versus $22,594 for females. The per capita income for the county was $6,286. About 45.10% of families and 52.30% of the population were below the poverty line, including 60.80% of those under age 18 and 36.00% of those age 65 or over.

== Health and life expectancy ==
Of 3,142 counties in the United States in 2014, Oglala Lakota County ranked last in the life expectancy of both male and female residents. Males in Oglala Lakota County lived an average of 62.8 years and females lived an average of 71.0 years,compared to the national average for life expectancy of 76.7 years for males and 81.5 years for females. The average life expectancy in Oglala Lakota County increased by 6.2 for males and 4.1 years for females between 1980 and 2014, compared to an increase in the national average for the same period of an increased life span of 6.7 years for men and 3.9 years for women.

In 2021, the Robert Wood Johnson Foundation ranked Oglala Lakota County last of 61 counties in South Dakota in "health outcomes," as measured by length and quality of life.

== Politics ==
The counties surrounding Oglala Lakota County are predominantly Republican, but, like most Native American counties, residents of Oglala Lakota are mostly Democrats, giving over 75 percent of the vote to every Democratic presidential nominee in every election back to 1984, making it one of the most Democratic counties in the United States. No Republican has carried the county in a presidential election since 1952. In 2012, Oglala Lakota County (then known as Shannon) was the county with the highest percentage of vote for Barack Obama in the United States. In 2024, the county was the fifth-strongest county for Kamala Harris, and her strongest county outside of the Washington metropolitan area. It was also Harris’s strongest county that was not majority or plurality-Black.

However, the local politics are a bit more divided: Oglala Lakota County lies within the 27th District of the South Dakota Legislature. Democrat Red Dawn Foster represents the county in the Senate, and Republicans Peri Pourier and Liz Marty May represent the county in the House.

United States presidential election results for Oglala Lakota County, South Dakota
Year	Republican		Democratic		Third party(ies)	
Year	No.	%	No.	%	No.	%
1924	992	88.89%	76	6.81%	48	4.30%
1928	469	43.63%	601	55.91%	5	0.47%
1932	463	36.69%	798	63.23%	1	0.08%
1936	667	49.93%	634	47.46%	35	2.62%
1940	1,094	58.04%	791	41.96%	0	0.00%
1944	562	53.93%	480	46.07%	0	0.00%
1948	641	44.09%	803	55.23%	10	0.69%
1952	957	55.29%	774	44.71%	0	0.00%
1956	782	45.18%	949	54.82%	0	0.00%
1960	655	36.59%	1,135	63.41%	0	0.00%
1964	557	24.16%	1,748	75.84%	0	0.00%
1968	533	29.68%	1,202	66.93%	61	3.40%
1972	356	22.10%	1,246	77.34%	9	0.56%
1976	301	27.84%	756	69.94%	24	2.22%
1980	438	25.96%	1,132	67.10%	117	6.94%
1984	324	17.71%	1,489	81.41%	16	0.87%
1988	256	17.31%	1,206	81.54%	17	1.15%
1992	225	13.63%	1,267	76.74%	159	9.63%
1996	253	11.08%	1,926	84.33%	105	4.60%
2000	252	12.90%	1,667	85.36%	34	1.74%
2004	526	12.48%	3,566	84.62%	122	2.90%
2008	331	9.88%	2,971	88.69%	48	1.43%
2012	188	5.98%	2,937	93.39%	20	0.64%
2016	241	8.30%	2,510	86.40%	154	5.30%
2020	297	9.28%	2,829	88.41%	74	2.31%
2024	406	13.26%	2,567	83.83%	89	2.91%

== Communities ==
=== Town ===
- Batesland

=== Census-designated places ===
- Kyle
- Manderson-White Horse Creek
- Oglala
- Pine Ridge
- Porcupine
- Wounded Knee

=== Unincorporated communities ===
- Denby
- Red Shirt
- Rockyford
- Sharps Corner

=== Townships ===
There are no townships. The county is divided into two areas of unorganized territory: East Oglala Lakota and West Oglala Lakota (formerly East Shannon and West Shannon, respectively).

== Education ==
The school district for the whole county is Oglala Lakota County School District. It operates Lakota Tech High School.

== See also ==
- List of counties in South Dakota
- National Register of Historic Places listings in Oglala Lakota County, South Dakota
