= Batesland, South Dakota =

Batesland, South Dakota Íŋyaŋ Šála
- Town
- Location in Oglala Lakota County and the state of South Dakota
- Coordinates: 43°07′32″N 102°06′03″W
- Country: United States
- State: South Dakota
- County: Oglala Lakota

Area
  - Total: 0.089 sq mi (0.23 km^{2})
  - Land: 0.089 sq mi (0.23 km^{2})
  - Water: 0 sq mi (0.00 km^{2})
- Elevation: 3,406 ft (1,038 m)

Population (2020)
  - Total: 100
  - Density: 1,109.2/sq mi (428.27/km^{2})
- Time zone: UTC-7 (Mountain (MST))
  - Summer (DST): UTC-6 (MDT)
- ZIP code: 57716
- Area code: 605
- FIPS code: 46-03860
- GNIS feature ID: 1267279

Batesland (Lakota: Íŋyaŋ Šála; "Red Stone") is a town in southeastern Oglala Lakota County, South Dakota, United States. The population was 100 at the 2020 census.

== History ==
A post office called Batesland has been in operation since 1923. The town was named in honor of C. A. Bates, who had surveyed the site.

== Geography ==
According to the United States Census Bureau, the town has a total area of 0.09 square miles (0.23 km^{2}), all land.

== Demographics ==
Historical population
Census	Pop.	Note	%±
1970	135		—
1980	163		20.7%
1990	124		−23.9%
2000	88		−29.0%
2010	108		22.7%
2020	100		−7.4%
U.S. Decennial Census

=== 2010 census ===
As of the census of 2010, there were 108 people, 29 households, and 21 families residing in the town. The population density was 1,200.0 inhabitants per square mile (463.3/km^{2}). There were 33 housing units at an average density of 366.7 per square mile (141.6/km^{2}). The racial makeup of the town was 2.8% White and 97.2% Native American. Hispanic or Latino of any race were 3.7% of the population.

There were 29 households, of which 62.1% had children under the age of 18 living with them, 24.1% were married couples living together, 31.0% had a female householder with no husband present, 17.2% had a male householder with no wife present, and 27.6% were non-families. 20.7% of all households were made up of individuals, and 3.4% had someone living alone who was 65 years of age or older. The average household size was 3.72 and the average family size was 4.48.

The median age in the town was 22 years. 44.4% of residents were under the age of 18; 9.3% were between the ages of 18 and 24; 23.2% were from 25 to 44; 20.3% were from 45 to 64; and 2.8% were 65 years of age or older. The gender makeup of the town was 56.5% male and 43.5% female.

=== 2000 census ===
As of the census of 2000, there were 88 people, 30 households, and 24 families residing in the town. The population density was 1,136.7 inhabitants per square mile (438.9/km^{2}). There were 34 housing units at an average density of 439.2 per square mile (169.6/km^{2}). The racial makeup of the town was 13.64% White and 86.36% Native American.

There were 30 households, out of which 40.0% had children under the age of 18 living with them, 36.7% were married couples living together, 23.3% had a female householder with no husband present, and 20.0% were non-families. 20.0% of all households were made up of individuals, and none had someone living alone who was 65 years of age or older. The average household size was 2.93 and the average family size was 3.25.

In the town, the population was spread out, with 35.2% under the age of 18, 9.1% from 18 to 24, 27.3% from 25 to 44, 22.7% from 45 to 64, and 5.7% who were 65 years of age or older. The median age was 28 years. For every 100 females, there were 104.7 males. For every 100 females age 18 and over, there were 96.6 males.

The median income for a household in the town was $32,250, and the median income for a family was $27,500. Males had a median income of $30,000 versus $28,750 for females. The per capita income for the town was $13,735. There were 45.8% of families and 39.2% of the population living below the poverty line, including 39.4% of under eighteens and 100.0% of those over 64.

== Education ==
The school district for the whole county is Oglala Lakota County School District 65-1.

Batesland School opened in 1926 and its initial enrollment was below 20. By 2001 its enrollment was 210.

The district also operates Lakota Tech High School.
