= Beth Lydy =

American actress, operetta singer, writer, educator, and theatrical producer

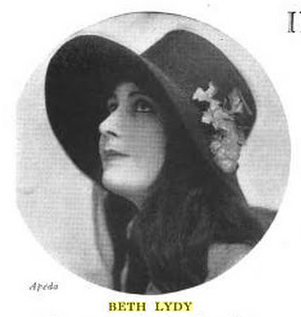
Beth Lydy, from a 1917 publication.

Beth Lydy (c. 1896 – February 6, 1979), who also used the name Lyda Betti, was an American actress, operetta singer, writer, educator, and theatrical producer; she was the wife of violinist and broadcaster Eddy Brown.

== Early life ==
Lydy was born in Indiana and raised in Pine Ridge, South Dakota, where her father John W. Lydy worked as a government teacher on a Sioux reservation. She and her sister Ruth Lydy attended school in Frankfort, Indiana, and in Chicago.

== Career ==
Lydy's musical stage roles included Hilma in The Girl from Brazil (1916); Marlene in Her Soldier Boy (1916–1917), a wartime romance; and the title role in The Rainbow Girl (1918). During World War I Lydy performed in a vaudeville show in Greenwich, Connecticut put on by Stage Women's War Relief. She also contributed a recipe for "Deviled Crabs" to a 1916 celebrity cookbook that raised funds for the Red Cross.

In the 1930s, Lydy wrote radio scripts for WOR, the New York radio station where her husband was musical director. The pair also produced summer musical programming in Connecticut between the World Wars. After World War II, she and Eddy Brown established the Accademia Internazionale di Bel Canto in Bordighera, Italy.

In 1956, they accepted a joint position at the University of Cincinnati College-Conservatory of Music, as artistic coordinators and master teachers.

== Personal life ==
Lydy married violinist Eddy Brown as his second wife in 1926, in Riverside, California. She was widowed when Eddy Brown died in 1974. Lydy Brown died in 1979, in Peru, Indiana. She was about 83 years old.
