= Lakota Local School District =

Lakota Local School District may refer to:

- Lakota Local School District (Butler County), Ohio
- Lakota Local School District (Sandusky County), a school districts in Ohio
