= Lakota Tech High School =

High school in South Dakota, United States

Coordinates: 43.04535°N 102.45881°W

Lakota Tech High School (Lakota: Lakota Wówaši Waúŋspe Waŋkátuya Owáyawa) is a public high school in unincorporated Oglala Lakota County, South Dakota, near the Pine Ridge census-designated place and with a Pine Ridge postal address. It is in the Pine Ridge Indian Reservation. It is a part of the Oglala Lakota County School District.

Its high school program is one of five high schools that are within the boundaries of the reservation. Additionally, of all of the public high schools on Indian reservations, it is the only one focusing on technical and career-oriented curricula.

== History ==
Previously the district did not operate a high school building and required high school students staying with the district to attend virtual school.

In August 2019, the district and the state of South Dakota began a partnership to establish the first non-Bureau of Indian Education public high school on the reservation. Kristi Noem, Governor of South Dakota, jointly announced this with management of the school district.

In July 2019, the district hired Stephanie Eisenmenger as the first principal. Groundbreaking occurred in November 2019. There were plans to open in-person use of the school earlier, but due to the COVID-19 pandemic in South Dakota the school itself was not yet open in July 2020. It is centered on career and technical education (CTE). The district had anticipated that about 100 students would enroll at the school. The school opened in fall 2020.

The enrollment at the end of the 2020–2021 school year was almost 400.

In 2022, the Lieutenant Governors' STEM Scholarship Program gave the school $1,000 as an award because the curricula had science, technology, engineering, and mathematics (STEM) content, and the funds were to be used on weather-related content.

== Athletics ==
By February 2021, the gymnasium opened, and that month it began its athletics programs; the school is not under tribal law so, during the COVID-19 pandemic, it did not have to follow tribal directives to end athletics temporarily. This meant would-be athletes transferred to Lakota Tech. In November 2020, the South Dakota High School Activities Association (SDHSAA) decided that a student wishing to participate in a school athletics program at a particular school may move to that school if the student's previous school had suspended its own athletics programs.

== See also ==
- Pine Ridge School - Bureau of Indian Education (BIE) K-12 school
