= Pine Ridge School =

School in South Dakota, United States

Coordinates: 43.0223°N 102.5696°W

Pine Ridge School (PRS) is a Bureau of Indian Education (BIE)-operated K-12 school in Pine Ridge, South Dakota. It is within the Pine Ridge Indian Reservation. Its high school program is one of five high schools that are within the reservation boundaries. The school's cornerstone was placed on February 8, 1879. The current high school facility opened in 1995.

== Board controversy ==
In 1990, there was a conflict between parents and board members, with the former criticizing one board member for being employed and having relatives employed by the school itself. The chairperson of the board, Bennett Sierra, stated that the conflict could put programs and the construction of a new campus at risk. In May 1990, the Bureau of Indian Affairs (BIA) superintendent of education, Basil Brave Heart, stated that a change in supervisors for the board member resolved the conflict of interest while parents had stated that even having relatives employed by the school still meant there was a conflict of interest.

== Programs ==
The school has an immersion program for the Lakota language. Students from Kindergarten through grade 8 are eligible. It began in 2021.

== Campus ==
The school has separate dormitory facilities for boys and girls, and a classroom building for all grades.
