= The red road =

English-language concept of the right path of life

The red road is a modern English-language concept of the right path of life, as inspired by some of the beliefs found in a variety of Native American spiritual teachings. The term is used primarily in the Pan-Indian and New Age communities; it is rarely among traditional Indigenous people, who have terms in their own languages for their spiritual ways. Native Americans' spiritual teachings are diverse. With over 500 federally-recognized tribes in just the US, some regional practices and beliefs might be similar, the cultures are highly individualized. Individual ceremonies and particular beliefs tend to be unique to the people of these diverse bands, tribes and nations.

== Black Elk ==
In his book Black Elk Speaks, John G. Neihardt, a non-Native, explored spiritual beliefs as he says they were told to him by Black Elk (1863–1950), an Oglala Lakota. Near the end of his life, Black Elk converted to Catholicism, becoming a catechist; however, he also continued to practice Lakota ceremonies. His grandson, George Looks Twice said, "He was comfortable praying with this pipe and his rosary, and participated in Mass and Lakota ceremonies on a regular basis". In the late 20th century, Neihardt's work was criticized as diverging from, and misrepresenting, Lakota beliefs and ceremonies.

Neihardt said that Black Elk believed he had an obligation to "help to bring my people back into the sacred hoop, that they might again walk the red road in a sacred manner pleasing to the powers of the universe that are one power." However, Black Elk defined "the red road" as part of the larger, Medicine Wheel concept, not necessarily the same definition that others are using: "Black Elk, in The Sacred Pipe, speaks of the Red Road as the north-south cross of the Medicine Wheel, and the east-west cross as the black or blue road".

"Hear me, four quarters of the world--a relative I am! Give me the strength to walk the soft earth, a relative to all that is! Give me the eyes to see and the strength to understand, that I may be like you. With your power only can I face the winds.

Great Spirit, Great Spirit, my Grandfather, all over the earth the faces of living things are all alike. With tenderness have these come up out of the ground. Look upon these faces of children without number and with children in their arms, that they may face the wind and walk the good road to the day of quiet.
This is my prayer; hear me now!"

- "Black Elk's Prayer for All Life"

== Treatment of addictions ==
In some modern addiction treatment programs, the idea of the Red Road may be part of the recovery process. Some of these programs are primarily for Native populations, but take a Pan-Indian or New Age approach, through "the Sweat lodge, the Red Road, and the Recovery Medicine Wheel." "Red Road to Recovery" programs are not always run by or for Native people, but may be groups of predominantly non-Native, New Age adherents.

Other recovery programs for Native American and First Nations Peoples, such as the guidelines by the Substance Abuse and Mental Health Services Administration (SAMHSA) and other government agencies addressing recovery, mental health and Indigenous rights, rather than take a pan-Indian approach, stress that, "while regional practices and language dialects might be similar, each tribe is unique and caution should be used to avoid generalizations" and that, among "more than 2 million people in 300-500 different American Indian tribal groups, each with its own culture and responses to specific situations... Belief and practices vary widely from tribe to tribe."

== Mainstream usage ==
The phrase "The Red Road" has been picked up by many non-Native adherents of New Age and hippie lifestyles, based on their interpretation of Native American spirituality. Critics have accused such followers of cultural appropriation and misrepresentation.

== See also ==
- Alcohol and Native Americans
- Blessing Way
- Cultural imperialism
- Curandero
- Declaration on the Rights of Indigenous Peoples
- Great Race (Native American legend)
- Indigenous decolonization
- Midewiwin
- Medicine wheel (symbol)
- Music for The Native Americans, a 1994 album by Robbie Robertson and the Red Road Ensemble
- Native American Church
- Native American Spirituality Movements
- Neoshamanism
- Pan-Indianism
- Plastic Shaman
- Stereotypes of Native Americans
- Traditional knowledge
