= Great Race (Native American legend) =

Native American legend

The Great Race is a Native American legend surrounding the Red Racetrack, a ring shaped depression surrounding the interior of the Black Hills. The legend tells the story of when buffalo and man raced each other to establish order in the universe. The stories differ from tribe to tribe but the constant theme is that man established supremacy over the buffalo. This story is also associated with the origins of the Sun Dance and the Medicine Lodge. Taking place in July, Sun Dance is four to eight days of dancing in order to try to connect with the Great Spirit.

== Suhtai ==
This story relates to the origins concerning the medicine lodge. Told by Fire Wolfe, "The venerable Suhtai Buffalo and Sun Dance priest." The story takes place before the Suhtai and the Tsistsistas became one tribe. In this time buffalo ate human beings. A Suhtai man dreamed that he was shooting at a certain buffalo however his arrow turned away and hit another buffalo standing far away. This dream occurred for three nights. Concerned, the young man spoke to the tribe's elders about his dreams. They responded by telling him that the dreams meant nothing. However, that night the young man had the same dream and the young man knew what he had to do. The next day he woke up early to go hunting. Just like in his dream when he shot at a buffalo his arrow diverted its path and hit another buffalo cow. The young man followed her until sundown but could never catch up with her so he went back to camp.

The next morning the young man went out looking for the buffalo cow again and found her standing in front of a tipi but, now she was a beautiful woman. The young man fell in love with her and they had a son who looked exactly like his mother.

One morning the young man discovered that his wife and child were missing. For four days the young man searched for his family and on the fourth day he came to a high ridge and a herd of buffalo were grazing below. As the young man approached the herd, a young buffalo calf came running out to meet him; this buffalo was his son. The young man told his son that he wished to follow them. However his son informed him that the trip was too long and that he would die. Still the young man continued despite his son's warning. A few days later the buffalo decided to put the young man through a test, by seeing if he could identify his son in a group of other buffalo calf. Before the test the young man's son informed him that he would set up various signals so his father could identify him. When the test came the father and son had no problem communicating with each other so the young man passed the test.

The herd proceeded to carry on after this until a few days later when the young calf again approached his father. The calf's grandfather and grandmother wanted to kill the young man by charging at him. Again the young calf informed his father on how he could defeat them, instructing his father to stay calm and to have a pure heart. The grandfather then charged at the young man but was unable to kill him realizing that the young man had "a strong heart and great human power". The grandmother then proceeded to charge but she too realized that he had "a strong heart and great human power". Passing another test the herd carried on and so did the young man.

The young calf then approached his father again informing him that his grandfather was going to challenge him to a race in an attempt to kill the young man. The young calf told his father to take the black stick and not the red one and to run on the inside near the rim rock. He also instructed his father to duck down when his grandfather turned around for it was here that he would be trying to kill him. The race began and the young man ran along the inside of the track like his son instructed. The grandfather then turned around and charged at the young man. The young man ducked when the buffalo charged, and the buffalo ran by the young man off a cliff to his death.

The animals then proceeded to hold a council and decided to have a great race between man and buffalo. If man won he would eat buffalo and buffalo would no longer eat man. However, if buffalo won they would eat man and man would no longer eat buffalo. All birds and animals showed up and painted their bodies the colors that they are now today. The buffalo selected Slim Walking Woman to be their racer "for she was the fastest and most long winded". The animals and birds chose their sides and an overwhelming number sided with buffalo. Only swift hawk, crow, magpie, and eagle sided with the young man. The race began and Slim Walking Woman got off to an early lead as magpie flew very high. Many racers passed out from exhaustion. Slim Walking Woman lead the whole race but just as she was about to pass the finish line magpie plunged from the sky passing her right before she crossed the line.

After the race the buffalo elders said they must have the medicine lodge. In it "all will be performed that has happened since the beginning of this great race. On the fourth day of the ceremony it will belong to human beings". The ceremony gave man the power over buffalo and from then on the Suhtaio considered themselves to be the buffalo people.

== Lakota ==
The Lakota were the last native occupants of the Black Hills and had the land seized from them by the United States government in 1877. The Great Race story explains the origin of the Black Hills and the establishment of order in the universe. Lakota associate the Racetrack with gathering sacred stones for the Sundance ceremonies. They believe the race took place at Inyan Kara and occurs before the summer equinox. Normally this story is not associated with the Falling Star stories that originated in the 1930s and 1940s by Nicholas Black Elk. Lakota versions of the story refer specifically to the Black Hills and the Race Track. The Lakota version says that the race was between the "two-leggeds" and the "four-leggeds" and would determine who would eat who. Lakota also suggest that the race still goes on today as animals from around the world gather in order to reenact the race. Lakotas also believe that the race track was where sundance originated and order in was established.

== Cheyenne ==
The Cheyenne/Suhtai inhabited the Black Hills from 1670–1876, also believing that the Great Race took place on Inyan Kara Mountain. The Cheyenne Great Race myth explains the origins of the Cheyenne Sundance or Medicine Lodge. The Cheyenne tradition of the great race is related to the Suhtai's version. It is unknown if the Cheyenne's associated the great race with a constellation like the Lakota. The story of the Great Race plays an important role in Cheyenne cosmology, in establishing order among living things. In the Cheyenne and Lakota versions the race starts and ends at Buffalo Gap. Other versions of the story refer to the first Sun Dance near Bear Lodge Butte and Sundance Mountain.

== Current day traditions related to the story ==
During the Sundance, the arrow thrust through the piece of meat represents the arrow in the side of the buffalo woman. Both arrow and meat are placed in the Thunder's nest as an offering. The man's child looking like his mother is in accord with the Cheyenne kinship system by which a child belongs to the mother's people. The child became a buffalo calf because the buffalo people were his mother's tribe. Red and black paint used on the rafter beams and center pole of the Medicine Lodge are symbols of the painted sticks using in the great race. During the final dance in the Medicine Lodge, the instructor and pledger dance side by side. While they are dancing, the instructor pushes the pledger against the cottonwood brush surrounding the altar. This represents the attempt of the buffalo grandfather to push the Suhtai over the edge of the cliff. The only part of the buffalo not eaten by the Cheyenne was the sweetbreads (thymus gland) which the Cheyenne call ‘human fat'. This was because the "buffalo originally ate human beings." It is believed that some buffalo that had killed a man were surprised by enemies. They fled, taking some human flesh with them. This fat became internalized in the buffalo, leaving a residue of human flesh in the buffalo's body to this day.

== See also ==
- The red road
