= Solomon King (artist) =

Canadian Anishinaabe sculptor

Solomon King is a Canadian Anishinaabe sculptor and stone artisan. King is from Neyaashiinigmiing, Ontario and is a member of Chippewas of Nawash Unceded First Nation.

== Career ==
King was commissioned to design a turtle sculpture for the Spirit Garden at Nathan Phillips Square in Toronto. The turtle is positioned climbing above a boulder and represents survivors of the residential school system. The turtle has tiles on its back symbolizing various indigenous peoples. It is made out of limestone, is six feet tall, and weighs ten tonnes. King started working on the project after a discussion with the Toronto Council Fire Native Cultural Centre. He sculpted the turtle on farmland in Barrie.

King is founder and principal mason of Stone Artisan Studios Ltd in Toronto.

In May 2022 King was selected with Emily Kewageshig to create public art for the renovation of the Raymond A. Barker Water Treatment Plant in Collingwood, Ontario.

== Notable works ==
- King, Solomon (2025). Restoration of Identity [limestone sculpture]. Spirit Garden, Nathan Phillips Square, Toronto, Ontario, Canada.
- King, Solomon; Lo, Byron (November 11, 2014). Sagamok War Memorial [mixed stone]. Sagamok, Ontario, Canada.
- King, Solomon; King, Trinh (2021). Notes from the Earth [mixed materials]. Myhal Centre, University of Toronto, Toronto, Canada. –via University of Toronto Art Museum.
