= Toronto Sign =

Illuminated sign in Ontario, Canada

- Three-dimensional sign
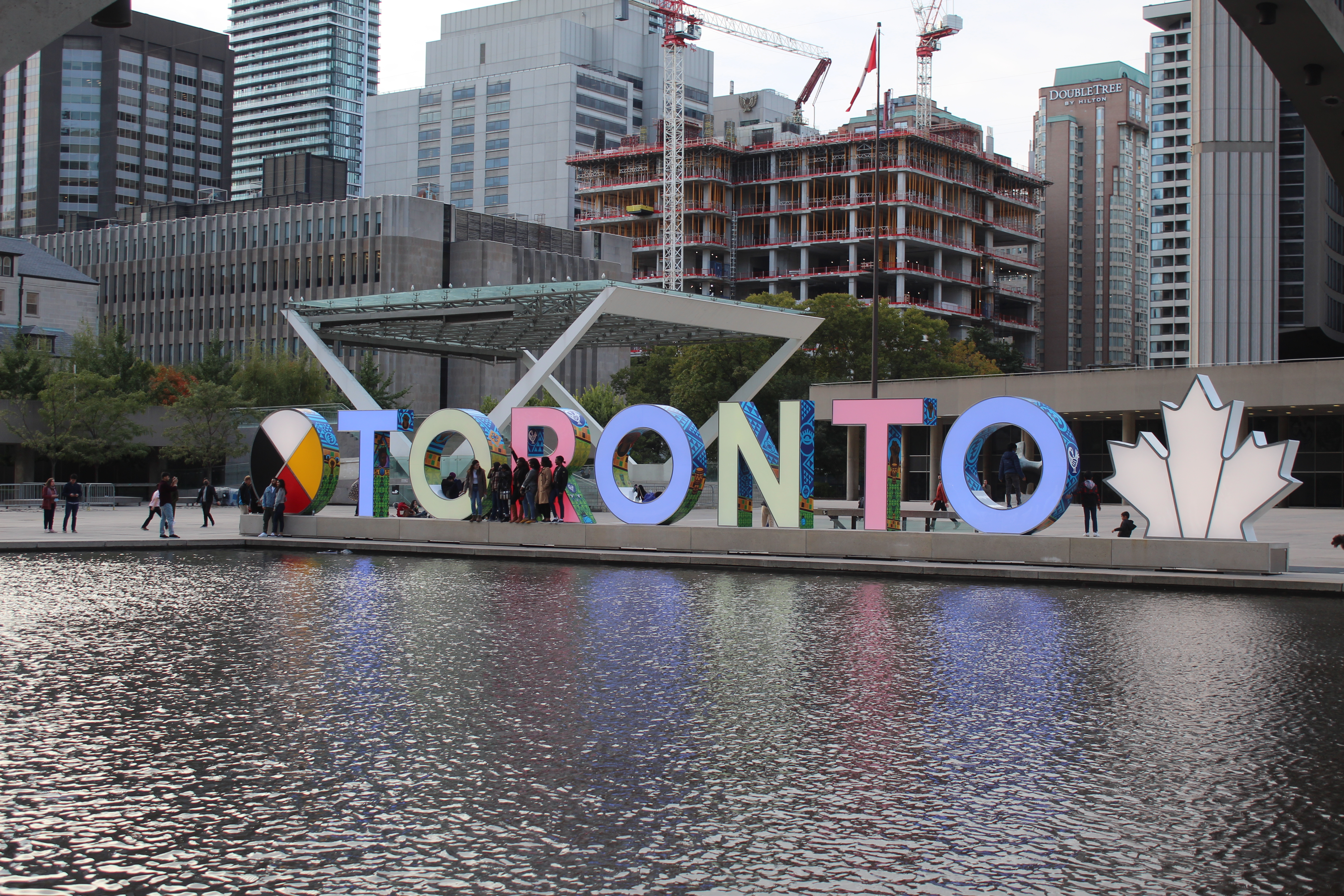
- The new Toronto Sign in September 2020
- Cost: CA$760,000
- Owner: City of Toronto
- Location: Nathan Phillips Square; Toronto, Ontario, Canada
- Location in Toronto
- Coordinates: 43°39′9″N 79°23′1″W
- Website: www.toronto.ca/toronto-sign/

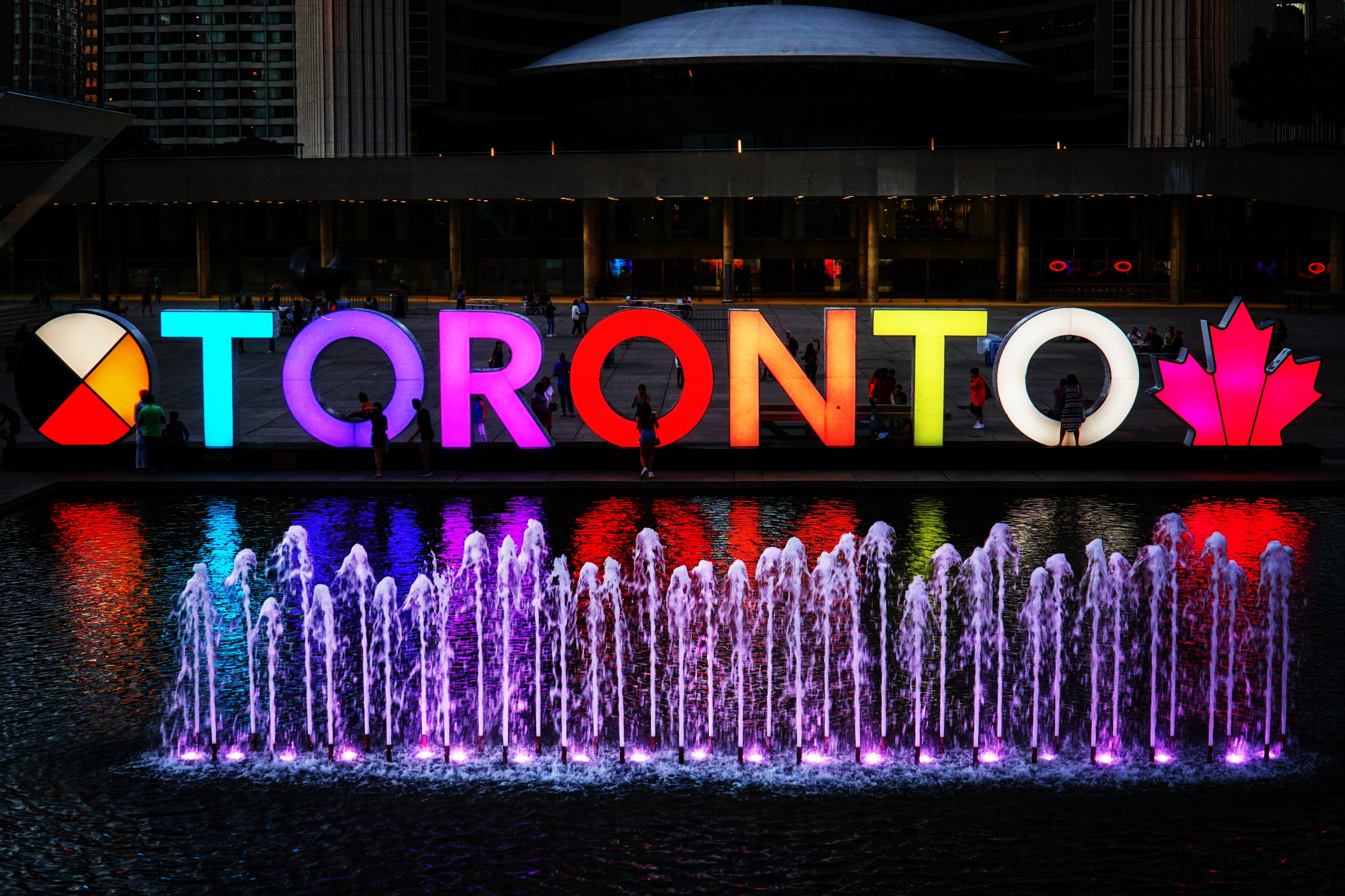
The original Toronto sign at night in 2018

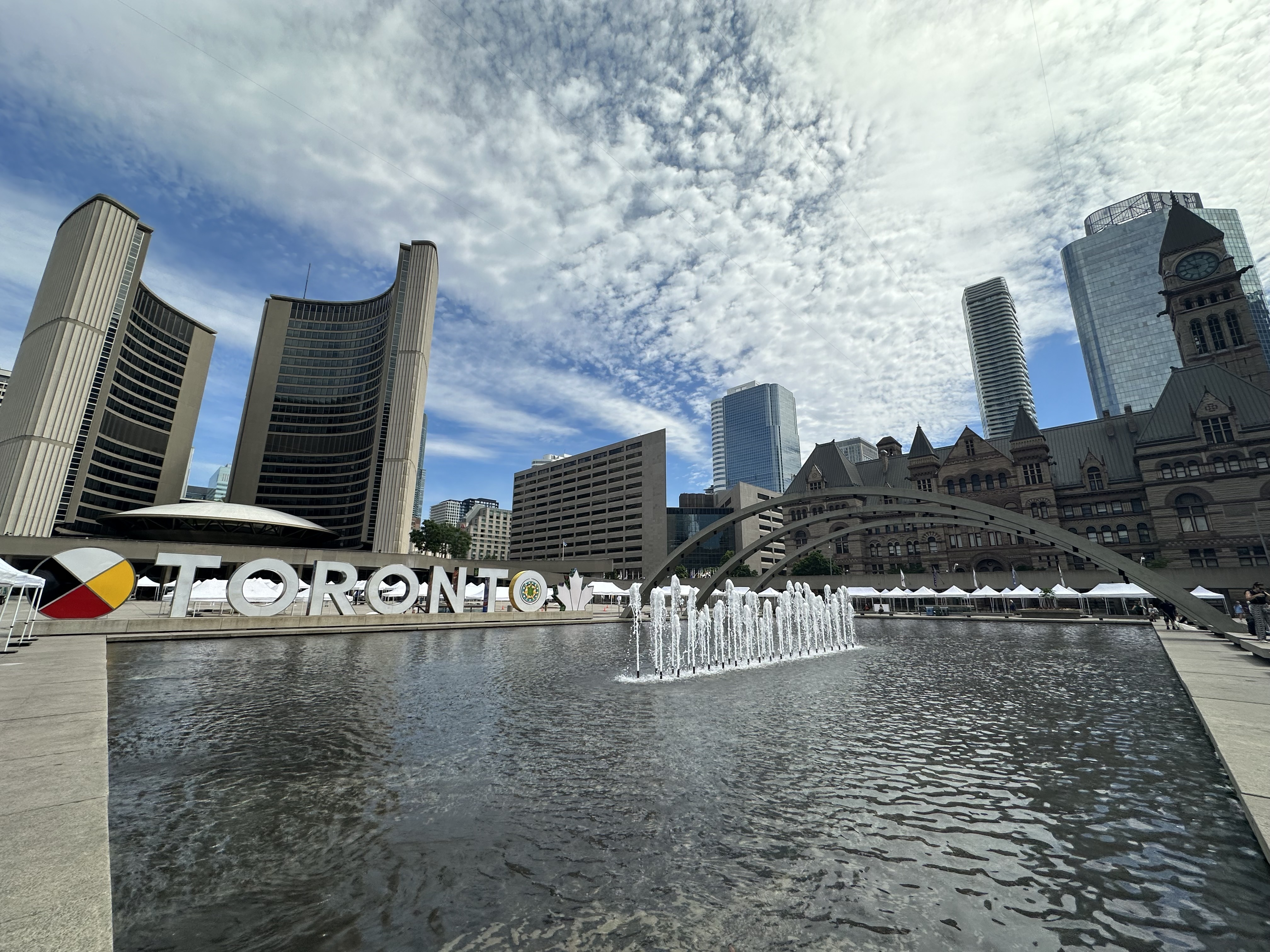
Toronto Sign with Toronto City Hall and Old City Hall in the background in July 2024.

The Toronto Sign is an illuminated three-dimensional sign in Nathan Phillips Square in Toronto, Ontario, Canada, that spells the city's name. It is 3 metres (9.8 ft) tall and 22 metres (72 ft) long (prior to the addition of the maple leaf and the medicine wheel), lit by LED lights that can create an estimated 228 million colour combinations.

== History ==
Originally installed for the 2015 Pan American Games as a temporary attraction meant to be dismantled in November 2016 at the earliest, the City of Toronto decided to continue to operate the sign after it became popular with tourists and residents. Explaining the city's decision to keep it, Councillor Norm Kelly said the sign is as iconic as the CN Tower and that it has become known all over the world. It had appeared in an estimated 120 million photographs in various social media outlets by June 2016.

Having an estimated three- to five-year lifespan, the sign began to show signs of wear and tear by June 2016. Toronto City Council rejected spending another CA$150,000 on the sign, and city staff proposed replacing the sign with a permanent version. The sign was vandalized in October 2016 during the overnight Nuit Blanche event. Graffiti was applied using permanent markers, but Nuit Blanche employees were able to remove the graffiti.

A 3D maple leaf was added to the Toronto sign adjacent to the final "O" in December 2016 to mark the 150th anniversary of Canadian Confederation. The sign was modified again in 2018 to mark National Indigenous Peoples Day. The change added a 3D pan–First Nations medicine wheel adjacent to the first "T" and new vinyl wraps for each letter consisting of a birch bark pattern with various First Nations symbols on them. The wraps were removed, while the medicine wheel remains.

The sign experienced more wear in early 2017, due to uneven erosion at the bases of each of the three Os from hundreds of thousands of posing feet from those wanting to take pictures with the sign, exposing the black rubber padding underneath. In 2019, Toronto City Council reaffirmed its plan to replace the original sign with a robust, permanent structure. A resident of the rural community of Orono in Clarington, located east of Toronto, has requested that the original sign be donated to Orono.

On September 10, 2020, John Tory, the then–mayor of Toronto, officially announced that the sign was to be replaced with a permanent version by Toronto-based Unit 11 for $760,000, which includes the cost to remove the old sign, and is funded by both city reserve "rainy-day" funds and civic crowdfunding. The new sign would be easier to maintain and have augmented lighting capacity. The new sign was unveiled by Tory on September 18, 2020, and featured a wrap to commemorate the United Nations' International Decade for People of African Descent.

== Lawsuit ==
Although the Toronto Sign is not an original idea—several European cities had erected similar signs in prior years—a local marketing consultant filed a lawsuit claiming he presented the idea to the city and staff before the city unveiled plans for the sign. Named in the CA$2.5-million lawsuit is the City of Toronto government as well as Mayor Tory and councillors Josh Colle and Michael Thompson. The statement of defence, filed February 19, 2016, argues the concept itself is nothing new, and therefore the suit should be dismissed: "Interactive, three-dimensional signs bearing the name of a city are commonplace around the world. They can be found in Amsterdam, Guadalajara, Budapest, Istanbul and many other cities".
