= Nathan Phillips Square =

Public square in Downtown Toronto

- City square
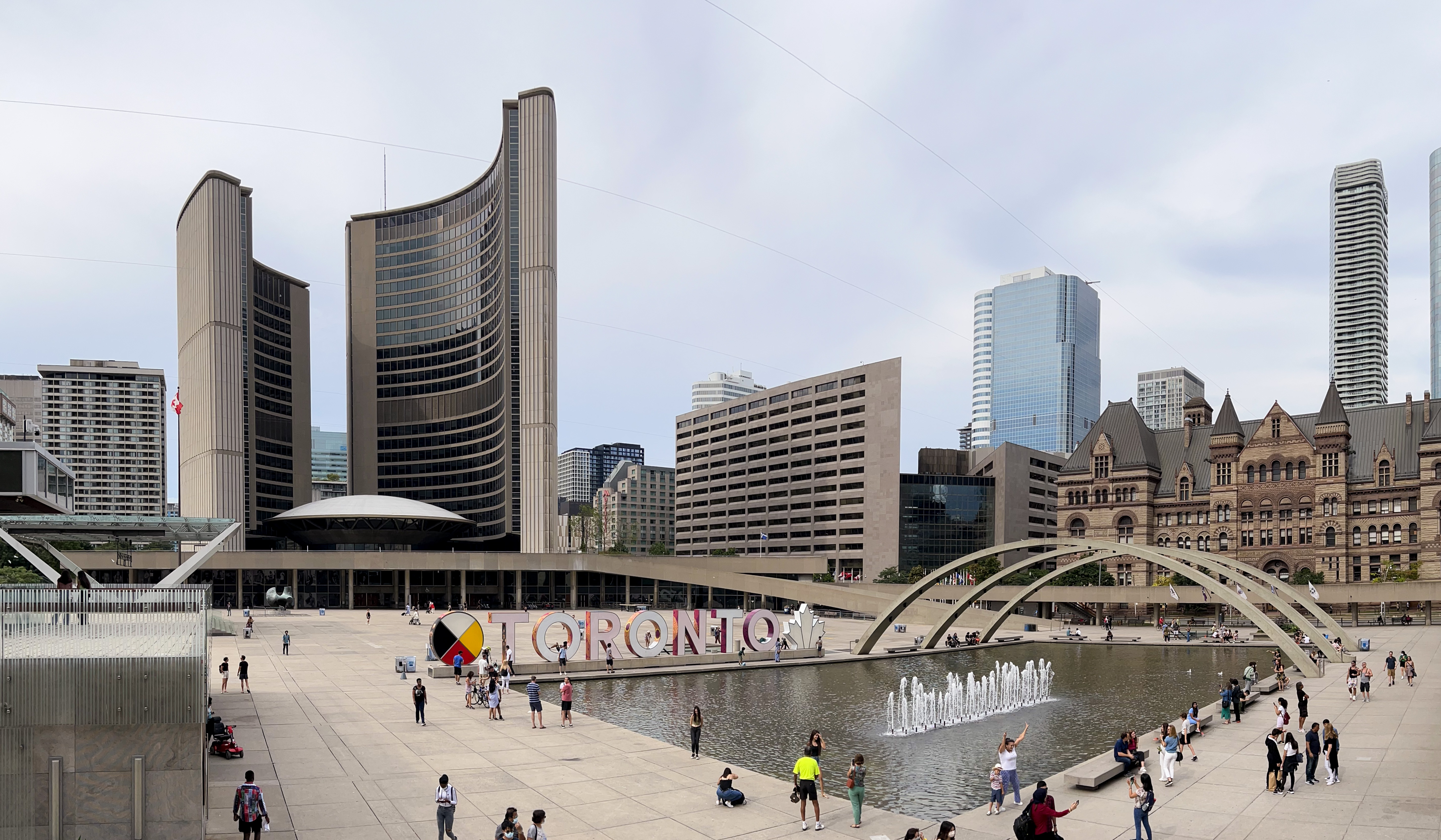
- View of square from southwest
- Features: reflecting pool/skating rink; peace garden
- Design: Viljo Revell
- Opened: September 13, 1965
- Amenities: skate rentals;underground parking
- Area: 4.85 hectares (12.0 acres)
- Surface: concrete
- Dedicated to: Nathan Phillips, Mayor of Toronto
- Owner: City of Toronto
- Location: Bay Street and Queen Street; Toronto, Ontario, Canada
- Public transit: at Queen or Osgoode
- Location of Nathan Phillips Square in Toronto
- Coordinates: 43°39′9″N 79°23′1″W

Nathan Phillips Square is an urban plaza in Toronto, Ontario, Canada. It forms the forecourt to Toronto City Hall, or New City Hall, at the intersection of Queen Street West and Bay Street, and is named after Nathan Phillips, mayor of Toronto from 1955 to 1962. The square was designed by the City Hall's architect Viljo Revell and landscape architect Richard Strong. It opened in 1965. The square is the site of concerts, art displays, a weekly farmers' market, the winter festival of lights, and other public events, including demonstrations. During the winter months, the reflecting pool is converted into an ice rink for ice skating. The square attracts an estimated 1.5 million visitors yearly. With an area of 4.85 hectares (12.0 acres), it is Canada's largest city square.

Nathan Phillips Square is used regularly for art exhibits, concerts, rallies and other ceremonies. Annual events include a New Year's Eve Party and the Cavalcade of Lights Festival lighting of the official Christmas tree. The annual Nuit Blanche art festival sets up art exhibits in the square, and has also utilized the parking garage located underneath the square.

== Features ==
The square is rectangular in shape, with the edge of the city hall meeting the square on an angle on the north side. The main portion of the square is paved with two sizes of reinforced concrete slabs. The square has a reflecting pool, a peace garden, a permanent stage and several sculptures, including Three Way Piece No.2: Archer by Henry Moore. Around the remaining perimeter of the square runs an elevated concrete walkway. Outside the walkway are treed lawns dotted with various other memorials and monuments, such as Oscar Nemon's statue of Sir Winston Churchill (c. 1977), and a Roman column. Beneath the square is one of the world's largest underground parking garages. In 2012, illuminated "disappearing" fountains were installed among the slabs, used for decoration and cooling. The square is property of the City of Toronto. Smoking is prohibited in the entire square.

=== Elevated walkway ===
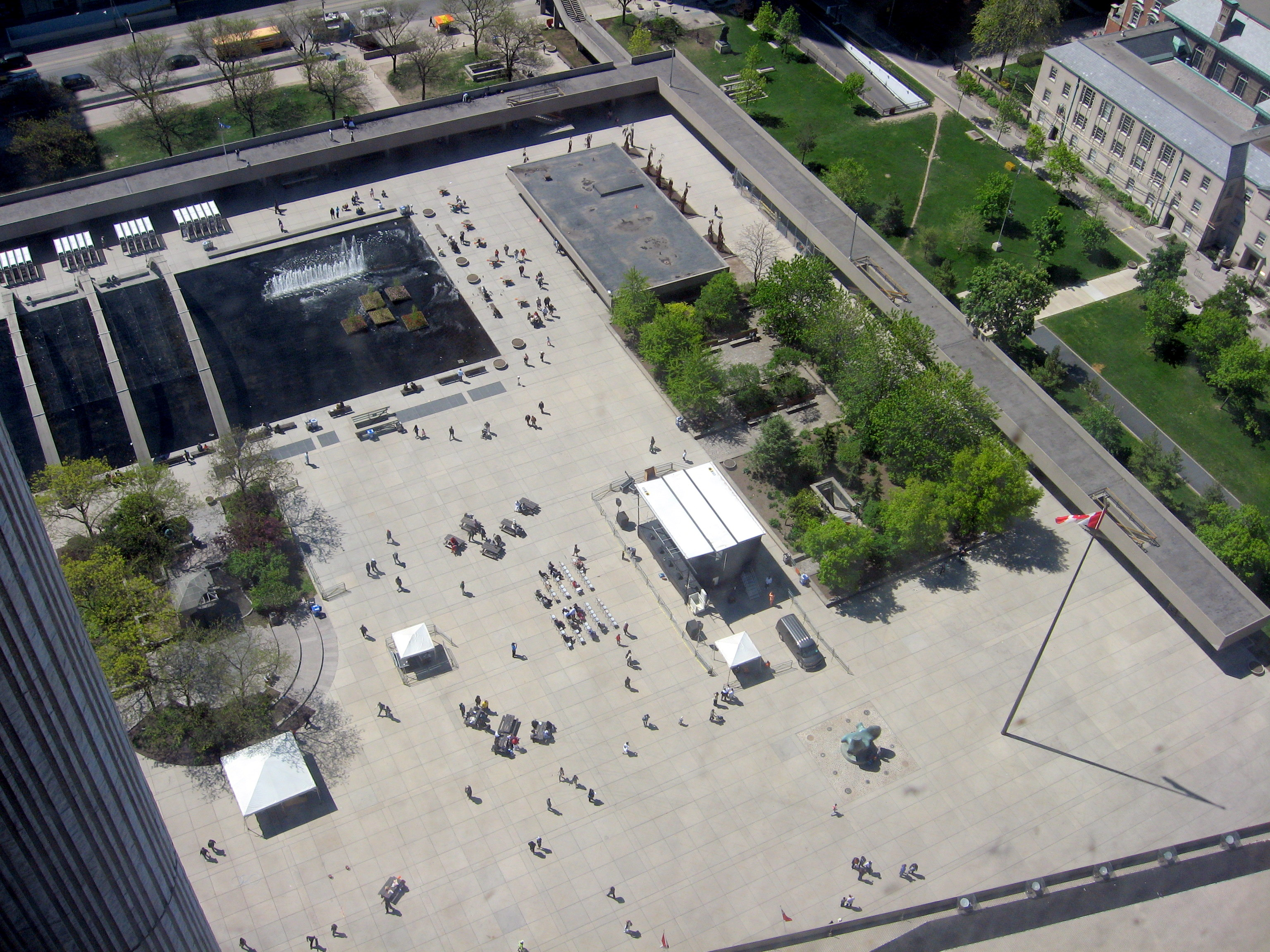
An elevated walkway extends around the square's perimeter.

The elevated concrete walkway connects to the podium of the City Hall at the height of its roof and extends around the perimeter of the square. Staircases connect the walkway to the floor of the square in several locations. On the south side, the walkway extends across Queen Street to the Sheraton Hotel. On the west side, the walkway is connected to the back of the permanent stage, which also serves as a grand staircase. The walkway is closed during winter months.

=== Peace Garden ===
The Peace Garden was created as a memorial to the atomic bombing of Hiroshima, as well as the "commitment of Torontonians to the principle of world peace." The sundial at the south end of the garden pre-dates the peace memorial; inscribed with the words "In appreciation of the opportunity to serve," it was originally installed in 1969, designed by G.R. Johnson (in consultation with H.H. Rogers and John C. Parkin), and presented by Nathan Phillips to the residents of Toronto. Fifteen years later, during the city's sesquicentennial, then Prime Minister of Canada Pierre Trudeau turned the first sod for the Peace Garden, which was to sit immediately north of, but also incorporate, the pre-existing sundial.

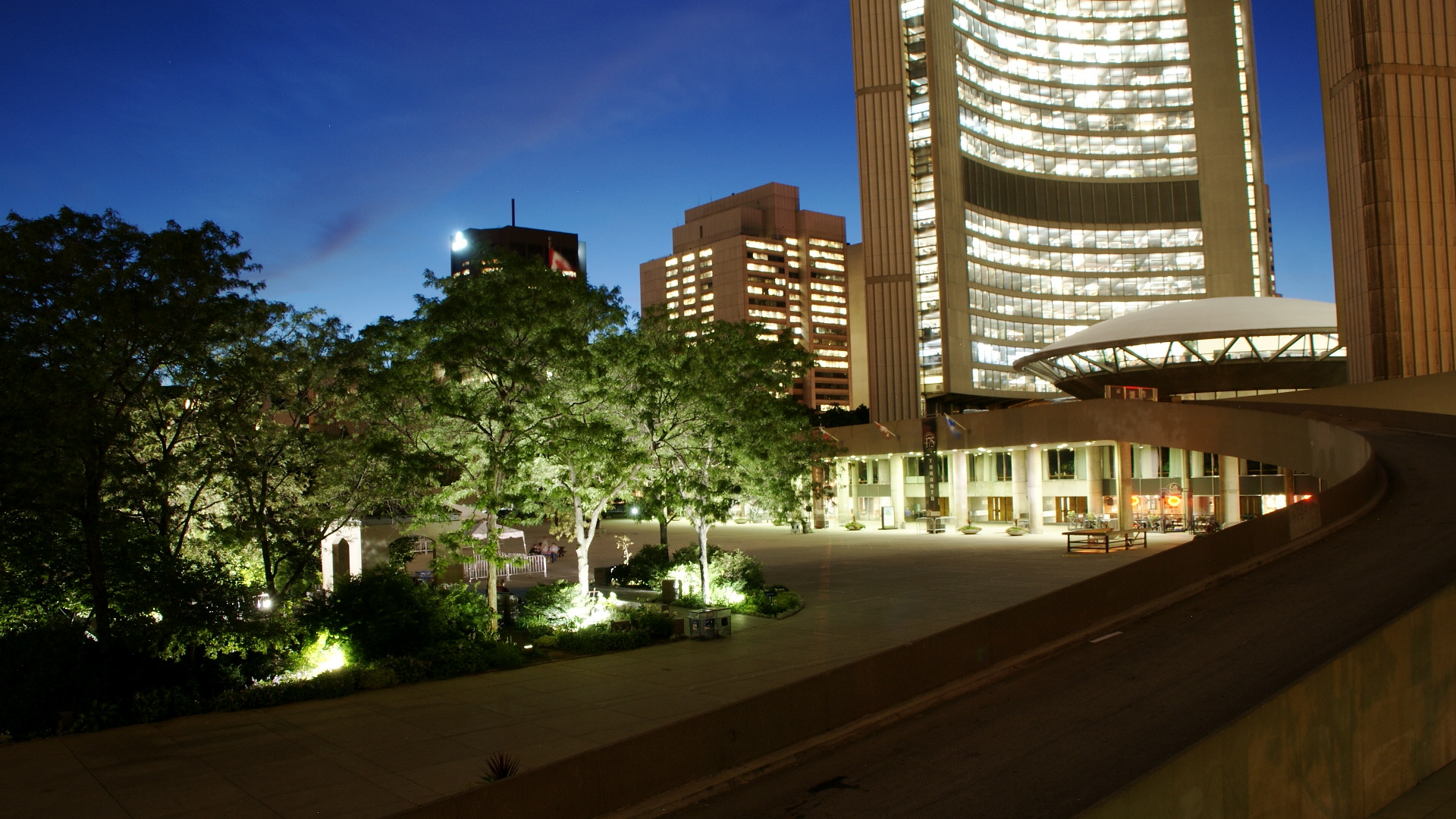
The Peace Garden at night

The 600 m^{2} (6,500 ft^{2}) garden consists of a pavilion, a fountain, and surrounding plantings. The gazebo is a stone-clad cube with arched openings on all sides, capped with a pitched roof, and with one corner of the structure deconstructed, to signify conflict and the fragility of civilization. The fountain's pool encroaches into this removed corner, with an eternal flame placed in the water so as to appear as though it supports the pavilion structure, to symbolize hope and regeneration. Pope John Paul II lit this flame with an ember from the Peace Flame in Hiroshima, and poured into the pool water from the rivers that flow through Nagasaki. The entire monument was formally dedicated by Elizabeth II, Queen of Canada, in October 1984. As part of the redesign of the square, the Peace Garden was moved from the centre of the square to its western edge.

=== Reflecting pool and skating rink ===
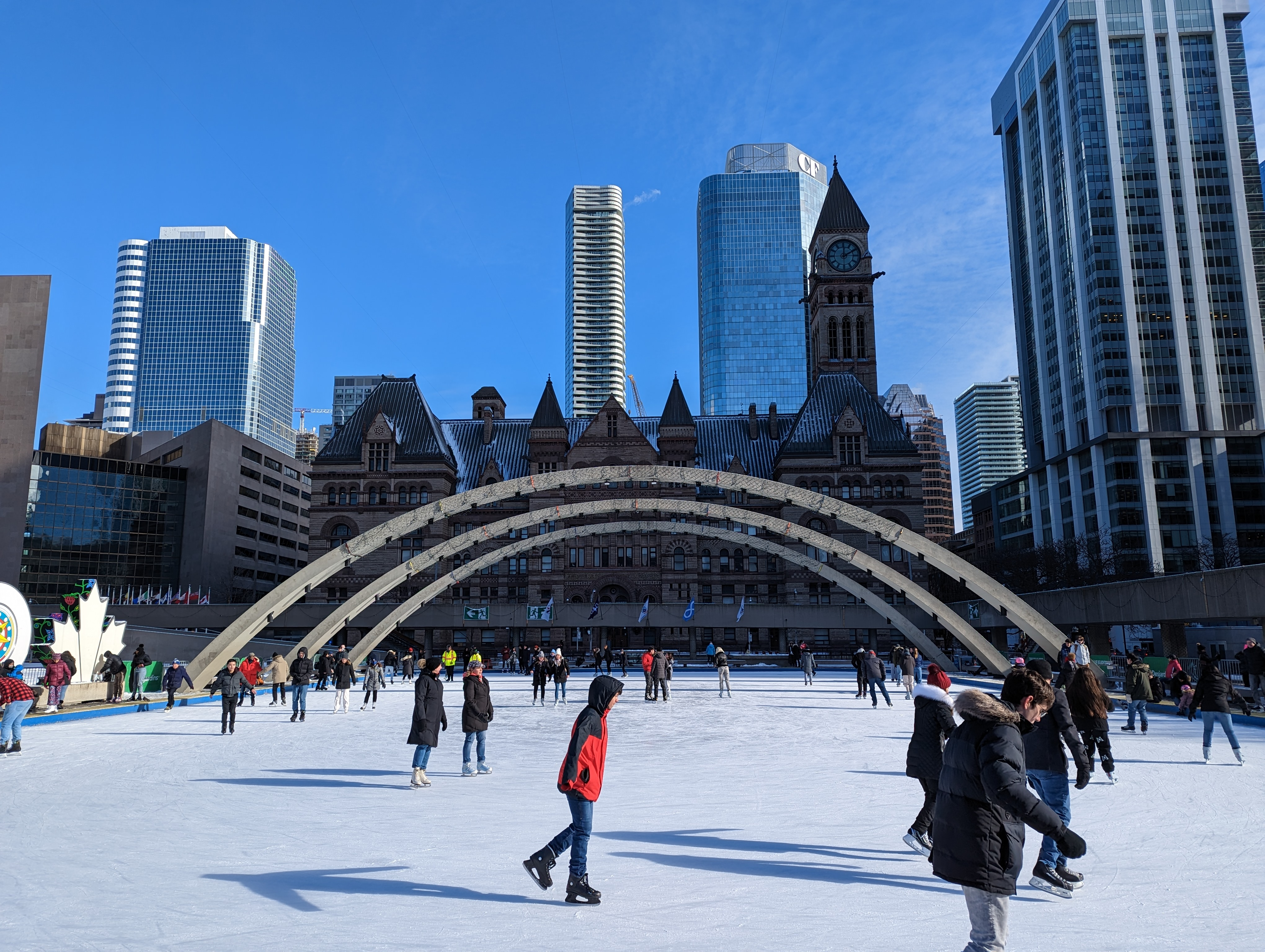
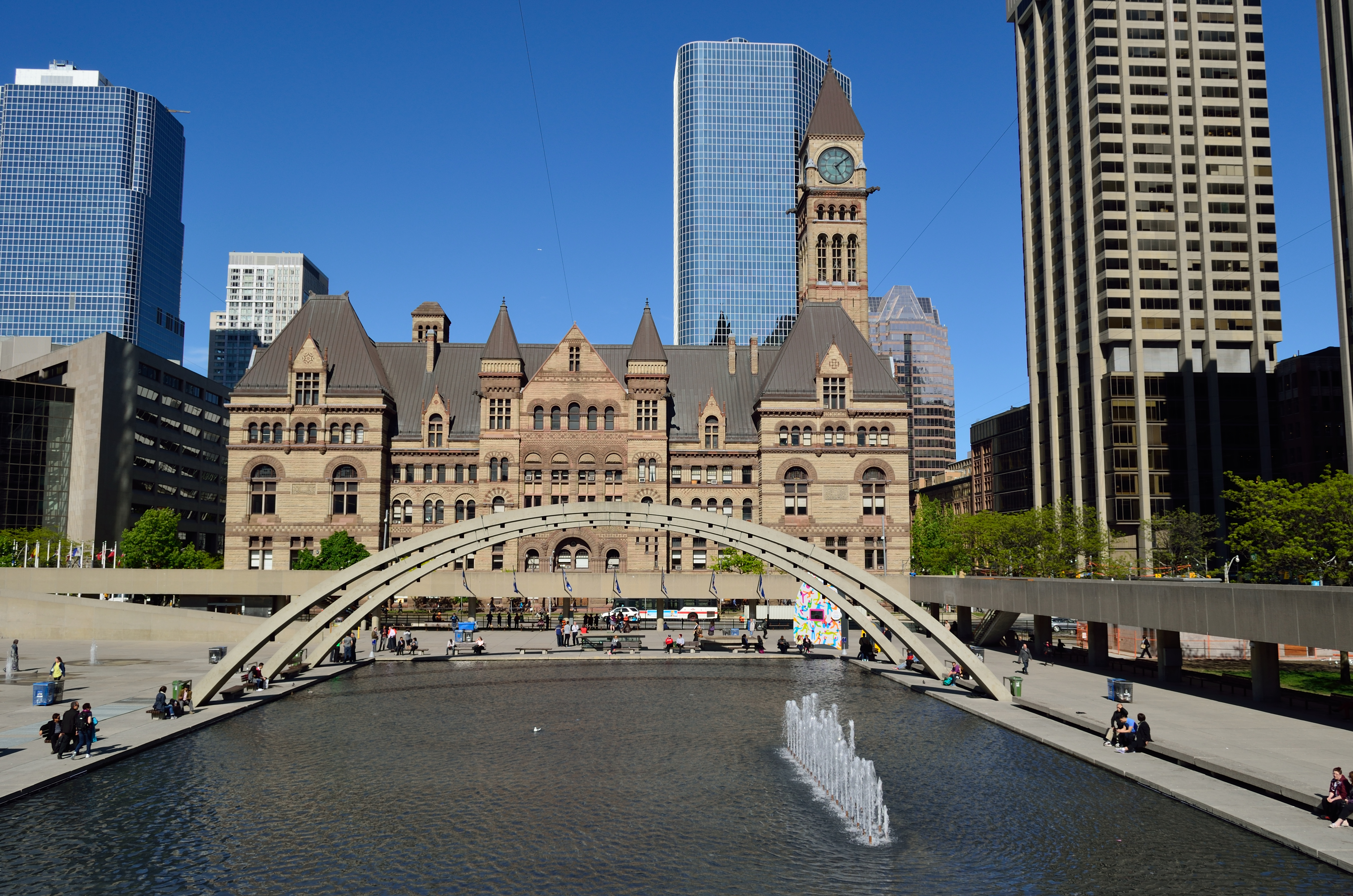
A reflecting pool that is also used as a skating rink in the winter is located in the southeast of the square

The reflecting pool is situated in the south-east corner of the square. Spanning the reflecting pool are three concrete arches; originally just an architectural feature and support for rink lighting, these were dedicated as the Freedom Arches in 1989, to commemorate those who fought to obtain or defend freedom. At the same time, a piece of the Berlin Wall was placed at the southern base of the central arch. To the west of the reflecting pool is a pavilion where food is available; and ice skates are available for rental during the winter months when the pool is used for ice skating.

=== Spirit Garden ===
A spirit garden was created in the square as part of the city's Truth and Reconciliation efforts. It contains a monument listing the 18 residential schools that existed in Ontario. There is a turtle sculpture that was created by Anishinaabe artist Solomon King. There is also artwork depicting the Three Sisters. Other installed features include a teaching lodge, inukshuk, spirit canoe, and wampum path.

== History ==
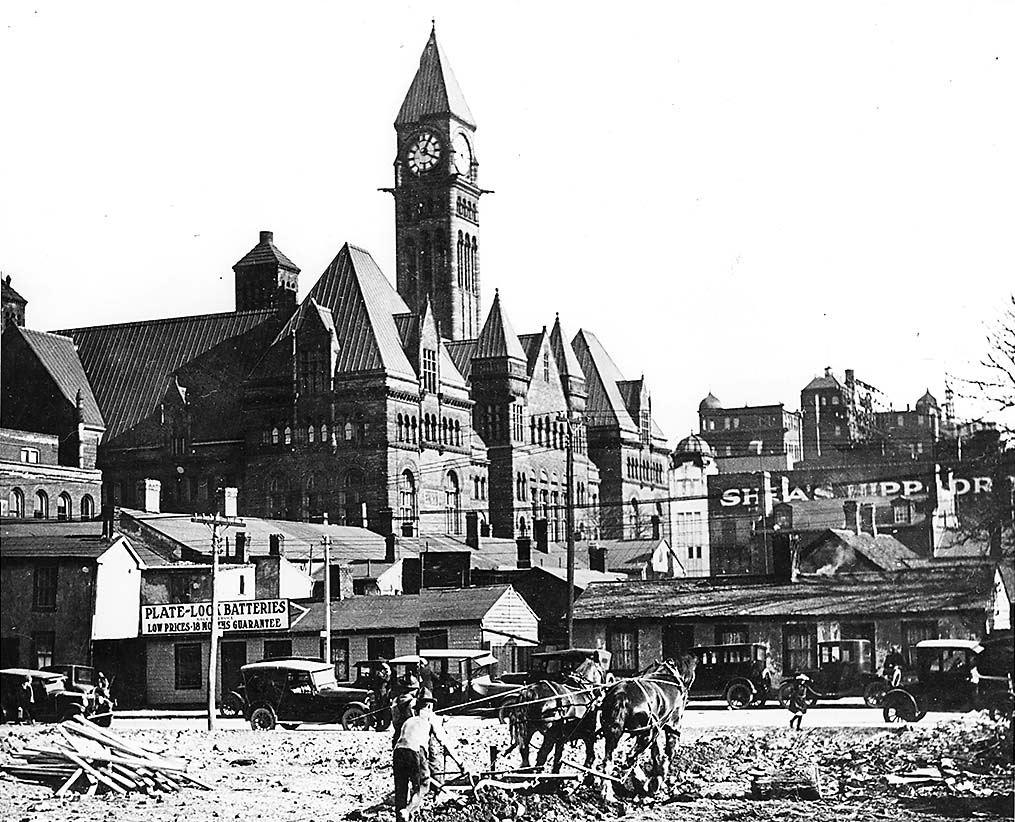
The future site of Nathan Phillips Square in 1918.

The area currently occupied by the square was part of the Ward and was a major immigrant reception area during the first half of the twentieth century characterized by poverty during the late 1800s and early 1900s, with Black families settling on the site followed by the large wave of Jewish immigrants from Eastern Europe during this period. From 1910s leading up to World War II, the immigrant neighbourhood was gradually settled and developed by the Chinese immigrants into Toronto's first Chinatown.

=== Development of the square and opening ===
Following World War II, the City of Toronto government prepared to construct a civic square in Chinatown, through a by-law which prohibited further development except for public purposes or parking lots. With voter approval in 1947, the city began acquisition of sites inside Chinatown from 1948 to 1958, with expropriation and demolition of various shops and restaurants in 1955 for the development of the square. With the procurement of the land completed and the design of City Hall finalized in 1958, construction commenced in 1961.

The south side of Queen Street opposite City Hall was considered a 'commercial slum' and in August 1964, Toronto City Council voted to expropriate the south side for development appropriate to the new civic square. The businesses on that side of the street included two burlesque theatres, pawn shops and a cinema. The south side was vacant at the time of the City Hall opening but was eventually occupied by a new hotel, connected by a pedestrian bridge over Queen Street to the square.

The rink was completed before other features in the square, and was officially opened by Mayor Philip Givens on 29 November 1964. This was also the first operational part of the new City Hall. It was rushed to completion before the December 1964 municipal election. Other dignitaries present that afternoon were former mayors Nathan Phillips and Allan Lamport. The rest of the square and City Hall was formally completed in September 1965.

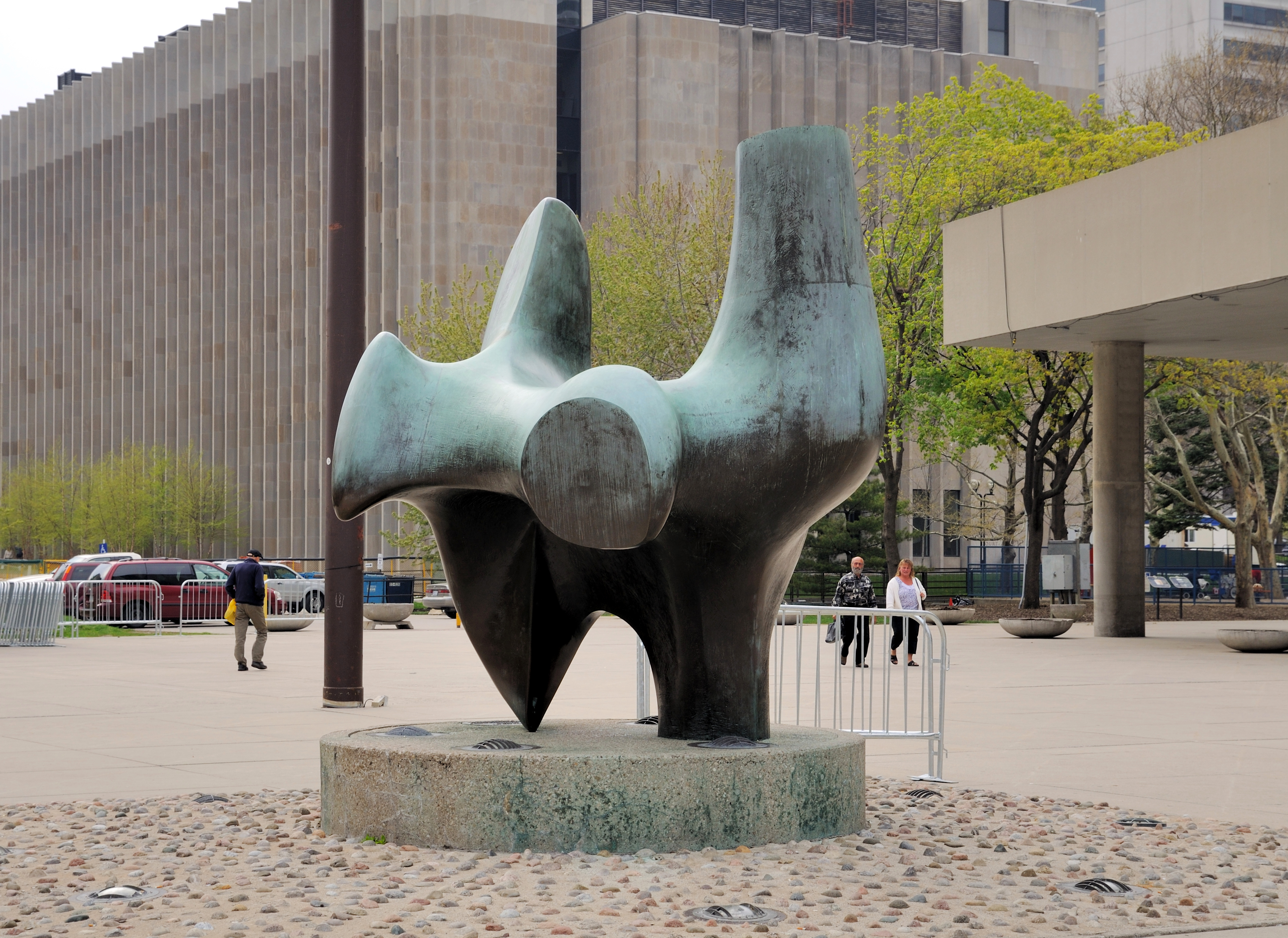
The Archer by Henry Moore, was installed in the square in 1966.

To add decoration to the square, City Hall architect Viljo Revell wanted a sculpture by British sculptor Henry Moore. He selected the Three-Way Piece No. 2 (The Archer) at a cost of over CA$100,000. Its purchase was controversial. Toronto Mayor Philip Givens was in favour of the purchase, but some objected to the cost and to the abstract design. The City Council rejected the purchase of the sculpture, but its purchase was funded by a public subscription fund, and the sculpture was installed in 1966.

After the 1972 Summit Series, the Canadian men's ice hockey win was feted with a public ceremony hosted by the mayor and the Ontario Premier.

Since the 1980s, the square has been used as the set for a number of films, such as The Kidnapping of the President, Resident Evil: Apocalypse, and The Sentinel. Khalsa Day is celebrated annually at the square with a day of music and food.

=== 21st century ===
A design competition was launched in the start of October 2006, soliciting proposals from forty-eight local and international firms for a revitalization of the square, and, on March 8, 2007, it was announced that the team led by PLANT Architect Inc. and Shore Tilbe Irwin + Partners (both of Toronto) had won the competition. The project was first estimated to cost CAD$45 million, but its final cost is expected to tally $60 million. Originally intended to be completed in 2012, the project is expected to be completed in 2014.

The design is based on the idea that Nathan Phillips Square has always acted as an agora, the ancient Athenian place of public and political exchange, with the design defining the concept of the open space of theatre and that of the public square – a theatre for the city, and a square surrounded by a forested perimeter.

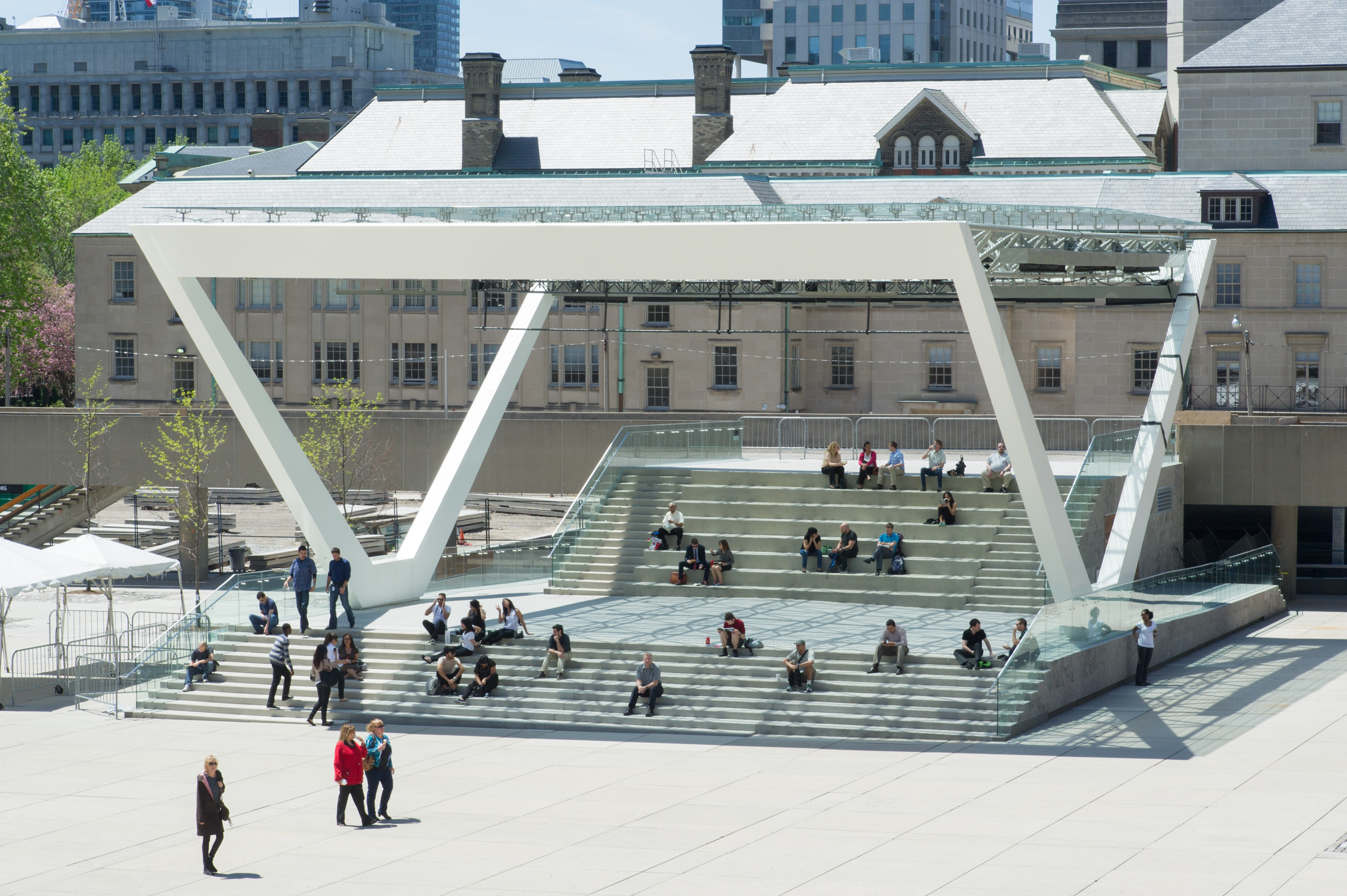
The square's stage was revitalized with a glazed roof canopy as a part of the municipal government's revitalization program for the square.

The plans included demolishing and replacing the food and skate rental kiosk, along with the addition of an upper level roof terrace overlooking the square; a two-level restaurant at the southwest corner of the square, with outdoor patio and terrace dining; a glass tourist information pavilion at the Queen and Bay Streets corner; a versatile stage structure under a glazed roof canopy; redesigned landscaping along the edges of the square that increases the number of trees, planting, mixed tree species; expansion and enhancement of the Peace Garden, with a flowering tree grove, eternal flame, and reflecting pool; landscaping and a café on the podium roof of City Hall; a restaurant and bar at the Observation Deck level of the east tower of City Hall; upgrading the overhead walkways with wood decking, seating, glass balustrades, light wells and improved access; and a seasonal disappearing water fountain in the centre of the square.

Sustainable design elements were also included so as to conform to Toronto's Green Standard, including a soil regeneration strategy, improved tree planting conditions, and increased biomass and number of trees; facilities for cyclists and the promotion of cycling; an improved pedestrian environment; the control of light pollution; energy efficient design; renewable energy features; opportunities for public education; attention to the on-site microclimate; and local sourcing of materials. The square redesign includes a CAD$1.2 million cycle station with storage for 380 bicycles and shower facilities. The cycle station was the cause of some minor controversy at Toronto City Council.

On May 29, 2010, Mayor David Miller officially opened the first phase of the Revitalization project: the Podium Green Roof Garden. The 1.1 hectares (2.7 acres) roof garden includes diverse plantings of sedums, perennials, and trees; a Central Courtyard beneath the Council Chamber; a Public Terrace at the southeast corner of the roof, shaded by a tree planter; benches and shade structures designed to reveal the movement of the sun; and a 500 metres (1,600 ft) perimeter path which acts as a walking and running circuit around the roof. New lighting has been installed, including new high-efficiency LED floodlights and a perimeter light band, to allow evening events to take place.

In 2011, after the death of federal New Democratic Party leader Jack Layton, citizens flocked to the square and covered the walls, pillars and statues with messages written in chalk for Layton and his family.

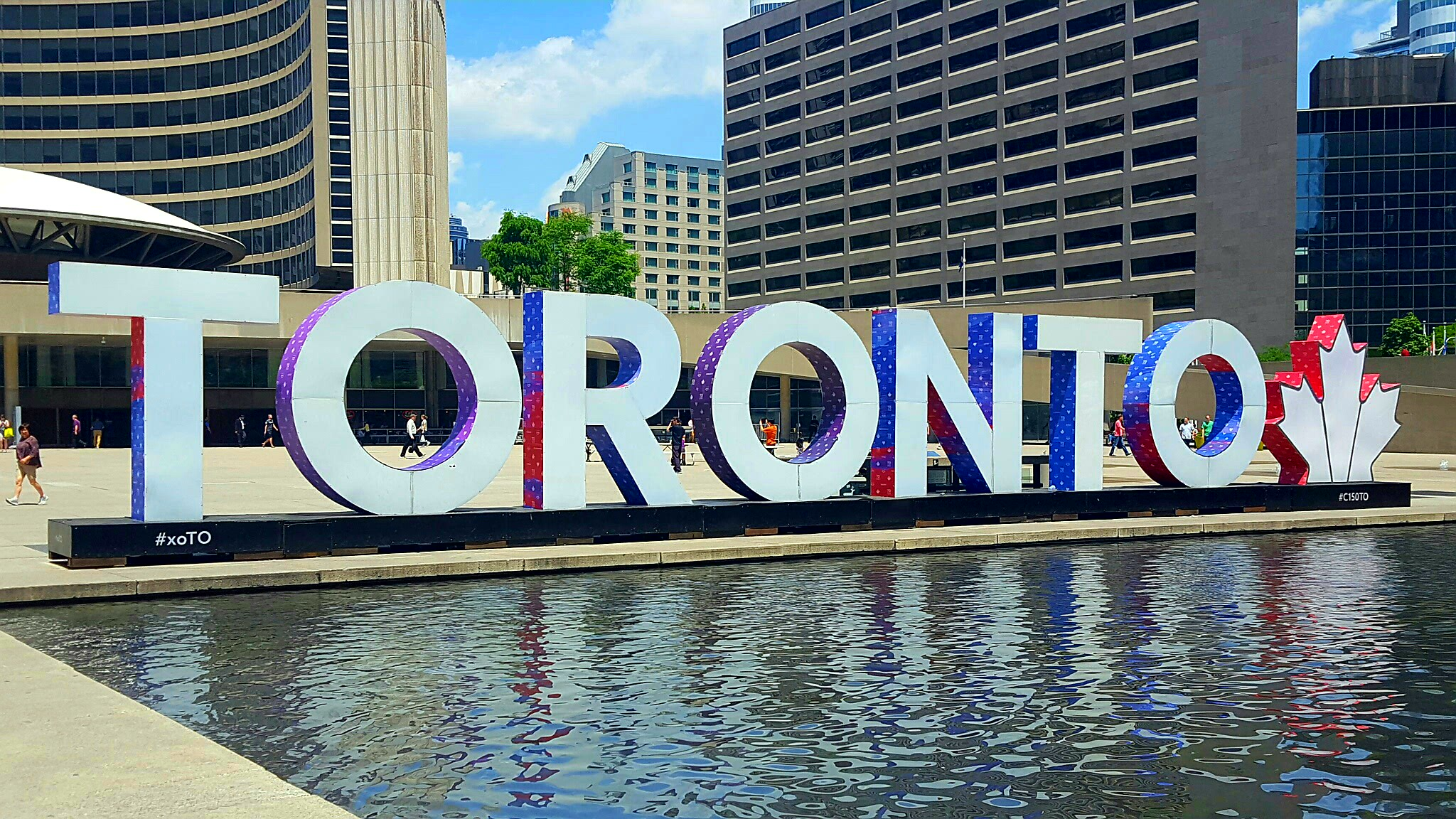
The Toronto sign was installed in the square in 2015

During the 2015 Pan American Games, Nathan Phillips Square was one of the sites of "Panamania", a cultural festival held in conjunction with the Games. Two temporary stages were installed and a platform for performances was installed over part of the reflecting pool. Each evening during the Games, the square was the site of musical concerts, a medal celebration and fireworks. The square also held a countdown clock for the Games, and a "pop-up" store for Pan-Am and Para-PanAm souvenirs.

A large, multi-colored-illuminated 3-D Toronto sign was also installed in the square for the Games; the sign quickly proved to be popular with locals and tourists alike. The sign was to be relocated elsewhere at the end of 2015, however on September 13, 2015, it was announced that the sign will remain in the square permanently.

The square was the host venue for the closing ceremonies of the 2015 Parapan American Games. Nathan Phillips Square was also a venue for Wheelchair tennis for the 2017 Invictus Games.

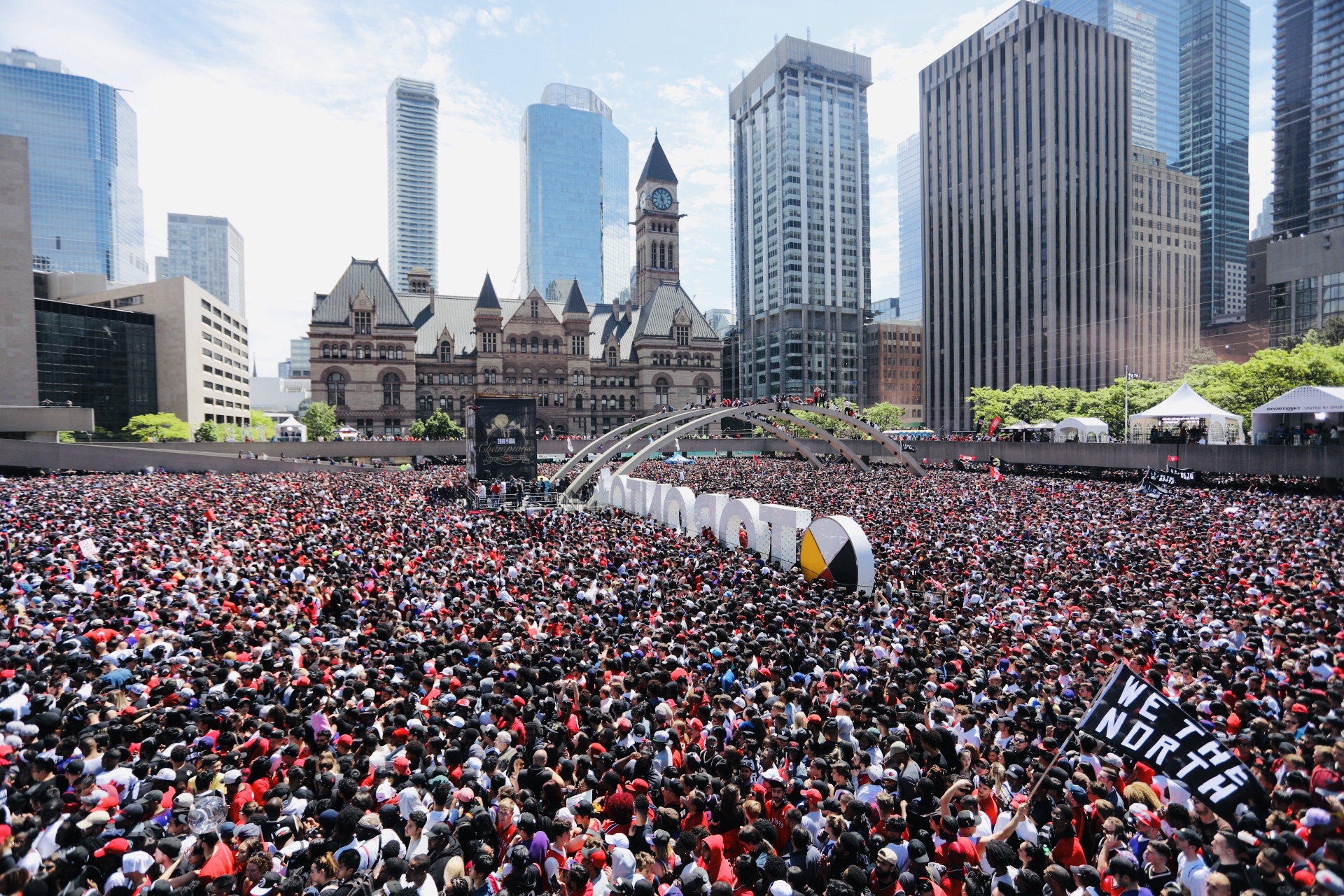
The square during the Toronto Raptors victory parade in June 2019

After the Toronto Raptors won the 2019 NBA Finals, the subsequent parade on June 17, 2019, in Toronto culminated at Nathan Phillips Square, with two million people in total attendance, the largest public gathering in one place for one event in Canadian history; a shooting broke out in a portion of the square where four people were shot and injured.

The square held a countdown clock for the 2026 FIFA World Cup, which Canada co-hosted.

== See also ==
- List of Toronto parks
- Albert Campbell Square
- Clarence Square
- Maple Leaf Square
- Mel Lastman Square
- Pecaut Square
- Sankofa Square
- Trinity Square (Toronto)
- Victoria Memorial Square
