= Celilo Fish Committee =

Fish Committee

The Celilo Fish Committee is a committee formed by representatives from the Yakama Nation of Washington.

== Description ==
The Celilo Fish Committee was formed and run by representatives from the Yakama Nation, Confederated Tribes of the Warm Springs Reservation, Confederated Tribes of the Umatilla Indian Reservation, and unenrolled river chiefs to govern fishing along the Columbia river in 1935 until 1957. They settled disputes among fishermen, protected Indian fishing rights, and regulated fish use by operating in a court-like manner. The Committee's power to settle these disputes came from the respect of the members involved. Collectively, the committee's twelve members shared responsibility for protecting and administering Indian fishing, promoting law and order at the fisheries, and prioritizing subsistence fishing ahead of commercial fishing. The Great Depression brought many challenges to the Celilo Indians when Congress authorized funding for the Dalles Dam.

The Yakama Nation, Confederated Tribes of the Warm Springs Reservation, and Confederated Tribes of the Umatilla Indian Reservation were granted treaty guaranteed fishing rights perpetually in 1855. The location of Celilo Falls was outside the boundaries of the adjacent Indian reservations that were guaranteed fishing access which caused its status under the law to be ambiguous. Groups, including the treatied tribal members, those of the area of Native Americans, and white people negotiated for access to the waters and sold the fish they caught to a cannery. During Salmon season, up to 5,000 fishers could be gathered at once. Although chaotic, they still cooperated in a type of “market governed by custom.” Infrastructure consisted of “jerry-rigged platforms'' that fishers stood upon and used nets to scoop up fish. Today, Columbia River tribes commercially harvest chinook salmon at 1.5 percent the levels compared to 1855. Indiscriminate logging, careless farming methods, and over reliance on hatcheries are factors that lead to fish decline.

== History ==
A new fish committee to control fishing regulations among Indians was recommended in a 1934 Celilo meeting. This recommendation turned into the Celilo Fish Committee in 1935 when the Bureau of Indian Affairs approved its constitution and by-laws. Celilo Falls was an important center for native trade, culture, and ceremony. For thousands of years, Pacific Northwest Indians fished, bartered, socialized, and honored their ancestors at Celilo Falls, part of a nine-mile stretch of the Long Narrows on the Columbia River. Celilo Falls disappeared under the backwaters of The Dalles dam in March 1957.
