= Sun Dance =

Ceremony practiced by some Indigenous people in North America

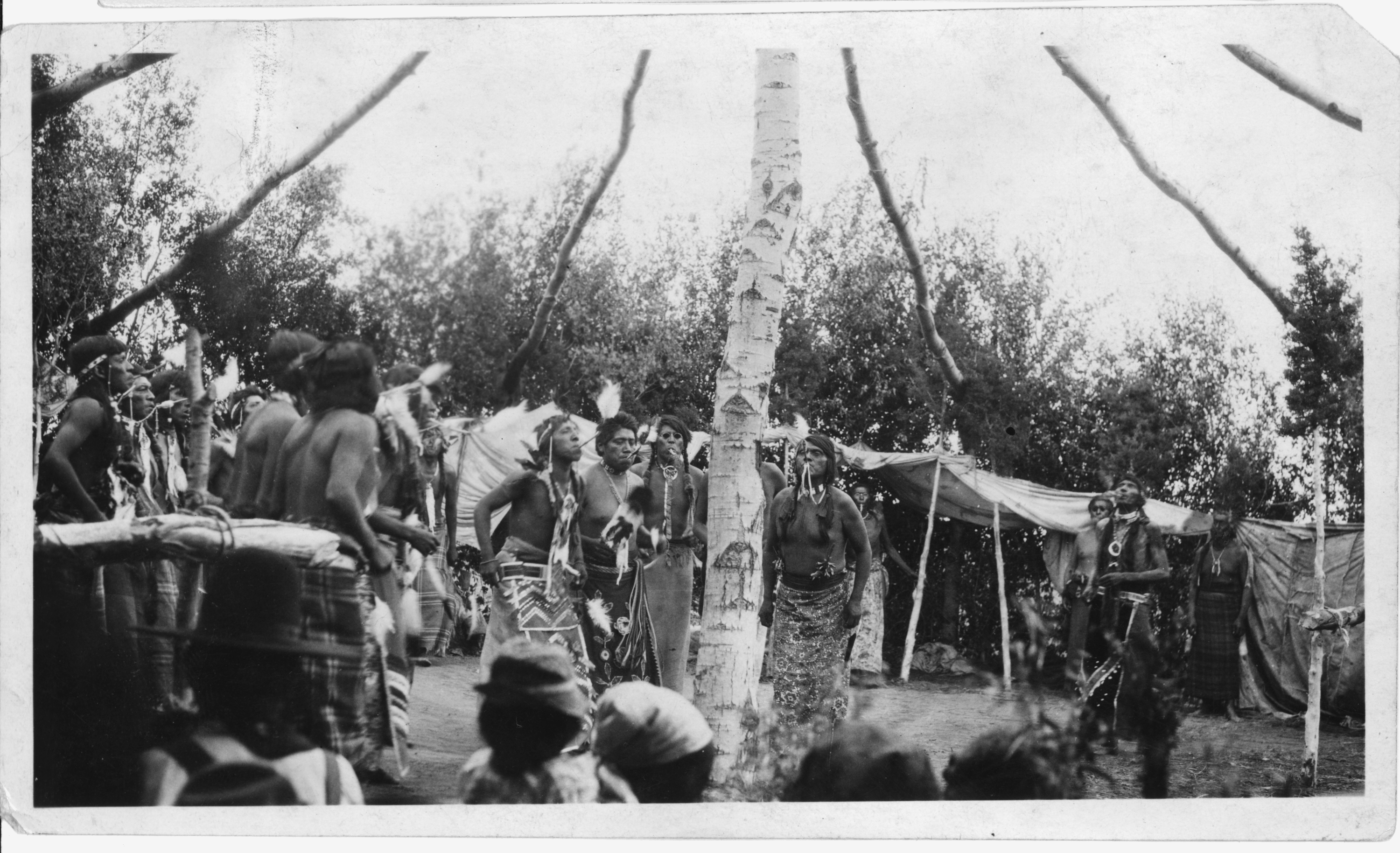
Sun dance, Shoshone at Fort Hall, 1925

The Sun Dance is a ceremony practiced by some Native Americans in the United States and Indigenous peoples in Canada, primarily those of the Plains cultures, as well as a new movement within Native American religions. Members of otherwise independent bands gather to reaffirm beliefs about the world and the supernatural through rituals of personal and community sacrifice. Typically, young men would dance semi-continuously for several days and nights without eating or drinking; in some cultures, self-mortification was or is currently also practiced.

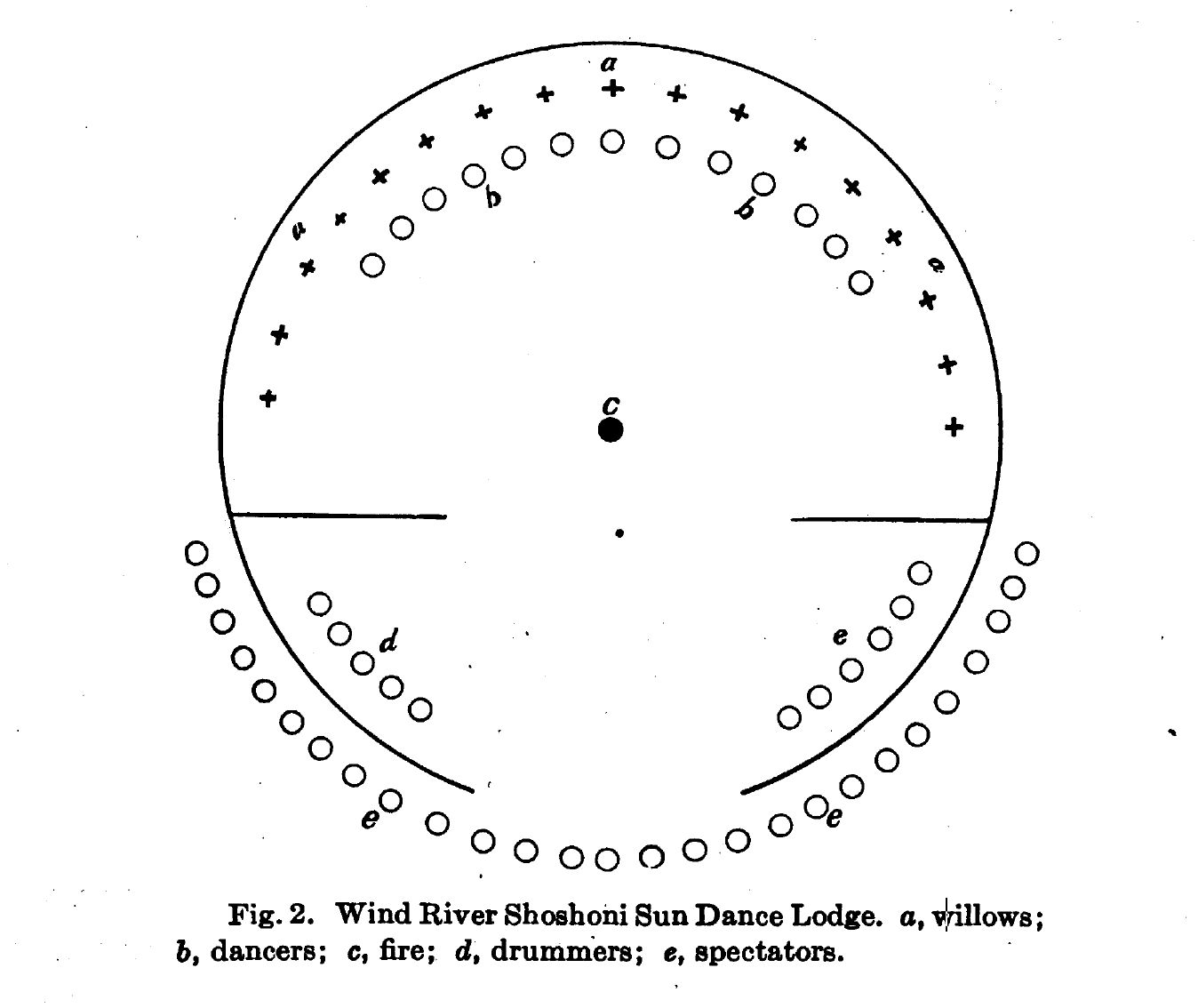
Diagram of an Eastern Shoshone Sun Dance lodge.

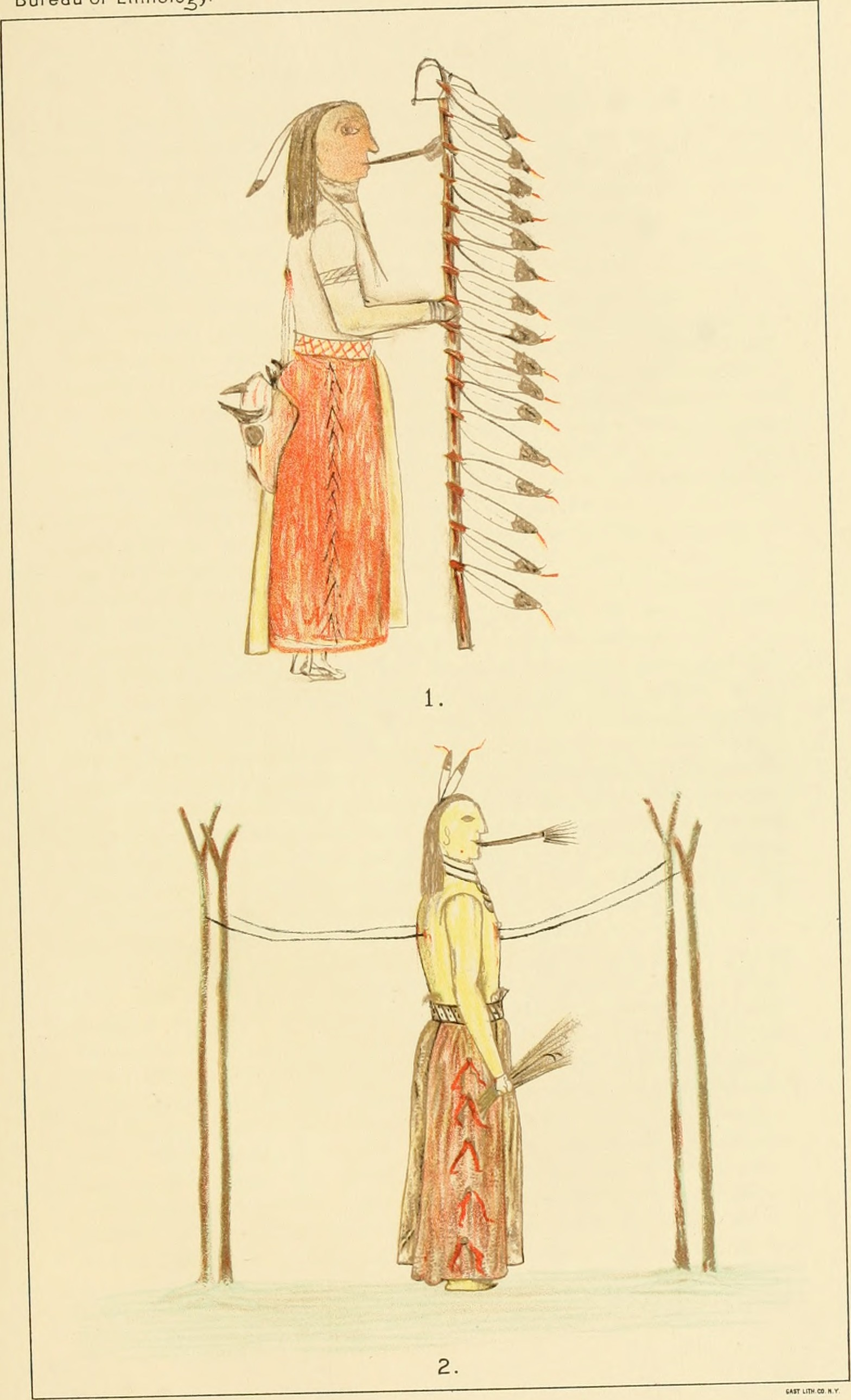
1889 drawing of Sun Dance participants; note the leather thongs tying the dancer to the stakes.

After European colonization of the Americas, and with the formation of the Canadian and United States governments, both countries passed laws intended to suppress Indigenous cultures and force assimilation into Christianity and majority-Anglo-American culture. The Sun Dance was one of the prohibited ceremonies, as was the potlatch of the Pacific Northwest peoples. An attenuated form was practiced after Canada lifted its prohibition against the practice of the full ceremony in 1951. In the United States, Congress passed the American Indian Religious Freedom Act (AIRFA) in 1978, which was enacted to protect basic civil liberties, and to protect and preserve the traditional religious rights and cultural practices of Native Americans, Eskimos, Aleuts, and Native Hawaiians.

== Description ==
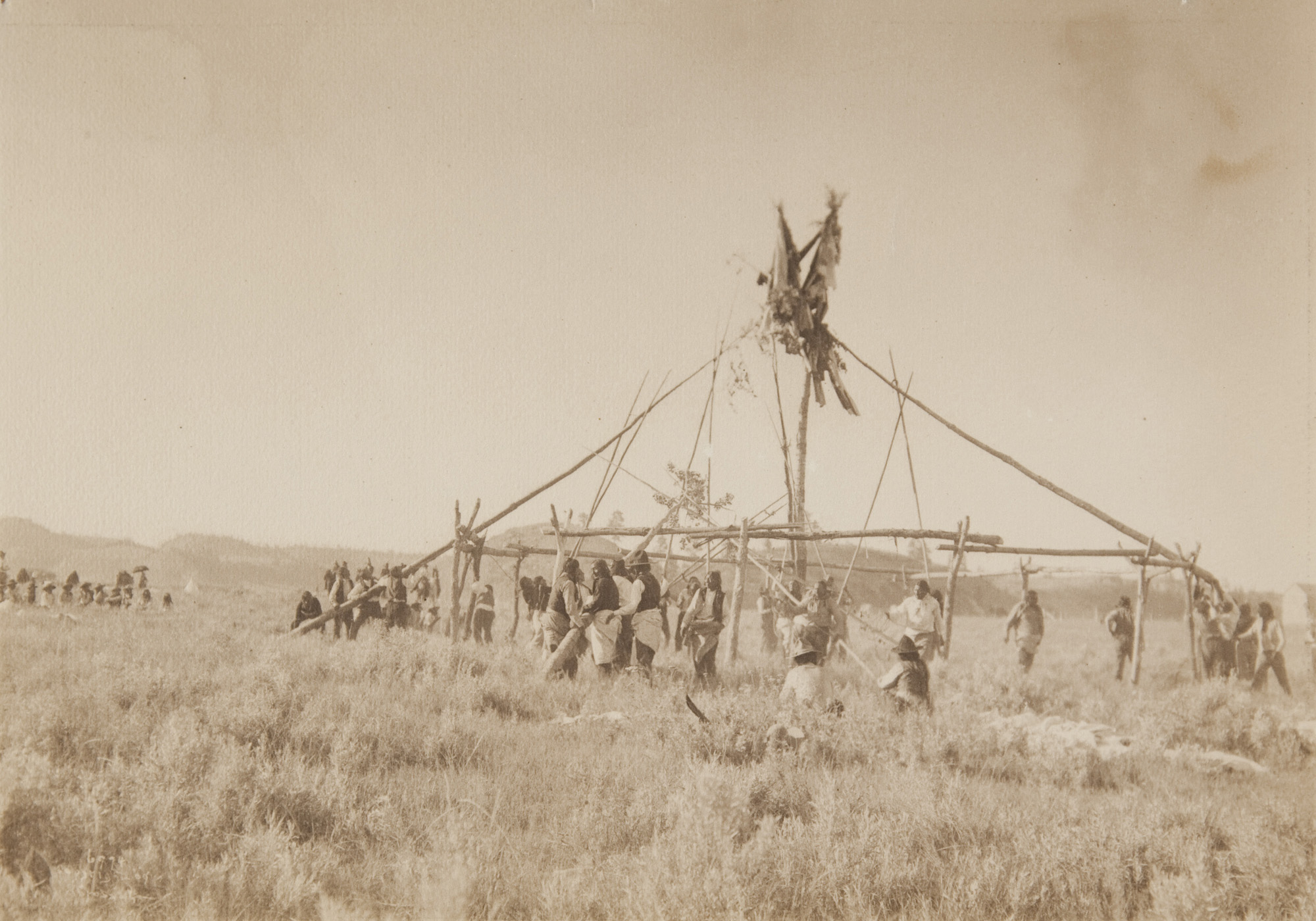
Placing the clan poles, c. 1910.

Several features are common to the ceremonies held by Sun Dance cultures. These include dances and songs passed down through many generations, the use of a traditional drum, a sacred fire, praying with a ceremonial pipe, fasting from food and water before participating in the dance, and, in some cases, the ceremonial piercing of skin and trials of physical endurance. Certain plants are picked and prepared for use during the ceremony, such as Artemisia ludoviciana (white sage), which the Lakota use to make bracelets.

Typically, the Sun Dance is a grueling ordeal for the dancers, a physical and spiritual test that they offer in sacrifice for their people. According to the Oklahoma Historical Society, young men dance around a pole to which they are fastened by "rawhide thongs pegged through the skin of their chests." Piercing was accomplished using skewers or piercing needles through a small fold of skin on the upper chest or back; leather was then used to attach a bison skull or other heavy weight to the skewers. A dancer would dance while bearing the weight until he collapsed or the skin was torn loose.

At most ceremonies, family members and friends stay in the surrounding camp and pray in support of the dancers. Communities plan and organize for at least a year to prepare for the ceremony. Usually, one leader or a small group of leaders is in charge of the ceremony, but many elders help out and advise.

== Canada ==
The Government of Canada, through the Department of Indian Affairs (now Crown–Indigenous Relations and Northern Affairs Canada), persecuted Sun Dance practitioners and attempted to suppress the dance. Indian agents, based on directives from their superiors, routinely interfered with, discouraged, and disallowed sun dances in many Canadian plains communities from 1882 until the 1940s.

The Canadian government outlawed "any celebration or dance of which the wounding or mutilation of the dead or living body of any human being or animal forms a part or is a feature" in an 1895 amendment to the Indian Act. Anyone who engaged, assisted or encouraged (either directly or indirectly) was liable to imprisonment. Though not all nations' Sun Dances include the body piercings, the amendment legally prohibited its performance for those communities that did.

It is unclear how often this law was actually enforced; in at least one instance, police are known to have given their permission for the ceremony to be conducted. The First Nations people simply conducted many ceremonies quietly and in secret. Sun dance practitioners, such as the Plains Cree, Saulteaux, and Blackfoot, continued to hold sun dances throughout the persecution period. Some practiced the dance in secret, others with permissions from their agents, and others without the body piercing.

In 1951, government officials amended the Indian Act, dropping the prohibition against practices of flesh-wounding.

== Contemporary practices ==
The Sun Dance is a living tradition practiced annually in many Native communities in Canada and the U.S. The Cree and Saulteaux have conducted at least one Rain Dance (with similar elements) each year since 1890 somewhere on the Canadian Plains.

In 1993, responding to what they believed was a frequent desecration of the Sun Dance and other Lakota sacred ceremonies, US and Canadian Lakota, Dakota and Nakota nations held "the Lakota Summit V". It was an international gathering of about 500 representatives from 40 different peoples and bands of the Lakota. They unanimously passed the following 'Declaration of War Against Exploiters of Lakota Spirituality':

"Whereas sacrilegious "sundances" for non-Indians are being conducted by charlatans and cult leaders who promote abominable and obscene imitations of our sacred Lakota sundance rites; ... We hereby and henceforth declare war against all persons who persist in exploiting, abusing, and misrepresenting the sacred traditions and spiritual practices of the Lakota, Dakota and Nakota people." - Mesteth, Wilmer, et al (1993)

In 1995, efforts to continue practicing the ceremony on a tract of unceded Secwepemc land led to an armed confrontation known as the Gustafsen Lake standoff.

In 2003, the 19th-Generation Keeper of the Sacred White Buffalo Calf Pipe of the Lakota asked non-Native people to stop attending the Sun Dance (Wi-wayang-wa-c'i-pi in Lakota); he stated that all can pray in support, but that only Native people should approach the altars. This statement was supported by keepers of sacred bundles and traditional spiritual leaders from the Cheyenne and Sioux who issued a proclamation that non-Native people would be banned from sacred altars and the Seven Sacred Rites, including and especially the sun dance, effective March 9, 2003 onward:

The Wi-wanyang-wa-c'i-pi (Sundance Ceremony): The only participants allowed in the centre will be Native People. The non-Native people need to understand and respect our decision. If there have been any unfinished commitments to the Sun Dance and non-Natives have concerns for this decision, they must understand that we have been guided through prayer to reach this resolution. Our purpose for the Sun Dance is for the survival of the future generations to come, first and foremost. If the non-Natives truly understand this purpose, they will also understand this decision and know that by their departure from this Ho-c'o-ka (our sacred altar) is their sincere contribution to the survival of our future generations.

== Ascetic elements and symbolism ==
The Sun Dance includes pronounced ascetic practices that carry deep spiritual meaning in Plains Indigenous cultures. Participants voluntarily engage in physical sacrifice—such as fasting, piercing, and dancing for extended periods—as acts of prayer and devotion for the benefit of the wider community. These rituals reflect values of endurance, humility, and the renewal of life through sacrificial offering.

Across Sun Dance traditions, one of the core ascetic elements is fasting from both food and water for several days, usually within a sacred circular arbor centered on a cottonwood pole. This fast is not only a physical test but a spiritual discipline aimed at purification and focus. Anthropologist Alice Kehoe explains that dancers "embody the strength of their people" through physical exertion that reaffirms communal bonds and relationships with the sacred realm. Ethnographer Ruth Underhill described the Sun Dance as a "rite of renewal" in which participants submit their bodies to intense trials as offerings to the Creator.

In many Sun Dance ceremonies—particularly among the Lakota, Cheyenne, and Arapaho—piercing plays a central role. Dancers have wooden skewers inserted through the skin of their chests or backs, which are then attached to thongs connected either to the sacred center pole or to heavy objects like buffalo skulls. As the dance progresses, the participants lean back or pull against the tethering until the skin tears free. James R. Walker’s early 20th-century account records this moment as the culmination of the dancer’s vow: “to offer up [his] body and soul for the sake of the people.” The tearing of flesh is interpreted not as masochistic pain but as a gift of life force to the Creator and the community.

Ethnographer Ella Cara Deloria, a Dakota Sioux scholar, described how these practices were prepared for with purification rituals such as sweat baths and vision quests. She emphasized that the Sun Dance “signified not punishment, but the ultimate offering—of one’s own body in thanks or petition.” Black Elk, the renowned Oglala Lakota holy man, explained the spiritual logic of the dance to Joseph Epes Brown: “Here underneath you [the sacred tree] I shall offer up my body and soul for the sake of the people… For the good of the people it must be done.” The center pole in the Sun Dance lodge represents the axis mundi—the world center—symbolizing a connection between the earthly realm and the divine. The circular lodge around it is constructed to reflect the universe, with its 28 posts often symbolizing lunar cycles or cosmic balance.

Not all communities practiced piercing, but nearly all emphasized the value of personal endurance and sacrifice. The Plains Cree, for instance, developed a related “Thirst Dance” in which dancers fasted from water and performed strenuous movements around the sacred pole without undergoing piercing. Similarly, among the Shoshoni, the dance focused on prolonged fasting and spiritual seeking through exhaustion rather than self-wounding, though the underlying themes of offering and communion with the divine remained the same.

Contemporary interpretations emphasize the ethical and communal dimensions of these practices. Fritz Detwiler has argued that the willingness to sacrifice physical comfort in the Sun Dance creates a “moral community” rooted in reciprocity, courage, and prayerful intention. Arthur Amiotte, a Lakota artist-scholar, notes that these physical trials are expressions of intergenerational responsibility: dancers suffer not for individual gain, but “for the survival of the future generations to come.”

While non-Indigenous interpretations have sometimes misunderstood these practices as extreme or exotic, Indigenous scholars and elders assert that they are integral expressions of Plains cosmology. The ascetic disciplines in the Sun Dance are less about punishment than about intentional sacrifice—an embodied prayer to restore harmony within the sacred hoop of life.

== Filming ==
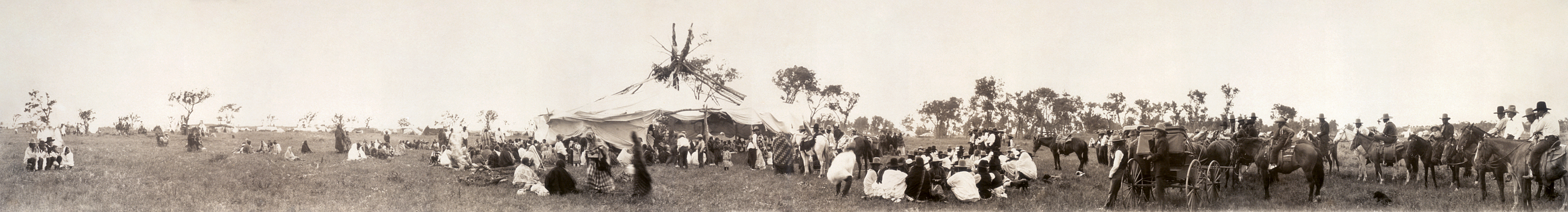
A Cheyenne Sun Dance gathering, c. 1909.

In most Sun Dance cultures, it is forbidden to film ceremony or prayer. Few images exist of authentic ceremonies. Many First Nations people believe that when money or cameras enter, the spirits leave, so no photo conveys an authentic ceremony. To much disdain, the Kainai Nation in Alberta permitted filming of their Sun Dance in the late 1950s for the sake of its preservation. This was released as the documentary Circle of the Sun (1960), produced by the National Film Board of Canada. Manitoba archival photos show that the ceremonies have been consistently practiced since at least the early 1900s.

== See also ==
- Great Race (Native American legend)
- Ohuokhai Dance, carried out by the Sakha people around Midsummer and tied to a solar deity
