= Pan-Indianism =

Philosophical and political approach promoting Native American unity

Pan-Indianism is a philosophical and political approach promoting unity and, to some extent, cultural homogenization among different Indigenous groups in the Americas regardless of tribal distinctions and cultural differences.

This approach to political organizing is primarily associated with Native Americans organizing for social justice and cultural revitalization in the Continental United States but has spread to some other Indigenous communities as well, especially in Canada. Inuit and Métis people may consider themselves part of the broader pan-Aboriginal community or some variation thereof. Some academics have also used the term pan-Amerindianism to distinguish from other peoples known as "Indians." Some pan-Indian organizations seek to pool the resources of Native groups to protect the interests of indigenous peoples across the world.

== Early history ==
Tecumseh's Confederacy is considered to be an early example of Pan-Indianism. As a confederation founded on the premise of indigenous unity against American expansionism, it united many of the tribes of the Great Lakes region. At the meeting between Tecumseh and then governor of the Indiana Territory, William Henry Harrison at Vincennes, Tecumseh called for collective ownership of land, arguing that the land belonged to everyone.

In 1912, members of the Creek, Choctaw, Cherokee, and Chickasaw tribes, united by their opposition to Allotment, formed the Four Mothers Society for collective political action. Also, in 1912, the Alaskan Native Brotherhood and Sisterhood came together, centering on their shared interest in protecting Native resources. In 1934, Congress passed the Indian Reorganization Act, which reversed assimilation and allotment policies. This act granted "legal sanction to tribal landholdings; returned unsold allotted lands to tribes; made provisions for the purchase of new lands; encouraged tribal constitutions, systems of justice, and business corporations; expanded educational opportunities through new facilities and loans ...; advocated the hiring of Indians by the Office of Indian Affairs ...; extended the Indian Trust Status; and granted Indians Religious Freedom."

== Key events ==
Before there were successful national and continental organizations, there were several regional bodies that united multiple nations (tribes or bands) within the context of post-settlement politics. The Grand General Indian Council of Ontario was organized with missionary assistance in the 1870s and persisted until 1938. Likewise, the Allied Tribes of British Columbia were created in 1916.

In 1911, the first national Indian political organization in the US was created, the Society of American Indians. This organization pursued such things as better Indian educational programs and improved living conditions. This was paralleled by the establishment of the League of Indians of Canada in 1919, Canada's first Aboriginal organization that was national in scope.

The Society of American Indians was the most influential of the early pan-Indian organizations. It played a critical role in advocating Indian citizenship, which was finally granted by the Indian Citizenship Act of 1924.

Before World War II and throughout the 1940s and '50s, Native activism was less developed and for the most part non-violent. Many leaders made a genuine effort to work with the American government. In 1923, as a symbolic gesture, Deskaheh, a Cayuga chief, traveled to the League of Nations in Geneva in hopes of obtaining recognition of his tribe's sovereignty, but his request was denied. In 1939, the Tonawanda Band of the Seneca tribe issued a "Declaration of Independence" to the state of New York. It was ignored, and natives who broke state law were arrested. In other cases, American Indian tribes struggled to maintain their sovereignty over tribal land that had been granted to them by treaties with the federal government. Unrelated Native American groups, and Americans in general, began to notice and sympathize with their aims.

For one week in June 1961, 420 American Indians from 67 tribes convened for the American Indian Chicago Conference held at the University of Chicago. After exchanging opinions that covered many aspects of Indian affairs, the Declaration of Indian Purpose was drafted.

In 1989, the Indigenous and Tribal Peoples Convention, also known as the International Labour Organization's (ILO) Convention No. 169, occurred. To date, this has been the only formally binding international convention that specifically applies to indigenous peoples. The conference recognized the goal of native groups to maintain their position as entities independent of national governments.

== Organizations ==
=== Alaska Native Brotherhood/Sisterhood ===
The Alaska Native Brotherhood and Sisterhood was founded in 1912 with a goal of protecting Native resources.

=== All Indian Pueblo Council ===
The All Indian Pueblo Council, founded in 1922, successfully opposed the proposed Bursum Bill, which legislated rights for squatters on Native grounds along the Rio Grande. The All Indian Pueblo Council declared that Pueblo Indians had lived in a "civilized condition" long before European Americans came over to America. They appealed to public morality by claiming to have pride in their past. The All Pueblo Council needed public support to help preserve lands, customs, and traditions and to turn their interest to the Pueblo tribes so they could gain assistance in court.

=== American Indian Movement ===
Flag of the American Indian Movement

The American Indian Movement was created in 1968 in Minneapolis by Dennis Banks, George Mitchell, and Clyde Bellecourt (all Ojibwe), and Russell Means (Lakota). AIM became well known for its involvement in the Wounded Knee incident in 1973 and the seizure of the Bureau of Indian Affairs in 1972. Inspired by groups like The Black Panthers, AIM took a new, more radical approach than had previous Native groups, using direct action at protests and arguing for liberation instead of assimilation. They advocated for the abolition of the Office of Indian Affairs (which was promoting assimilation). They mobilized many people to become activists and quickly became the most visible of the pan-Indian organizations of the era.

=== Assembly of First Nations ===
Founded in 1967, the Assembly of First Nations (AFN), formerly known as the National Indian Brotherhood, is a representative body of First Nations leaders in Canada. The aims of the organization are to protect the rights, treaty obligations, ceremonies, and claims of citizens of the First Nations in Canada. It represents the majority of all First Nations governments or "band councils" in Canada and has a leader known as the National Chief.

=== Association on American Indian Affairs ===
The Association on American Indian Affairs (AAIA) aims to improve Native American health, education, and economic and community development while maintaining tradition, culture, and language. Protecting Native American sovereignty, natural resources, and constitutional, legal, and human rights is also included in their mission.

=== Black Hills Treaty Council ===
The Black Hills Treaty Council was established in South Dakota in 1911 on the Cheyenne River Sioux reservation to prepare a suit in the U.S. Court of Claims.

=== Columbia River Inter-Tribal Fish Commission ===
The Columbia River Inter-Tribal Fish Commission (CRITFC) was created in 1977 by four tribes—the Nez Perce, Umatilla, Warm Springs, and Yakama—to "renew their authority in fisheries management." Their mission also includes protecting treaty rights for fishing guaranteed by treaties with the federal government "through the exercise of the inherent sovereign powers of the tribes.".

"For generations, traditional fishing authorities governed tribal communities on the Columbia River. One such authority was the old Celilo Fish Committee. The authority exercised by the Celilo Fish Committee was derived from the sovereign powers of the people living and fishing in nearby tribal territories. The committee ordained fishing practices that were disciplined and designed to serve a high purpose: to ensure that the salmon resource was served first—even worshipped—so that it would flourish and always exist."

=== Congress of Aboriginal Peoples ===
The Congress of Aboriginal Peoples] (CAP) founded in 1971 as the Native Council of Canada, is a Canadian aboriginal organization, that represents Aboriginal Peoples (First Nations and Métis) who live off Indian reserves, either in urban and rural areas across Canada.

Each CAP affiliate has its own constitution and is separately funded under the federal Aboriginal Representative Organization Program (AROP). CAP's bylaws require affiliation to be limited to one organization per province or territory. In effect, these affiliates are the corporate members of CAP, which does not, itself, have individual memberships.

=== Indian Defense League of America ===
The Indian Defense League of America was founded in 1926 by Chief Clinton Rickard of the Tuscarora "to promote unrestricted travel across the international border between the United States and Canada." Indigenous people consider unrestricted travel across the continental United States and across the border between the United States and Canada an inherent right given by the Jay Treaty of 1794 and reconfirmed by the Treaty of Ghent of 1814. The Annual Border Crossing sponsored by the League begins at Niagara Falls.

=== International Indian Treaty Council ===
The International Indian Treaty Council (IITC) has an objective to seek, promote, and build participation of Indigenous Peoples in the United Nations (UN) and its specialized agencies, as well as other international forums.

- To seek international recognition for Treaties and Agreements between Indigenous Peoples and Nation-States.
- To support the human rights, self-determination and sovereignty of Indigenous Peoples; to oppose colonialism in all its forms and its effects upon Indigenous Peoples.
- To build solidarity and relationships of mutual support among Indigenous Peoples of the world.
- To disseminate information about Indigenous Peoples' human rights issues, struggles, concerns and perspectives.
- To establish and maintain one or more organizational offices to carry out IITC's information dissemination, networking and human rights programs.

=== Inter-Tribal Environmental Council ===
The Inter-Tribal Environmental Council (ITEC) was set up in 1992 to protect the health of Native Americans, their natural resources and their environment. To accomplish this, ITEC provides technical support, training, and environmental services in a variety of disciplines. Currently, there are over forty ITEC member tribes in Oklahoma, New Mexico, and Texas.

The ITEC office has a full-time staff of twenty-two who organize and provide services to the individual ITEC member tribes. In addition, they assist individual tribes with other environmentally related issues and concerns as they arise.

=== Leonard Peltier Defense Committee ===
The LPDC is a national and international support group working to free Leonard Peltier (Anishinabe and Dakota/Lakota), a man who is serving two life sentences at the Leavenworth Federal Penitentiary in Kansas. He was convicted to prison for the deaths of two FBI agents in 1975. There is much controversy surrounding the circumstances of the deaths and of Peltier's conviction. Leonard's status is more well-known overseas, and is considered by some to be a "political prisoner" who was targeted by the FBI during the U.S. government's efforts to curb the activities of AIM and other organizations during the 1970s.

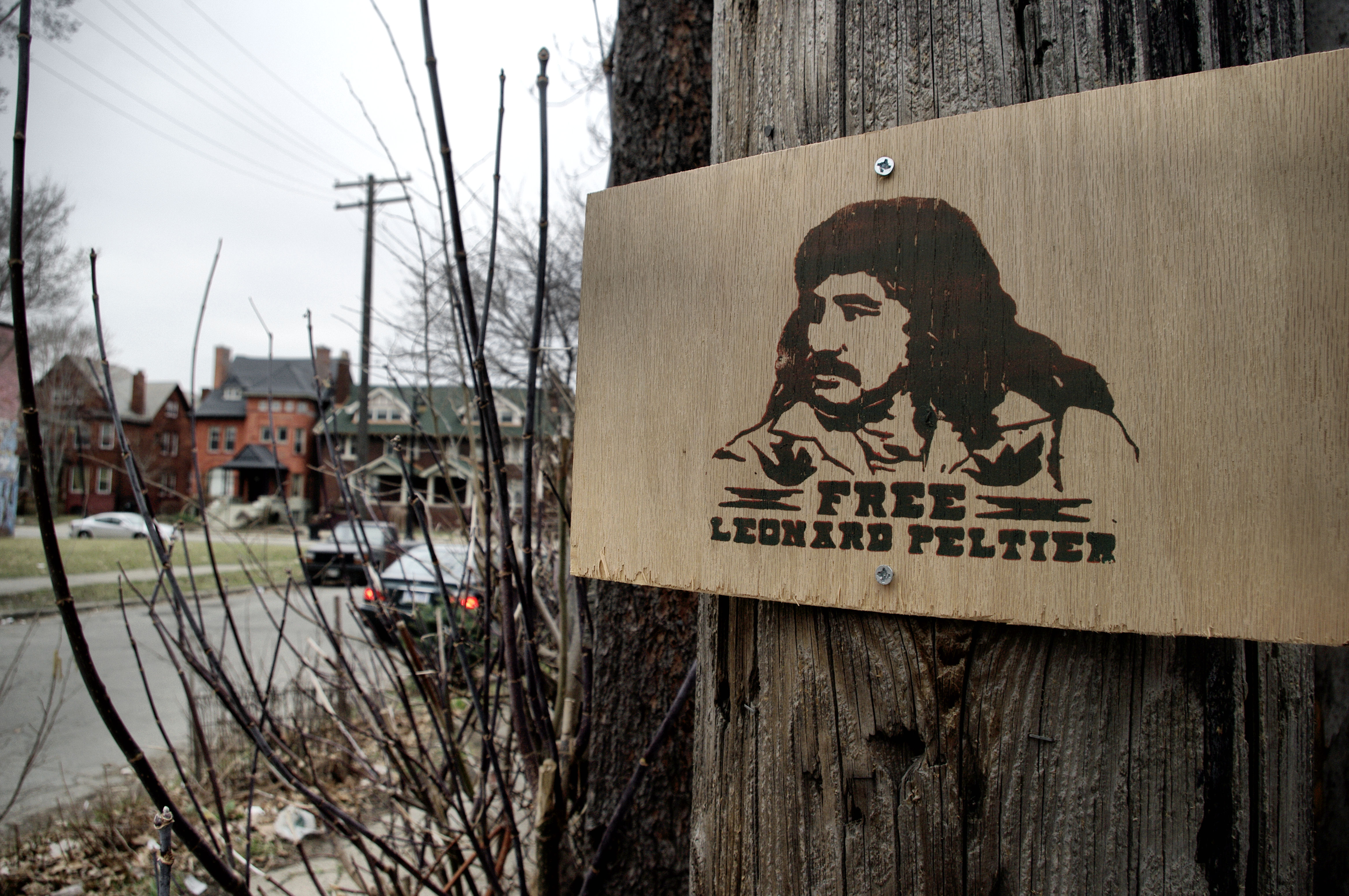
A 'Free Leonard Peltier' sign in Detroit Michigan.(March 2009)

=== National Indigenous Congress ===
The National Indigenous Congress (Congreso Nacional Indígena, CNI) is an organization of communities, nations, towns, neighborhoods, and indigenous tribes of Mexico. In its own words, the CNI is "... a space of unity, reflection and organization of the indigenous peoples of Mexico, promoting the integral reconstitution of the original peoples and the construction of a society in which all cultures, all the colors, all the towns that we are Mexico". Since its foundation, five national congresses have been held, among several activities.

=== Native American Journalists Association ===
The Native American Journalists Association (NAJA) is committed to educating its members about culture and tradition. It works to ensure free press, speech and religion and promote Native culture.

=== Native American Rights Fund ===
The Native American Rights Fund (NARF) is a non-profit organization that uses existing laws and treaties to ensure that state governments and the national government live up to their legal obligations. NARF also "provides legal representation and technical assistance to Indian tribes, organizations and individuals nationwide." "NARF is governed by a volunteer board of directors composed of thirteen Native Americans from different tribes throughout the country with a variety of expertise in Indian matters. A staff of fifteen attorneys handles about fifty major cases at any given time, with most of the cases taking several years to resolve. Cases are accepted on the basis of their breadth and potential importance in setting precedents and establishing important principles of Indian law".

In September 2001, tribal leaders met in Washington, D.C., and established the Tribal Supreme Court Project in an effort to "strengthen tribal advocacy before the U.S. Supreme Court by developing new litigation strategies and coordinating tribal legal resources." The ultimate goal is to improve the win-loss record of Indian tribes in Supreme Court cases. The Project is staffed by attorneys from the Native American Rights Fund (NARF) and the National Congress of American Indians (NCAI). It consists of a Working Group of over 200 attorneys and academics from around the nation specializing in Indian law and other areas of law that impact Indian cases, including property law, trust law, and Supreme Court practice. In addition, an advisory board of tribal leaders assists the project by providing the necessary political and tribal perspective to the legal and academic expertise.

The Tribal Supreme Court does the following:

- In conjunction with the National Indian Law Library, monitors Indian law cases in the state and federal appellate courts that have the potential to reach the Supreme Court (NILL Indian Law Bulletins)
- Maintains an online depository of briefs and opinions in all Indian law cases filed with the U.S. Supreme Court and cases being monitored in the U.S. Court of Appeal and State Supreme Courts (court documents)
- Prepares an Update Memorandum of Cases which provides an overview of Indian law cases pending before the U.S. Supreme Court, cases being monitored, and the current work being performed by the Project
- Offers assistance to tribal leaders and their attorneys to determine whether to file a Petition for a Writ of Certiorari to the U.S. Supreme Court in cases where they lost in the court below
- Offers assistance to attorneys representing Indian tribes to prepare their Brief in Opposition at the Petition Stage in cases where they won in the court below
- Coordinates an Amicus Brief writing network and helps to develop litigation strategies at both the Petition Stage and the Merits Stage to ensure that the briefs receive the maximum attention of the Justices
- When appropriate, prepares and submits Amicus Briefs on behalf of Indian tribes and Tribal Organizations
- Provides other brief writing assistance, including reviewing and editing the principal briefs and the performance of additional legal research
- Coordinates and conducts Moot Court and Roundtable opportunities for attorneys who are presenting Oral Arguments before the Court
- Conducts conference calls and fosters panel discussions among attorneys nationwide about pending Indian law cases and, when necessary, forms small working groups to formulate strategy on specific issues

=== National Congress of American Indians ===
The NCAI was founded in 1944 at a gathering of over 100 Native Americans in Denver, Colorado (many of the participants were elected leaders of the tribes that were involved in the Indian Reorganization Acts of 1934). The formation of the NCAI was encouraged by John Collier (reformer), who realized that the United States Congress and the people were becoming more focused on World War II and less attention was focused on Native American affairs. The NCAI decided to dedicate themselves to lobbying for or against specific legislation and also to focus on civil and voting rights.

=== National Indian Education Association ===
The National Indian Education Association (NIEA) is a membership-based organization "committed to increasing educational opportunities and resources for American Indian, Alaska Native, and Native Hawaiian students while protecting our cultural and linguistic traditions."

NIEA came into being in 1970. The largest and oldest Indian education organization in the U.S., it aims to move Indian Country towards educational equity. NIEA is governed by a Board of Directors made up of twelve representatives, and it has committees that "work to ensure native educators and students are represented in various educational institutions and forums throughout Indian Country and Washington, D.C."

=== National Indian Youth Council ===
The National Indian Youth Council (NIYC) was founded by Clyde Warrior (Ponca) and Melvin Thom (Paiute). Their work resulted in an action program and a newspaper called ABC: Americans Before Columbus. To achieve their goals, the NIYC participated in activist actions such as holding "fish-ins" along the rivers in Washington to protest the treaty-given fishing rights being taken away from them due to a nullified Supreme Court decision. These actions were similar to sit-ins held by young African Americans during the civil rights movement to protest equal rights not being granted to them.

=== Society of American Indians ===
This Society of American Indians (SAI) was founded by the Yavapi Indian Carlos Montezuma. The SAI was at the forefront of the fight for Indian citizenship, which was eventually granted in 1924. Their efforts resulted in a number of fish-ins along rivers supporting aboriginal fishing rights, which were nullified by a state supreme court decision, actions modeled on the sit-ins held by black civil rights protestors during the civil rights movement.

=== Early activism ===
The first major recorded action of American Indian activism happened in 1901. A Muskogee creek named Chitto Harjo led a rebellion (also known as the Crazy Snake Uprising) against Allotment in Indian Territory. He and his followers harassed non-natives as well as natives in favor of Allotment. Although this rebellion ended in the arrest of Harjo and his anti-allotment followers (including some Cherokee), the Four Mothers Society for Collective Political Action was formed in 1912. This committee took a more formal approach by sending delegates to Congress to argue their cause against Allotment.

=== Creation of the Office of Economic Opportunity ===
The OEO was founded in 1964 as a result of Indian support of Point Four Program, similar to President Truman's Point IV program but adapted to LBJ's War on Poverty. OEO created a "symbiotic relationship" with NCAI and the Indian Division, making an anti-BIA. One goal of the OEO was to help Native Americans gain skills and experience that would enable them to move up the bureaucratic ladder, control the OEO programs, become the managers of the OEO programs, decide where the money made by the tribe would go, what programs to make, and get Native land back. Some OEO programs that benefit Native Americans are the Job Corps, Neighborhood Youth Corps, Operation Headstart, VISTA, Legal Services, and the Community Action Programs. The Community Action Programs give tribes "the opportunity to develop and administer their own economic and social programs." The OEO also "channel[ed] federal funding directly to tribal governments". Tribal governments submit plans for local projects to the Office of Economic Opportunity. Once tribe members approved the plan, "the OEO contracted with the tribal government to operate the project" and provided the necessary budgeted funds.

=== Red Power movement ===
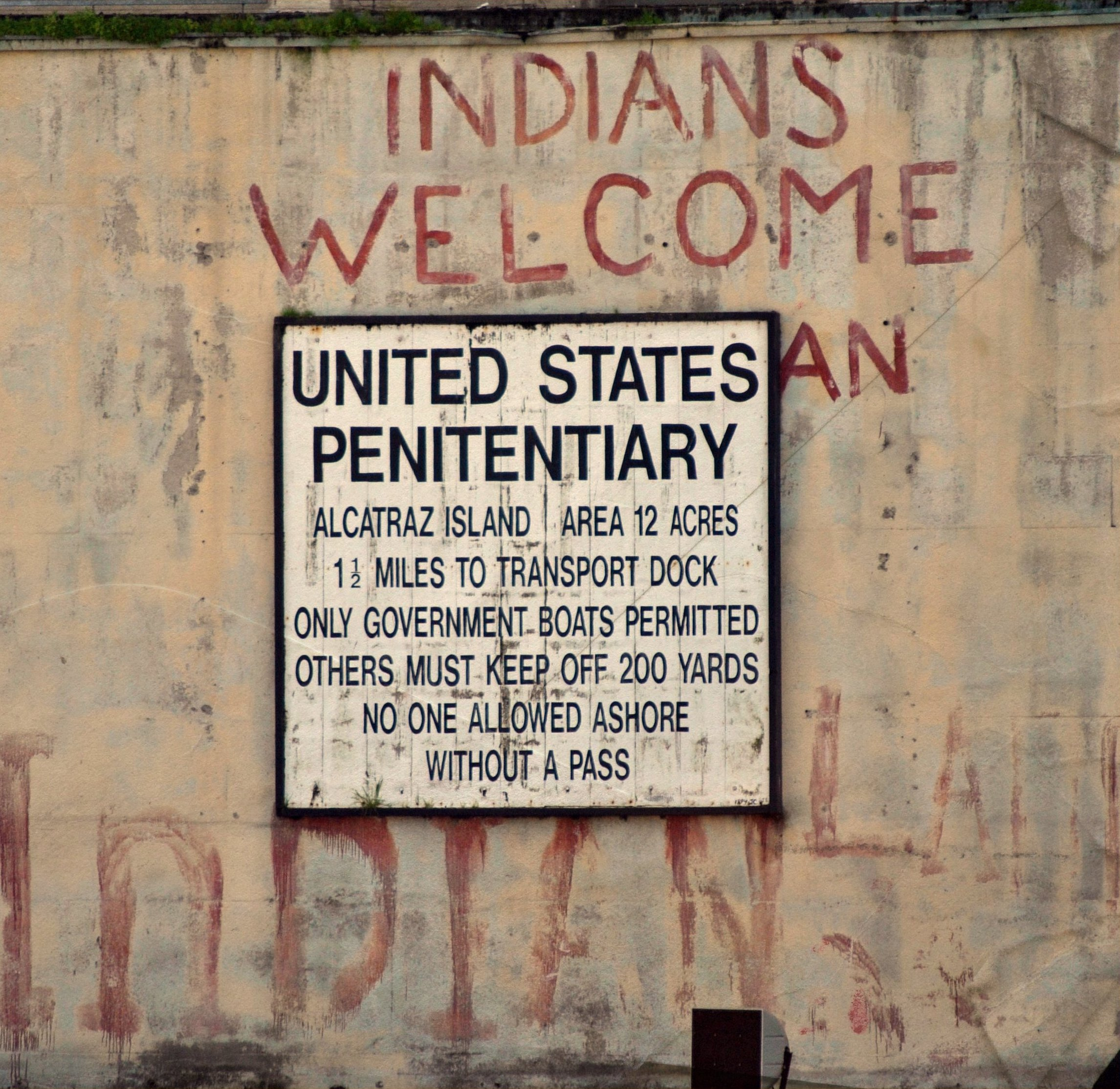
A lingering sign of the 1969–71 Native American occupation of Alcatraz Island (2010 Photograph).

The Red Power movement is the activist movement that came to prominence in the 1960s. It was the Civil Rights Movement of the American Indian. One of the key events in the Red Power movement was the Occupation of Alcatraz. The occupation started on 20 November 1969 with 79 Indians disembarking on Alcatraz Island in the San Francisco Bay and ended 19 months and 9 days later on 11 June 1971. The group placed demands, which consisted of the deed to Alcatraz and funding to establish a university and a cultural center. These demands were rejected, but the event received considerable media attention.

Throughout the 1960s, the battle to regain fishing rights that had been previously guaranteed in treaties during the mid-nineteenth century but later restricted after WWII for conservation purposes, continued in the northwestern United States.A series of fish-ins and protests occurred in Olympia, Washington. The National Indian Youth Council spearheaded the campaign. Marlon Brando joined the fish-in effort and was arrested along with Episcopal minister John Yaryan on 2 March 1964, during a NIYC fish-in on the Puyallup River. Over the course of the fish-in efforts, over 45 tribes came together to support and help. For this reason, Clyde Warrior, a leader of the NIYC, considered the fish-in protests to be "the beginning of a new era in the history of American Indians" and other members of the NIYC considered the protesting to be "the greatest Indian victory of modern day."

In August 1970 and in June 1971, two separate occupations of Mount Rushmore occurred. These were efforts to reclaim the Black Hills and to insist that the Fort Laramie Treaty of 1868 be honored and recognized by the United States of America.

In November 1972, the Trail of Broken Treaties Caravan occurred. This involved the American Indian Movement, the National Indian Brotherhood (a Canadian organization), the Native American Rights Fund, the National Indian Youth Council, the National American Indian Council, the National Council on Indian Work, National Indian Leadership Training, and the American Indian Committee on Alcohol and Drug Abuse. The cross-country caravan eventually converged on Washington D.C. where the organizations demonstrated for six days. Eventually, a group took over the Bureau of Indian Affairs. Many public documents where destroyed during the takeover.

A more violent demonstration began in February 1973, when members of the American Indian Movement and the Oglala Sioux occupied the site of the Wounded Knee Massacre of 1890 located in the Pine Ridge Reservation in South Dakota. This siege ended after 71 days with the surrender of the AIM group. Two Indians, Frank Clearwater and Buddy Lamont, were killed; one federal marshal was injured.

=== Indianismo ===
Indianismo is a political and cultural movement in Latin America that emerged in the early 20th century, advocating for the recognition, empowerment, and rights of Indigenous peoples. Rooted in a critique of colonialism and mestizo-dominated national identities, Indianismo emphasizes the value of Indigenous cultures, languages, and worldviews as central to national identity and political reform. It gained particular prominence in countries such as Bolivia, Peru, and Ecuador, often aligning with leftist or anti-imperialist ideologies. Unlike broader indigenismo, which often paternalistically promoted Indigenous inclusion from outside perspectives, Indianismo typically involves Indigenous leaders and communities advocating for self-determination and political autonomy.
