= Cogewea =

1927 Western romance novel

Cogewea: The Half-Blood A Depiction of the Great Montana Cattle Range
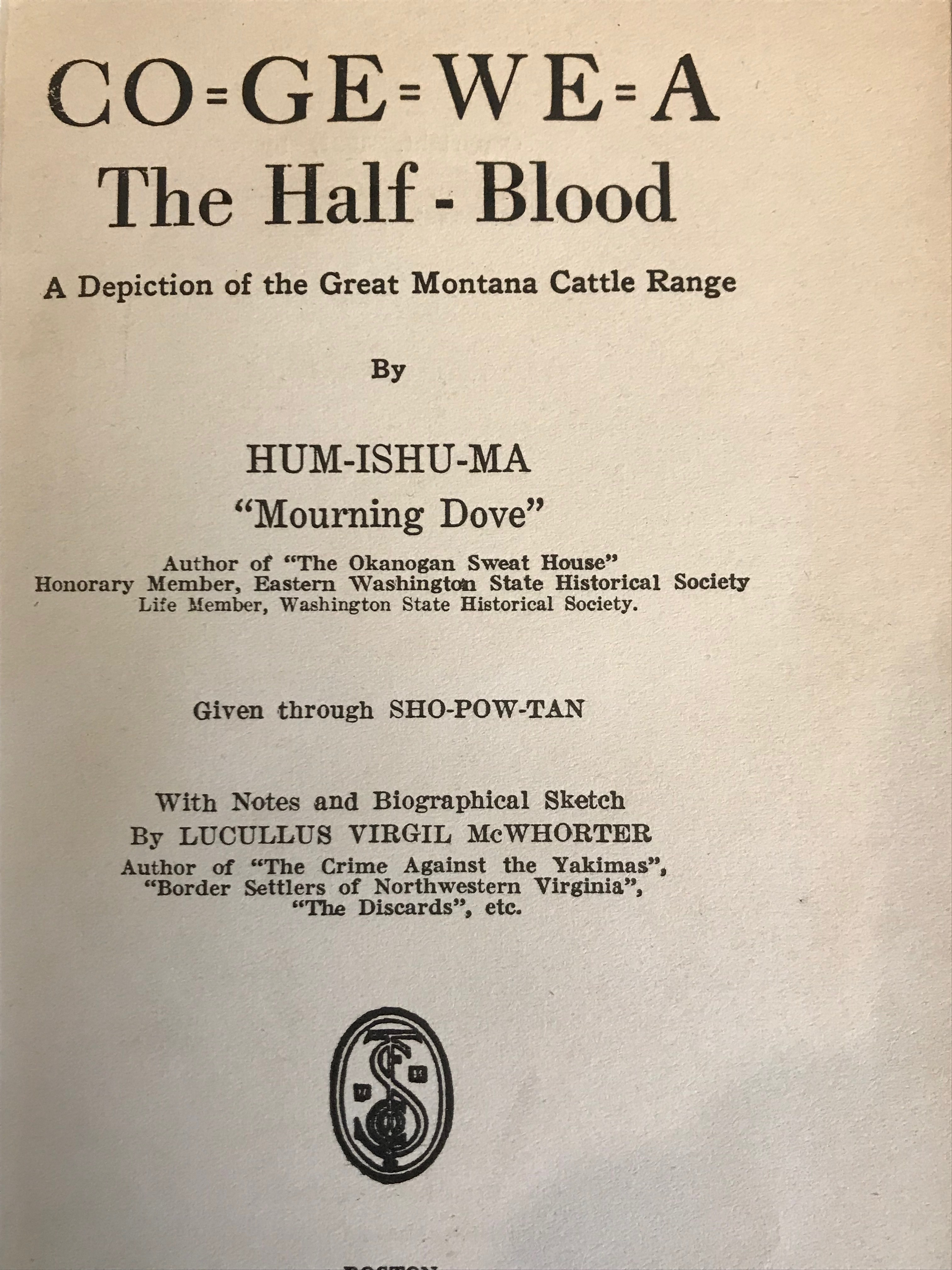
- Title page, first edition, 1927
- Author: Mourning Dove (author)
- Language: English
- Genre: Western (genre)
- Publisher: Four Seas Company
- Publication date: 1927
- Publication place: United States and Canada

Co=ge=we=a, The Half-Blood: A Depiction of the Great Montana Cattle Range is a 1927 Western romance novel by Mourning Dove, also known as Hum-Ishu-Ma, or Christine Quintasket (Okanogan and Arrow Lakes). It is one of the earliest novels written by an indigenous woman from the Plateau region. The novel includes the first example of Native American literary criticism.

Cogewea, the eponymous protagonist, is a woman of mixed-race ancestry, both Indigenous and Euro-American, who feels caught between her two worlds. She works on the ranch of her sister and white brother-in-law in Montana, where she is respected for her talents and skills. A European American from the East, Alfred Densmore, joins the ranch as an inexperienced ranch-hand. Cogewea is torn between the world of her white father and that of her Okanagan (spelled "Okanogan" in the novel) grandmother, Stemteema.

Her work was supported by editor Lucullus Virgil McWhorter, an American anthropologist and activist for Native Americans. He threatened the publishing company, Four Seas Press, in order to get the novel published.

Controversy has developed over McWhorter's influence over and changes in the novel. While some scholars believe his edits were typical for the genre and his time, others consider McWhorter to be a second author of the novel. McWhorter denied having that large a role.

== Plot ==
The novel opens with a description of the frontier landscape and introduces Cogewea, a young Okanagan (spelled "Okanogan" in the novel) who is multiracial (with a white father and Okanagan mother). Her Okanagan grandmother describes her as an impulsive and free-speaking young woman. A well-loved figure on her white brother-in-law's ranch, Cogewea is also well-educated in Okanagan folklore and values through her grandmother. But she feels a tension between her two cultures. Cogewea grapples with having received a western education at the Carlisle Indian Industrial School in central Pennsylvania, the model of Indian boarding schools, where children were forced to give up their languages and cultures.

One rancher, Silent Bob, tells a new rancher, Alfred Densmore, that Cogewea is heir to a large property and fortune, though she is not. Densmore tries to steal Cogewea's property and money through seduction, proposing marriage. Cogewea's grandmother uses storytelling and Okanagan traditions to convince Cogewea that Densmore will take advantage of her. After a period of indecision, Cogewea refuses Densmore's proposal. He ends up taking Cogewea captive, but after he realizes that she has little financial worth, he leaves her to die in the wilderness.

In the end, a mixed-race rancher named Jim rescues Cogewea. In a twist of fate, Cogewea inherits part of her white father's fortune. She realizes her feelings for Jim and marries him.

=== Major characters ===
Cogewea: the eponymous main character is a young woman who has a love for nature and is a skilled horse rider. She is headstrong but charming and loved by many at the HB Ranch. Like most members of the ranch, her heritage is Indigenous and Euro-American. Her name means 'chipmunk' (Okanagan q̓ʷəq̓ʷc̓wíyaʔ).

James 'Jim' Lagrinder: The multi-racial foreman of the HB Ranch is described as "the best rider on the Flathead." He listens to Cogewea, and while she considers him to be family, and he calls her "sis," he hopes he can kindle a romance with her.

Stemteema: Cogewea's grandmother, who raised Cogewea and her sisters, Mary and Julia. She does not trust the Shoyapee (her term for white people, which loosely translated compares the "white man" to a "the hog because of his greedy nature"). She tells a series of stories to Cogewea, warning her of impending danger after Cogewea falls in love with the antagonist, Alfred Densmore. Each of her warnings come true.

Alfred Densmore: The greenhorn easterner (a stock western character) whom Cogewea hires. He is told by Celluloid Bill (as a prank) that Cogewea possesses a fortune in land and capital, which is not true. He then devises a plan to seduce Cogewea and steal her money.

Mary: Cogewea's sister who is quiet but also distrusts white culture. She ends up marrying Frenchy, who is a European but respects Indigenous culture and identity.

Julia: Cogewea's sister who has married a white man who owns the HB Ranch. She has assimilated into white culture.

Silent Bob: A comical prankster cowboy (a stock character in the Dime Western). He may be a parody of Owen Wister's taciturn eponymous hero in The Virginian (novel). Bob tells Densmore that Cogewea has money and land, leaving her vulnerable to Denmore's machinations. However, Bob breaks from his stock mold to tell Cogewea the truth about Densmore.

Frenchy: A seemingly minor character who marries into Cogewea's family.

== Major themes ==
The major theme of the novel is the conflict which Cogewea feels as a "half-breed" who is caught between the Indian and white worlds, tradition and change. Cogewea's two sisters: Mary and Julia represent the two paths Cogewea could choose. Mary has maintained a traditional way of life with the guidance of her grandmother, while Julia has married a white man and assimilated into American culture. Her husband, John Carter, is described warmly.

Another major theme is the perils of marriage; it is portrayed as especially dangerous when between an indigenous woman and white man. Densmore insists on a traditional indigenous marriage ceremony between himself and Cogewea, but Cogewea's grandmother believes their union will lead to abuse. In Chapter XIX, "The Story of Green-Blanket Feet," Stemteema warns Cogewea that "the fate of green-blanket feet is for you, my grandchild, unless you turn from him [Densmore]" The fate Stemteema refers to is the escape by an Indian woman, Green-Blanket Feet, from a situation of domestic violence; she leaves her children behind, as she is afraid that her white husband will hunt her down otherwise. This is particularly heartbreaking, as in most Indian cultures, children are considered to be born to the mother's family. Densmore does commit violence against Cogewea, proving her grandmother's point.

With Cogewea, Mourning Dove attempted to infuse the western romance with the oral traditions of her Okanagan culture. Some scholars believe that the author intended to break with the tropes of the Western, as well as to demonstrate the value of Okanagan stories and cultural traditions, even in a colonized context.

The conventional themes of the Western as written by men, such as progress, western expansion, rugged individualism, and frontier hardiness, are turned on their head. For example, the comical prankster cowboy, a stock character of the Dime Western, usually plays unfeeling pranks. However, in this novel, this character decides to reveal his lie out of affection for Cogewea. Also, Mourning Dove draws from Syilx (Okanagan) oral history to express the realities of frontier life as well as her complicated feelings towards assimilation.

Scholars such as Dexter Fisher argue that Mourning Dove's inclusion of Okanagan stories was intended to express Okanagan cultural concepts in literature. For example, Fisher notes a recurring motif of Okanagan "Spirit Power," in the novel. Throughout the book, characters with indigenous ancestry have correct intuitions about the future, which they attribute to guidance from their ancestors. For example, Jim is said to know that Cogewea will win the horse race because his "spirit power" told him. Fisher argues that Mourning Dove feared was that a European-American audience would ridicule such Okanagan concepts.

== Publication ==
Mourning Dove finished writing Cogewea in 1912 but it was not published by Four Seas Press until 1927. Her friend and editor, Lucullus Virgil McWhorter had threatened to sue the press to have the book released. Difficulties and delays in publishing the novel were partly due to shortages in paper and printing materials during World War I. But the publisher also resisted acknowledging Mourning Dove as an Indigenous novelist rather than as an ethnographic source.

Indigenous peoples in the twentieth century were largely excluded and even blocked from publishing in Canada and the United States. Mourning Dove's eventual success can be seen as an aberration rather than the norm.

=== Editor controversy ===
Scholars have debated the extent to which McWhorter was an editor or collaborator. The first late 20th-century take on the book, provided by Charles Larson in 1978, suggests McWhorter may have been more than an editor. Later, Linda K. Karell wrote, “Not only are two authors [of Cogewea] very evident, each author has at least two cited names, that in turn indicate the varied cultural positions of each occupied.” Albert Braz also argues that Cogewea has “at least two” authors. McWhorter did not claim to be the author of Cogewea.

Alanna Brown argued that though the novel was “ultimately co-written by L.V. McWhorter,” Mourning Dove's voice remains in the novel and “in its essence, the book is hers.” Brown frequently used the term “collaboration” to describe the relationship between Mourning Dove and McWhorter. Most recent scholarship since her 1997 article has also used this term.

Susan K. Bernardin notes that while Mourning Dove and McWhorter had a “complex collaboration,” his changes were focused on language and not plot, which was typical practice for an editor. Scholars such as Jace Weaver and Louis Owens focus on the Okanagan cultural knowledge provided in the novel, all of which must have come from Mourning Dove. To support his perspective that McWhorter was only an editor, Weaver argues that Mourning Dove, “had already completed a draft of the book, probably in 1913,” before meeting McWhorter. Further, Owens argues that while both figures’ voices can be heard in the book, Mourning Dove's voice “easily” wins out.

Author Sherman Alexie (Spokane/Coeur d'Alene), who is based in Seattle, has written essays about the collaboration on this book.

== Reception ==
When the book was first published, audiences found the novel's style awkward. Mourning Dove was accused by one US Indian agent of falsely claiming that she had written the novel. After receiving assurances McWhorter wrote to him strongly supporting Mourning Dove's authorship, the agent recanted his statements. Over her lifetime, Mourning Dove gained both notoriety and respect as an author. It was not until the late 20th century that Cogewea gained scholarly attention, following a revival of interest in women's and indigenous people's works.

Since that time, scholarship has focused on the infusion in Cogewea of Western tropes with Native American storytelling. In the novel, Alfred Densmore attempts to steal land and money he believes Cogewea possesses (she doesn't), and ends up abusing her when he finds out she is poor. Scholars agree that this plot line is a re-writing of the Silyx Okanagan oral story of Chipmunk and Owl Woman, where Owl Woman is the devourer and Chipmunk barely survives her encounter. Chipmunk is the meaning of Cogewea's name (Okanagan q̓ʷəq̓ʷc̓wíyaʔ). Jeannette Armstrong, a First Nations woman who claims to be a grand-niece of Mourning Dove, says that the author had a "masterful knowledge of what Okanagan oral story is and how it works".

Recent scholarship has also recognized the novel as a work of Indigenous empowerment.
