= Vision quest =

Rite of passage in some Native American cultures

A vision quest is a rite of passage in some Native American cultures. Individual Indigenous cultures have their own names for their rites of passage. "Vision quest" is an English-language umbrella term, and may not always be accurate or used by the cultures in question.

Among Native American cultures who have this type of rite, it usually consists of a series of ceremonies led by elders and supported by the young person’s community. The process includes a complete fast for four days and nights, alone at a sacred site in nature which is chosen by elders for this purpose. Some communities have used the same sites for many generations. During this time, the young person prays and cries out to the spirits that they may have a vision, one that will help them find their purpose in life, their role in a community, and how they may best serve the People. Dreams or visions may involve natural symbolism – such as animals or forces of nature – that require interpretation by elders. After their passage into adulthood, and guided by this experience, the young person may then become an apprentice or student of an adult who has mastered this role.

When talking to Yellow Wolf, Lucullus Virgil McWhorter came to believe that the person fasts, and stays awake and concentrates on their quest until their mind becomes "comatose." It was then that their Weyekin (Nez Perce word) revealed itself.

== Use by non-Native Americans ==
Non-Native, New Age and "wilderness training" schools offer what they call "vision quests" to the non-Native public. However, despite the name, these experiences may bear little resemblance to the traditional ceremonies beyond fasting and isolation. Such use of the term "vision quest" has been criticized as "cultural appropriation", with those leading the exercises derided as "plastic shamans". Such exercises may include New Age versions of a sweat lodge, which has at times led to untrained people causing harm and even death, such as in the James Arthur Ray manslaughter incident, which involved a 36-hour, non-Native idea of a vision quest, for which the participants paid almost $10,000.

Like a number of other Indigenous ceremonies, the vision quest has been mentioned in statements by Indigenous leaders concerned about the protection of ceremonies and other Indigenous intellectual property rights; one of these documents is the 1993 Declaration of War Against Exploiters of Lakota Spirituality. In 2007 the United Nations adopted the Declaration on the Rights of Indigenous Peoples (UNDRIP), which has given further support to Indigenous people's rights to protect their cultures and ceremonies, and address restitution when intellectual, religious and spiritual property is taken without their free, prior and informed consent or in violation of their laws, traditions and customs.

== See also ==
- Chilla-nashini
- Medicine man
- Meditation
- Plains Indians
- Muhammad's first revelation
- Walkabout
- Årsgång
