= Michael J. Lindstrom =

Michael J. Lindstrom Michael J. Lindstrom
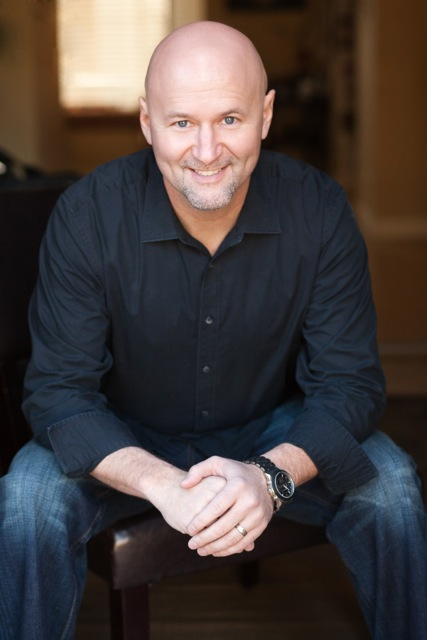
- Michael J. Lindstrom
- Born: Modesto, CA
- Education: California Western School of Law
- Occupations: Author, Relationship/Communication Coach, Professional Speaker
- Notable work: Dan & Mike's Guide to Men: 10 Secrets Every Woman Should Know from Two Guys That Do
- Spouse: Monica Lindstrom

Michael J. "Mike" Lindstrom is an author, relationship/communication coach and professional speaker from Scottsdale, Arizona.

== Education and career as a speaker and coach ==
Lindstrom was born in Modesto, California. He graduated from the University of California, San Diego (U.C.S.D.) and earned his Juris Doctor (J.D.) from California Western School of Law in San Diego. Lindstrom then became a corporate consultant for author and speaker Tony Robbins, working as an executive coach for Fortune 500 Companies. He now delivers keynote speeches for corporations, and serves as a coach and image consultant. As a colleague in the self-help speaking industry, Lindstrom also delivered commentary on the James Ray case on CNN.

He is married to attorney and legal analyst Monica Lindstrom.

== Career as a relationship expert ==
Lindstrom teamed up with Las Vegas motivational speaker Dan Lier to write the book Dan & Mike's Guide to Men: 10 Secrets Every Woman Should Know from Two Guys That Do in 2010. The book is a guide directed toward women being better able to understand men. The pair do weekend relationship programs in Las Vegas for men and women based on the book. They also appeared on VH1's 40 Most Shocking Celebrity Break Ups. Lindstrom hosts solo the annual Taboo event as well, oriented on improving communication in relationships by dealing with embarrassing topics. He has appeared in the media as a relationship expert discussing infidelity as it relates to political sex scandals and Tiger Woods, and discussing relationship issues and opportunities for improvement. As an image consultant, he appeared on Fox News, discussing the 2008 presidential candidates. In addition, he has discussed relationship issues on Good Morning America, Howard Stern and Lucia Live on LA Talk Radio. Following the release of their book, Lindstrom and Lier have launched Reality Show Gurus, acting as reality show talent scouts, and working with production companies to create and develop new reality shows.

== Bibliography ==
Dan & Mike's Guide to Men: 10 Secrets Every Woman Should Know from Two Guys That Do, Mike Lindstrom, Dan Lier, authors, CreateSpace, 2010
