= Yellow Wolf (Nez Perce) =

Nez Perce warrior (c.1855–1935)

- Himiin Maaqs maqs (Yellow Wolf)
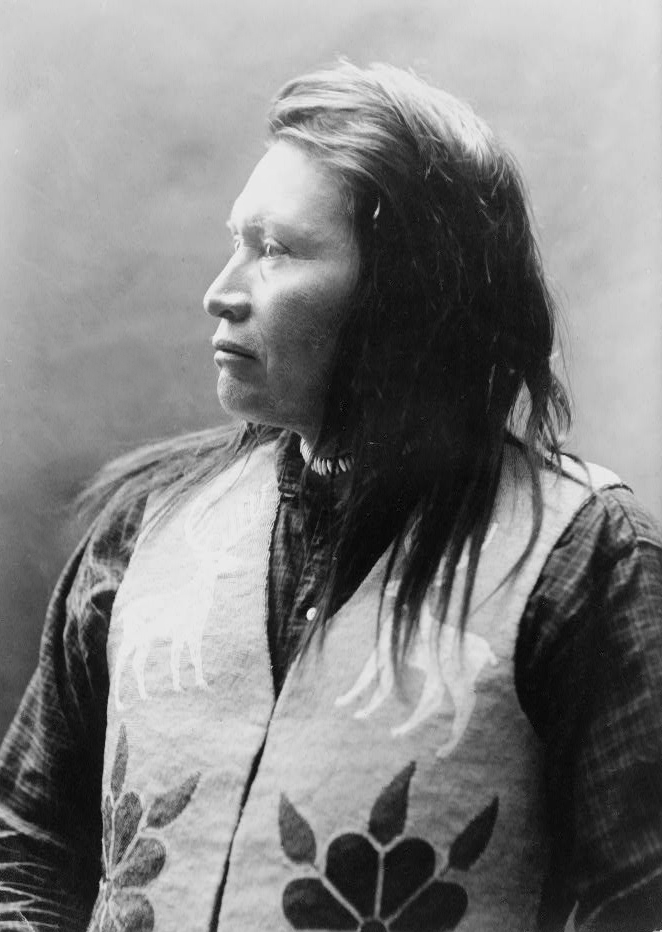
- Photo of Yellow Wolf in his fifties, taken by or for Lucullus Virgil McWhorter, during the course of their friendship and collaboration on the story of Yellow Wolf's people.

Nez Perce, Wallowa band leader

Personal details
- Born: c. 1855 Wallowa Valley, Oregon
- Died: c. August 21, 1935 Colville Indian Reservation, Washington
- Resting place: Nespelem, Washington, near the grave of Chief Joseph
- Spouse(s): Pe-Tol-Von-Nan-Ick (Helen); Ayatootonmi (Little Mountain Woman)
- Relations: Chief Joseph
- Children: Billy Yellow Wolf; A-last-Sauked (Looking-away-off), aka Jasper
- Parent: Seekumses Kunnin (Horse Blanket) (father) Yiyik Wasumwah (Swan Woman) (mother)
- Known for: Nez Perce War,
- Nickname: Heinmot Hihhih (White Thunder or White Lightning) (his "war name")

Yellow Wolf or He–Mene Mox Mox (born c. 1855, died August 1935) was a Nez Perce warrior who fought in the Nez Perce War of 1877. In his old age, he decided to give the war a Native American perspective. From their meeting in 1907 till his death in 1935, Yellow Wolf talked annually to Lucullus Virgil McWhorter, who wrote a book for him, Yellow Wolf: His Own Story. He is notable as one of the few members of the defeated Nez Perce to talk openly to strangers and tell their story to the world.

Others of his tribe said he was making a fool of himself for talking to a white man, saying that the children of the tribe would tell the story. In spite of that, he continued to work with McWhorter. In telling the native's side he said, "I am telling my story that all may know the war we did not want. War is made to take something that is not your own." He was concerned that the next generation of Native Americans would continue to suffer under white oppression, and wrote to help them. He said, "the young generation behind me, for them I tell the story. It is for them! I want the next generation of whites to know and treat the Indian as themselves."

== His message to the world ==
=== Yellow Wolf's perspective on how the Nez Perce War began ===
In his interviews with McWhorter, Yellow Wolf makes it clear that there was increasing pressure placed upon the Native Americans as thousands of white men invaded the Wallowa Valley, especially after the beginning of a gold rush. During that time, Native Americans were being killed by incoming white people, without consequence. They were being hanged and threatened with violence if they didn't give in to settlers' demands for land. The elders in the tribe were trying to take a non-violent route, attempting to keep their people from retaliating.

In addition to that, the representatives of the U.S. government who came to talk to them seemed to be going out of their way to be insulting, or at least took no effort to understand cultural sensitivities. It was against native tradition to use threats or force (called "showing the rifle") during peace talks, which is exactly what General Oliver O. Howard did. He went beyond threats and had another leader, Toohoolhoolzote, locked up because he would not obey. Yellow Wolf said, "That was what brought war, the arrest of this chief and showing us the rifle!"

In spite of this the rest of the Nez Perce leaders at the council still tried to hold the peace, but some of the younger generation took matters into their own hands. A young man, Wahlitits had earlier lost his father to a white man who coveted his land. He had held off revenge because of his father's last wishes. But after the insult by General Howard, he got two cousins, Sarpsis Ilppilp (Red Moccasin Tops) and Wetyetmas Wahyakt (Swan Necklace) to help him kill that man. Unable to find him, they killed another instead. This was the last straw between the two sides, and led to the Nez Perce fleeing their home and the army.

Yellow Wolf's people considered the war on them to be unjust. In his book, Yellow Wolf makes it clear that his group did not agree to the treaty that was put upon them by "armed enforcement." The Nez Perce tribes were not unified, and that just because some of them had signed the "thief treaty" did not mean they spoke for everyone. There were also rifts in the tribe, Christian versus non-Christian. The government was talking to those that they found cooperative, and acting as if these natives spoke for all. And they fled.

== Family ==
=== Before 1877 ===
Yellow Wolf was in his early 20s when he joined the band in its 1877 flight for Canada. Written records don't indicate he was married or had children before then.

=== On the reservation, child mortality, death and divorce ===
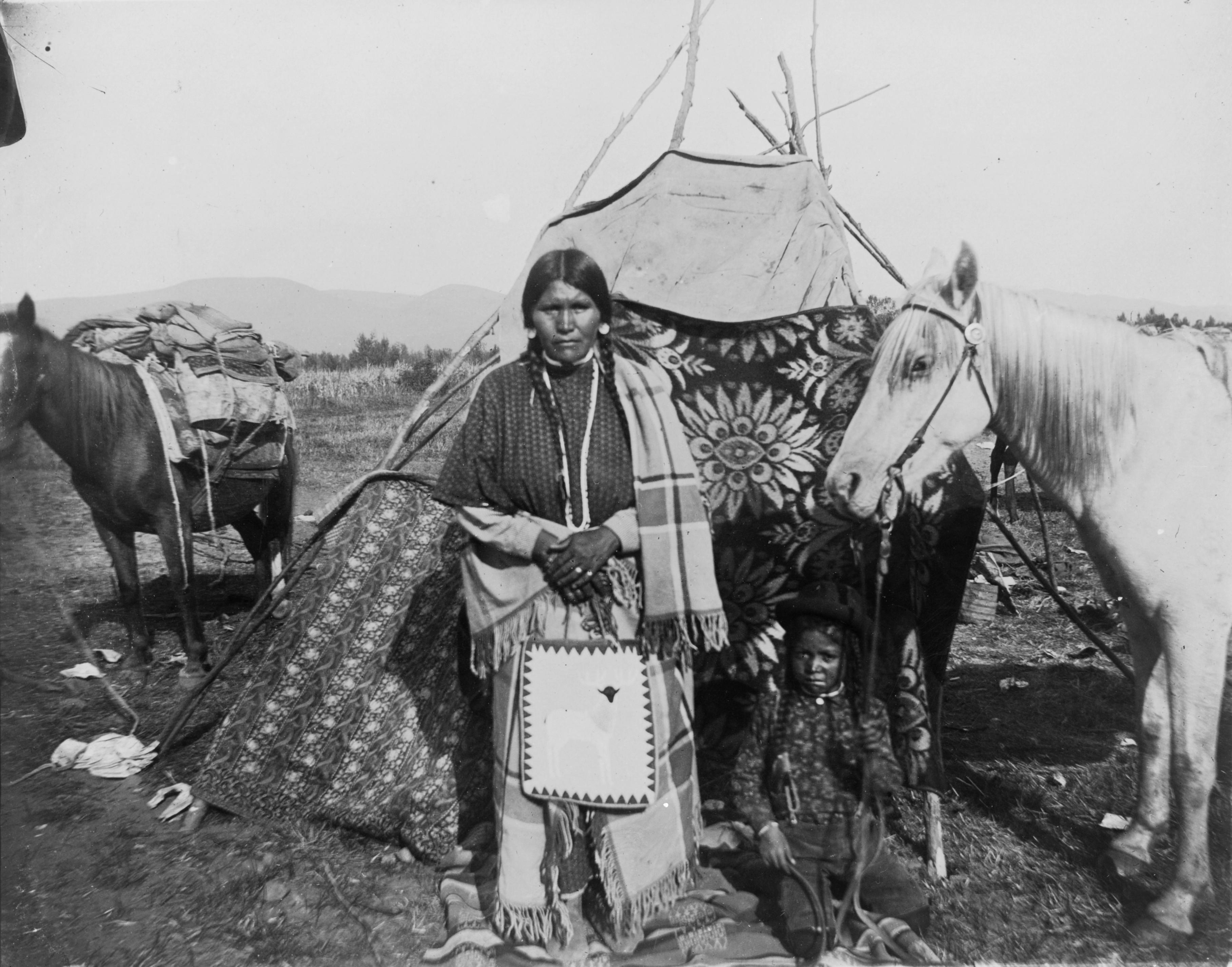
Yellow Wolf's second wife Ayatootonmi and their son Jasper, taken on Lucullus Virgil McWhorter's ranch in Yakima, Washington, in October 1908.

Federal and Indian Affairs census records have recorded the story of Yellow Wolf's family on the Colville Reservation. In 1910, the U.S. Federal Census asked Yellow Wolf to tell about his family, and he said he had married twice (the second for 17 years by that date) and had 9 children (of whom only two were living at that date). By the time of his death in 1935, he told McWhorter that only one of his children was alive, his son Billy.

He was married to a Nez Perce woman named Pe-Tol-Von-nan-Ick, who was known in English as Helen. They were listed together in the 1890, 1892 and 1893 censuses, and she was gone by the 1905 census. It is not recorded whether she died or they left each other. They had a son, Te-Yoh-Yoh-Shin (Billy Yellow Wolf) who was born in 1888. A woman, Chick-A-Moh-Peo (Jean), listed as mother lived with them, in her 80s.

Yellow Wolf had another wife by 1905, I-O-To-ton-My (Little Mountain Woman), and they had a son together who would have been born in 1901. She was eight years younger than Yellow Wolf. They lived with the two sons in the 1906, 1906 and 1910 censuses. The census lists a 1-year-old daughter in 1905, Epu-tepkoset who did not live until 1906.

His son Billy lived with the family off-and-on over the years. He was widowed at age of 21, with a son, and married at least two more times by 1916. Billy's child did not survive; neither did his next son.

=== Last child ===
When Yellow Wolf died in 1935, his son Billy Yellow Wolf was his last living child. Yellow Wolf's younger son, Jasper, died in 1921, and all his daughters died before he did.

== What he taught about Nez Perce culture ==
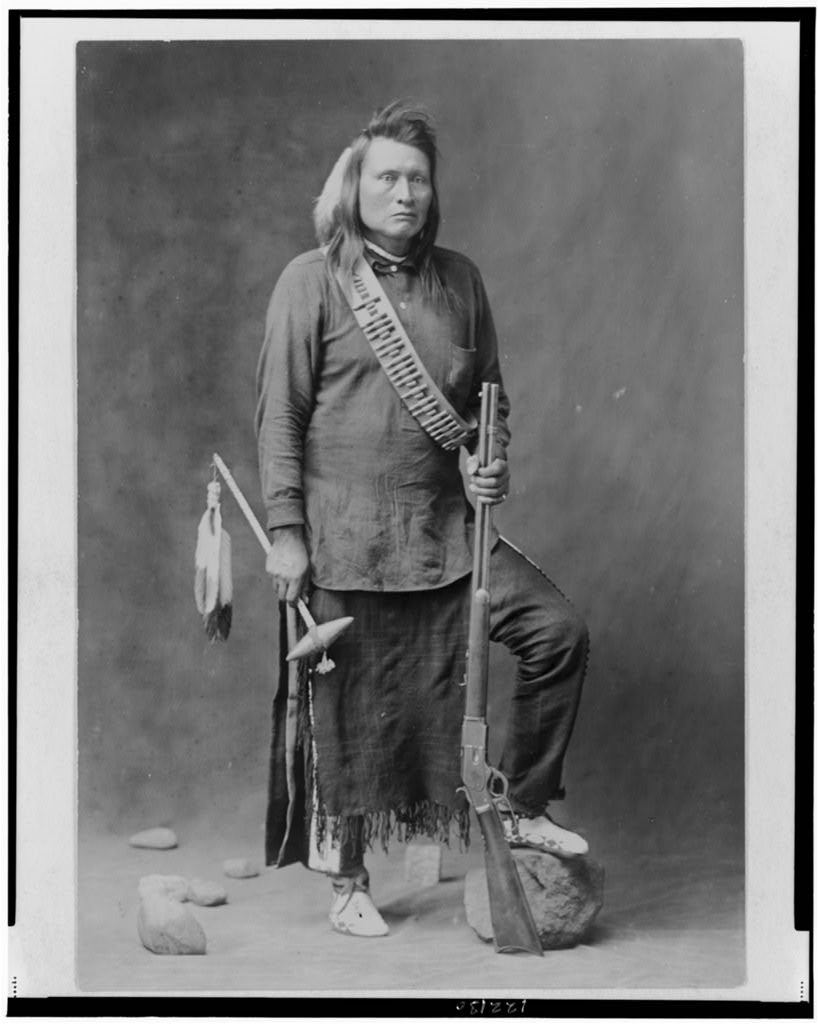
Yellow Wolf, 1877

=== Names ===
Nez Perce warriors were not limited to one name. The warriors in his tribe all had at least two names, some more. Some were serious names, some nicknames. Their names changed throughout their lives. Yellow Wolf did not want to talk about the names of his childhood, because he was limiting focus to his adult life. But in talking about them, he revealed that switching names was something one did, one found a name that fit. Some names were given to you, some were inherited. He had an inherited name, Inneecheekoostin (no translation). Another of Yellow Wolf's warrior names was Pahkar Tamkikeechet (Five Times Looking Through, or Fifteen Lightnings).

Yellow Wolf admitted to going by two names, of which Yellow Wolf was not the one he preferred. The name came out of a vision, but it was also one that white men called him. The Yellow Wolf was a wyakin for him. He talked to McWhorter, about his vision quest as a boy of 13. In it, he saw a vision of a yellow wolf. "It was a Spirit of a wolf that appeared to me. Yellow like in color, it sort of floated in the air. Like a human being it talked to me, and gave me its power...That was how I got named Yellow Wolf. Named for that vision-wolf appearing to me. It was yellow-colored, and gave me the power of the wolf." But even though he went by the name, he said that Yellow Wolf was not what he was normally called among his people. He was known more for that among whites. "The whites call me Yellow Wolf, but I take that as a nick-name. My true name is different, and is after the Spirit which gave me promise of its power as a warrior. I am Heinmot Hihhih, which means White Thunder (or White Lightning). Yellow Wolf is not my own chosen name."

His other prominent name, Heinmot Hihhih, was also connected to his spirituality. Thunder is made to kill as it strikes and rolls along. "My kopluts [war club] I made when a boy, by directions of the Spirit that gave me promise of warrior power. It has the same killing strength as thunder."

Both names went into who he was. As a warrior, he was irresistible like thunder, but also had the incredible fighting qualities of a wolf.

=== Spelling ===
The Nez Perce language was not a written language, and attempts to write it down produced a variety of spellings. Spellings are an attempt to use the English alphabet to spell native words. The problem with this is that native words use consonant sounds that English does not have.

Yellow Wolf's native name was spelled He-Men-Mox-Mox, He-Min-Mox-Mox in the census records. In McWhorter's book it was Hemeneme Moxmox. Elsewhere it has been He-men Moxmox. His other name (White Lightning) was rendered In-mat-hia-hia and Heinmot Hihhih. His second wife's name also illustrates the difficulty spelling. It has been spelled Ayatootonmi and I-o-tu-ton-my. Their son Jasper's native name has been spelled A-last-Sauked and Elots-on-se.

=== Religion and attitude toward violence ===
In 1877, there was a religious rift within the Nez Perce community. Parts of the people had converted to Christianity – these were settled onto the Lapwai Reservation. Others including Yellow Wolf, who settled on the Colville Reservation, followed their native religion, which McWhorter called the "Dreamer Faith". In Yellow Wolf's words, "We believed in our own Hunyewat [God, or Deity], We had our own Ahkunkenekoo [Land Above]. Huyewat gives us food, clothing, everything.

The native faith included a perception that the things around them (animals, trees, rocks, wind, sky) had spirits. They didn't worship the spirits, but developed relationships with them, called Wyakin, in which the spirits would guide them and lend them their spirit qualities in time of need. Yellow Wolf attributed his success in the Nez Perce War to his Wyakin, which was strong.

One of the effects of the Dreamer Faith on Yellow Wolf's tribe was to adopt pacifist methods to dealing with force. Yellow Wolf speaks of the tribal leaders refusal to use violence to deal with the white soldiers. Even using threats of force was taboo with them, and it led to Toohoolhoolzote being locked up for passive resistance during a counsel with General Howard. Not all of the tribe held to these beliefs, and violence erupted, leading to the Nez Perce War of 1877. Their non-violent struggle ultimately became a flight from the US Army, and then a war; as McWhorter said in Yellow Wolf's book, "Every warrior interviewed on the subject testified to his advocacy for peace; but after the irretrievable step had been taken, he promptly took up the rifle."

== His legacy, peacemaker ==
By the time of his 1935 death, Yellow Wolf had come to be known among some members of white society as a peacemaker. His obituary in the Spokane Daily Chronicle said he had been friendly to his white neighbors, and that he was "not an enemy of the white man". He told McWhorter that he looked at how people treated him: "I am glad we get along so well. It is the way I have been with everyone who treats me right. I like good people."
