= Inipi =

Lakota purification ceremony

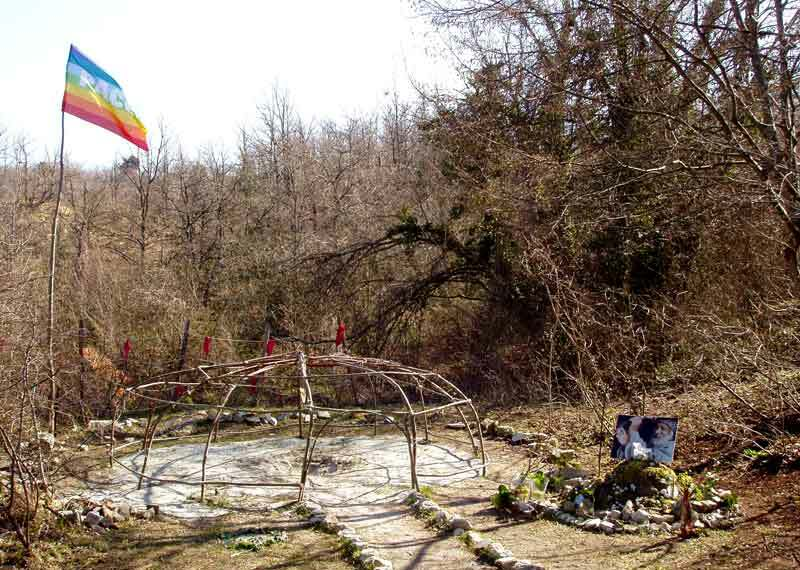

The inípi, or iníkaǧapi, ceremony (Lakota: i-, in regard to, + ni, life, + kaǧa, they make, -pi, makes the term plural or a noun, 'they revitalize themselves', in fast speech, inípi), a type of sweat lodge, is a purification ceremony of the Lakota people. It is one of the Seven Sacred Ceremonies of the Lakota people, which has been passed down through the generations of Lakota.

Those who have inherited and maintained these traditions have issued statements about the standards to be observed in the inípi. In the March 2003 meeting it was agreed among the spiritual leaders and Bundle Keepers of the Lakota, Dakota, Nakota, Cheyenne and Arapaho Nations that:

I-ni-pi (Purification Ceremony): Those that run this sacred rite should be able to communicate with Tun-ca-s'i-la (our Sacred Grandfathers) in their Native Plains tongue. They should also have earned this rite by completing Han-ble-c'i-ya and the four days and four years of the Wi-wanyang wa-c'i-pi.

This also follows upon the decisions made at the Lakota Summit V, an international gathering of US and Canadian Lakota, Dakota and Nakota Nations, where about 500 representatives from 40 different tribes and bands of the Lakota unanimously passed a "Declaration of War Against Exploiters of Lakota Spirituality". The declaration was unanimously passed on June 10, 1993. Among other things, it specifies that these ceremonies are only for those of the Lakota, Dakota and Nakota Nations.

One concern about outsiders trying to perform these ceremonies is not only does it go against the express wishes of the traditional healers who have inherited these ceremonies, but also that those who do not know how to do them properly have in some cases caused dehydration and heat stroke, resulting in injury and even deaths.

== See also ==
- Cultural appropriation
- Plastic shaman
- Sweat lodge
