= Weyekin =

Weyekin or wyakin /ˈwiːjəkɪn/ is a Nez Perce word for a type of spiritual being.

According to Lucullus Virgil McWhorter, everything in the world - animals, trees, rocks, etc. - possesses a consciousness. These spirits are thought to offer a link to the invisible world of spiritual power. These spirits are seen not as divine beings, but as mediators. This native spirituality aligns with religions that are based on animism.

To receive a weyekin, a young person around the age of 12 to 15 would go to the mountains on a vision quest. The person about to go on this quest would be tutored by a "renowned warrior, hunter, or medicine man," for boys, or for girls, "an elderly woman of reputed power." Success had much to do with how they prepared their minds. Fasting for long periods of time, going without a fire, holding their spiritual retreat in a remote and "awe inspiring" location.
