= Chantal Lavigne case =

Death of a participant in a New Age sweat ritual

Chantal Lavigne died in July 2011 in Sherbrooke, Québec (Canada) from hyperthermia and multiple organ dysfunction following an esoteric sweating ritual, which was invented and led by Gabrielle Fréchette, a New Age workshop leader. Her death was the object of worldwide media coverage. The criminal trial ended in the incarceration of the three individuals found responsible for Lavigne's death: Gabrielle Fréchette, Ginette Duclos and Gérald Fontaine.

== New Age group ==
Interested in spirituality, organic farming and alternative medicine, Lavigne started to regularly attend workshops with a group focused on New Age beliefs in 2007. Beginning with reiki and other forms of energy healing, she spent four years participating with the same group in workshops exploring different disciplines associated with the New Age movement.

The group was led by Gabrielle Fréchette, who was allegedly channeling the spirit of the mythical character Melchizedek to act as a guide for the group. Until 2007, Fréchette was offering a large number of workshops that heavily leaned into esotericism, as well as private consultations, in her own personal growth consultancy in Sainte-Hélène-de-Chester, Quebec, before declaring bankruptcy. She thereafter rented locations to continue the same activities, with some members of the group eventually becoming trainers themselves. Offering costly training sessions allowing students to eventually become trainers is a common business model among personal growth groups, according to experts.

Lavigne quickly started to participate in a wide range of group activities, including overseas trips. Fréchette encouraged her to persevere by telling her she was once a shaman herself in a past life. Despite questioning the group leader's methods on occasion, Lavigne increased the number of workshops she attended.

In 2009, while Lavigne was taking a year off work after the birth of her second child, the frequency of the workshops increased as contact with her family and friends decreased, with some events lasting weeks. Her family would later learn that Fréchette told her it was her destiny to endure tragic events unless she completed her esoteric training, a prophecy she also made about other members of the group to convince them to register for more workshops. In hindsight, several members of the group say Fréchette was manipulative in various ways.

Having graduated in administration, Lavigne was recognized as a reliable and responsible secretary, with an eye for financial matters. She nevertheless piled up $40,000 in credit card debt for training sessions on various topics, which allowed her in turn to practice reiki and lead others in various ceremonies. In July 2011, Lavigne cancelled a camping week-end with her spouse and children to attend a workshop of several days with the group. She had told her husband she believed something tragic would happen unless she went.

== Lavigne's death ==
The sweating ritual took place on July 29, 2011. It concluded a multi-day workshop called "Mourir en conscience" ("dying in consciousness") held in a rented farmhouse in Durham-Sud. Fréchette compared this experience to the sweat lodges used by North American Indigenous Peoples, but what happened during the workshop had nothing in common with that ceremony, which is centered around prayer and held sacred to the tribes who practice it.

On a hot summer day, indoors and upstairs in the rented farmhouse, the participants in Fréchette's workshop were asked to lie down on the floor. They were covered in a film of dirt brought in from outside. Then, despite the heat, they were each covered with blankets and a plastic tarp, and their heads placed inside a cardboard box. Fréchette, with her assistants Ginette Duclos and Gérald Fontaine, then led them in breathing exercises to provoke a state of hyperventilation. Fréchette claims this exercise is taught by the "French shaman" Patrick Dacquay, but Dacquay denies having trained Fréchette and his own workshops differ in several important aspects.

Along with eight other participants, Lavigne spent between five and nine hours in that position, without water or food, before Fréchette decided to end the experience. Three of them stopped during that period, including one experiencing serious physical discomfort. Fréchette, who has no medical training, called emergency services; first for a participant who seemed to be experiencing hypoglycemia, and then again when she realized Lavigne appeared to be unconscious.

Paramedics remarked how hot and humid the second floor of the building was when they went upstairs. They saw sleeping bags, blankets, tarps strewn about with dirt, cardboard boxes, vomit and feces. Having difficulties obtaining critical information from Fréchette about what happened, one of the respondents called the police. At that point, Lavigne's blood oxygen was very low and she was breathing rapidly. Her pupils were not responding to light stimulation. She was first transported to Hôpital Sainte-Croix in Drummondville, where an emergency physician determined she was suffering from severe dehydration and shock. Her organs had been deprived of oxygen for a significant amount of time. The medical team proceeded with fluid replacement through her bone marrow, a last-resort treatment for severely dehydrated patients. Lavigne was eventually transferred to the larger Hôpital Fleurimont in Sherbrooke, where she died some time later.

The coroner's report concluded that Lavigne died from hyperthermia and multiple organ dysfunction. Aged 35, she had no prior medical condition.

== The trial ==
Gabrielle Fréchette, Ginette Duclos and Gérald Fontaine were arrested by the provincial police a full year later, on July 26, 2012, and retained their freedom during the trial.

The trial started on October 14, 2014. It was attended by several members of Lavigne's family and led to widespread media coverage. The accused pleaded not guilty to charges of criminal negligence causing death and declined to have a jury trial. Their lawyer argued that Lavigne's death was accidental, given the precautions taken by the accused, and that participants were free to retire from the ritual at any point.

This being the first time a Canadian court of justice had to examine a case of this type, relevant jurisprudence was scarce. In Canada, as in many jurisdictions, the courts examine the events and the role played by each person, mostly leaving aside the religious or spiritual motivations that may motivate the actions of the accused. Accordingly, the issues raised during the trial had more to do with the precautions Fréchette took (or failed to take), as provider of a service, to ensure the safety of the participants.

To obtain a conviction, the Attorney had to show the accused were hosting an activity that was "inherently dangerous, without taking all necessary precautions." The emergency physician who treated both victims testified that in his opinion, all participants were in danger, given the nature and duration of the ritual.

The trial ended on December 8, 2014, with Justice Hélène Fabi finding all three of the accused guilty of criminal negligence having caused the death of Lavigne, as well as criminal negligence causing bodily harm in the case of Théberge. The judge commented that the accused showed "a wild and reckless lack of concern with regard to the life and safety of the victims."

In August 2015, before the sentencing hearing, Fréchette changed lawyers, provoking a delay in the proceedings. She also indicated she gradually stopped offering personal growth workshops. On January 29, 2016, the judge announced she was imposing the sentence asked by the attorney, namely three years imprisonment for Fréchette, and two years for the other co-defendants. The judge acknowledged the severity of the sentence: "The Court believes this is the only way to dissuade these persons from undertaking such activities, and to prevent their proliferation. We must send a clear message."

Their incarceration was suspended after three days, as the Quebec Court of Appeal accepted to hear the case. This second ruling, rendered in 2017, confirmed the first one. With the end of judicial proceedings, Fréchette, Duclos and Fontaine returned to prison on November 17. All three, without prior convictions, were freed after six months. Fréchette was forbidden to host esoteric activities during her probation period.

== See also ==
- James Arthur Ray, a new age workshop leader convicted for the death of three people at a similar event in 2009.
