= Jeannette Armstrong =

Canadian author, educator, artist, and activist

Jeannette Christine Armstrong OC
- Born: 1948 (age 77–78); Penticton Indian Reserve, British Columbia, Canada
- Writing career
- Language: Okanagan, English

Jeannette Christine Armstrong OC (Okanagan: lax̌lax̌tkʷ; born 1948) is a Canadian author, educator, artist, and activist. She was born and grew up on the Penticton Indian reserve in British Columbia's Okanagan Valley, and fluently speaks both the Syilx and English languages. Armstrong has lived on the Penticton Native Reserve for most of her life and has raised her two children there. In 2013, she was appointed Canada Research Chair in Okanagan Indigenous Knowledge and Philosophy at the University of British Columbia.

Armstrong's 1985 work Slash is considered the first novel by a First Nations woman in Canada.

Armstrong is Syilx Okanagan. Her mother, Lilly Louie, was from Kettle Falls and belonged to the Kettle River people, and Armstrong's father belonged to the mountain people who lived in the Okanagan Valley. Armstrong has stated that as an Okanagan person, she considers the land where she and her relatives were raised to be integral to her identity. Her paternal grandfather, Thomas James Armstrong was the Irish husband of her paternal grandmother Christine Joseph. Armstrong's maternal great-grandmother was Theresa Quintasket, paternal aunt of Mourning Dove (Christine Quintasket). In the Okanagan kinship system Quintasket was a cousin-aunt to Armstrong's mother Lilly Louie (Quintasket was first cousin to Armstrong's maternal grandfather). In the Okanagan kinship system she would be recognized as Armstrong's grand-aunt (the same word in Okanagan). Armstrong identified strongly with the book Cogewea, the Half-Blood, written by Mourning Dove, one of the earliest Native American women novelists in the United States. Some sources have disputed Armstrong's claim of a familial relationship with Christine Quintasket (Mourning Dove), though Armstrong maintains it is consistent with Okanagan kinship recognition. Armstrong is best known for her involvement with the En'owkin Centre and writing. She has written about topics such as creativity, education, ecology, and Indigenous rights.

== Early life and education ==
While growing up on the Penticton Indian Reserve in British Columbia, Armstrong received a formal education at a one-room school there, as well as a traditional Okanagan education from her family and tribal elders. She learned to speak the Okanagan and English languages fluently. For many years since her childhood, Armstrong has studied traditional Okanagan teachings and practiced traditional ways under the direction of Elders.

Armstrong discovered her interest and talent for writing at age fifteen when a poem she wrote about John F. Kennedy was published in a local newspaper (Voices). As a teenager, Armstrong continued to publish poetry and develop her literary voice by reading and listening to works by Aboriginal authors such as Pauline Johnson and Chief Dan George, who she identifies as her early influences.

In 1978, Armstrong received a diploma of Fine Arts from Okanagan College and a Bachelor of Fine Arts degree from the University of Victoria where she studied Creative Writing. In 2009, she obtained a Ph.D. in Indigenous Environmental Ethics from the University of Greifswald in Germany.

== Educator ==
In 1978, Armstrong began employment with the Penticton Band in a number of cultural and political roles. She also worked as a researcher, consultant, and writer at the En'owkin Centre (Lutz 13 and Petrone 140).

The En'owkin Centre, located on the Penticton Indian Reserve and operated exclusively by the six bands of the Okanagan Nation, is managed in conjunction with Okanagan College and the University of Victoria. It has the goal of providing students with a strong cultural and academic foundation for success in further post-secondary studies (En'owkin and Petrone 140). The objectives of the society which governs En'owkin, as Armstrong describes, are "to record and perpetuate and promote 'Native' in the cultural sense, in education, and in our lives and our communities" (qtd in Lutz 27).

To support these objectives, the En'owkin Centre created the Okanagan Curriculum Project (Lutz 27). This project develops school curriculum that presents Okanagan history in an accurate and dignified way (Lutz 27). Armstrong and her fellow members on the Okanagan Tribal Education Committee believe that Okanagan people must tell their own stories. The curriculum project founded the Learning Institute, which provides adult Native people with skills in research and writing so that First Nations individuals can develop quality, correct, and appropriate information for the project (Lutz 28).

In 1980, the curriculum project founded Theytus Books Ltd., the first publishing house in Canada owned and operated by First Nations people. It is run as a division of the En'owkin Centre (Lutz 28 and Theytus). The En'owkin Centre's programs help to provide Theytus with proficient employees who work collectively in efforts to produce and promote appropriate reading material and information created by Native authors, illustrators, and artists (Lutz 28 and Theytus).

Appointed in 1986 as the executive director of the En'owkin Centre, Armstrong continues to serve in that position. In 1989, she helped to establish the En'owkin School of International Writing and became its director, as well as an instructor (Petrone 140). It is the first creative writing school in Canada to award credit that is operated entirely by and for Aboriginal people (Petrone 140 and Voices).

== Literary works ==
Armstrong published two children's books in the early 1980s, Enwhisteetkwa (or Walk in Water) in 1982 and Neekna and Chemai the following year.

She did research for two years in preparation for writing Slash (1985), her first and most famous novel (Petrone 179 and Lutz 22). Armstrong's novel was commissioned by the curriculum project, for use as part of a grade eleven study in contemporary history. According to Armstrong, the novel Slash was intended to resonate with contemporary students (Jones 60). She took on the project to forestall the work of more famous non-Aboriginal authors, who were "dripping at the mouth" to document Native history (Williamson qtd in Jones 60).

Slash explores the history of the North American Indian protest movement through the critical perspective of central character Tommy Kelasket, who is eventually renamed Slash. Tommy has encountered intolerance in an assimilationist school system and racist North American society, but his family encourages him to be proud of his Okanagan heritage. He becomes an activist for Aboriginal rights. Armstrong has said that Slash is not a chronicle of AIM (American Indian Movement); rather, the text provides a personalized account of the origins and growth of Native activism since the 1960s (Lutz 22 and Jones 51).

Since Slash was published, Armstrong has written in a variety of genres and is widely published. Her poetry is collected in anthologies and her collection Breath Tracks (1991). Her short stories are collected in works such as All My Relations: An Anthology of Contemporary Canadian Native Fiction, edited by Thomas King. Armstrong's second novel, Whispering in Shadows (2000) traces the life experiences of a young Okanagan activist woman.

In addition, Armstrong has published critical works, such as The Native Creative Process. This is a collaborative discourse between Armstrong and Douglas Cardinal on Aboriginal artistry. In Land Speaking, she addresses how land and the Okanagan language influence her writing.

== Activism ==
Armstrong is an advocate for Indigenous people's rights and focuses her research on the revitalization of Indigenous communities and culture. She has served as a Canada Research Chair (CRC) in Indigenous Philosophy and is involved in a number of committees that reflect her beliefs in educating future Indigenous generations on traditional Indigenous knowledge.

Armstrong is part of the Canada Research Chair (CRC) in Okanagan Indigenous Knowledge and Philosophy, and her aim is to bring awareness to the stories of the Syilx Okanagan first nations communities, which pertains to a large amount of indigenous knowledge that is overlooked and majorly inaccessible.

She has contribute articles and is a consultant to the Center for Ecoliteracy in Berkeley, California. This foundation encourages education that develops sustainable patterns of living. She has acted as a consultant to social and environmental organizations such as the Centre for Creative Change, Esalen Institute, Omega Institute, and the World Institute for Humanities at Salado ("Awardee").

As a campaigner for Aboriginal rights, Armstrong serves as an international observer to the Continental Coordinating Commission of Indigenous Peoples and Organizations. She was named as one of seven Indigenous Judges to the First Nations Court of Justice called by the Chiefs of Ontario and to the Council of Listeners in the International Testimonials on Violations of Indigenous Sovereignty for the United Nations ("Awardee").

== Criticism and influence ==
In her study of Native literature, Penny Petrone includes Armstrong amongst a young generation of university-trained Aboriginal authors who contributed to original creative works to Canadian literature during the 1980s (138). Critical analysis of Armstrong has generally studied her poetry and, more extensively, her first novel. Petrone describes Armstrong's poetry as "direct, unequivocal, and assertive, even aggressive" (163).

In a 1989 interview with Hartmut Lutz, Armstrong relates that some feminist scholars questioned her decision to create a male protagonist for her novel Slash. She defends her choice, believing she portrayed both female strength and male development in the book. (Lutz 18). In the same interview, Armstrong notes, "I've been criticized by non-Native critics in terms of character development" (qtd in Lutz 15–16). She explains that she could not isolate the character of Slash from his community in order depict his individual nature and still compose the story for her people (Lutz 16). Armstrong argues that Slash's personal growth can be perceived through his relationships with his family and community (Lutz 16).

In her study of Slash, Manina Jones catalogues a number of critical responses to the work; she says that many academic articles relate the difficulties of readers in understanding Armstrong's novel. Jones describes Slash as a work that refuses priority to speech or writing, insisting on a hybrid status (55). Jones includes the views of other critics with her own in showing that Slash is unique in its aesthetic practice and didactic purpose. She says that Armstrong compels readers through this novel to consider her text in ways that may be unfamiliar to them. Jones suggests that an innovative critical reading approach is essential to appreciate Armstrong's work and satisfy the goals of the Okanagan Indian Curriculum Project.

Armstrong is dedicated to the advancement of literature and the arts among First Nations people and the realization and promotion of the distinct artistic forms of Aboriginal people in the international arts and literary community (Creative 126). Armstrong has received recognition for her work from both Indigenous communities and international organizations.

== Awards and honours ==
- 1974: Mungo Martin Award for First Nations people in education for Native art
- 1978: Helen Pitt Memorial Award support of emerging artists
- 2000: Honorary Doctorate in Letters, St. Thomas University
- 2003: Buffett Award for Aboriginal Leadership in recognition of Armstrong's work as an educator, community leader and Indigenous rights activist
- 2016: George Woodcock Lifetime Achievement Award
- 2017: BC Community Achievement Award community involvement particularly with language teacher training and developing traditional languages
- 2023: Officer of the Order of Canada

== Selected publications ==
=== Novels ===
- 1990: Slash. 1985/Rev. ed. Penticton, BC: Theytus
- 2000: Whispering in Shadows. Penticton, BC: Theytus

=== Short stories ===
- 1990: "This is a Story," in All My Relations: An Anthology of Contemporary Canadian Native Fiction. Thomas King, ed. Toronto: McClelland & Stewart p. 129–135.

=== Poetry ===
- "A History Lesson"
- 1991: Breath Tracks. Stratford, ON: Williams-Wallace/Penticton, BC: Theytus
- 1992: "Trickster Time" in Voices: Being Native in Canada. Linda Jaine and Drew Hayden Taylor, eds. Saskatoon: Extension Division, U of Saskatchewan p. 1–5.

=== Anthologies edited ===
- 1993: Looking at the Words of Our People: First Nations Analysis of Literature. Penticton, BC: Theytus
- 1993: We Get Our Living Like Milk from the Land. Researched and Compiled by the Okanagan Rights Committee and the Okanagan Indian Education Resource Society. Penticton: Theytus (with Lee Maracle et al.)
- 2001: Native Poetry in Canada: A Contemporary Anthology. Peterborough, ON: Broadview (with Lally Grauer)

=== Children's books ===
- 1982: Enwisteetkwa (Walk in Water). Penticton, BC: Okanagan Indian Curriculum Project/ Okanagan Tribal Council
- 1984: Neekna and Chemai Penticton, BC: Theytus (illustrated by Kenneth Lee Edwards)
- 1991: Neekna and Chemai 2nd ed.Penticton, BC: Theytus (illustrated by Barbara Marchand)

=== Criticism ===
- 1988: "Traditional Indigenous Education: A Natural Process." in Tradition Change Survival: The Answers Are within Us. Vancouver: UBC First Nations House
- 1989: "Bridging Cultures." Columbiana: Journal of the Intermountain Northwest 30 : 28–30.
- 1989: "Cultural Robbery: Imperialism – Voices of Native Women." Trivia 14 : 21–23.
- 1991: The Native Creative Process: A Collaborative Discourse Penticton, BC: Theytus, . (with Douglas Cardinal. Photographs by Greg Young-Ing)
- 1992: "Racism: Racial Exclusivity and Cultural Supremacy" in Give Back: First Nations Perspectives on Cultural Practice. Maria Campbell et al., eds. Vancouver: Gallerie, p. 74–82.
- 1998: "Land Speaking," in Speaking for the Generations: Native Writers on Writing. Simon J. Ortiz, ed.. Tucson: U of Arizona P, p. 174–194.

== Recordings ==
- "Mary Old Owl" on Poetry is Not a Luxury: A Collection of Black and Native Poetry Set to Classical Guitar, Reggae, Dub, and African Drums. Maya: CAPAC, 1987. Produced by The Fire This Time.
- "World Renewal Song" on cassette "Theft Of Paradise": a collection of Black and Indigenous poets produced by The Fire This Time.
- Various tracks including "Indian Woman" and "Keeper's Words" on the album "Till The Bars Break". Black and Indigenous dub poets, reggae and hip hop artists produced by The Fire This Time. Nominated for a Juno award best world beat recording.
- "Grandmothers." Word Up. Virgin/EMI Music Canada, 1995.

== Interviews ==
- Interview with Hartmut Lutz. Contemporary Challenges: Conversations with Canadian Native Authors. Saskatoon: Fifth House, 1991. 13–32.
- Interview with Victoria Freeman. "The Body of Our People." The Power to Bend Spoons: Interviews with Canadian Novelists. Beverley Daurio, ed. Toronto: Mercury, 1998. 10–19.
- Armstrong, J. (Interviewee) & Hall, D. E. (Interviewer). (2007). Native Perspectives on Sustainability: Jeannette Armstrong (Syilx) [Interview transcript].

== Selected criticism of Armstrong's literary work ==
- Beeler, Karin. Image, Music, Text: An Interview with Jeannette Armstrong. Studies in Canadian Literature, 21.2, 1996, pp 143–154
- Green, Matthew. A Hard Day's Knight: A Discursive Analysis of Jeannette Armstrong's Slash. Canadian Journal of Native Studies, 19.1 (1999): pp 51–67
- Fee, Margery. Upsetting Fake Ideas: Jeannette Armstrong's Slash and Beatrice Culleton's April Raintree. Canadian Literature 124–5, 1990, pp 168–180
- Hodne, Barbara and Helen Hoy. "Reading from the Inside Out: Jeannette Armstrong's Slash". World Literature Written in English, 32.1, Spring, pp 66–87
- Jones, Manina. Slash Marks the Spot: 'Critical Embarrassment' and Activist Aesthetics in Jeannette Armstrong's Slash. West Coast Line 33.3 (2000): 48–62
- Williamson, Janice. Jeannette Armstrong: "What I Intended Was to Connect...and It's Happened". Tessera, 12, 1992, pp 111–129

== See also ==
- Canadian literature
- Canadian poetry
- List of Canadian poets
- List of Canadian writers
- List of writers from peoples indigenous to the Americas
