= Dime Western =

A dime Western is a modern term for Western-themed dime novels, which spanned the era of the 1860s–1900s. Most would hardly be recognizable as a modern western, having more in common with James Fenimore Cooper's Leatherstocking saga, but many of the standard elements originated here: a cool detached hero, a frontiersman (later a cowboy), a fragile heroine in danger of the despicable outlaw, savage Indians, violence and gunplay, and the final outcome where Truth and Light wins over all. Often real characters — such as Buffalo Bill or the famous Kit Carson — were fictionalized, as were the exploits of notorious outlaws such as Billy the Kid and Jesse James. Buffalo Bill's literary incarnation provides the transition from the frontier tales to the cowboy story, as he straddles both of the genres.

There were several different formats. From 1860 to roughly 1880, the stories appeared in small pamphlets, generally about 100 pages each, and sold for ten to fifteen cents. These books were issued at irregular intervals, and they were kept in print for years, as well as being reprinted under different titles. Later, the weekly magazine format came to predominate. These libraries were 32 pages, and sold for a nickel or a dime. Both formats were printed on cheap acidic paper, and relatively few have survived the years, despite circulation measured in the tens of millions.

In 1919, Street & Smith canceled the last of their five-cent weeklies (New Buffalo Bill Weekly) and replaced it with the pulp Western Story Magazine, which brought the western into its modern form. The genre continued to evolve as new media came along, and mass market paperbacks and comic books maintained the western story's popularity well into the late twentieth century. Its popularity has waned in the 21st century.

== The Western Dime Novel ==
=== Background ===
The first profitable mass literature in America was the dime novel, which emerged in 1860. The dime novel focused on the West because of America's increasing fascination and curiosity with expansion, Native Americans, and pioneers. This curiosity, combined with new technologies in publishing and distribution, made the western dime novel increasingly popular reading material until 1900. Dime novels were written on pulp paper and featured black and white and/or color pictures. Some of the most popular dime novelists between 1860 and 1900 were Ned Buntline, Edward Ellis, Prentiss Ingraham, and Edward Wheeler. Dime novelists began writing as part of a greater push for profits and mass production. The novelists had a low level of autonomy in publishing houses and felt an urgent pressure to publish fast. The dime novel was introduced by Irwin and Erastus Beadle, and was a cheaper form of reading than the previous fifteen- or twenty-cent readings seen in the 1830s and 1840s. From 1860-1898, the Beadles operated the first dime novel publishing house. The first successful Beadle dime novels published were Seth Jones and The Captives of the Frontier. Beadle dime novels focused on adventures in the Wild West, and targeted their novels successfully toward young boys. While young boys were statistically the largest demographic of dime novel western readers, the stories reached a nationwide audience.

During the 1830s America was approaching 20 million people, most of whom were literate. Western dime novels provided a cheap, tangible form of literature that the common person could understand and enjoy. The first Beadles-Adams dime novel, Malaeska: The Indian Wife of the White Hunter, was based on white hunters and native "savages". This dime novel sold 65,000 copies in just a few months. A dime novel was intended to be read for pleasure. In the later half of the nineteenth century, men and women worked tirelessly caring for children and livestock or working in industry. Dime novel western readers read to escape daily urban life in exchange for some Wild West action and adventure. Dime novels provided colorful scenes of cowboys, Indians, horses, and gunpowder and were originally intended for middle class audiences, but upper and lower classes alike purchased and read the stories. Bootblacks, scholars, and businessmen found excitement in western fiction.

After the American Civil War there was a growing fear of American men becoming overly feminine from industry and shifting away from agriculture. Literary scholars have theorized that reading western dime novels was a way to rekindle the manly spirit of the Frontier. By the late nineteenth century—the heyday of dime novel publication—the western frontier was coming to a close as white settlers blanketed the region. Dime novels played an initial role in mythologizing the West. Relatively few dime novels have survived to the present, and the ones that do are often difficult to access in private collections. For decades historians and scholars dismissed dime novels as a valid source of research for the American West because of their fictional plots and cartoony characters. But since the 1960s, cultural historians have mined them for material on popular representations of the West and the mythology of the frontier.

=== Setting and Plot ===
Scholars who have studied western dime novels argue that they portray the West as a utopia of cattle ranching, mountain men, blazing sun, and exciting pioneer life. When action is taking place in a dime novel, the plot is typically set among a western backdrop of snow-covered mountains, expansive deserts, and perhaps a river. The western frontier in dime novels is often depicted by a lone cabin occupied by a few settlers and not much else. The frontier appears as a dangerous place of Indian raids, cattle roundups, and wilderness adventures.

=== Recurring Characters ===
Scholars of dime novels have described the western hero as a man who is above reproach from laws or familial duties and lives freely on the frontier. Dime novels and other works of western fiction personify heroes in two ways. One hero has a rough and tumble attitude and shoots anything with legs. He is unaware of the balance of nature and lives without restraint. The second version of a western hero appreciates nature as God's great work and rescues women in distress. There is a difference between the two heroes, which was intended by publishers to appeal to wider audiences. Davy Crockett and Daniel Boone are two examples of opposite heroes. Davy Crockett, also known as the "King of the Wild Frontier" and depicted wearing a coonskin cap, was popularized for his efforts in the Texas Revolution. He died during the Battle of the Alamo. Daniel Boone was a frontier pioneer who participated in the fur trade. Born in 1734, he is one of the earliest pioneers and American western hero.

“Indian hating” is a common trait among heroes on the frontier, usually because they have lost family members to savage raids. Many heroes seek revenge on native tribes for crimes in white settlements. Violent passages in dime novels involving shoot-outs and scalping are common among these heroes. By the 1870s, however, the hero shifted towards a more socially acceptable demeanor. He becomes refined, self-reliant, and lives harmoniously with the wilderness, rather than ransacking the West for all it's worth. In contrast with the socially accepted moral hero of 1870, the infamous outlaw first appeared in an 1877 dime novel. The outlaw was designed by dime novelists to have a split personality, and serve as a protagonist and antagonist. The outlaw both commits crimes and saves women in distress. Depending on the dime novel's premise, the outlaw could have been a hero or antagonist. It was up to the reader to decide whether the outlaw was a hero or not. In either case, the outlaw lived beyond any legal system in place in the west. Popular dime novels that still receive scholarly attention today are Charles Averill's Kit Carson stories, about an Indian slayer, mountain man, and trailblazer, and Buffalo Bill's stories of buffalo hunting and riding on the Pony Express.

=== The Demise of the Dime Novel ===
Dime novels were slowly replaced by pulp magazines at the turn of the century, and almost completely vanished by 1920. Pulp magazines were larger in size, had full-page color pictures, and served as an advertisement for growing industry. A secondary reason for the demise of the dime western was probably due to the rise of western films in the first half of the 20th century.

== See also ==
- Pulp magazine
- Dime novel
- Penny dreadful
