= Sweat lodge =

North American Indigenous structure and ceremony for prayer and healing

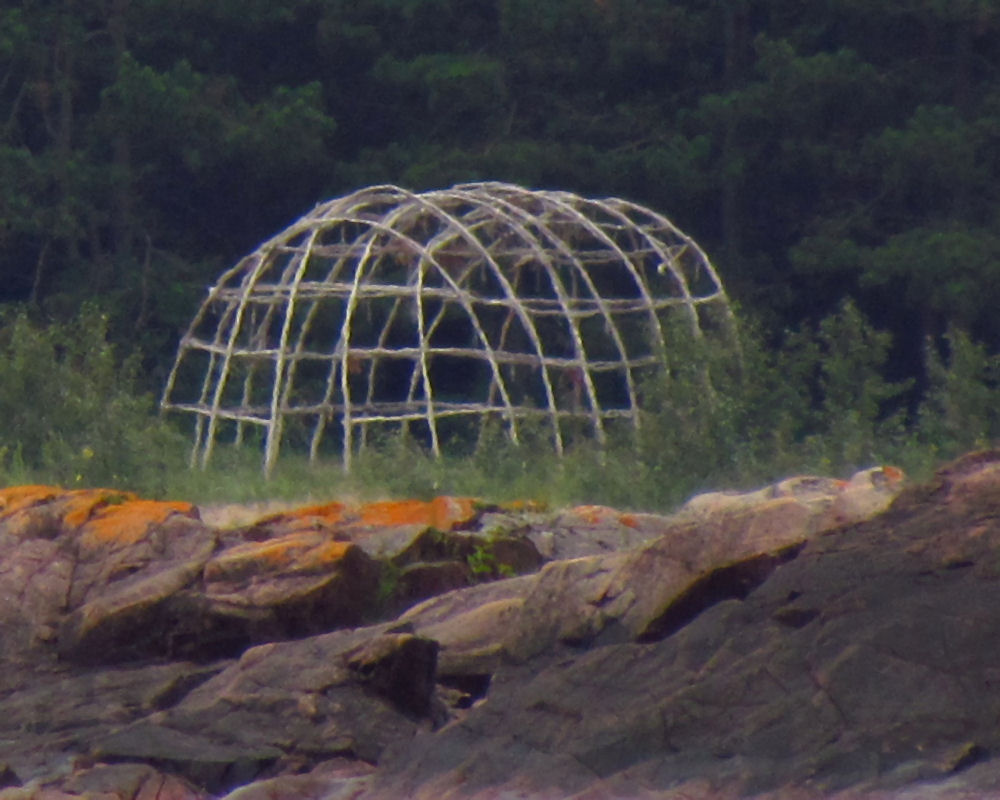
Frame for Ojibwe sweat lodge

A sweat lodge is a low profile hut, typically dome-shaped or oblong, and made with natural materials. The structure is the lodge, and the ceremony performed within the structure may be called by some cultures a purification ceremony or simply a sweat.

Traditionally the structure is simple, constructed of saplings covered with blankets and sometimes animal skins. The induction of sweating is a spiritual ceremony – it is for prayer and healing, and it is only to be led by Indigenous Elders who know the language, songs, traditions, and safety protocols of their culture's inherited tradition. Otherwise, the ceremony can be dangerous if performed improperly.

The ceremony is traditional to some Indigenous peoples of the Americas, predominantly those from the Plains cultures, but with the rise of pan-Indianism, numerous nations that did not originally have the sweat lodge ceremony have learned the ceremony from other Nations. Sweat lodges have also been imitated by many non-natives in North America and internationally, resulting in responses from Indigenous Elders declaring that these imitations are dangerous and disrespectful misappropriations.

The sweat bath was in common use among almost all the tribes north of Mexico excepting the central and eastern Eskimo, and was considered the great cure-all in sickness and invigorant in health. Among many tribes it appears to have been regarded as a ceremonial observance. The person wishing to make trial of the virtues of the sweat bath entered the â´sĭ, a small earth-covered log house only high enough to allow of sitting down. After divesting himself of his clothing, some large boulders, previously heated in a fire, were placed near him, and over them was poured a decoction of the beaten roots of the wild parsnip. The door was closed so that no air could enter from the outside, and the patient sat in the sweltering steam until he was in a profuse perspiration and nearly choked by the pungent fumes of the decoction. In accordance with general Indian practice it may be that he plunged into the river before resuming his clothing; but in modern times this part of the operation is omitted and the patient is drenched with cold water instead.

— James Mooney, Seventh Annual Report of the Bureau of Ethnology

== Traditions ==
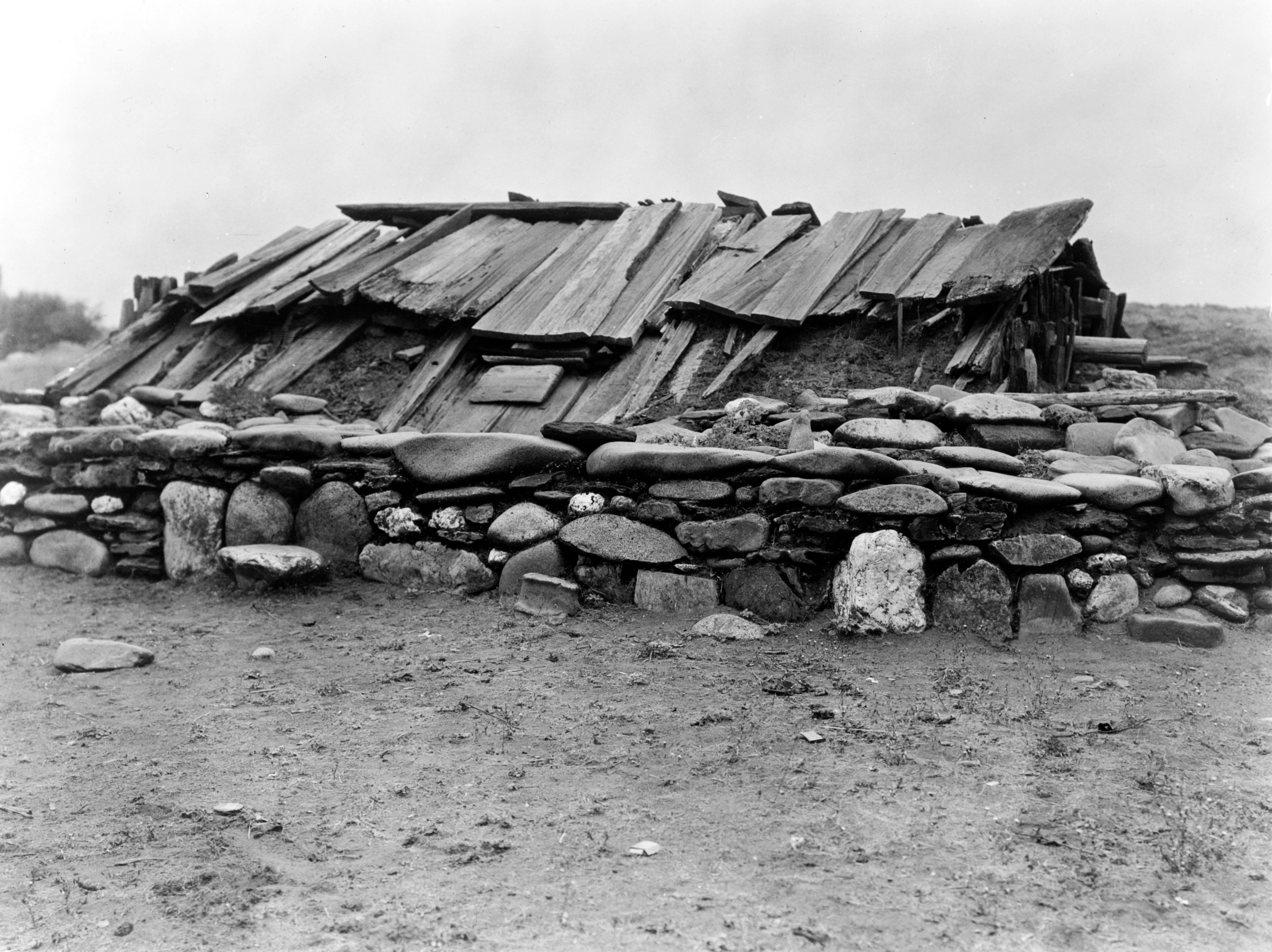
Hupa underground building covered with wood plank roof and surrounded by a wall of large rocks

Native Americans in many regions have sweat lodge ceremonies. For example, Chumash peoples of the central coast of California build sweat lodges in coastal areas in association with habitation sites. The ancient Mesoamerican tribes of Mexico, such as the Aztec and Olmec, practiced a sweat bath ceremony known as temazcal as a religious rite of penance and purification.

Traditions associated with sweating vary regionally and culturally. Ceremonies often include traditional prayers and songs. In some cultures drumming and offerings to the spirit world may be part of the ceremony, or a sweat lodge ceremony may be a part of another, longer ceremony such as a Sun Dance. Some common practices and key elements associated with sweat lodges include:

- Training – Indigenous cultures with sweat lodge traditions require that someone go through intensive training for many years to be allowed to lead a lodge. One of the requirements is that the leader be able to pray and communicate fluently in the Indigenous language of that culture, and that they understand how to conduct the ceremony safely. This leadership role is granted by the Elders of the community, not self-designated. This leadership is only entrusted to those who are full members of the community, and who live in community. It is never given to outsiders who then leave to sell ceremony.
- Orientation – The door may face a sacred fire. The cardinal directions may have symbolism in the culture that is holding the sweating ceremony. The lodge may be oriented within its environment for a specific purpose. Placement and orientation of the lodge within its environment are often considered to facilitate the ceremony's connection with the spirit world, as well as practical considerations of usage.
- Construction – The lodge is generally built with great care and knowledge, and with respect for the environment and for the materials being used.
- Clothing – In Native American lodges participants usually wear a simple garment such as shorts or a loose dress. Modesty is important, rather than display.

Some participants will go nude as it is considered the “traditional” way.

== Risks ==
=== Physical effects ===
Even people who are experienced with sweat rituals, or who attend a ceremony led by a properly trained and authorized traditional Native American ceremonial leader, could suddenly experience problems due to underlying health issues. It is recommended by Lakota spiritual leaders that people only attend lodges with authorized, traditional spiritual leaders.

There have been reports of lodge-related deaths resulting from overexposure to heat, dehydration, smoke inhalation, or improper lodge construction leading to suffocation.

If rocks are used, it is important not to use river rocks, or other kinds of rocks with air pockets inside them. Rocks must be completely dry before heating. Rocks with air pockets or excessive moisture could crack and possibly explode in the fire or when hit by water. Previously used rocks may absorb humidity or moisture leading to cracks or shattering.

=== Deaths ===
The following is a list of reported deaths related to non-traditional "New Age" sweat rituals:

- Gordon Reynolds, 43 (died November 21, 1996)
- Kirsten Babcock, 34 (died 2002)
- David Thomas Hawker, 36 (died 2002)
- Rowen Cooke, 37 (died 2004)
- Paige Martin, 57 (died July 17, 2009)
- Kirby Brown, 38, of Westtown, NY (died October 9, 2009, at retreat led by James Arthur Ray)
- Lizbeth Neuman, 49, of Prior Lake, MN (died October 17, 2009, due to injuries sustained at retreat led by James Arthur Ray)
- James Shore, 40, of Milwaukee, WI (died October 9, 2009, at event led by James Arthur Ray)
- Chantal Lavigne, 35, (died July 2011 in Sherbrooke, Québec, after event led by Gabrielle Fréchette)

=== Sedona deaths and Lakota Nation lawsuit ===
In October 2009, during a New Age retreat organized by James Arthur Ray, three people died and 21 more became ill while attending an overcrowded and improperly set up sweat lodge containing some 60 people and located near Sedona, Arizona. Ray was arrested by the Yavapai County Sheriff's Office in connection with the deaths on February 3, 2010, and bond was set at $5 million. In response to these deaths, Lakota spiritual leader Arvol Looking Horse issued a statement reading in part:

Our First Nations People have to earn the right to pour the mini wic'oni (water of life) upon the inyan oyate (the stone people) in creating Inikag'a – by going on the vision quest for four years and four years Sundance. Then you are put through a ceremony to be painted – to recognize that you have now earned that right to take care of someone's life through purification. They should also be able to understand our sacred language, to be able to understand the messages from the Grandfathers, because they are ancient, they are our spirit ancestors. They walk and teach the values of our culture; in being humble, wise, caring and compassionate. What has happened in the news with the make shift sauna called the sweat lodge is not our ceremonial way of life!

On November 2, 2009, the Lakota Nation filed a lawsuit against the United States, Arizona State, James Arthur Ray, and Angel Valley Retreat Center site owners, to have Ray and the site owners arrested and punished under the Sioux Treaty of 1868 between the United States and the Lakota Nation. That treaty states that “if bad men among the whites or other people subject to the authority of the United States shall commit any wrong upon the person or the property of the Indians, the United States will (...) proceed at once to cause the offender to be arrested and punished according to the laws of the United States, and also reimburse the injured person for the loss sustained.”

The Lakota Nation holds that James Arthur Ray and the Angel Valley Retreat Center have “violated the peace between the United States and the Lakota Nation” and have caused the “desecration of our Sacred Oinikiga (purification ceremony) by causing the death of Liz Neuman, Kirby Brown and James Shore”. As well, the Lakota claim that James Arthur Ray and the Angel Valley Retreat Center fraudulently impersonated Indians and must be held responsible for causing the deaths and injuries, and for evidence destruction through dismantling of the sweat lodge. The lawsuit seeks to have the treaty enforced and does not seek monetary compensation.

Preceding the lawsuit, Native American experts on sweat lodges criticized the reported construction and conduct of the lodge as not meeting traditional ways ("bastardized", "mocked" and "desecrated"). Indian leaders expressed concerns and prayers for the dead and injured. The leaders said the ceremony is their way of life and not a religion. It is Native American property protected by U.S. law and United Nations declaration. The ceremony should only be in sanctioned lodge carriers' hands from legitimate nations. Traditionally, a typical leader has 4 to 8 years of apprenticeship before being allowed to care for people in a lodge, and have been officially named as ceremonial leaders before the community. Participants are instructed to call out whenever they feel uncomfortable, and the ceremony is usually stopped to help them. The lodge was said to be unusually built from non-breathable materials. Charging for the ceremony was said to be inappropriate. The number of participants was criticized as too high and the ceremony length was said to be too long. Respect to elders' oversight was said to be important for avoiding unfortunate events. The tragedy was characterized as "plain carelessness", with a disregard for the participants' safety and outright negligence. The Native American community actively seeks to prevent abuses of their traditions. Organizers have been discussing ways to formalize guidance and oversight to authentic or independent lodge leaders.

== Similar structures and rites in other cultures ==
There are examples of ritual sweating in other cultures, though often without any ceremonial or mystical significance. Secular uses around the world include many forms including Ancient Roman baths, steambath, sauna, Russian banya, the culturally important Islamic hammam, and the heated dry air Victorian Turkish bath. Other varieties are used by Indigenous people around the Bering Strait, ancient Greeks, the Finns and the Sámi.

Some European cultures have historically used sweating for cleansing. In most cases the usage is primarily for physical cleansing and warmth, but in others prayer and songs may be involved. Scandinavian, Baltic and Eastern European cultures incorporate sweat baths in their sauna traditions, which are held within a permanent, wooden hut. While modern-day saunas are wholly secular, there are older traditions of songs and rituals in the sauna, and the acknowledgment of a spirit-being who lives in the sauna.

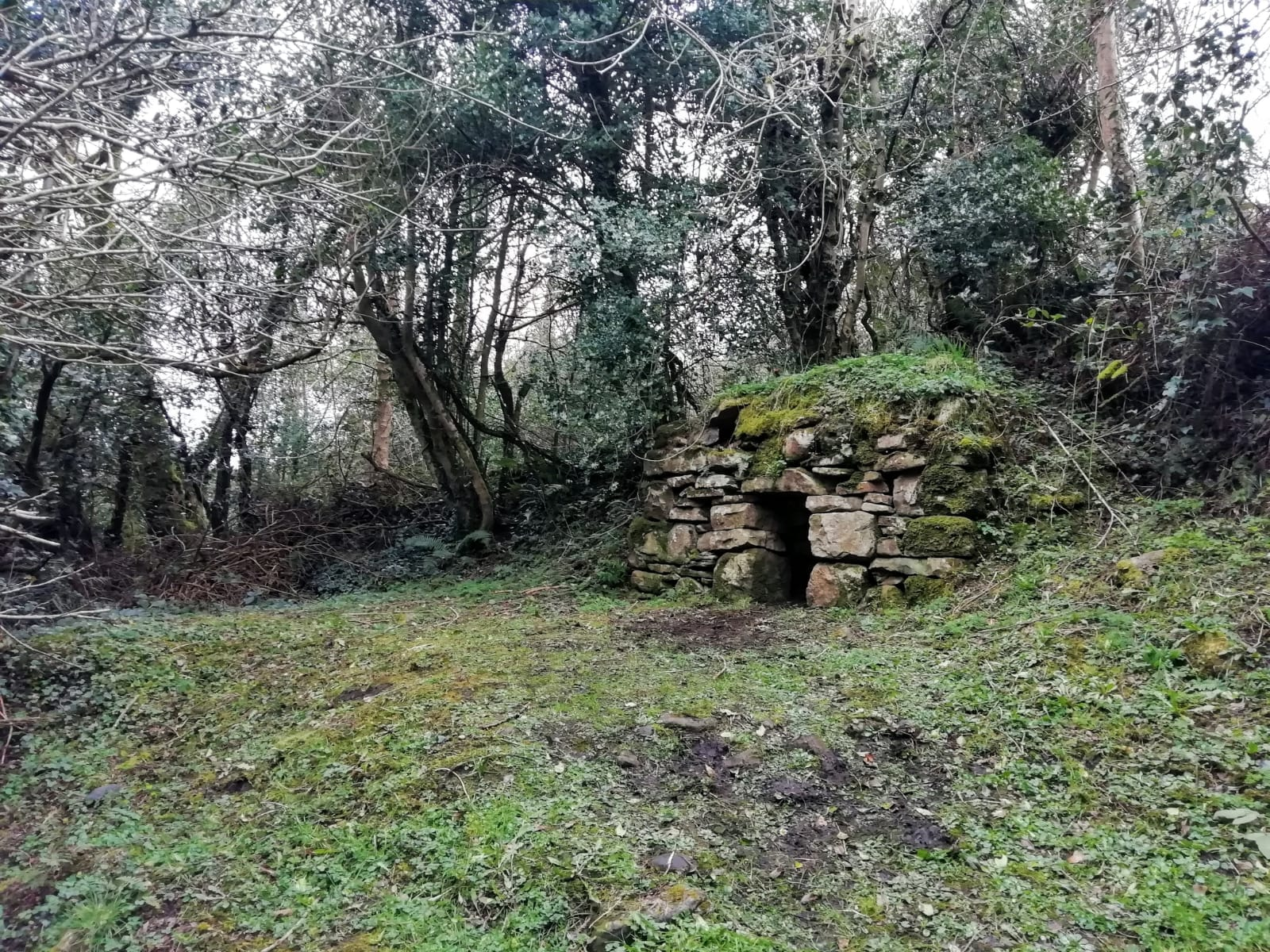
A sweat-house

"Vapour baths were in use among the Celtic tribes, and the sweat-house was in general use in Ireland down to the 18th, and even survived into the 19th century. It was of beehive shape and was covered with clay. It was especially resorted to as a cure for rheumatism." These permanent structures were built of stone, and square or corbelled "beehive" versions are often found, mostly in the Irish and Gaelic-speaking areas of Ireland and Scotland, though most seem of relatively recent date. The method of construction, heating the structure, and usage was different from the North American examples, and they seem to have been regarded as therapeutic in function, like the sauna, and perhaps typically used by one person at a time, given their small size.

== See also ==
- Andiruna
- Cultural appropriation
- Inipi
- Plastic shaman
- Puyallup people
- Sauna
- Temazcal
- The red road and Great Race (Native American legend)
- Sentō
- Banya (sauna)

== Bibliography ==
- Bucko, Raymond A. (1998). The Lakota Ritual Of The Sweat Lodge:: History and Contemporary Practice. University of Nebraska Press. ISBN 978-0-8032-1272-5.
