= Mourning Dove (author) =

American novelist

Christine Quintasket
- Hum-ishu-ma
- Mourning Dove, c. 1915

Okanagan (Syilx), Arrow Lakes (Sinixit), and Colville leader

Personal details
- Born: c. 1884–1888 near Bonners Ferry, Idaho
- Died: August 8, 1936 (aged 51–52) Medical Lake, Washington
- Cause of death: Flu
- Resting place: Omak Memorial Cemetery, WA
- Spouse: Hector McLeod (Flathead) Fred Galler (Wenatchee)
- Parent: Joseph Quintasket (father); Lucy Stukin (mother)
- Known for: Writing books: Cogewea: The Half-Blood (1927); Coyote Stories (1933); Tales of the Okanogans (1976) Mourning Dove: A Salishan Autobiography (1990)
- Nickname: Mourning Dove

Mourning Dove (Note: Humishuma (Mourning Dove – not a direct translation), as provided by Mourning Dove herself in her introduction to Cogewea: "The whiteman must have invented the name for it as Mourning Dove because the translation to Indian is not word for word at all." Okanogan women names refer to water, not birds or animals.) (born Christine Quintasket) or Humishuma was a Native American (Okanogan (Syilx), Arrow Lakes (Sinixt), and Colville) author, activist, and one of the first Native American women to publish a novel in the United States, best known for her 1927 novel Cogewea, the Half-Blood: A Depiction of the Great Montana Cattle Range and her 1933 work Coyote Stories.

Cogewea was one of the first novels to be written by a Native American woman and to feature a female protagonist. It explores the lives of Cogewea, a mixed-blood heroine whose ranching skills, riding prowess, and bravery are noted and respected by the primarily mixed-race cowboys on the ranch on the Flathead Indian Reservation. The eponymous main character hires an inexperienced easterner, Alfred Densmore, who has designs on Cogewea's land, which she had received as head of household in an allotment under the Dawes Act.

Coyote Stories (1933) is a collection of what Mourning Dove called Native American folklore.

== Name ==
Quintasket was born between 1884 and 1888 to Joseph Quintasket and Lucy Stukin. Quintasket was a surname her father had taken from his stepfather. She also was given an indigenous name, Humishuma.

Mourning Dove was a pen name chosen in adulthood when Quintasket decided to become a writer. The name was based on Colville traditional stories, Mourning Dove being the wife of Salmon who is the sustenance of life. Initially using the spelling Morning Dove, she corrected it after having visited a museum in Spokane.

== Background ==
Humishuma, also known as Christine Quintasket, was born "in the Moon of Leaves" (April) 1888 in a canoe on the Kootenai River near Bonners Ferry, Idaho.

Her mother Lucy Stukin was of Sinixt (Lakes) and Colville (Skoyelpi) ancestry. Lucy was the daughter of Sinixt Chief Seewhelken and a Colville woman. Christine spent much time with her maternal Colville grandmother, learning storytelling from her.

Christine's father was Joseph Quintasket, a mixed-race Okanagan. His mother Nicola was Okanagan and his father was Irish. He grew up with his mother and stepfather. While living at the Colville Reservation, Christine Quintasket was enrolled as Sinixt (Lakes), but she identified as Okanogan. The tribes shared related languages and some culture.

Humishuma learned English in school. She attended the Sacred Heart School at the Goodwin Mission in Ward, near Kettle Falls, Washington and later the Fort Shaw Industrial Indian School near Great Falls, Montana where she was a teacher's aide. After reading The Brand: A Tale of the Flathead Reservation by Theresa Broderick, she was inspired to become a writer. Her command of the English language made her valued by her fellow Natives, and she advised local Native leaders. She also became active in Native politics. She helped the Okanogan tribe to gain money that was owed them.

=== Personal life ===
Quintasket married Hector McLeod, a member of the Flathead people. While married to McLeod she attended Calgary College in Alberta where she studied business and composition. When McLeod proved to be an abusive husband; they separated. In 1919, she married again, to Fred Galler of the Wenatchi.

Quintasket died from the flu on 8 August 1936 at the state hospital in Medical Lake, Washington.

== Cogewea, the Half-Blood ==
Front cover of the University of Nebraska 1981 trade paperback edition of the book Cogewea by Mourning Dove.

Mourning Dove's 1927 novel explores a theme common in early Native American fiction: the plight of the mixedblood (or "breed"), who lives in both white and Indian cultures. Typically mixed-race Native Americans had Indian mothers and white fathers. Many such unions originated between fur traders or trappers and indigenous women. Later other explorers also married Native American women. There were strong alliances created between tribes and traders in the marriage of their daughters to Europeans.

In the novel, Cogewea has two sisters Julia (older) and Mary. After their Okanogan mother dies, their white father leaves them to join the Alaskan gold rush, joining tens of thousands of men migrating there. Their maternal grandmother Stemteemä raises the girls as Okanogan. After Julia marries a white rancher, she takes in her younger sisters at his ranch located within the boundaries of the Flathead Indian Reservation. (Many whites purchased properties within reservations in the West.)

Cogewea is soon courted by Alfred Densmore, a white suitor from the East Coast, and James LaGrinder, the ranch foreman, who is mixed race. Her sisters had opposing views of these men: Julia approves of Densmore but Mary is suspicious of him. The novel concludes with Cogewea and Jim forming a relationship.

== Background ==
Mourning Dove collaborated on this work with her editor Lucullus Virgil McWhorter, a white man who studied and advocated for Native Americans.

Mourning Dove was a new author, and she felt that McWhorter as editor greatly changed her book. In one of her letters to him, she wrote:

"I have just got through going over the book 'Cogewea,' and am surprised at the changes that you made. I think they are fine, and you made a tasty dressing like a cook would do with a fine meal. I sure was interested in the book, and hubby read it over and also all the rest of the family neglected their housework till they read it cover to cover. I felt like it was some one else's book and not mine at all. In fact the finishing touches are put there by you, and I have never seen it".

Mourning Dove agreed to the changes, later writing to him: "My book of Cogewea would never have been anything but the cheap foolscap paper that it was written on if you had not helped me get it in shape. I can never repay you back."

The novel is one of the earliest written by a Native American woman and published in the United States, and one of the earliest novels by a Native American to feature a female protagonist. It followed Wynema, a Child of the Forest (1891) by Muscogee (Creek) author Sophia Alice Callahan, which was rediscovered in the late 20th century and published in 1997 in a scholarly edition.

A scholarly edition of Cogewea was published by the University of Nebraska Press in 1981 and has yet to be out of print. Scholars have interpreted the novel as an early critique of stereotypical representations of Native Americans in American literature, as well as a response to non-Indigenous portrayals of reservation life.

Front cover (dust jacket) of the Caxton Printers 1933 first edition of the book Coyote Stories by Mourning Dove.

== Coyote Stories ==
In 1933, Mourning Dove published Coyote Stories, a collection of legends told to her by her grandmother and other tribal elders.

The foreword by Chief Standing Bear in this book includes these words: "These legends are of America, as are its mountains, rivers, and forests, and as are its people. They belong!"

== Literary influences ==
Mourning Dove learned storytelling from her maternal grandmother, and from Teequalt, an elder who lived with her family when the girl was young. She was also influenced by pulp-fiction novels, which her adopted brother Jimmy Ryan let her read. She cited the novel The Brand: A Tale of the Flathead Reservation by Therese Broderick as inspiring her to begin writing. She was moved to counter what she thought was a derogatory representation of indigenous culture in Broderick's novel.

== Reception ==
Mourning Dove’s work has received increased scholarly attention in the late 20th and early 21st centuries, particularly in the fields of Native American studies and literature. Critics have emphasized her role as a pioneering Indigenous author and her contributions to representing Native perspectives in early American fiction.

== Legacy and impact ==
Mourning Dove is considered one of the first Native American women to publish a novel in the United States. Her work has been recognized for contributing to early Native American literature and for presenting Indigenous perspectives during a period when such voices were often excluded from mainstream publishing. Scholars have noted her role in bridging Indigenous storytelling traditions and Western literary forms. Her work has also been studied in the context of early 20th-century Indigenous resistance to assimilation policies and literary marginalization.

== Works ==
- Cogewea: The Half-Blood (1927)
- Coyote Stories (1933) (27 stories) (229 pages)

In Spanish as: Cuentos Indios del Coyote, Paloma Triste (Mourning Dove)
Shorter (17 stories) English version as: Mourning Dove's Stories (Note: The 17 stories are: 1. "Ant"; 2. "Rivals last stand"; 3. "Legend of Omak lake"; 4. "Lynx and wife"; 5. "Lynx the hunter"; 6. "One who follows"; 7. "How disease came to the people"; 8. "Coyote the medicine man"; 9. "Coyote's daughter"; 10. "Coyote and fox"; 11. "Blind dog monster"; 12. "Coyote is punished"; 13. "Wooing grizzly bear"; 14. "Coyote and whale monster"; 15. "North wind monster"; 16. "Coyote brings the salmon"; 17. "Salmon and rattlesnake") (117 pages) (1991)

- Tales of the Okanogans (1976)
- Mourning Dove: A Salishan Autobiography (1990)

== See also ==
- List of writers from peoples indigenous to the Americas
- Native American Studies
