= James Arthur Ray =

American media personality (1957–2025)

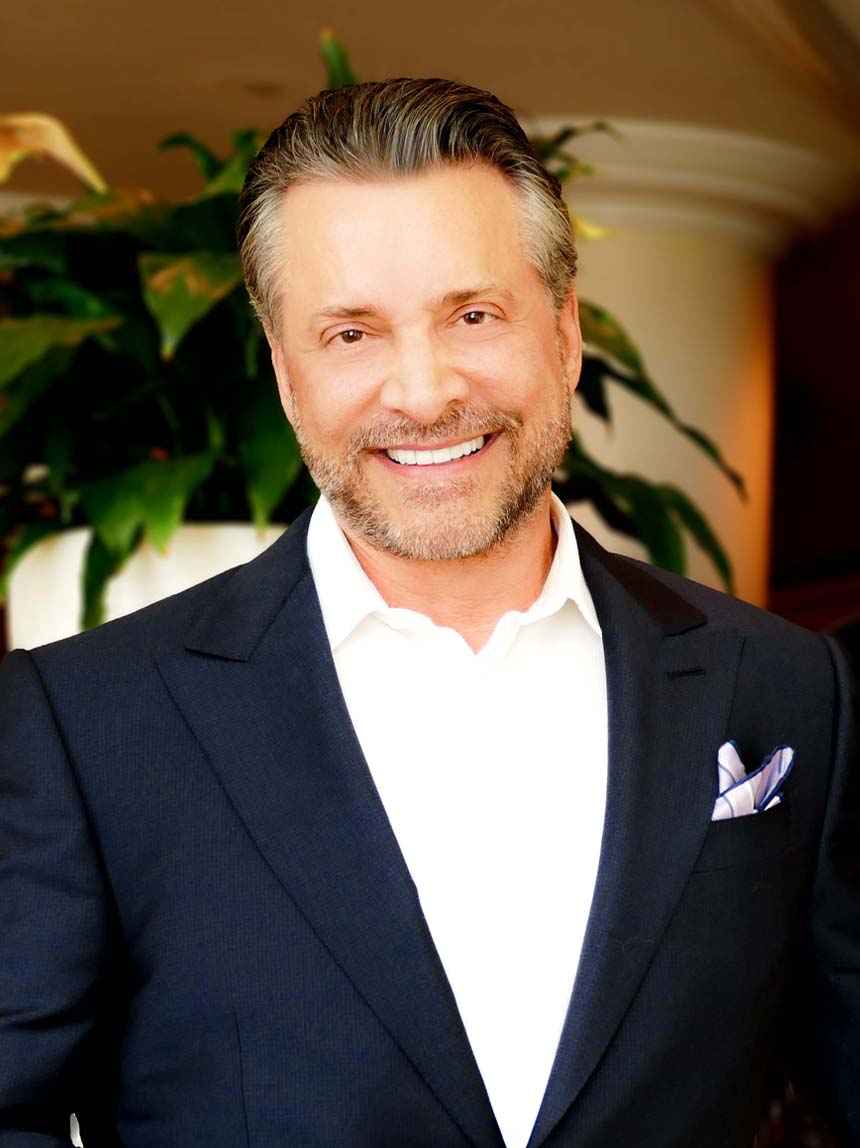
- Ray in 2017
- Born: November 22, 1957; Honolulu, Hawaii Territory, U.S.
- Died: January 3, 2025 (aged 67); Henderson, Nevada, U.S.
- Occupation: Author, businessman, self-help coach
- Years active: 1992–2025
- Spouse: Bersabeh
- Criminal information
- Status: sentence served at Arizona State Prison Complex – Phoenix
- Conviction: Negligent homicide (3 counts)
- Penalty: 2 years imprisonment

James Arthur Ray (November 22, 1957 – January 3, 2025) was an American self-help businessman, motivational speaker, author and convicted felon who was found guilty in 2011 of causing three deaths through negligent homicide.

A former telemarketer, Ray taught Stephen Covey motivational seminars while employed at AT&T and claimed he later worked two years for the Covey foundation; however the company has no record of him as an employee or contractor. In 2006 he appeared on CNN's Larry King Live and was one of several narrators in the film The Secret. He also appeared on the Today Show and Oprah.

In October 2009, three participants died while taking part in a ritual, led by Ray, at one of his New Age retreats. Ray was arrested in 2010, and in 2011 convicted of three counts of negligent homicide. He served two years in Arizona state prison and was released under supervision on July 12, 2013. Following his release, Ray re-launched his self-help business.

== Early life ==
Ray was born in Honolulu on November 22, 1957, while his father was stationed there in the U.S. Navy. He grew up in Tulsa, Oklahoma, where his father was a preacher at the Red Fork Church of God. Ray described his childhood as impoverished, claiming that, "The hardest part of my childhood was reconciling how Dad poured his heart into his work, how he helped so many people and yet he couldn't afford to pay for haircuts for me and my brother," in his 2008 book Harmonic Wealth. A classmate of Ray's recalled that, "Ray always dressed well and knew he'd make something of himself."

He dropped out of junior college in 1978 and eventually started working at AT&T, initially as a telemarketer, later as a sales manager and trainer. He started his own seminars and motivational speaker events in the early 1990s, launching his first company in 1992. Ray set up the now defunct James Ray International, Inc. in Las Vegas in 2000.

== Self-help and pseudoscientific methods ==
Ray was an advocate of the pseudoscientific Law of Attraction; his teachings have been described as "including a mix of spirituality, motivational speaking, and quantum physics". In an interview, Ray answered about personal responsibility, "I fully know, for me, that there is no blame. Every single thing is your responsibility ... and nothing is your fault. Because every single thing that comes to you is gift ... a lesson."

Ray advocated for the New Thought belief that positive thinking can heal physical ailments, and claimed to have used willpower to stay free of all illness. Writing for The Guardian, Andrew Gumbel described the pseudoscientific claims as "quantum flapdoodle", "because it claims to be rooted in Heisenberg's uncertainty principle and other tenets of modern physics".

=== Early safety concerns ===
Concerns were raised starting in 2000 regarding the safety and soundness of his methods.

Former attendees of Ray's seminars reported unsafe practices and lack of properly trained medical staff in 2005. A New Jersey woman shattered her hand after she was pressured by Ray to participate in a quasi-martial arts board-breaking exercise. After several unsuccessful untrained attempts, the woman sustained multiple fractures during the seminar that was held at Walt Disney World.

Also in 2005 a serious injury involving hospitalization was reported at the Angel Valley Ranch during a "Spiritual Warrior" retreat led by Ray. Verde Valley Fire Chief Jerry Doerksen's department responded to an emergency call that a 42-year-old man had fallen unconscious after exercises inside a sweat lodge.

Participants of a James Ray "Spiritual Warrior" exercise in 2006, after signing waivers, were told to put the sharp point of an arrow used in archery against the soft part of their necks and lean against the tip. A man named Kurt sustained injuries during this exercise as the shaft snapped and the arrow point deeply penetrated his eyebrow.

In July 2009, Colleen Conaway attended a seminar hosted by James Ray International, Inc. in which the attendees were directed to dress as homeless people. She jumped to her death at the Horton Plaza Mall in San Diego. She died as a result of injuries, and according to police, she had no identification on her person.

== "Sweat lodge" deaths ==
On October 8, 2009, at a New Age "Spiritual Warrior" retreat conceived and hosted by Ray at the Angel Valley Retreat Center in Yavapai County near Sedona, Arizona, two participants, James Shore and Kirby Brown, died as a result of being in a nontraditional sweat lodge exercise for several hours, personally conducted by Ray. Eighteen others were hospitalized after suffering burns, dehydration, breathing problems, kidney failure, or elevated body temperature. Liz Neuman, another attendee, died on October 17 after being comatose for a week.

The attendees, who had paid up to $10,000 to participate in the retreat, had fasted for 36 hours during what was claimed to be a vision quest exercise before the next day's purported sweat lodge. During this period of fasting, participants were left alone in the Arizona desert with a sleeping bag, although Ray had offered them Peruvian ponchos for an additional $250. After this experience, participants ate a large buffet breakfast before entering the nontraditional structure built for what they had been told would be a sweat lodge ceremony. The site owner reported she learned after the event that participants went two days without water before entering the structure.

=== Investigation and conviction on charges of negligent homicide ===
Following the deaths, Ray refused to speak to authorities and immediately left Arizona. According to participants in the heat endurance exercise (which was misrepresented by both Ray and his organization as a "Native American sweat lodge ceremony"), a note was left that said Ray was unavailable—as he was in "prayer and meditation". Ray later confirmed, during a 2013 interview with Piers Morgan, that he fled the scene rather than staying to assist with the aftermath, because "I was scared."

Investigations were commenced by the Yavapai County Sheriff department. Initial investigations concerned construction of the "sweat lodge" structure which, according to investigators, was constructed by a local (non-Native American) group under hire. Jack Judd, the county building safety manager, said that there was no record of a permit or an application for a permit to build the exceptionally large and nontraditional structure used for the "sweat lodge" event.

On October 15, 2009, after extensive interviews with participants and ancillary witnesses, the Yavapai County sheriff's office upgraded the level of the investigations into the deaths of James Shore and Kirby Brown to a 'homicide investigation'. Officials claimed the nontraditional "sweat lodge" structure lacked the necessary building permits. Print media began reporting that Ray conducted a conference call with some victims, one of whom recorded the call and provided it to the AP. During this call, a self-described channeler said that they had communicated with the dead and they had said they "were having so much fun" out of their bodies that they did not want to return. On October 27, Minnesota Senator Amy Klobuchar asked the U.S. Department of Justice and the Federal Trade Commission (FTC) to investigate the event to complement the local investigations. On October 30, a wrongful death lawsuit claiming negligence, negligent misrepresentation, fraud and other actions on the part of Ray and the site owners was filed for the family of Liz Neuman. A similar action was filed for Sidney Spencer who was seriously injured. The suits sought compensatory and punitive damages alleging that defendants failed to provide adequate prior warnings, to monitor the participants' wellbeing in the "sweat lodge", and to provide medical treatment. On November 10, Dennis Mehravar, an injured attendee from Canada, joined the Spencer suit.

Ray was arrested in connection with the deaths on February 3, 2010, and bond was set at $5 million. Ray's attorney argued that he could not afford the $5 million, and Ray was released on February 26, 2010, after bail was reduced to $525,000.

Three of the victims' lawsuits against Ray were settled before his criminal trial for a total of more than $3 million.

The court case began on May 1, 2011. The prosecution rested its case on June 3, 2011, after 34 witnesses had taken the stand and 43 days of testimony. On June 22, 2011, Ray was found guilty on three counts of negligent homicide, and not guilty of the manslaughter charges brought against him; the finding specifically stated that Ray was responsible for causing the deaths of the three participants, whether or not he was aware of the risks he had subjected them to. On November 18, 2011, Ray was sentenced to two years in prison.

=== Native American perspective ===
Native American and First Nations experts on sweat lodges criticized Ray's construction of the structure used for the fraudulent ceremony, as well as his ignorance and misrepresentation of actual sweat lodge ceremonies. As Indian Country Today reported, "Ray drew the ire of Indian country from the start because the ceremony which he was selling bore little if any resemblance to an actual sweat lodge ceremony." Native American leaders expressed shock, outrage and dismay that people had been killed in something misrepresented as a Native ceremony, and offered prayers for the dead and injured. The leaders say the real sweat lodge ceremony is a part of their way of life and not a commodity, nor should it ever be a life-threatening event. It is Native American intellectual property, protected by US laws and the United Nations Declaration on the Rights of Indigenous Peoples. The ceremony should only be conducted by sanctioned lodge members who are from legitimate nations and who have been thoroughly trained in both spiritual and physical safety protocols.

Lakota spiritual leader Chief Arvol Looking Horse emphasized that what Ray inflicted on his new age customers was not an authentic Native American ceremony, that Ray had no connection to any Native American community, and no training in how to lead an actual sweat lodge (permission to lead lodges is only granted to those who have been raised in the ceremonial ways of a particular Native American community, and after many years of apprenticeship with Elders); other dangerous actions taken by Ray, he continued, include the structure's unusual construction from non-breathable materials, charging for the ceremony (seen as extremely inappropriate), too many participants, and the excessive length of the fraudulent ceremony.

The Native American community actively seeks to prevent abuses of its traditions. According to Taliman, "Native healers and spiritual leaders have been speaking out for decades about the abuse of sacred ceremonies, and continue to oppose the appropriation and exploitation of sacred ceremonies". The Angel Valley owners announced they have accepted Native American friends' help to "heal the land". On November 12, 2009, news reported Oglala Lakotas filed a lawsuit, Oglala Lakota Delegation of the Black Hills Sioux Nation Treaty Council v. United States against the United States, Arizona, Ray and site owners, to have Ray and the site owners arrested and punished under the Sioux Treaty of 1868 between the United States and the Lakota Nation, which states that:

if bad men among the whites or other people subject to the authority of the United States shall commit any wrong upon the person or the property of the Indians, the United States will (...) proceed at once to cause the offender to be arrested and punished according to the laws of the United States, and also reimburse the injured person for the loss sustained.

The Oglala Lakota delegation believes that James Arthur Ray and the Angel Valley Retreat Center have "violated the peace between the United States and the Lakota Nation" and caused the "desecration of our Sacred Oinikiga (onikare, sweat lodge) by causing the death of Liz Neuman, Kirby Brown and James Shore".

The Oglala Lakota Delegation also claimed that James Arthur Ray and the Angel Valley Retreat Center fraudulently impersonated Indians and must be held responsible for causing the deaths of three people and injuries of nineteen others, and destroying evidence by dismantling the structure they constructed for this fatal, heat-endurance competition which they claimed was a sweat lodge ceremony. The lawsuit seeks to have the treaty enforced without seeking monetary compensation.

The lawsuit was eventually dismissed in October 2010, on the ground that the case was based on a good that was being offered, and the judge deciding that the sweat lodge was a service rather than a good.

== Release from prison and re-launch of self-help business ==
On July 12, 2013, Ray was granted a supervised release and left the state prison near Phoenix where he had served his sentence.

On November 25, 2013, Ray re-launched his self-help business on CNN's Piers Morgan Live. He had stipulated that no other guests could participate in the interview. As of December 4, 2013, Piers Morgan's manager, John Ferriter, was James Arthur Ray's manager and media contact.

Kirby Brown's parents have challenged motivational speakers and self-help gurus to sign a pledge of integrity, the "Seek Safely" promise. Ray declined to do so.

== TV documentary and true crime podcast ==
In 2016, Ray was the subject of the CNN Films' documentary Enlighten Us: The Rise and Fall of James Arthur Ray, a recount of Ray's rise to fame in the self-help industry followed by his 2011 conviction for negligent homicide and his later release from prison. In the documentary, director Jenny Carchman explores the origins of the self-help industry, what attracts followers, and tries to answer why devotees are willing to take such risks. In the film, Carchman asks Ray directly how he could have caused these people's deaths, to which he replies:

"It had to happen, because it was the only way I could experience and learn and grow through the things that I've done. [...] You come out of a situation like this and you're either bitter and angry, or you're more awake and grateful, and I choose awake and grateful, and I choose to see it as a test of character, and a test through fire, and I think I did OK."

In 2020, investigative journalist Matt Stroud produced the true crime podcast Guru: The Dark Side of Enlightenment for Wondery. In it, Stroud shines a light on Ray's methods and actions that caused the deaths of Kirby Brown, Liz Neuman and James Shore in 2009. He traces the fallout from Ray's practices, and gives voice to former followers and the families of his victims.

== Death ==
Ray died in Henderson, Nevada on January 3, 2025, at the age of 67.

== Published books ==
- The Science of Success, SunArk Press 2003, ISBN 978-0-9667400-1-1
- Practical Spirituality: How to Use Spiritual Power to Create Tangible Results, SunArk Press 2003, ISBN 978-0-9667400-3-5
- Harmonic Wealth: The Secret of Attracting the Life You Want, Hyperion Books 2008, ISBN 978-1-4013-2264-9
- The Seven Laws of True Wealth: Create the Life You Desire and Deserve, Hyperion Books Books 2009, ISBN 978-1-4013-2284-7
- The Science of Success, Embassy Books 2017, ISBN 978-9-3864500-9-8
- The Business of Redemption: The Price of Leadership in Both Life and Business, Morgan James Publishing 2020, ISBN 978-1-6427947-9-3

== See also ==
- The Chantal Lavigne case, involving the 2011 death of a Canadian woman in similar circumstances.
- Indian Arts and Crafts Act of 1990
- Large-group awareness training
- Neoshamanism
- Plastic shaman
