= Tough Trip Through Paradise =

1967 autobiography by Andrew Garcia

- Author: Andrew Garcia
- Translator: The first edition of Andrew Garcia's memoir, with Garcia himself on the cover.
- Language: English
- Genre: Autobiography
- Publisher: Houghton Mifflin
- Publication date: January 1, 1967
- Publication place: United States
- Media type: Print (Hardcover)
- Pages: 446
- OCLC: 576084564

Tough Trip Through Paradise 1878-1879 is the autobiography of Andrew Garcia (1853–1943), a man of Hispanic descent who was born in El Paso, but moved north to Montana in 1876 and became a mountain man. He wrote down his story in his later years, but never seriously sought publication due to a combination of disapproval from family members and fear of his story being exploited by dime novelists. The book covers Garcia's time in Montana from 1878 through 1879.

Garcia served as a herder and packer for the U.S. Army in Montana in the Yellowstone and Musselshell country, working for Colonel Samuel D. Sturgis' "Boys in Blue" out of Fort Ellis from 1876 to 1878. He was present during the Nez Perce War. The book begins in 1878, when Garcia left his job with the army to go into business with a man named Beaver Tom, trapping beaver and trading for buffalo robes. While trading with members of the Pend d'Oreilles tribe, Garcia met and married a Nez Perce woman known among the Pend d'Oreille as In-who-lise ('Broken Tooth'; her original name, Kot-kot-hy-hih, means White Feather), who had been with Chief Joseph's tribe when they ran from the U.S. Cavalry. The book includes Garcia's reproduction of her firsthand account of the final engagement with 7th Infantry at the Battle of the Big Hole.

== The manuscript ==
In 1928, Andrew Garcia met historian L.V. McWhorter, who was researching the Nez Perce Indians. Garcia offered to provide information about the Nez Perce War of 1877 he had learned from his first wife, a Nez Perce woman called In-who-lise; McWhorter accepted the offer and the pair of them continued to correspond by letter until Garcia's death in 1943. Garcia continued to write throughout that time; his manuscripts include much of his life story from the 1860s through the 1880s. Garcia worked on his manuscript late at night after working on his ranch all day. The manuscript which Garcia wrote was several thousand pages long, and he declared to McWhorter that his intention was to produce a three-volume work titled In-who-lise. When Ben Stein obtained the manuscripts, they had been packed away in dynamite boxes for safekeeping.

According to one of Andrew Garcia's great-grandsons, Doug Garcia, the manuscript telling his story was not welcomed by many members of the family. Andrew Garcia's wife did not want to know about the women who had come before her, and one of his daughters-in-law, Evelyn Gladys Garcia, strongly objected to the coarse nature of the story; furthermore, Andrew's grandsons were punished for trying to sneak and read it. In 1960, the family sold the papers to Bennett H. Stein, who ultimately edited portions of some of them to create Tough Trip through Paradise 1878–1879, which was published in 1967. The manuscript remained in the possession of the Rock Foundation (founded by Bennett Stein and Hugh Galusha to keep the papers safe); after Stein's death, Dorothy Bradley (then the head of the Rock Foundation) made the decision to house the manuscripts at the Park County Museum. The foundation retained ownership of the materials, which were subsequently moved again in 2004, this time to the Montana Historical Society. The Rock Foundation was subsequently dissolved, at which time ownership of the Ben Stein research collection (including Andrew Garcia's manuscripts; materials and drafts used in Ben Stein's writing process; and correspondence and miscellaneous manuscript materials belonging to both men) passed to the Montana Historical Society. As of November 2012, the collection is open to use by researchers.
