= Lucullus Virgil McWhorter =

American farmer, frontiersman and author

- Born: January 29, 1860; Harrison County, Virginia
- Died: October 10, 1944 (aged 84); Prosser (North Yakima), Washington
- Education: Self-educated
- Occupations: Farmer, Writer, Native-American-civil-rights advocate
- Spouse(s): Adelia A. Swisher (married 1883); C. Annie Bowman (married 1895)
- Children: Ovid Tullius McWhorter (born 1884) Iris Oresta McWhorter (born 1886) Virgil Oneco McWhorter (born 1888)
- Writing career
- Language: English
- Genres: History, Anthropology
- Subjects: Nez Perce War, Yakama Nation's culture and spiritualism, Nez Perce culture
- Notable works: Hear Me, My Chiefs; Yellow Wolf, His Own Story
- Notable awards: Was given a name by the Yakama Nation, "Big Foot". Adopted into the Yakima Nation and given another name, Hemene Ka-Wan (Old Wolf).

Lucullus Virgil McWhorter (January 29, 1860 – October 10, 1944) was an American farmer and frontiersman who documented the historical Native American tribes in West Virginia and the modern-day Plateau Native Americans in Washington state. After living in West Virginia and Ohio, in 1903 he moved to the town of Yakima, Washington, in the central part of the state. He became a rancher and activist, learning much from his Yakama Nation neighbors and becoming an activist for them. In 1914 he was adopted as an honorary member of the Yakama, after helping over several years to defeat a federal bill that would have required them to give up much of their land in order to get any irrigation rights. They named him Hemene Ka-Wan,, meaning Old Wolf.

His published studies were anthropological, documenting the culture and history of the tribes. He became politically active as he represented the Plateau Native Americans against mistreatment by the United States federal government. He published accounts to report this mistreatment known to the public. He was considered an amateur in his day, but today his anthropology studies are deemed important enough to have a permanent home in Washington State University's special collections department. Current scholars describe his work as "significant" in his field, and helping to preserve the cultural heritage of the Native American tribes of the Columbia Basin. His papers are an "essential and valued resource", and the collection of his papers is "widely and intensively used." After more than 60 years, the work he did remains "extremely valuable for outreach and teaching purpose."

A reviewer of the new biography, Voice of the Old Wolf: Lucullus Virgil McWhorter and the Nez Perce Native Americans, in the Universe Magazine, Spring 1997, quoted the author, Alanna Kathleen Brown, as saying that McWhorter was an "amazingly interesting, courageous, dedicated, and insightful man." Of his accomplishments, she said: "McWhorter dedicated his energies to comprehending the cultures of the Native American tribes who surrounded him, and he committed himself to recounting the legends and epic personal stories of those he saw passing. McWhorter also continually argued for fair treatment and decency towards Native Americans whenever he could be an advocate."

== Biography ==
=== Early life ===
Lucullus V. McWhorter was born on January 29, 1860, as one of twelve children to Reverend John Minion McWhorter and Rosetta (née Marple) McWhorter in Harrison County, Virginia (an area later admitted into the union as a part of the state of West Virginia). From his childhood on, Lucullus rejected a formal education and adapted his own methods of learning through his love for nature and the outdoors. He explored historical and Native American sites and began to read widely in history and the emerging field of archeology. As a teenager, he started working in his father's beef cattle business, and had this as a part of his life in his following decades.

He married Adelia A. Swisher on March 17, 1883, and together they had three children: Ovid Tullius (born 1884), Iris Oresta (born 1886), and Virgil Oneco (born 1888). His wife Adelia died in the winter of 1893.

The widower married again in 1895. In 1897, the family moved west, from Upshur County, West Virginia, to Darke County, Ohio. Here, McWhorter continued his work as a farmer and rancher; he also continued his deep study of Native American tribes. He combined wide reading and research with engaging the Native American peoples and learning about their cultures. His studies of Native American tribes of West Virginia were significant to documenting their histories; he founded the journal, The American Archaeologist, with A. C. Gruhlke and J. R. Nissley to further his research. But McWhorter had his sights set on the American West.

=== McWhorter and the Yakama Native Americans ===
McWhorter left Fort Jefferson, Ohio, on February 26, 1903, and headed west to settle in Yakima, Washington (called North Yakima until 1918). He arrived in April and set up a ranch on the outskirts of North Yakima on the Yakima River, where he was located on a trail connecting the town to the nearby Yakima Indian Reservation. "Anyone from the reservation with any business in town soon found the McWhorter place a convenient spot to camp, and the eager McWhorter began to make friends almost at once among the Yakamas." McWhorter closely observed the Yakama culture and spiritualism, which he found to be simple and inviting. He began to question his own Christianity, which he ultimately renounced, and began a comparative study between different religions. McWhorter's frequent contact with the Yakama led to his championing their struggles against federal officials and white settlers.

The plight of the Yakama Native Americans had been well established by the time McWhorter arrived in Washington. In 1855 various Native American leaders in Washington State had signed treaties with territorial governor Isaac Stevens, ceding their lands to the federal government and agreeing to move into reservations. The Yakima Native American reservation was one of three established during this time. The treaty guaranteed the Yakama rights to their land; however, following publicity about discovery of gold in the area, miners soon converged on the Yakama reservation. The Yakama War ensued, from 1855 to 1858. It ended in 1858 with the defeat of the Yakama by United States forces. As the years progressed, whites continued to encroach on the Yakama reservation.

In 1887 Congress passed the Dawes Allotment Act, which provided for allotment of communal Native American lands in reservations to individual households in plots of 160 acres, sized for subsistence farming. It was another effort to force their assimilation to western farming styles. The government termed any lands left over after this distribution as "surplus" and allowed its sale to white settlers. This broke up the community of the reservation, and many whites worked to acquire even Yakama holdings.

In 1906, US Senator Wesley L. Jones from Washington proposed a bill in Congress to require the Yakama to give up three-fourths of their remaining land in exchange for irrigation rights. Seeing that the odds were against the Yakama, McWhorter quickly took action.

McWhorter befriended Yoom-Tee-Bee, Chief of the Yakama, and sought to aid the people in their fight to preserve their rights and land. Together, the two rode on horseback across the Yakama reservation talking to residents and encouraging them not to sign any documents for US government officials. McWhorter became a prominent figure in Yakama affairs, and was invited to sit in on tribal councils; he wrote scores of letters to congressmen as well as prominent Native American civil rights activists on the east coast to bring the struggle of the Yakama to light. In 1913, McWhorter published a pamphlet, "The Crime Against the Yakamas," detailing the long history of abuse of the Yakama at the hands of the United States government.

Chief Yoom-Tee-Bee died in 1910 but, as a result of his and McWhorter's efforts, the Jones bill died in Congress in 1914. Later that year, McWhorter received a letter of thanks from Yoom-Tee-Bee's successor, Stwire G. Watters, who wrote, "We prayed for someone like you to come to us." McWhorter was adopted as an honorary member by the Yakama tribe, being given the name Hemene Ka-Wan, meaning Old Wolf.

He continued as an active force in the Yakima reservation for the rest of his life, attending council meetings, and acting as a mediator between the Yakama and officials of the Bureau of Indian Affairs (BIA). In 1916 he published "The Continued Crime Against the Yakamas", another pamphlet about their treatment by the government. McWhorter's advocacy for Native American rights against the oppression of the US government was a lifelong mission. It contributed to his passion for recording Native American history as told from a Native American perspective.

=== McWhorter and the Nez Perce Native Americans ===
In 1907 McWhorter met Hemene Mox Mox, or Yellow Wolf, a Nez Perce man who stopped by his ranch near the Yakima River. After learning of Yellow Wolf's experiences as a warrior and veteran of the Nez Perce War of 1877, McWhorter befriended him. McWhorter saw the need to record Nez Perce accounts of their history. "To hear Yellow Wolf," he wrote, "was to be impressed by the unquestionable candor of his conviction that he and his associates were fully justified in all their actions". With a translator, McWhorter began studying Yellow Wolf's life and the history of the Nez Perce. From this work, he published two books: Yellow Wolf: His Own Story (1944) and Hear Me, My Chiefs! (1951).

Up until then, the only accounts about the Nez Perce and the War of 1877 were written by white U.S. soldiers who had fought against them. Their accounts were colored by their own perspective. General Oliver Otis Howard commanded the U.S. troops pursuing the Nez Perce during the Nez Perce War of 1877; he published his historical account as Nez Perce Joseph: An Account of His Ancestors, His Lands, His Confederates, His Enemies, His Murders, His War, His Pursuit and Capture (1881).

McWhorter wanted to present the Nez Perce perspective to help preserve their cultural identity. The Nez Perce had gone through much change since the signing of the Walla Walla treaties on June 11, 1855: "It had taken the commissioners less than a month to acquire over thirty million acres of land in three future states...and added a fresh layer to the shifting sands of Native American identity along the Columbia River". Between 1855 and 1877, the United States forced a reduction in the Nez Perce Reservation to a fraction of its original size.

After several disputes over land and resources, the Nez Perce people grew weary of the whites' influence over their land. The actions of three Nez Perce boys were the catalyst for the beginning of the Nez Perce War in 1877: "General Howard has shown us the rifle. We answer 'Yes.' We will stir up a fight for him. We will start his war!" As recounted by McWhorter, Yellow Wolf's story was the anthem of all Nez Perce who fought for their way of life and lost. He depicted the "non-treaty" Nez Perce not as savages, but as a strong people who were resisting American oppressors. In doing so, McWhorter challenged the stereotype that had long been perpetuated by Native American histories told through white eyes.

Later McWhorter worked to complete his "Field History" of the Nez Perce, which was published posthumously in 1951 as Hear Me, My Chiefs! Nez Perce History and Legend. His final piece of work covered the history of the Nez Perce in Washington State's Palouse region and the events following the end of the war of 1877. "On his deathbed, McWhorter made a request to his son, Virgil...to see his still untitled Field History through to publication." It was his dying wish that the voice of the Nez Perce people would be heard and told from their perspective. His son Virgil McWhorter completed the book in 1951.

The friendship which McWhorter developed with Yellow Wolf and the Nez Perce proved to be invaluable to his historical findings. Up to his death in 1944, McWhorter remained very active in Nez Perce relations with the Bureau of Indian Affairs. For most of his life, he had fought to preserve Native American identities, working as a persistent historian and caring friend. Without the efforts of McWhorter, the Nez Perce story would likely have been told only by white men ignorant of their traditional life and culture.

== Methods and research ==
McWhorter did not pursue a formal education. From his wide reading in literature, he was inspired to conduct research into Native American life, culture, and history. He believed that most books written about Native Americans were lacking because the authors were too distant; they had not dealt directly with Native Americans to gain their perspective. McWhorter decided to combine his passion for advocacy with writing histories of Native Americans as told by the people themselves. He had frequent encounters with local natives on his ranch, but he also sought engagement through the creation of mock Native American encampments, which toured the Pacific Northwest rodeo circuit.

The participants in this touring company wore traditional Native American dress, and performed their dances, and drumming. Native Americans from both the Nez Percé and Yakama tribes were frequent participants. McWhorter said it was because this rodeo circuit was similar to their traditional seasonal round of their former nomadic ways of life. At the rodeos, he had the opportunity to interview numerous Native Americans: "...with each rodeo or fair McWhorter learned more of the tribal oral tradition and he recorded what he heard. He well understood the unique opportunity at hand." With such multiple sources, McWhorter could cross check his facts. Facts and accounts were often repeated by multiple persons, appearing to reinforce their accuracy. Both the Native Americans and McWhorter earned income from the performances of the rodeos.

McWhorter's rodeos contrasted with the performances organized by such showmen as Buffalo Bill Cody. Instead of a "white-washed" version of the West, McWhorter's rodeos presented traditional and authentic Native American culture. It was part of his effort to educate white settlers about the peoples native to the region. McWhorter also met sympathetic contacts at these events, who shared his interest in Native American advocacy and history. At the Frontier Days celebration at Walla Walla in 1914, McWhorter met Cristal McLeod, also known as Mourning Dove. She was a mixed-race (half-blood) woman of Okanogan descent who had written, but not yet published, a semi-autobiographical novel called, Co-ge-we-a, The Half-Blood: A Depiction of the Great Montana Cattle Range. McWhorter would befriend Mourning Dove, serve as her editor, and help her publish her novel. He believed it expressed the struggle of Native American culture versus white culture, which he was also involved in.

He also met Andrew Garcia, a former mountain man and trapper. In his early life, Garcia had married a total of three Native American women. One was a Nez Perce woman who had been among those fleeing their territory with Chief Joseph. In the correspondence between them that followed their meeting, Garcia wrote several thousand pages about life in Montana and among the Native American tribes there. From this material, he published a book, Tough Trip Through Paradise. In it he provided more details about Native American encounters with the 7th US Cavalry, which hunted Chief Joseph and his followers. Garcia's work is of sufficient historical significance to be kept by the Montana Historical Society. He might not have written his account if he had not developed the friendship with McWhorter.

== Historical significance ==
McWhorter's combined a deep interest in history with advocacy of Native American rights. His curiosity and openness allowed him to befriend Native Americans. He listened to many firsthand accounts of Native American history and legends. McWhorter sought to write histories about peoples with whom he had personal relations.

In reviewing a new 1997 biography of him, Montana State University professor Alanna Kathleen Brown wrote,

For over 400 years, while Euroamericans were moving west, they pretended that they settled a "wilderness." When confronted by native peoples, the vast majority asserted the privileges of a superior race, using force and law to take what they wanted, justifying their greed as the manifestation of divine will. For Native American peoples, their coming meant the largest genocide in human history. McWhorter understood, and was appalled. He dedicated his energies to comprehending the cultures of the Native American tribes who surrounded him, and he committed himself to recounting the legends and epic personal stories of those he saw passing. McWhorter also continually argued for fair treatment and decency towards Native Americans whenever he could be an advocate. For this love, he was ridiculed and isolated by many of his own white peers.

== Works by McWhorter ==
- The Crime Against the Yakimas, (1913)
- The Border Settlers of Northwestern Virginia, from 1768 to 1795: Embracing the Life of Jesse Hughes and Other Noted Scouts of the Great Woods of the Trans-Allegheny, With notes and illustrative anecdotes, Hamilton, Ohio: Republic Publishing Company, 1915. (Many reprints); scanned copy on Internet Archive
- "Tragedy of the Wahk-Shum: The Death of Andrew J. Bolon, Yakima Indian Agent, As Told by Su-El-Lil, Eyewitness; Also, the Suicide of General George A. Custer" (published 1934, with later reprints, 47 pages)
- "The Discards" (1920, 34 pages)
- Yellow Wolf: His Own Story (1944)
- Hear Me, My Chiefs! (1951)

McWhorter also acted as an editor, collaborating with Mourning Dove, considered the first Native American woman to write a novel. She also published a collection of traditional folk tales of her people.

- Cogewea, the Half-Blood (1927) By Mourning Dove. McWhorter served as editor and made contributions to the book.
- Coyote Stories By Mourning Dove (Caldwell, Idaho: The Caxton Printers, Ltd, 1933). McWhorter served as editor and made contributions to the book.

== See also ==
- Nipo T. Strongheart
