= List of Ghost Adventures episodes =

Ghost Adventures is an American paranormal documentary and reality television series created by Zak Bagans and Nick Groff, airing on the Travel Channel. The series follows ghost hunters Zak Bagans, Nick Groff (seasons 1–10), and Aaron Goodwin as they investigate locations that are reported to be haunted. The show is introduced and narrated by Bagans. As of November 4, 2026, 299 episodes of Ghost Adventures have aired, including fifty-six specials.

== Series overview ==
Season	Episodes	Originally released		
Season	Episodes	First released	Last released	Network
1	8	October 17, 2008	December 5, 2008	Travel Channel
2	8	June 5, 2009	July 24, 2009	Travel Channel
3	10	November 6, 2009	January 8, 2010	Travel Channel
4	27	September 17, 2010	June 10, 2011	Travel Channel
5	10	September 23, 2011	December 16, 2011	Travel Channel
6	7 + 2 SPs	March 9, 2012	July 20, 2012	Travel Channel
7	18	September 14, 2012	April 19, 2013	Travel Channel
8	11	August 16, 2013	November 15, 2013	Travel Channel
9	13	February 15, 2014	July 12, 2014	Travel Channel
10	11	October 4, 2014	March 7, 2015	Travel Channel
11	11	August 22, 2015	November 7, 2015	Travel Channel
12	13	January 30, 2016	August 6, 2016	Travel Channel
13	11	September 24, 2016	December 31, 2016	Travel Channel
14	11	March 25, 2017	July 15, 2017	Travel Channel
15	11	September 23, 2017	January 13, 2018	Travel Channel
16	9	March 24, 2018	July 14, 2018	Travel Channel
17	6	November 3, 2018	December 8, 2018	Travel Channel
18	6	February 23, 2019	April 26, 2019	Travel Channel
19	7	June 8, 2019	July 20, 2019	Travel Channel
20	3	November 2, 2019	November 16, 2019	Travel Channel / Discovery+
21	12	February 27, 2020	May 14, 2020	Discovery+
22	11	November 5, 2020	April 30, 2021	Discovery+
23	6	July 22, 2021	August 26, 2021	Discovery+
24	8	March 10, 2022	April 28, 2022	Discovery Channel / Discovery+
25	10	September 15, 2022	November 24, 2022	Discovery Channel / Discovery+
26	11	June 7, 2023	August 23, 2023	Discovery Channel / Discovery+
27	5	October 11, 2023	November 8, 2023	Discovery Channel / Discovery+
28	4	May 15, 2024	June 12, 2024	Discovery Channel / Discovery+
29	5	April 23, 2025	May 21, 2025	Discovery Channel / Discovery+
30	10	October 22, 2025	December 31, 2025	Discovery Channel / Discovery+
31	6	September 30, 2026	November 4, 2026	Discovery Channel / Discovery+

== Episodes ==
=== Season 1 (2008) ===
No. overall	No. in season	Title	Location(s)	Original release date	Prod. code
1	1	"Bobby Mackey's Music World"	Wilder, Kentucky, US	October 17, 2008	1.01
In the series premiere, the crew conducts a paranormal investigation at Bobby Mackey's Music World which is reported to be home to past murder, suicide, and satanic cult activity. During the lockdown, Zak receives several scratches while attempting to provoke invisible entities.
2	2	"Houghton Mansion"	North Adams, Massachusetts, US	October 24, 2008	1.02
The crew investigates the Houghton Mansion, which is said to be one of the most haunted locations in New England.The Ghost Adventures crew come across some shadows and members of the Houghton family and beyond during this episode.
3	3	"Moundsville Penitentiary"	Moundsville, West Virginia, US	October 31, 2008	1.03
Zak and the guys spend the night locked inside the West Virginia State Penitentiary, which was abandoned in 1995 and is claimed to be haunted.
4	4	"The Riddle House"	Royal Palm Beach, Florida, US	November 7, 2008	1.04
The Riddle House in Palm Beach County, Florida, was moved from its original location in West Palm Beach to Yesteryear Village in Royal Palm Beach. Originally serving as a funeral parlor, the house became privately owned by Karl Riddle in the 1920s. The house is purported to be haunted by the spirit of Joseph, who was one of Riddle's employees and committed suicide by hanging in the attic. His ghost is alleged to dislike men and often attacks them.
5	5	"Sloss Furnaces"	Birmingham, Alabama, US	November 14, 2008	1.05
The guys investigate Birmingham, Alabama's Sloss Furnaces, a decommissioned factory purported to be haunted by deceased iron workers.
6	6	"Abandoned Psychiatric Hospital"	Cedar Grove, New Jersey, US	November 21, 2008	1.06
The crew investigated the abandoned psychiatric hospital, which is officially called the Essex County Hospital Center. Note: Due to privacy concerns, the hospital's name and location were never revealed in the episode.
7	7	"Edinburgh Vaults"	Edinburgh, Scotland, UK	November 28, 2008	1.07
The crew travels to Scotland to investigate reports of paranormal activity in old underground vaults, known as the Edinburgh Vaults, beneath the city's South Bridge.
8	8	"Idaho State Penitentiary"	Boise, Idaho, US	December 5, 2008	1.08
The crew investigates Boise, Idaho's Old Idaho State Penitentiary which is said to be haunted by the ghosts of dead convicts.

=== Season 2 (2009) ===
No. overall	No. in season	Title	Location(s)	Original release date	Prod. code
1	1	"Preston Castle"	Ione, California, US	June 5, 2009	2.01
In the second season premiere, the crew heads to Ione, California, to investigate Preston Castle, a former reformatory school. Also this is Zak's first spirit channel (spirit possession), who he believed that it was the spirit of Anna Corbin.
2	2	"Castillo De San Marcos"	St. Augustine, Florida, US	June 12, 2009	2.02
The Ghost Adventures Crew (GAC) travels to St. Augustine, Florida, to investigate the Castillo de San Marcos, a 17th-century Spanish fort.
3	3	"La Purisima Mission"	Lompoc, California, US	June 19, 2009	2.03
Zak, Nick, and Aaron go to Lompoc, California, to investigate claims of hauntings at the La Purisima Mission.
4	4	"Magnolia Plantation"	Natchitoches, Louisiana, US	June 26, 2009	2.04
GAC investigates claims of voodoo rituals purported to have been used by slaves to get revenge on their owners at the Magnolia Plantation located in Natchitoches, Louisiana.
5	5	"Birdcage Theater"	Tombstone, Arizona, US	July 3, 2009	2.05
Zak, Nick, and Aaron head to the historic Birdcage Theater in Tombstone, Arizona, to search for paranormal activity.
6	6	"Eastern State Penitentiary"	Philadelphia, Pennsylvania, US	July 10, 2009	2.06
Zak and the guys travel to Philadelphia, to investigate the decommissioned Eastern State Penitentiary, one of the country's oldest standing prisons.
7	7	"Moon River Brewing Company"	Savannah, Georgia, US	July 17, 2009	2.07
The crew heads to Savannah, Georgia, purported to be one of the country's most haunted cities to investigate claims of paranormal activity at the Moon River Brewing Company.
8	8	"Ancient Ram Inn"	Wotton-under-Edge, Gloucestershire, England, UK	July 24, 2009	2.08
Zak, Nick, and Aaron go to England to investigate claims of supernatural occurrences, including the legend of a murderous witch and the incubus and succubus, at the Ancient Ram Inn built in the 12th century over a pagan burial ground.

=== Season 3 (2009–10) ===
No. overall	No. in season	Title	Location(s)	Original release date	Prod. code
1	1	"Ghost Adventures Live – The Trans-Allegheny Lunatic Asylum"	Weston, West Virginia, US	October 30, 2009	3.01
The crew spends seven hours locked inside the Trans-Allegheny Lunatic Asylum in Weston, West Virginia. The former psychiatric hospital is said to be one of the country's most haunted sites. Note: This episode is not available on Discovery+
2	2	"Pennhurst State School"	Spring City, Pennsylvania, US	November 6, 2009	3.02
The crew visits the abandoned Pennhurst State School and Hospital, a former mental asylum in Spring City, Pennsylvania, that closed its doors in 1987.
3	3	"Poveglia Island"	Venice, Veneto, Italy	November 13, 2009	3.03
The crew investigates the paranormal occurrences on Poveglia, a small island near Venice, Italy.
4	4	"Ohio State Reformatory"	Mansfield, Ohio, US	November 20, 2009	3.04
The crew investigates the Ohio State Reformatory, which in the 94 years it was open, housed more than 155,000 criminals.
5	5	"Remington Arms Factory"	Bridgeport, Connecticut, US	November 27, 2009	3.05
The GAC investigates a Remington Arms factory that manufactured munitions for historic war efforts. An unsolved explosion killed seven workers and is suspected to be caused by sabotage by an enemy spy. The trio visited John Zaffis, who is referred to as the "godfather of the paranormal" and discussed phenomena related to residual hauntings.
6	6	"Old Washoe Club and Chollar Mine"	Virginia City, Nevada, US	December 4, 2009	3.06
After hearing EVPs calling out the names of both Nick and Zak recorded by other paranormal investigators after GAC's first investigation, the trio returns again to Virginia City, Nevada, to investigate the Old Washoe Club and Chollar Mine. Note: This episode is not available on Discovery+.
7	7	"Linda Vista Hospital"	Boyle Heights, Los Angeles, California, US	December 11, 2009	3.07
The crew searches for ghosts in Linda Vista Community Hospital located in east Los Angeles, California.
8	8	"Execution Rocks Lighthouse"	Port Washington, New York, US	December 18, 2009	3.08
The crew visits Execution Rocks Lighthouse, a deserted lighthouse with a history of murder, fires, and shipwrecks located in New York's Long Island Sound.
9	9	"Prospect Place"	Trinway, Ohio, US	January 1, 2010	3.09
The crew conduct a paranormal investigation at Prospect Place Mansion, located in Trinway, Ohio, which was used as a station on the Underground Railroad.
10	10	"Clovis Wolfe Manor"	Clovis, California, US	January 8, 2010	3.10
The GAC investigate the Wolfe Manor, also known as the Andleberry Estate, which was formerly part of a hospital whose wings were demolished. The building is described as a "black hole" because most of the former patients died there.

=== Season 4 (2010–11) ===
No. overall	No. in season	Title	Location(s)	Original release date	Prod. code
1	1	"Gettysburg"	Gettysburg, Pennsylvania, US	September 17, 2010	4.01
GAC investigates Gettysburg, Pennsylvania, at three different lock-down locations of the Gettysburg Battlefield. Part one takes place at the Soldiers National Museum, a former American Civil War-era orphanage where it is claimed that children were abused by a matron. Part two takes place at the Jennie Wade House, where Jennie Wade, the only civilian casualty in town, was killed in the kitchen by a stray bullet. Part three takes place at the Engine House, where the first battle of Gettysburg occurred.
2	2	"Rolling Hills Asylum"	Bethany, New York, US	September 24, 2010	4.02
The GAC gets locked down at the Rolling Hills Asylum in Bethany, New York. They search for ghosts with Darkness Radio host Dave Schrader from Paranormal State.
3	3	"Return to Bobby Mackey's"	Wilder, Kentucky, US	October 1, 2010	4.03
The GAC returns to Bobby Mackey's Music World in Wilder, Kentucky. The crew describes how their experiences in the paranormal world affect their lives.
4	4	"Waverly Hills Sanatorium"	Louisville, Kentucky, US	October 8, 2010	4.04
GAC investigates the Waverly Hills Sanatorium, a former tuberculosis hospital in the early 1900s that housed thousands of patients.
5	5	"Stanley Hotel"	Estes Park, Colorado, US	October 15, 2010	4.05
GAC travels to Estes Park, Colorado, to investigate the Stanley Hotel, the inspiration for the Stephen King novel and movie, The Shining.
6	6	"Hill View Manor"	New Castle, Pennsylvania, US	October 22, 2010	4.06
Zak, Nick, and Aaron head to New Castle, Pennsylvania, to investigate the Hill View Manor, built originally as a poor farm to house the mentally ill and homeless. The building was then converted into a nursing home in 1977 but today remains abandoned.
7	7	"Vulture Mine"	Wickenburg, Arizona, US	October 29, 2010	4.07
GAC travels to Wickenburg, Arizona, to investigate the Vulture Mine, the site of several mining accidents and deaths during the 19th century.
8	8	"USS Hornet"	Alameda, California, US	November 5, 2010	4.08
The Ghost Adventures crew gets locked down on the USS Hornet, which is claimed to be haunted by the spirits of sailors who died on the ship during World War II.
9	9	"La Palazza Mansion"	Las Vegas, Nevada, US	November 12, 2010	4.09
Zak, Nick, and Aaron head back to their hometown of Las Vegas to investigate the allegedly haunted La Palazza Mansion. Note: This episode is not available on Discovery+.
10	10	"Fort Chaffee"	Fort Smith, Arkansas, US	November 19, 2010	4.10
GAC investigates Fort Chaffee in Fort Smith, Arkansas. The fort was originally used during World War II as a military training ground for soldiers, then as a settlement during the Cold War and a Vietnamese refuge camp after the fall of South Vietnam. One half of the complex is a working army base while the other is an abandoned prison that was used for Cuban refugees in the 1980s.
11	11	"Amargosa Opera House"	Death Valley Junction, California, US	November 26, 2010	4.11
GAC investigates the Amargosa Opera House and Hotel in the middle of the desert of Death Valley Junction, California, allegedly a site of several suicides.
12	12	"Olde Fort Erie"	Fort Erie, Ontario, Canada	December 3, 2010	4.12
GAC heads across the northern border to investigate Olde Fort Erie located in Ontario, Canada, a fort that experienced a bloody battle during the War of 1812.
13	13	"Villisca Axe Murder House"	Villisca, Iowa, US	December 10, 2010	4.13
GAC heads to Villisca, Iowa, to investigate the Villisca Axe Murder House, home to the infamous Villisca Axe Murders of 1912, where an unknown axe murderer killed an entire family of six and two overnight guests while they slept. This was the first episode in the series to feature a "viewer discretion advised" warning.
14	14	"Kell's Irish Pub Restaurant"	Seattle, Washington, US	December 17, 2010	4.14
The crew heads to Seattle, Washington, to investigate Kell's Irish Pub Restaurant said to have been home to an undertaker that collected corpses.
15	15	"Pico House Hotel"	Los Angeles, California, US	January 7, 2011	4.15
The crew investigates the Pico House in Los Angeles, claimed to be connected with racial riots in 1871. Joining in the lockdown are Kane "Jason" Hodder, R.A. "Leatherface" Mihailoff and Rick "Stuntman" McCallum.
16	16	"Goldfield"	Goldfield, Nevada, US	January 14, 2011	4.16
The crew returns to Goldfield, Nevada, to investigate two locations, the Nixon Building and the Santa Fe Saloon, but receive the chance to reinvestigate the Goldfield Hotel once more, a site they first investigated six years earlier. Note: Zak and the crew did not have intentions to investigate the Goldfield Hotel, but the owner, Roberts, was there and they asked him if they could do another investigation. Note: This episode is not available on Discovery+.
17	17	"Bonnie Spring Ranch"	Blue Diamond, Nevada, US	January 21, 2011	4.17
Built in 1843 as a stopover for the wagon trains going to California, Bonnie Springs Ranch has been transformed into a tourist attraction.
18	18	"Valentine's Day Special"	Sudbury, Massachusetts, US	February 11, 2011	4.18
Zak, Nick, and Aaron travel to Sudbury, Massachusetts, and check into Longfellow's Wayside Inn where the ghost of Jerusha Howe is claimed to still reside.
19	19	"Salem Witch House / Lyceum Restaurant"	Salem, Massachusetts, US	February 18, 2011	4.19
Zak, Nick, and Aaron travel to Salem to perform a ritual in hopes of contacting souls involved in the witch trials. They get locked down inside The Witch House, former home of judge Jonathan Corwin, the only building still standing with direct ties to the Salem Witch Trials. The crew also investigates the Lyceum Restaurant, built on the former site of an apple orchard owned by Bridget Bishop, the first person executed for witchcraft during the trials.
20	20	"Jerome Grand Hotel"	Jerome, Arizona, US	February 25, 2011	4.20
The Jerome Grand Hotel is the most haunted structure in a town known as "Ghost City".
21	21	"Yorktown Hospital"	Yorktown, Texas, US	March 18, 2011	4.21
GAC heads to Yorktown, Texas, to investigate the town's old hospital, where it is claimed that as many as 2,000 people died.
22	22	"Madame Tussauds Wax Museum"	Las Vegas, Nevada, US	April 8, 2011	4.22
Zak returns to his hometown of Las Vegas to investigate stories of ghosts walking the corridors of Madame Tussauds Wax Museum.
23	23	"Sacramento Tunnels"	Sacramento, California, US	April 15, 2011	4.23
GAC investigates the Sacramento Tunnels (Old Sacramento Underground), as well as other reportedly haunted locations in Old Sacramento State Historic Park in Sacramento, California, such as the old Eagle Theatre, and the original California Supreme Court.
24	24	"Hales Bar Marina and Dam"	Haletown, Tennessee, US	April 29, 2011	4.24
Zak, Nick, and Aaron travel to Guild, Tennessee to investigate the Hales Bar Marina on Lake Nickajack, as well as the former Hales Bar Dam, a hydroelectric dam on the Tennessee River which now serves as the resort's dry dock.
25	25	"Kentucky Slave House"	Maysville, Kentucky, US	May 13, 2011	4.25
Zak, Nick, and Aaron investigate the Maysville Slave House.
26	26	"Tooele Hospital"	Tooele, Utah, US	May 27, 2011	4.26
Stories of spirits at Tooele Hospital, bring Zak, Nick, and Aaron to investigate this hospital turned haunted house named "Asylum 49".
27	27	"Loretta Lynn's Plantation House"	Hurricane Mills, Tennessee, US	June 10, 2011	4.27
Zak, Nick, and Aaron investigate their first celebrity home when they visit the Loretta Lynn Plantation House in Hurricane Mills, Tennessee. They split up and divide their investigation between locations throughout the plantation.

=== Season 5 (2011) ===
No. overall	No. in season	Title	Location(s)	Original release date	Prod. code
54	1	"Ashmore Estates"	Ashmore, Illinois, US	September 23, 2011	5.01
The Ghost Adventures crew travels to Ashmore, Illinois, to investigate the Ashmore Estates, a former almshouse built in 1916 and then converted into a private psychiatric facility in 1959. The care facility was permanently closed in 1987 and remained abandoned until 111 when it reopened as a commercially operated haunted house.
55	2	"Mizpah Hotel"	Tonopah, Nevada, US	September 30, 2011	5.02
Zak, Nick, and Aaron return to Tonopah, Nevada, to investigate the historic Mizpah Hotel. Built in 1907, the hotel closed its doors in 1999 but reopened in 2011, the GAC wanting to investigate the location since 2004. The crew also returns to the Castle House, the site of their very first paranormal investigation.
56	3	"Old Town San Diego"	San Diego, California, US	October 7, 2011	5.03
The team travels to San Diego, California's Old Town San Diego to conduct a multi-part lockdown in the Casa de Estudillo and the Cosmopolitan Hotel & Restaurant.
57	4	"Winchester Mystery House"	San Jose, California, US	October 14, 2011	5.04
GAC travels to San Jose, California, to get locked-down inside the legendary Winchester Mystery House, a 160-room Victorian mansion filled with mazes of hallways, staircases leading to nowhere, and trap doors. Beginning in 1884, the house was built continuously for over 38 years, by Sarah Winchester, an eccentric heiress to the Winchester rifle company who was told by a fortune teller that the spirits of those killed by the rifles would kill her as soon as the house was finished being built. Note: This lockdown was never completed because at 1:00am Zak Bagans felt very strange and found out that at that exact time, his grandmother had died in her home in Detroit, Michigan. Note: This episode is not available on Discovery+.
58	5	"Lizzie Borden House"	Fall River, Massachusetts, US	October 21, 2011	5.05
GAC visits the old mill town of Fall River to get locked-down in the Lizzie Borden House, now a bed and breakfast, which was the scene to one of the most infamous murders in American history. A murder-suicide committed by one of Borden's relatives in 1848 is also mentioned.
59	6	"Letchworth Village"	Haverstraw, New York, US	October 28, 2011	5.06
GAC heads to the abandoned Letchworth Village in Rockland County, a former residential community for the disabled and mentally ill which was closed after the media discovered that patients were tortured and some of the staff were mistreated.
60	7	"Return to Virginia City"	Virginia City, Nevada, US	November 11, 2011	5.07
Zak, Nick, and Aaron return to the Virginia City, Nevada, the city where they captured some of their most compelling paranormal evidence to date. They get locked down in three locations: St. Mary's Art Center, the Silver Queen Hotel, and the Miner's Cabin at the Yellow Jacket Mine.
61	8	"Rocky Point Manor"	Harrodsburg, Kentucky, US; Perryville, Kentucky, US	December 2, 2011	5.08
Zak, Nick, and Aaron embark on a journey to Harrodsburg, Kentucky, in a two-part lockdown where the guys will investigate the troubled Rocky Point Manor as well as the Perryville Battlefield, the site of one of the American Civil War's bloodiest battles.
62	9	"Rose Hall"	Montego Bay, St. James Parish, Jamaica	December 9, 2011	5.09
GAC travels to Montego Bay for their international investigation of the Great House of Rose Hall Plantation, home to the evil spirit of Annie Palmer, the White Witch of Rose Hall. Also, the crew investigates their second celebrity home, Cinnamon Hill Plantation House, the former home of Johnny Cash that sits on the same property.
63	10	"Old Charleston Jail"	Charleston, South Carolina, US	December 16, 2011	5.10
The crew gets locked down in the Old Charleston Jail in Charleston, South Carolina, which held some of the city's most notorious criminals like Lavinia Fisher, the first female serial killer. GAC also demonstrates a daytime-investigation when they find evidence at The Battery Carriage House Inn. Note: This season finale episode is the location in which the Ghost Adventures Mashup Video Contest winner gets to join GAC in their lockdown.

=== Season 6 (2012) ===
No. overall	No. in season	Title	Location(s)	Original release date	Prod. code
64	1	"Shanghai Tunnels"	Portland, Oregon, US	March 9, 2012	6.01
The Ghost Adventures Crew investigates the Shanghai Tunnels underneath modern-day Portland, Oregon, which were reportedly used to kidnap or "shanghai" unsuspecting victims, sell them as slaves to sea captains waiting at the waterfront and force them to work aboard their ships. Note: This episode marks the first time the crew did a full investigation from dawn until dusk instead of dusk until dawn.
65	2	"Peabody-Whitehead Mansion"	Denver, Colorado, US	March 16, 2012	6.02
UFC fighter Brendan Schaub joins GAC as a guest investigator on a special lockdown of the haunted Peabody-Whitehead Mansion in Denver, Colorado, to investigate an unsolved murder that happened in the historic home many years ago. They also investigated the student union, formerly a brewery, at the University of Colorado at Denver. Note: The evidence from the basement portion of the lock down was taken to the police, and Zak reveals that an investigation opened.
66	3	"The Copper Queen Hotel & The Oliver House"	Bisbee, Arizona, US	March 23, 2012	6.03
The Ghost Adventures Crew visits Bisbee, Arizona, to search for spirits at both the Oliver House Bed & Breakfast and the Copper Queen Hotel as part of a two-part lockdown.
67	4	"The National Hotel"	Nevada City, California, US	March 30, 2012	6.04
The crew heads to Nevada City, California, to investigate both the National Exchange Hotel and the tunnels underneath the nearby Stonehouse Brewery where several Chinese laborers perished.
68	5	"Return to Linda Vista Hospital"	Los Angeles, California, US	April 6, 2012	6.05
GAC returns to the Linda Vista Hospital in East Los Angeles, where Nick once had a profound psychic connection with the ghost of a former patient, a young woman in a bloody hospital gown. They set out to find her again along with actor and Ghost Adventures fan Chad Lindberg and their new experimental electrical pod. Note: This episode is not available on Discovery+.
69	6	"The Galka Family"	Granby, Connecticut, US	April 20, 2012	6.06
Zak, Nick, and Aaron help Gary Galka, the man who designs and builds GAC's paranormal equipment, and his family find closure 7 years after the tragic loss of their young daughter, Melissa who was killed in a car accident when her car ran into a tree while driving home from a party in the middle of the night on a local road (Silver Street) in Granby, Connecticut. They communicate with her on what was supposed to be her 25th birthday on Valentine's Day.
70	7	"The Riviera Hotel"	Las Vegas, Nevada, US	April 27, 2012	6.07
The guys are joined by Mötley Crüe vocalist Vince Neil and pro poker player Jamie Gold in Las Vegas where they try to evoke the spirit of Frank Sinatra while exploring his old penthouse suite at the Riviera Hotel & Casino.
SP1	SP1	"Hellfire Caves"	West Wycombe, High Wycombe, United Kingdom	July 13, 2012	6.08
Zak, Nick & Aaron explore the Hellfire Caves outside London, England, where they recreate past secret pagan rituals and conjure the spirits of 18th century English royalty.
SP2	SP2	"Fort Horsted"	Chatham, Kent, United Kingdom	July 20, 2012	6.09
The crew are in Kent, England, inside Fort Horsted; the guys recruit locals to conduct a séance to provoke the demonic spirits that terrify visitors at the fort.

=== Season 7 (2012–13) ===
No. overall	No. in season	Title	Location(s)	Original release date	Prod. code
71	1	"Central Unit Prison"	Sugar Land, Texas, US; Huntsville, Texas, US	September 14, 2012	7.01
Zak, Nick, and Aaron investigate the Central Unit Prison in Sugarland, Texas, where over 100 inmates were executed via electric chair; the GAC investigation is to be the first and only granted by the Texas Department of Criminal Justice before the prison's planned demolition later in 2012. The crew also visits the Texas Prison Museum in Huntsville, Texas, to gather important information regarding Central Unit Prison.
72	2	"Excalibur Nightclub"	Chicago, Illinois, US	September 21, 2012	7.02
Zak returns with Nick and Aaron to his hometown of Glen Ellyn, Illinois, to reminisce about his past before their lockdown at the Excalibur Nightclub in Chicago, Illinois, where 300 people perished in the Great Chicago Fire. They also pay a visit to one of the most haunted burial grounds in the world, Bachelor's Grove Cemetery, located 45 minutes outside of Chicago.
73	3	"Point Sur Lighthouse"	Big Sur, California, US	September 28, 2012	7.03
The guys search for ghosts of deceased passengers (especially of the Los Angeles) that died in numerous shipwrecks that crashed on the rocky shore by the Point Sur Lighthouse at Point Sur on the north end of California's Big Sur coastline.
74	4	"The Palmer House"	Sauk Centre, Minnesota, US	October 5, 2012	7.04
The Ghost Adventures Crew conduct their first investigation in Minnesota at The Palmer House in Sauk Centre that burned down to the ground when it was known as Sauk Centre House, killing several people. They probe for demonic paranormal activity with fellow investigator and Darkness on The Edge of Town radio host Dave Schrader who experienced a dark entity that came out from under the stairs down in the basement.
75	5	"Black Moon Manor"	Greenfield, Indiana, US	October 12, 2012	7.05
GAC travel to Greenfield, Indiana, the rural part of the Indianapolis metropolitan area to investigate claims of demonic hauntings and the dark energies that has overrun the former Eastes family farm which is now used as a haunted attraction called Black Moon Manor.
76	6	"Sedamsville Rectory"	Cincinnati, Ohio, US	October 19, 2012	7.06
The guys uncover reports of child abuse and illegal dogfighting during their investigation of the Sedamsville Rectory in Sedamsville, Cincinnati. After learning about all the demonic attacks the owners suffered, the guys decide to contact a Catholic priest to perform an exorcism of the rectory. They also stop by Bobby Mackey's Music World to pay their respects to the club's former caretaker, Carl Lawson.
77	7	"Cripple Creek"	Cripple Creek, Colorado, US; Florissant, Colorado, US	October 26, 2012	7.07
Zak, Nick, and Aaron travel to the historic mining town of Cripple Creek, Colorado, to investigate three diverse locations plagued with intense paranormal activity: the Colorado Grande Casino & Hotel, the Outlaws & Lawmen Jail Museum, and the Piotrowski House, a private residence near Florissant, Colorado, that sits on an old Native American battlefield where a bloody battle was fought between the Ute and Comanche peoples. Note: Nick did not investigate in this episode due to a close family friend dying the day before the lockdown.
78	8	"Brookdale Lodge"	Brookdale, California, US	November 9, 2012	7.08
The GAC visit the historic Brookdale Lodge located in Brookdale, California, where the running water of Clearwater Creek flows through the world-famous "Brook Room". The guys use Zak's pet dog Gracie in an attempt to contact the spirit of a deceased little girl named Sarah Logan who drowned in the brook around 1918. Note: Nick's grandfather died days before the filming of this episode. Nick and his family attended the funeral the day of the investigation although he was still able to participate in the lockdown.
79	9	"Tor House"	Carmel, California, US	November 16, 2012	7.09
The crew travel to the Pacific coastal town of Carmel-by-the-Sea, California, to visit the Tor House, the former home of American poet, Robinson Jeffers, who predicted he would talk to the living 50 years after his death. The guys watch in awe as they glimpse a misty figure by the tower.
80	10	"Union Station"	Kansas City, Missouri, US	November 23, 2012	7.10
The guys investigates the old Union Station in downtown Kansas City, Missouri, in order to contact the spirits that were killed in the Kansas City Massacre. The GAC also catch a glimpse of an apparition on the thermal camera that does not show a heat reflection on the floor where it appeared.
81	11	"Crazy Town"	Mineral Wells, Texas, US	December 7, 2012	7.11
Zak, Nick, and Aaron travel to the town of Mineral Wells, Texas, to determine if the town's mineral water the locals call "crazy water" has caused the Baker Hotel to become infested with ghosts. During the lockdown, Zak turns aggressive after a shadow figure seems to disappear into him. Note: Zak finds a homeless puppy in front of the hotel during setup which is adopted by GAC's audio/visual tech, Billy Tolley.
82	12	"Wyoming Frontier Prison"	Rawlins, Wyoming, US	January 11, 2013	7.12
GAC gets locked down at the Wyoming Frontier Prison in Rawlins, Wyoming, where 200 tortured souls still remain incarcerated for their crimes they committed in life and are now serving in death for all eternity. They also investigate the Dean/Summer Home a few blocks away, after hearing the story of the "Garage Witch" that left a woman paralyzed in the house's garage in the 1970s.
83	13	"Sailor's Snug Harbor"	Staten Island, New York, US	January 18, 2013	7.13
Zak, Nick, and Aaron are accompanied by a crew from ABC News Nightline for their lockdown at Sailors' Snug Harbor in the New York City borough of Staten Island. During their investigation, they experience phantom noises and a shadow lurking in the darkness.
84	14	"New Orleans"	New Orleans, Louisiana, US	February 22, 2013	7.14
Zak, Nick and Aaron set off to New Orleans to search for more ghosts in three locations. While Nick and Aaron are sent to investigate Bloody Mary's house, Zak is investigating May Baily's Place, a former bordello which is supposedly haunted by prostitutes and the soul of a person killed by Hurricane Katrina in 2005. Finally the three head off to the haunted mortuary where the apparition of a little girl has been snapped by a photographer.
85	15	"Market Street Cinema"	San Francisco, California, US	March 1, 2013	7.15
The team investigate claims of paranormal encounters at the Market Street Cinema strip club in San Francisco, California. During the day's walk-through, Zak is blindsided by an evil entity. Note: This episode is not available on Discovery+.
86	16	"Goldfield Hotel: Redemption"	Goldfield, Nevada, US	March 22, 2013	7.16
The GAC return for a 48-hour investigation of the legendary Goldfield Hotel in Nevada, where they captured some of their best evidence to date.
87	17	"Glen Tavern Inn"	Santa Paula, California, US	March 29, 2013	7.17
The guys explore the Glen Tavern Inn in Santa Paula, California, where they are joined for a lockdown by actress Brit Morgan and singer Mimi Page. During the investigation they hold a séance and read tarot cards.
88	18	"Kings Tavern"	Natchez, Mississippi, US	April 19, 2013	7.18
The GAC heads to Natchez, Mississippi, to investigate the claims of hauntings at the King's Tavern, one of the oldest buildings in the state.

=== Season 8 (2013) ===
No. overall	No. in season	Title	Location(s)	Original release date	Prod. code
89	1	"Pioneer Saloon"	Goodsprings, Nevada, US; Sandy Valley, Nevada, US	August 16, 2013	8.01
The Ghost Adventures Crew travel deep into the Nevada desert to the old ghost town of Goodsprings to investigate the Pioneer Saloon, where they attempt to solve the mystery of the plane crash that killed movie star Carole Lombard while also investigating the claims of brutal murders of Paul Coski and other cowboys who cheated at cards during poker games. The lockdown is split into two, as Zak and Aaron investigate the saloon and Nick and Billy investigate the nearby abandoned Belle Mine, where many miners were killed when it collapsed.
90	2	"Black Swan Inn"	San Antonio, Texas, US	August 23, 2013	8.02
GAC head to the severely haunted Black Swan Inn located in San Antonio, Texas. The Inn was built upon the land of the Battle of Salado Creek, and is considered sacred land by Native Americans. They also learn of a demonic attack that threatened the life of a local paranormal investigator.
91	3	"Tuolumne General Hospital"	Sonora, California, US	August 30, 2013	8.03
Zak, Nick and Aaron travel to Sonora, California, to investigate the extremely active and recently abandoned Tuolumne General Hospital. The hospital was a key part of Sonora in 1847 as there was a gold rush in the local mines. The hospital was a vital item of the small town because it was needed to heal the injured miners. Healing was the last thing that this hospital did, however, neglect and rejection was all that was done to the innocent miners who were left to die here.
92	4	"Missouri State Penitentiary"	Jefferson City, Missouri, US	September 6, 2013	8.04
GAC travels to Jefferson City, Missouri, to investigate the Missouri State Penitentiary, a prison which has seen suicides, riots, murders and brutal attacks which now are all kept as residual energy within the walls of the old penitentiary. They get locked down in what Time magazine proclaims as "the bloodiest forty-seven acres of America" and to find out more about the multiple dark entities haunting the cellblocks and gas chamber.
93	5	"Yost Theater & Ritz Hotel"	Santa Ana, California, US	September 13, 2013	8.05
Zak, Nick and Aaron engage in a multi-part lockdown in Santa Ana, CA. First they investigate the Yost Theater, a venue from the early 1900s which invites some of the world's best electronic DJ's also houses several spirits. But conflict arises at their second lockdown when they find the Ritz Hotel under construction. So they add the Santa Ana Historical Society located inside the Willella Howe-Waffle House (one the country's first female physicians) which served as an abortion clinic to the night's lockdown.
94	6	"Haunted Victorian Mansion"	Gardner, Massachusetts, US	September 20, 2013	8.06
Nick is in his hometown of Boston where he and his fellow investigators, Zak and Aaron visit the location where just this year several people died and hundreds were injured as two bombs exploded during the Boston Marathon. Then it's off to their lockdown an hour outside the city to Pierce Victorian Mansion, a century-old haunted home. Lillian Otero and Edwin Gonzalez bought the house in 2009 and claim it to be their "dream house", but that was before they moved in. It turned into a "hell house" as paranormal events forced them to leave, leaving GAC to communicate with the spirits to understand why they're haunting the house.
95	7	"The Exorcist House"	Bel-Nor, Missouri, US	October 4, 2013	8.07
Zak, Nick and Aaron celebrate Ghost Adventure's 100th episode and investigation by heading to what the locals call the "Exorcist House" in the St. Louis area. They get locked down inside the house and search for the real life demon(s) that possessed a 13-year-old boy on March 16, 1949 and also inspired the film The Exorcist.
96	8	"Alcatraz"	San Francisco, California, US	October 11, 2013	8.08
GAC get locked down in one of the most historic and notoriously haunted prisons in the world, the infamous Alcatraz, the "Evil Island". While in cellblock D, they step inside the solitary confinement Cell 13 which many have seen glowing red eyes responsible for killing an inmate and examine the 1962 escape attempt. They also travel by boat in the freezing cold waters of San Francisco Bay they learn that over 1,600 people have jumped to their death from the iconic Golden Gate Bridge which they believe has a connection to the island.
97	9	"Mustang Ranch"	Clark, Nevada, US	October 18, 2013	8.09
The guys visit the infamous Mustang Ranch, a legal brothel near Reno, Nevada, to investigate claims of an angry male spirit sexually attacking the female employees. This entity is believed to be professional boxer Oscar Bonavena who was shot down and killed right in front of the security gates by a bodyguard in 1976 after the ranch's owner Joe Conforte found out he was having an affair with his ex-wife Sally. Also EVP specialists Mark and Debbie Constantino are brought in to gather audio evidence during the lockdown. Note: This episode is not available on Discovery+.
98	10	"Thornhaven Manor"	New Castle, Indiana, US	October 25, 2013	8.10
The Ghost Adventures Crew head to rural New Castle, Indiana, to get locked down in a haunted manor house out in the middle of nowhere built in 1845 that has made the new owner uneasy with the screams he has been hearing frequently. They discover there was a murder in the home when the caretaker was poisoned by his son-in-law when he put rat poison in his morning coffee in 1906.
99	11	"Battle of Perryville: Field Hospitals"	Perryville, Kentucky, US	November 15, 2013	8.11
The guys return to the Perryville Battlefield Historic Site they once visited in Season 5 to officially investigate the lands that saw more than 7,600 casualties in the Battle of Perryville, one of the bloodiest battles of the Civil War. They also explore two locations that are allegedly haunted by the ghosts of soldiers: the John Dye House which served as a military field hospital and the privately owned H.P. Bottom House which is the only house that still stands that was between the battle lines causing it to have over 150-year-old bullet holes and blood stains.

=== Season 9 (2014) ===
No. overall	No. in season	Title	Location(s)	Original release date	Prod. code	U.S. viewers (millions)
100	1	"Sharon Tate Ghost / The Oman House"	Los Angeles, California, US	February 15, 2014	9.1	1.28
In the season opener, Zak, Nick, and Aaron head to Los Angeles for their lockdown at the Oman House, a mansion located on the infamous address of 10050 Cielo Drive in Benedict Canyon. The home is said to be riddled with paranormal activity believed to be directly linked to the Manson Murders of 1969 that killed Hollywood actress Sharon Tate. The guys also discover that the house was built upon Native American burial grounds.
101	2	"The Myrtles Plantation"	St. Francisville, Louisiana, US	February 22, 2014	9.2	0.95
GAC head to the bayou in search of the famously captured on camera slave and children spirits that reside at the Myrtles Plantation, one of hundreds of plantation houses in Louisiana dating back to the state's slavery years. It is also believed that there have been ten murders on the property which is renowned to be one of the most likely places to see an apparition in the world, including those of voodoo priestess Miss Cleo and slave servant Chloe.
102	3	"George Washington Ghost / Morris Jumel Mansion"	Manhattan, New York, US; Smithtown, New York, US	March 1, 2014	9.3	0.84
GAC go in search of the ghosts at the Morris-Jumel Mansion which include George Washington, a soldier and the spirit of an angry lady believed to be Madame Eliza Jumel. The house is said to be full of anomalous orbs that are often captured on cameras. During their lockdown, an eerie creature is captured on their Kinect camera that is seen climbing up audio/visual tech Billy Tolley. Later, Zak and Aaron head to Smithtown on Long Island to visit Katie's Bar (formerly the Smithtown Hotel that burned down in 1909) where glasses have been recorded by security cameras mysteriously flying off shelves.
103	4	"Bannack Ghost Town"	Dillon, Montana, US	March 8, 2014	9.4	0.91
GAC travel to Montana to investigate Hotel Meade, the former site of the county courthouse of Beaverhead County that resides in the former gold mining mecca turned ghost town of Bannack, now a state park. During their lockdown, the guys expand the scope of their investigation to include more buildings; the "crying-baby house" (believed to be used as a quarantine hospital to lock children with scarlet fever away), the old Methodist church, the saloon, the schoolhouse, and also the dedge pond where a teenage girl drowned in 1916.
104	5	"Fear Factory"	Salt Lake City, Utah, US	March 15, 2014	9.5	0.97
Zak, Nick and Aaron head to a 100-year-old cement factory that's been turned into a Halloween attraction. The guys are shocked to hear that employees recite from a satanic bible, causing all sorts of aggressive and demonic paranormal activity. The location is even more eerie in the fact that it holds the address number "666".
105	6	"Heritage Junction"	Santa Clarita, California, US	March 22, 2014	9.6	0.90
Zak, Nick and Aaron travel back in time to the Heritage Junction, home to eight historic buildings to investigate the unsolved murder of Mrs. Margaret Rutledge. During the lockdown, husband and wife duo, Michael and Marti Perry make their debut investigation with the guys as psychics who make contact with a deceased man as well as Nick's grandparents. Note: Before the lockdown, the guys make a short stop to the spot where actor Paul Walker died to pay their respects to the late actor.
106	7	"Fort MacArthur Museum / Battle of Los Angeles"	Los Angeles, California, US	March 29, 2014	9.7	0.74
GAC head to San Pedro for their lockdown inside the Fort MacArthur Military Museum, the site of many claims of paranormal activity believed to be caused by UFOs Built in 1914, this coastal defense battery was put to the test after Pearl Harbor when they fired almost 1,500 rounds of ammunition at what they believed was an air invasion. The guys also learn about the history of the Battle of Los Angeles.
107	8	"St. James Hotel"	Cimarron, New Mexico, US	April 12, 2014	9.8	0.85
Zak, Nick and Aaron visit the historic St. James Hotel outside Raton, New Mexico, where many famous people from the Old West, including Jesse James, Wyatt Earp and Annie Oakley, have stayed over the years. During their lockdown, the guys investigate reports of an ill-tempered spirit in Room 18, which is padlocked shut and off-limits to guests.
108	9	"Fox Hollow Farm"	Carmel, Indiana, US	May 3, 2014	9.9	0.90
GAC travel to rural Indiana for their lockdown at Fox Hollow Farm, a beautiful mansion on a farm where serial killer Herb Baumeister targeted gay men, luring them back to his pool room and killing up to 19 men by erotic asphyxiation in the mid-1990s. Although eleven of these deaths were identified on the premises, eight still remain a mystery. The guys also venture into the back woods where hundreds of the bones of his victims were found by investigators in June 1996.
109	10	"Haunted Savannah"	Savannah, Georgia, US	May 17, 2014	9.10	0.75
GAC return to historic Savannah for their lockdown at the haunted Sorrel Weed House, the famous antebellum-style home considered the most haunted house in town. Built by Francis Sorrel in 1838 for his wife Matilda who later committed suicide by jumping off the balcony after finding him having an affair with their slave Molly. They also investigate the Gribble House, the site of the 1909 Savannah Axe Murders. The home was demolished in the 1940s and is now home of The Old Town Trolley, a massive werehouse that also was built on former slave quarters from the 1800s.
110	11	"Whaley House"	San Diego, California, US	June 7, 2014	9.11	0.54
GAC head back to the west coast for their lockdown at the infamous Whaley House of Old Town, San Diego, one of the most haunted houses in America due to its numerous spirits haunting the home, including Violet Whaley who committed suicide through gunshot wound in the outhouse and the ghost of "Yankee Jim", a thief who was hanged on the gallows in 1852; the same spot where settler Thomas Whaley built his home four years later.
111	12	"Overland Hotel and Saloon"	Pioche, Nevada, US	June 21, 2014	9.12	0.77
Zak, Nick and Aaron are back in their home state of Nevada when they visit Pioche, an 1860s silver-mining town that is one of the most violent Wild West towns in America. During their lockdown, they investigate the historic Overland Hotel and Saloon, and the Lincoln County Courthouse and Jail which earned the nickname "Million Dollar Courthouse" after it cost $75,000 to build in 1872, which is amounted to $1.48 million in today's money. An anomaly possesses and disorients Nick, and a sudden force knocks Zak off his feet.
112	13	"Old Licking County Jail"	Newark, Ohio, US	July 12, 2014	9.13	0.84
GAC travel to Ohio for their lockdown at the Old Licking County Jail, where multiple murders of famous criminals, inmate suicides and the deaths of four sheriffs were the norm. Also during their trip, they investigate a local paranormal investigator's nearby house who said she captured a photo of a dark shadow apparition named "Davey" who became attached to her back at the jail and then followed her home.

=== Season 10 (2014–15) ===
No. overall	No. in season	Title	Location(s)	Original release date	Prod. code	U.S. viewers (millions)
113	1	"Queen Mary"	Long Beach, California, US	October 4, 2014	10.1	0.99
In the season ten premiere, Zak, Nick and Aaron board the iconic RMS Queen Mary docked in Long Beach, California, for their lockdown. Once the most luxurious ship at sea, the Queen Mary is now considered one of the most haunted places on earth. Towards the end of the investigation, Zak captures a fully defined shadow figure on his night vision enabled camcorder cross a doorway, which they were not able to debunk as a trespasser. Note: This episode is not available on Discovery+.
114	2	"Lemp Mansion"	St. Louis, Missouri, US	October 11, 2014	10.2	0.71
GAC travels to St. Louis, Missouri, to investigate the Lemp Mansion and Brewery, along with the Cherokee Cave system that once stored the Lemp's lager. After years of tragedy and suicide, this mansion, which is an American landmark, is now known by Life magazine as "one of the ten most haunted places in America".
115	3	"Zozo Demon"	Oklahoma City, Oklahoma, US	October 18, 2014	10.3	0.81
Zak, Nick and Aaron head to Oklahoma City, Oklahoma, to investigate a home terrorized by an ancient, demonic force called "Zozo", an ancient demon which is known for attacking, sexually assaulting and possessing its victims through a spirit board. Note: This is the final episode with GAC co-founder Nick Groff.
116	4	"Island of Dolls"	Xochimilco, Mexico City, Mexico	October 25, 2014	10.4	0.90
While Nick celebrates the birth of his daughter, Zak and Aaron travel to Xochimilco, Mexico, where the dark and creepy canals are home to what might be the world's strangest and scariest tourist attraction; the "Island of the Dolls", because of the many baby dolls in the trees. Zak must get over his fear of dolls on an island that is also the site of a sinister and haunted mystery of a little girl who drowned there in 1950.
117	5	"Bell Witch Cave"	Adams, Tennessee, US	January 10, 2015	10.5	0.80
Zak, Aaron, Bill and Jay travel to the Bell Witch Cave in a secluded area near Cross Plains, Tennessee, where they will investigate the notorious legend of the Bell Witch that has plagued the Bell family and other families on the nearby farmland in 1817. This is the first time in Paranormal TV that the case is documented. Note: This episode is not available on Discovery+. Note: This is the first episode without former GAC member Nick Groff (he left the show to pursue other paranormal interests).
118	6	"Sallie House"	Atchison, Kansas, US	January 17, 2015	10.6	0.84
Zak, Aaron, Bill and Jay travel to the Sallie House, claimed to be one of the most haunted houses in the Midwest, to investigate the claims of demonic attacks after the experiences of the Pickman family in 1992.
119	7	"Nopeming Sanatorium"	Duluth, Minnesota, US	January 24, 2015	10.7	1.08
The Ghost Adventures crew travels to Duluth, Minnesota, where they become the first paranormal team to investigate the Nopeming Sanatorium, where thousands of people died from tuberculosis.
120	8	"Apache Junction"	Apache Junction, Arizona, US	January 31, 2015	10.08	0.85
The Ghost Adventures Crew spend the night in the ghost town of Goldfield, Arizona, which was the original Apache Junction. Zak tests new gas-detecting equipment in the mines, and Jay Wasley is utterly startled when he sees a man in a trench coat roaming through the town. The team also ventures into the cursed lands of the Superstition Mountain in order to find out any details related to the hectic mining for the Lost Dutchman's Gold Mine and its connections to Apache Junction
121	9	"Return to Tombstone"	Tombstone, Arizona, US	February 21, 2015	10.09	0.93
The Ghost Adventures Crew returns to where the Old West never died, Tombstone, Arizona, to investigate Big Nose Kate's Saloon, a place tormented by a spirit known only as the Swamper. But the guys also stop by and reinvestigate the Bird Cage Theatre which they investigated five years earlier and pay their respects to Leroy Colomy, a close friend who was tragically shot and killed only a short distance from the doorsteps of the theatre.
122	10	"Demons in Seattle"	Bothell, Washington	February 28, 2015	10.10	0.96
The Ghost Adventures Crew, along with Darkness Radio host Dave Schrader and Bill Chappell, travels to a quiet suburb just outside Seattle to investigate the residence of a local Bothell man who claims that a demonic entity is wreaking havoc in his home by burning bibles, throwing furniture, and burning demonic symbols in his walls.
123	11	"Texas Horror Hotel"	Seguin, Texas, US; San Antonio, Texas, US	March 7, 2015	10.11	0.91
GAC investigate the Magnolia Hotel in Seguin, Texas, which is plagued with the dark history of murder and suicide. The guys try a new magnetic microphone device, and see a handprint mysteriously appear. Also, they head to San Antonio to test a local legend at the Missions Park train tracks, where a school bus of little children was all instantly killed when a speeding train collided with it.

=== Season 11 (2015) ===
No. overall	No. in season	Title	Location(s)	Original release date	Prod. code	U.S. viewers (millions)
124	1	"Edinburgh Manor"	Scotch Grove, Iowa, US	August 22, 2015	11.1	0.64
In the Season 11 premiere, Zak, Aaron, Billy and Jay travel to the outskirts of Anamosa, Iowa, for their lockdown at the extremely haunted Edinburgh Manor. Built in 1850, the manor housed the incurably insane and has had over 100 documented deaths within its walls. They investigate to find evidence of attacks from the entity known as "The Joker"
125	2	"Old Montana State Prison"	Deer Lodge, Montana, US	August 29, 2015	11.2	0.62
The Ghost Adventures Crew visits the Old Montana State Prison in Deer Lodge, a place haunted today by an elderly inmate named "Turkey Pete" Eitner who died here, and also by the inmates who planned the deadly 1959 prison riot where the deputy warden was shot and killed. During the lockdown, the guys witness camera batteries inexplicably explode and fizzle acid.
126	3	"Manresa Castle"	Port Townsend, Washington, US	September 5, 2015	11.3	0.83
GAC sets sail to Port Townsend, Washington, for their lockdown at Manresa Castle. The guys investigate the claims of violent hauntings and the suicide of a monk who hanged himself in the tower when the castle was a Jesuit monastery. They also look into the mystery of original owner Charles Eisenbeis' being buried with an unknown child in his family plot when he died in 1902. During the lockdown, an entity mimics and torments Aaron.
127	4	"Old Lincoln County Hospital"	Fayetteville, Tennessee, US	September 12, 2015	11.4	0.72
The Ghost Adventures Crew travels to Fayetteville, Tennessee, for their lockdown at the Old Lincoln County Hospital, a claimed powerhouse of paranormal activity. They investigate to validate claims of a little girl who attaches herself to someone she likes and an entity known as the "Angel of Death", who harassed patients before they died.
128	5	"Haunted Harvey House"	Las Vegas, New Mexico, US	September 19, 2015	11.5	0.77
GAC travels to Las Vegas, New Mexico, to be the first team to officially investigate the abandoned Castaneda Hotel, one of the Fred Harvey Company's most famous "Harvey House" hotels. They also investigate the nearby haunted Plaza Hotel, where the spirit of original owner Byron T. Mills is said to target and attack women in his office, room 310.
129	6	"Los Coches Adobe"	Soledad, California, US; Salinas, California, US	September 26, 2015	11.6	0.86
GAC travels to Soledad, California, for their lockdown at the Los Coches Adobe, a former brothel where a lady in black is said to roam. During the investigation, a shadow figure appears in front of Jay and sends him in a panic. The guys also investigate a local legend about Old Stage Road outside of Salinas, California, to validate peoples claims of a female spirit appearing on the road, and in their car.
130	7	"Grand Canyon Caverns"	Peach Springs, Arizona, US	October 3, 2015	11.7	0.83
The Ghost Adventures Crew travels to the remote desert outside of Peach Springs, Arizona, for their lockdown at the Grand Canyon Caverns, and a sacred Indian burial site near Oatman, Arizona. The guys experience rocks being thrown at them, and Zak has an eerie one on one encounter with an entity.
131	8	"Haunted Hollywood"	Los Angeles, California, US	October 10, 2015	11.8	0.72
The GAC split up and investigate three hauntings around Hollywood, California. Zak and Jay investigate the local American Legion Post 43, where it is believed to be haunted by a bartender who died after falling backwards down a staircase, and is also home to some celebrity spirits, including Charlie Chaplin, and Harry Lucenay. Billy and Aaron investigate the Hollywood Sign to find the spirit of Peg Entwistle after her suicide from jumping off the "H", and also investigate two areas in Griffith Park, the old merry-go-round, where the ghost of a boy is seen, and the old Griffith Park Zoo, where a female spirit is seen.
132	9	"Odd Fellows Asylum"	Liberty, Missouri, US	October 17, 2015	11.9	0.87
The Ghost Adventures Crew travels outside of Kansas City to Liberty, Missouri, for their lockdown inside the old Odd Fellows Asylum, the current location of the famous Belvoir Winery housed in the Odd Fellows Home. Formerly an old folks' home, hospital and orphanage, with over 10,000 reported deaths, they investigate these buildings along with an old bunker. The guys also uncover horrifying tales of the Odd Fellows secret society, which used human remains for their dark rituals.
133	10	"Clown Motel and Goldfield High School"	Tonopah, Nevada, US; Goldfield, Nevada, US	October 24, 2015	11.10	0.74
The Ghost Adventures Crew returns to Tonopah, Nevada, where Zak faces his fear of clown dolls during their lockdown at the Clown Motel. They also return to Goldfield, Nevada, in order to investigate the old Goldfield High School.
134	11	"Lava Hot Springs Inn"	Lava Hot Springs, Idaho, US	November 7, 2015	11.11	0.72
GAC travels to Lava Hot Springs, Idaho for their lockdown at the Lava Hot Springs Inn, where many paranormal claims have been reported for the past 27 years. Originally built as a hospital in 1924, the building was used as a rest home, and then, in 1988, it was converted into a hotel.

=== Season 12 (2016) ===
No. overall	No. in season	Title	Location(s)	Original release date	Prod. code	U.S. viewers (millions)
135	1	"Black Dahlia House"	Los Angeles, California, US	January 30, 2016	12.1	0.81
GAC travels to Los Angeles to investigate the John Sowden House where the notorious Black Dahlia Murder allegedly occurred. Zak tours Downtown Los Angeles locations associated with victim Elizabeth Short's life with crime historian Kim Cooper, whose tour company offers to walk in the footsteps of the real Black Dahlia. The guys conduct a seance with a psychic to contact alleged killer Dr. George Hodel. They experience negative energy, and audio and visual recordings give them clues about the murder.
136	2	"Secret Scientology Lab"	Los Angeles, California, US	February 6, 2016	12.2	0.78
GAC heads to the West Adams section in the greater Los Angeles area to investigate the Casa de Rosas compound that served as a secret Scientology lab. They encounter disturbing energy and audio tech Jay Wasley gets a mysterious burn mark on the back of his neck after provoking the spirit of the Church of Scientology founder L. Ron Hubbard.
137	3	"Bracken Fern Manor / Tudor House"	Lake Arrowhead, California, US	February 13, 2016	12.3	0.82
GAC head to Lake Arrowhead, California, to investigate two properties plagued with demonic activity; the Bracken Fern Manor, which was once used as a Mob-run getaway for the Hollywood elite during Prohibition, now currently a bed and breakfast, and the Tudor House, which is used as a performing and catering venue. Shockingly, the guys uncover a secret tunnel that allows a demon mimicking a Native American woman to travel between the two buildings.
138	4	"Return to the Riviera"	Las Vegas, Nevada, US	February 20, 2016	12.4	0.71
GAC return to Las Vegas, Nevada, to re-investigate the Riviera Hotel and Casino, which is scheduled for demolition. The guys invite four fans to join them for the unprecedented investigation of the entire hotel and casino.
139	5	"Chinese Town of Locke"	Walnut Grove, California, US	February 27, 2016	12.5	0.77
The Ghost Adventures Crew invites NBC's Today correspondent Dylan Dreyer to help investigate Locke, California, a ghost town formerly run by Chinese immigrants of the Tong, a criminal organization associated with the Chinese mafia. Their lock-down includes; the Dai Loy Museum, once an illegal gambling house, opium den and brothel where a cheating player was shot and killed, the Tong Building, where a man was attacked by an unseen force, and the Star Theater, where the singing spirit of Mai Ling is heard.
140	6	"Star of India"	San Diego, California, US	March 5, 2016	12.6	0.70
The Ghost Adventures Crew climbs aboard the Star of India, a 152-year-old merchant ship docked in San Diego that is part of the Maritime Museum of San Diego. Once a vessel for immigrants across the seas, it now carries the souls of a captain who committed suicide, a crew member who got crushed by an anchor, and the spirit of a child stowaway.
141	7	"Leslie's Family Tree"	Santaquin, Utah, US	March 12, 2016	12.7	0.90
GAC travel to Utah for their lockdown in Leslie's Family Tree Restaurant, a family-owned eatery, part of which is in a 100-year-old building. It's reportedly haunted by several aggressive ghosts who attack patrons and staff, poltergeist activity, and Native American spirits from the Ute tribe who were killed in the Walker War that took place in the area.
142	8	"Hell Hole Prison"	Yuma, Arizona, US	March 19, 2016	12.8	0.85
GAC head to Yuma to investigate the Yuma Territorial Prison, which earned the name Hell Hole due to the intense heat of the location and inhumane punishments dealt to the inmates, such as locking them in the Snake Den. They investigate to try to contact spirits of former inmates who perished in these inhumane conditions.
143	9	"The Domes"	Casa Grande, Arizona, US	March 26, 2016	12.9	0.87
GAC heads to the Arizona desert for their lockdown in The Domes, a collection of massive dome-shaped buildings. These unusual structures were built in 1982 by a circuit board company for their offices, but were left abandoned and used for satanic worshiping with animal and human sacrifices. Now, it said to be haunted by the spirits of Native Americans, cloak-like shadow figures, and demons, as well as the devil himself.
144	10	"Nevada State Prison"	Carson City, Nevada, US	July 16, 2016	12.10	0.66
GAC travel to Carson City, Nevada, for their lockdown at the notorious Nevada State Prison, the only prison in the state that the Department of Corrections still performs executions at. The guys try to communicate with the spirits of the 54 executed inmates and contact a demon named "Dante". Also, they investigate the house of a former NSP corrections officer who says this demon followed him home.
145	11	"Return to Winchester Mystery House"	San Jose, California, US	July 23, 2016	12.11	0.72
GAC return to the Winchester Mystery House in San Jose, California, to finish their season five lockdown that got cut short due to the death of Zak's grandmother.
146	12	"Stardust Ranch"	Buckeye, Arizona, US	July 30, 2016	12.12	0.63
GAC travel outside of Phoenix, Arizona, to the Stardust Ranch nestled in Rainbow Valley, a location noted for extraterrestrial sightings. They investigate to find closure for the strange figures and Grey aliens the ranch owner and his wife, who was nearly abducted, have both been seeing around their home and property. While Aaron, Billy and Jay track high levels of geomagnetic radiation on the land with GAC researcher Dave Schrader, Zak interviews Travis Walton whose alien abduction inspired the film Fire in the Sky.
147	13	"The Haunted Museum"	Las Vegas, Nevada, US	August 6, 2016	12.13	0.67
GAC investigate the Deadly Possessions Museum. a mansion that is being converted into a museum for the haunted items Zak has collected over the years. They investigate to find answers for the construction crew that were scared out of the location after coming into contact with spirits.

=== Season 13 (2016) ===
No. overall	No. in season	Title	Location(s)	Original release date	Prod. code	U.S. viewers (millions)
148	1	"Colorado Gold Mine"	Idaho Springs, Colorado, US	September 24, 2016	13.1	0.73
In the season 13 premiere, the Ghost Adventures Crew travel to Idaho Springs to investigate the haunted Phoenix Gold Mine, where a brutal murder took place and a malevolent spirits called "Tommyknockers", derived from Cornish folklore is known for their knocking in the deep tunnels. They also visit the nearby Comstock Mine after a worker got spooked by an entity while preparing the area for tours, and also investigate the Union Tunnel Mine, which is an old mine shaft that was recently rediscovered.
149	2	"Mackay Mansion"	Virginia City, Nevada, US	October 1, 2016	13.2	0.75
GAC return to Virginia City, Nevada, to investigate the Mackay Mansion, where it is believed to be haunted by the spirits of families who died on the property throughout the time of the Comstock Lode. They also investigate John Mackay's old bank after the owner says there is a negative entity tormenting workers who go down to the basement.
150	3	"Palace Saloon"	Prescott, Arizona, US	October 8, 2016	13.3	0.57
GAC travel to Prescott, Arizona, for their lockdown at the Palace Saloon, one of the most lavish saloons in Arizona, to search for spirits that died in high-stakes gambling related murders, and to make contact with a malevolent entity in the basement that attacks women. They're also called to investigate the "band house", a turn of the century-era home that the owner of the local Birdcage Saloon rents out to bands performing at her bar. They try to get an explanation for why these bands are fleeing from the property during rehearsal.
151	4	"Reseda House of Evil"	Los Angeles, California, US	October 15, 2016	13.4	0.79
GAC travel to the Reseda neighborhood of Los Angeles to investigate a home that affects all who enter it. Inhabitants are becoming drug addicts and many have committed suicide. The guys struggle to keep their sanity when this dangerous lockdown quickly turns into an emotional nightmare.
152	5	"Dorothea Puente Murder House"	Sacramento, California, US	October 22, 2016	13.5	0.72
After an occupant claims to be visited by the late Dorothea Puente, GAC arrive in Sacramento, California, to investigate the former home of the elderly serial killer. During the investigation, the crew finds potential evidence of undiscovered victims, and Zak is crippled by an unseen force.
153	6	"Hotel Metlen"	Dillon, Montana, US	November 12, 2016	13.6	0.67
GAC head to a Hollywood horror movie-style haunted Hotel Metlen in Dillon, Montana, to investigate claims of multiple hauntings, including the spirit of former resident and the co-owner's mother, Dorothy, who died in her room. Their lockdown takes them to the notorious third floor, which has been padlocked to the public for the last 20 years because of violent encounters. Aaron is left to fend for himself after being locked up in there alone, but suffers a panic attack.
154	7	"St. Ann's Retreat"	Logan Canyon, Utah, US	November 19, 2016	13.7	0.77
GAC travel to Logan Canyon, Utah, for their lockdown at St. Ann's Retreat, a former nunnery with a dark history. Originally a campground, the cabins contain an evil entity that possibly possessed night watchmen to hold 38 teenagers hostage in 1997. The now decrepit buildings were once used to punish nuns who had broken their vows, including a nun who got pregnant, and committed suicide after the mother drowned her baby in the swimming pool. The guys also investigate the surrounding forest, home of Satan worshipers.
155	8	"Twin Bridges Orphanage"	Twin Bridges, Montana, US	November 26, 2016	13.8	0.84
GAC travel to the tiny town of Twin Bridges, Montana to be the first paranormal team to investigate the abandoned Twin Bridges Orphanage, which is said to be haunted by the hundreds of child spirits who died on the property since it opened in 1894. During their lockdown, the guys try to make contact with the matrons who whipped their wards.
156	9	"Dumas Brothel"	Butte, Montana, US	December 3, 2016	13.9	0.76
GAC travels to historic Butte, Montana to investigate Dumas Brothel, one of the oldest brothels in America. An active bordello from 1890 to 1982, it's the longest-running house of prostitution. The owner is affected by negative spirits, including a ghost called "The Judge". During the lockdown, Zak gets a mysterious mark on his neck and loses track of time.
157	10	"Zalud House"	Porterville, California, US	December 10, 2016	13.10	0.71
GAC head to the small town of Porterville for their lockdown at the historic Zalud House, now a museum that is haunted by aggressive spirits. Zak takes particular interest in a 'cursed chair' that's haunted by family member, William Brookes, the son-in-law of original owner John Zalud, was murdered while sitting in it, and now it affects visitors who sit in it.
158	11	"Dakota's Sanatorium of Death"	San Haven, North Dakota, US	December 31, 2016	13.11	0.59
GAC visit outside of Dunseith, North Dakota, to investigate the San Haven Sanatorium. During the investigation, Zak almost accidentally walks off a ledge in the building. In addition with a slew of disturbing energies and capture a horrifying EVP.

=== Season 14 (2017) ===
No. overall	No. in season	Title	Location(s)	Original release date	Prod. code	U.S. viewers (millions)
159	1	"Stone Lion Inn"	Guthrie, Oklahoma, US	March 25, 2017	14.1	0.78
The Ghost Adventures Crew investigate the Stone Lion Inn in Guthrie, Oklahoma, where it is said the owner performs satanic rituals in the local cemetery. During the lockdown, Zak also uncovers the truth about what happened to the famous outlaw Elmer McCurdy after his death.
160	2	"Freak Show Murder House"	Los Angeles, California, US	April 1, 2017	14.2	0.64
GAC investigate the site of a 1996 double murder in Los Angeles' Chatsworth neighborhood. During their lockdown, the guys try to help the current owners, who sell and store oddity antiques in the house, by gathering chilling evidence of paranormal activity, but they are lured away from the location against their will.
161	3	"Samaritan Cult House"	Guthrie, Oklahoma, US	April 8, 2017	14.3	0.68
GAC travel to Guthrie, Oklahoma to investigate an abandoned prison, built in 1892, which in the 1990s served as the headquarters for the Samaritan Foundation, an organization run by cultist Linda Greene, which has rumored ties to murder and terrorism in the state. The guys make contact with murderer J.P. (James Phillips), who died here in 1907.
162	4	"Double Eagle Restaurant"	Mesilla, New Mexico, US; Las Cruces, New Mexico, US	April 15, 2017	14.4	0.67
GAC head to New Mexico to investigate the Double Eagle Restaurant and the Dona Ana County Courthouse. Both buildings have been plagued by death, leading to poltergeist activity that torments paranormal investigators.
163	5	"Silent Movie Theater"	Los Angeles, California, US	April 22, 2017	14.5	0.65
GAC arrive in sunny Los Angeles to investigate the infamous Silent Movie Theatre on Fairfax Avenue. During their lockdown, Zak delves deep into a double-murder of the theater's owner and a candy counter girl, learns of the strange death of a silent film preservationist who lived at the theater, and even contacts deceased actor Douglas Fairbanks Jr.
164	6	"Exorcism in Erie"	Erie, Colorado, US	April 29, 2017	14.6	0.69
GAC travels to a private residence in Erie, Colorado, along with Bishop Bryan Ouellette to perform an exorcism on Chris Stone in order to help rid him of a demonic attachment he obtained after trying to conjure a dark devil creature years ago at an occult home he called the Witch's House in Superior, Colorado.
165	7	"Skinwalker Canyon"	Ojo Amarillo, New Mexico, US	June 17, 2017	14.7	0.72
GAC is given special permission from the Navajo Nation to investigate the Ojo Amarillo Canyon, known to paranormal enthusiasts as Skinwalker Canyon, a place where many residents refuse to enter in fear of encountering shape-shifting creatures.
166	8	"Upper Fruitland Curse"	Upper Fruitland, New Mexico, US	June 24, 2017	14.8	0.72
GAC head to Upper Fruitland, New Mexico, to help a family who are troubled by the ghost of a faceless young boy. During the intense lockdown inside the Navajo Nation, the guys capture a chair moving on its own.
167	9	"Witches in Magna"	Magna, Utah, US	July 1, 2017	14.9	0.61
GAC investigate Nonna's Pizza, a family-owned pizzeria in Magna, Utah, where an evil witch used witchcraft to cast a spell that has the family fearing for their safety. During the lockdown, the guys try to draw out what's in the basement and get some violent responses.
168	10	"The Viper Room"	West Hollywood, California, US	July 8, 2017	14.10	0.71
GAC investigate the infamous Viper Room on West Hollywood's Sunset Strip. With a famous owner, the tragic death of a beloved actor, and the unsolved disappearance of a business partner, the nightclub is filled with sinister energy. During their lockdown, they communicate with River Phoenix who overdosed here on Halloween in 1993.
169	11	"Asylum 49"	Tooele, Utah, US	July 15, 2017	14.11	0.77
GAC return to Tooele, Utah, to investigate a recently abandoned nursing home that connected to the "Green Mile", a corridor of darkness that shares the same building with Asylum 49, a haunted attraction that was in operation during their original lockdown inside the Old Tooele Hospital in 2011.

=== Season 15 (2017–18) ===
No. overall	No. in season	Title	Location(s)	Original release date	Prod. code	U.S. viewers (millions)
170	1	"Golden Ghost Town"	Golden, Oregon, US	September 23, 2017	15.1	0.70
GAC travel to Golden, a ghost town near Wolf Creek that is haunted by spirits conjured up by occultists in witch camps in the woods. During the lockdown, Zak is overtaken by an aggressive entity, Aaron is incapacitated by a dark force, eerie figures appear and a voice warns of a demonic presence. They also visit Oregon Vortex to learn of ley lines.
171	2	"Ogden Possession"	Ogden, Utah, US	September 30, 2017	15.2	0.61
GAC travel to Ogden, Utah for a private investigation to help a family plagued by a demon who appears as a red-headed girl who is possessing the patriarch of the family.
172	3	"Albion Normal School"	Albion, Idaho, US	November 4, 2017	15.3	0.64
GAC head to Idaho to investigate the Albion State Normal School, where dark energy from satanic graffiti is affecting its staff. During the lockdown, Jay and an interviewee are marked with strange symbols behind their ears.
173	4	"Museum of the Mountain West"	Montrose, Colorado, US	November 11, 2017	15.4	0.68
GAC visit the Museum of the Mountain West in Montrose, Colorado, a collection of Old West buildings ranging from the 1840s to the 1940s, where something is threatening the health of its employees. During the lockdown, the guys uncover the property's violent history, investigated a building called the "Murder House", and gather disturbing evidence of a dangerous entity.
174	5	"Pythian Castle"	Springfield, Missouri, US	November 18, 2017	15.5	0.79
GAC travel to Springfield, Missouri to investigate Pythian Castle, a historic building infected with violent spirits who appear to mimic the living and deliver fatal premonitions.
175	6	"The Titanic Museum"	Branson, Missouri, US	November 25, 2017	15.6	0.82
GAC investigate the massive Titanic Museum in Branson, Missouri where employees believe the spirits of the 1,496 people who died on board RMS Titanic on April 14, 1912, have found their way to the museum dedicated to their memory.
176	7	"Wolf Creek Inn"	Wolf Creek, Oregon, US	December 2, 2017	15.7	0.67
GAC head to the Pacific Northwest for their lockdown in Wolf Creek Inn, a haunted tavern located in a state park in Oregon. They investigate paranormal claims of aggressive apparitions and a vampire-like creature that has attacked visitors in the past.
177	8	"Eureka Mining Town"	Eureka, Nevada, US	December 9, 2017	15.8	0.73
Zak and the crew travel to the small mining town of Eureka, Nevada, to investigate reports of an aggressive spirit at a hotel as well as a mysterious tunnel system built by oppressed Chinese laborers.
178	9	"Sin City Exorcism"	Las Vegas, Nevada, US	December 16, 2017	15.9	0.68
Zak and the crew travel to Las Vegas to help a family plagued by a demonic force in their home. The man and his siblings believe the entity attached itself to their mother and caused her death.
179	10	"Phelps Dodge Hospital"	Ajo, Arizona, US	January 6, 2018	15.10	0.70
GAC investigate the abandoned Phelps Dodge Hospital located next to an open-pit copper mine where the caretaker is being choked by an unseen force while he sleeps. A strange conflict arises between Zak and Aaron after objects are thrown at them and a violent threat EVP is captured on their digital recorder.
180	11	"The Slaughter House"	Tucson, Arizona, US	January 13, 2018	15.11	0.58
GAC travel to Arizona for their lockdown inside "The Slaughter House", a former meatpacking plant-turned haunted attraction. Rapper Post Malone joins the guys during their investigation, where Zak is affected by dark entity.

=== Season 16 (2018) ===
No. overall	No. in season	Title	Location(s)	Original release date	Prod. code	U.S. viewers (millions)
181	1	"Ripley's Believe It or Not"	Hollywood, California, US	March 24, 2018	16.1	0.83
In the season 16 premiere, GAC head to Hollywood, for their lockdown at the iconic Ripley's Believe It or Not Odditorium, a museum where employees are affected by its rare artifacts which include, an ancient Egyptian mummy foot, an Asmat skull, a sacrificial sword and a West African nail fetish hate god.
182	2	"The Alley of Darkness"	North Hollywood, California, US	March 31, 2018	16.2	0.80
GAC get locked down at The Alley, a legendary recording studio established in 1973 where many musicians came to get away from the outside world. It's been plagued with dark presences that want to hide the studio's secrets tied to its past of sex, drugs and rock and roll.
183	3	"Kennedy Mine"	Jackson, California, US	April 7, 2018	16.3	0.71
GAC investigate two haunted mines in Jackson, California. First, the Argonaut, which was the site of a 1922 fire that killed 47 miners. Then the Kennedy, which has had its share of deaths that seems to be ground zero for hauntings.
184	4	"Old Gila County Jail and Courthouse"	Globe, Arizona, US	April 14, 2018	16.4	0.81
GAC travel to Globe, Arizona, for their lockdown at Old Gila Jail and Courthouse which is riddled with violence and mystery. Their investigation reveals unexplained high EMF spikes and they learn of how an assassin shot Kingsley Olds, an inmate who drowned two little girls in a river, through the courthouse window.
185	5	"Hotel Léger"	Mokelumne Hill, California, US	June 16, 2018	16.5	0.94
GAC head to the old mining boomtown of Mokelumne Hill, California, to investigate Hotel Léger, one of the state's oldest operating hotels. A devastating fire and the town's violent history has left an evil presence in the basement, which used to be the old jail, now threatens the safety of employees and guests.
186	6	"Enchanted Forest"	Turner, Oregon, US	June 23, 2018	16.6	0.88
GAC investigate strange phenomena at the Enchanted Forest in Turner, Oregon, where Aaron went as a child. The discovery of a Native American bloody battle on the grounds of the park, leads Zak to believe they're on skinwalker land. Also a real haunted house built in the 1970s with residual energy could be responsible for spirit manifestations.
187	7	"The Washoe Club: Final Chapter"	Virginia City, Nevada, US	June 30, 2018	16.7	0.86
GAC return to Virginia City, Nevada to investigate the Washoe Club for the very last time. A highly personal communication brings the guys to tears, and they experience a chilling exchange with the all too familiar spirits.
188	8	"Lewis Flats School"	Deming, New Mexico, US	July 7, 2018	16.8	0.80
GAC travel to Deming, New Mexico to investigate the former Lewis Flats Elementary School which sits on Apache land that was soaked in blood with their violent struggle to keep it from pioneers in the 1800s. The mysterious school burned down in the 1950s, was reopened, and then closed in the 70s. Today, it's the Adobe Deli Steakhouse, filled with taxidermy and oddities and reports of unexplained activity and spiritual attacks.
189	9	"Kay's Hollow"	Kaysville, Utah, US	July 14, 2018	16.9	0.99
GAC head to Utah to investigate the remains of Kay's Cross, a large stone cross erected in 1946 in honor of cult leader Krishna Venta. It's said to be a dark magnet for satanic rituals, suicides, possession and even death. A shadowy figure with red eyes and a strange purple fog leads to one heart-pounding investigation.

=== Season 17 (2018) ===
No. overall	No. in season	Title	Location(s)	Original release date	Prod. code	U.S. viewers (millions)
190	1	"Idaho State Reform School"	St. Anthony, Idaho, US	November 3, 2018	17.1	0.88
GAC travel to St. Anthony, Idaho to investigate the Idaho State Industrial School, a former school with a dark history of suicide and death. The guys capture paranormal activity in the infirmary of a ghost doctor and inside the women's dormitory that proves the children who died are still trapped on the grounds, including Hope, a 14-year-old girl who took her own life by hanging herself in 1941.
191	2	"Westerfeld House"	San Francisco, California, US	November 10, 2018	17.2	0.83
GAC head to San Francisco to investigate the historic Westerfeld House, which played host to satanic rituals performed by underground occultist filmmaker Kenneth Anger, Church of Satan founder Anton LaVey and Manson family member Bobby Beausoleil.
192	3	"Crisis in Oakdale"	Oakdale, California, US	November 17, 2018	17.3	0.82
GAC lands in Oakdale, California, to investigate a sinister energy darkening the home of a grieving family. During the emotionally charged and frightening lockdown, Billy and Aaron are mysteriously debilitated and Jay witnesses a door open by itself.
193	4	"Tintic Mining District"	Eureka, Utah, US	November 24, 2018	17.4	0.82
GAC head to the Tintic Mining District, a former mining camp in Eureka, Utah, to investigate several haunted buildings; The Gatley Building, a former saloon and billiards hall from 1898 where a possible murder weapon could have bee thrown down a well, the old McCormick Bank where aggressive spirits like to curse, the Flitch Mansion, home paranormal activity from occult rituals that were performed in the home. Special guest investigator, Julie Jordan, senior writer for People Magazine joins the team for their terrifying lockdown in which an unprecedented piece of evidence horrifies everyone.
194	5	"Terror in Fontana"	Fontana, California, US	December 1, 2018	17.5	0.81
GAC travel to Fontana, California, to investigate the suburban home of a family who claim they're being terrorized by a demon. During the intense lockdown, the guys are shocked by a satanic message sent through a child's toy.
195	6	"Riverside Plane Graveyard"	Riverside, California, US	December 8, 2018	17.6	0.65
GAC investigate the March Field Air Museum in Riverside, California, where employees and visitors have heard voices, seen artifacts move and even felt spirits pass through their bodies.

=== Season 18 (2019) ===
No. overall	No. in season	Title	Location(s)	Original release date	Prod. code	U.S. viewers (millions)
196	1	"Gates of Hell House"	Las Vegas, Nevada, US	February 23, 2019	18.1	0.69
GAC are in their hometown of Las Vegas to investigate intense paranormal activity at The Freakling Bros. Trilogy of Terror, an infamous haunted attraction where employees have reported brushes with a terrifying shadow figure and violent demonic entities.
197	2	"Palomino Club"	Las Vegas, Nevada, US	March 2, 2019	18.2	0.65
GAC are in Las Vegas to investigate the city's oldest gentleman's club; The Palomino. Several deaths have occurred in the club, leading to a charged paranormal atmosphere and fueling a violent behavior among its employees and patrons.
198	3	"Lutes Casino"	Yuma, Arizona, US	March 9, 2019	18.3	0.68
GAC travel to Yuma, Arizona, to investigate a series of mysterious attacks inside the Lutes Casino, and two abandoned spaces in this building; the Lyric Theater and the Central Hotel. The intense lockdown reveals a child-like entity with a dark, sinister presence roaming the building.
199	4	"Melrose Hotel"	Grand Junction, Colorado, US	March 16, 2019	18.4	0.71
GAC investigate the Melrose Hotel, an historic hotel plagued by dark spirits in Grand Junction, Colorado. The vicious entities seem to target only men and may have even been responsible for a brutal murder involving the hotel's previous owners.
200	5	"Binion's Hotel and Casino"	Las Vegas, Nevada, US	March 23, 2019	18.5	0.84
GAC investigate two historic hotels inside the infamous Binion's Casino in Las Vegas, Nevada which has a dark and violent history. They investigate two long-abandoned hotels: Hotel Apache, which has many escape tunnels and Room 400, a secret room used by mob boss Benny Binion and his son Ted who died in the room. And The Mint, a 25-story tower hotel that is sealed off and left frozen in time that has created a paranormal pressure cooker just waiting to explode.
201	6	"The Woodbury: Home of American Horror Story"	Altadena, California, US	April 26, 2019	18.6	0.58
GAC investigate the aggressive spirits who roam the Woodbury–Story House, a 130-year-old estate in Altadena, California, that's been used as a location for various films and TV series.

=== Season 19 (2019) ===
No. overall	No. in season	Title	Location(s)	Original release date	Prod. code	U.S. viewers (millions)
202	1	"Crescent Hotel"	Eureka Springs, Arkansas, US	June 8, 2019	19.1	0.61
GAC investigate the famous Crescent Hotel, an historic hotel plagued by the restless spirits of cancer victims of quack doctor Norman Baker in Eureka Springs, Arkansas. They capture a curtain moving on its own and make contact with "Michael", a stonemason who fell during construction in Room 218, the hotel's most active and notorious ghost.
203	2	"St. Ignatius Hospital"	Colfax, Washington, US	June 15, 2019	19.2	0.66
GAC stick together as they investigate St. Ignatius Hospital, a 127-year-old hospital in Colfax, Washington. The building may be abandoned, but it's far from quiet with reports of visitors hearing strange growls and being attacked by unseen hands.
204	3	"Mount Wilson Ranch"	Pioche, Nevada, US	June 22, 2019	19.3	0.69
GAC travel to Pioche, Nevada, to investigate the mysterious Mount Wilson Ranch, that's known for its concentration of supernatural energy and countless reports of extraterrestrial activity.
205	4	"Panic in Amarillo"	Amarillo, Texas, US	June 29, 2019	19.4	0.69
GAC rush to a private home in Amarillo, Texas, where a family is reaching its breaking point with an aggressive entity. It's the guys' most complex and challenging investigation yet as they search for the truth.
206	5	"Union Hotel"	Benicia, California, US	July 6, 2019	19.6	0.62
GAC travel to the Bay Area to investigate aggressive paranormal activity at the Union Hotel, an historic hotel that has endured the brutal California Gold Rush, a smallpox epidemic and a period as a seedy flophouse.
207	6	"Idaho State Tuberculosis Hospital"	Gooding, Idaho, US	July 13, 2019	19.7	0.59
GAC investigate a former tuberculosis hospital in Gooding, Idaho, that's been converted into an inn. The owners and their staff have been terrorized by the spirit of an angry old man, heard whispering voices, and seen ghostly children wandering around.
208	7	"A Haunting in Scottsdale"	Scottsdale, Arizona, US	July 20, 2019	19.8	0.72
GAC investigate an Arizona home sitting on land once occupied by a Native American tribe. The owner claims he's been affected by a dark, aggressive energy and believes an ancient entity is haunting his property.

=== Season 20 (2019) ===
No. overall	No. in season	Title	Location(s)	Original release date	Prod. code	U.S. viewers (millions)
209	1	"Albion Castle"	San Francisco, California, US	November 2, 2019	20.1	0.57
GAC are in the Hunter's Point section of San Francisco investigating Albion Castle, a mysterious castle that was once a brewery built on top of sacred caverns said to be haunted by a female apparition believed to be an Ohlone Indian. The current owners claim to be plagued by paranormal activity in almost every corner of the property, including the spring water caverns used to make beer.
210	2	"Cerro Gordo Ghost Town"	Keeler, California, US	November 9, 2019	20.2	0.61
GAC trek a treacherous cliff-side trail 8,500 feet up into the Inyo Mountains to investigate the Cerro Gordo Mines, a former mining town haunted by the lost souls of its former residents, which include children who were locked in a trunk and a poker player who was shot to death.
211	3	"Pasadena Ritual House"	Pasadena, California, US	November 16, 2019	20.3	0.60
GAC visit Pasadena, California to investigate the home of self-proclaimed Satanist, Richard-Lael Lillard. A seance conducted inside this historic Victorian house reveals an inhuman presence which attaches itself to Aaron, trying to communicate with him.

=== Season 21 (2020) ===
No. overall	No. in season	Title	Location(s)	Original release date	Prod. code	U.S. viewers (millions)
212	1	"Horror in Biggs"	Biggs, California, US	February 27, 2020	21.1	0.58
GAC investigate a demonic entity terrorizing a small California town of Biggs. Many locals believe this malicious spirit is responsible for a series of horrific deaths, and an exorcism may be the only way to save their souls from its dark clutches.
213	2	"Franklin Castle"	Cleveland, Ohio, US	March 5, 2020	21.2	0.48
GAC travel to Cleveland, Ohio to investigate Franklin Castle, the most-haunted residence in Ohio. Built by Hannes Tiedemann, a German banker in the early 1880s, it is believed that he and his family were cursed after they all died. Whispers of murder, suicide, and arson have led many to believe the majestic mansion carries a deadly curse.
214	3	"Union Brewery of Death"	Virginia City, Nevada, US	March 12, 2020	21.3	0.53
GAC are back in Virginia City, Nevada, to investigate the dark spirits haunting a historic brewery. A devastating fire and a short stint as a funeral home has stained the building, creating an energy unlike anything they've encountered.
215	4	"Nightmare in Antelope"	Antelope, California, US	March 19, 2020	21.4	0.58
GAC travel to the Antelope Valley in Sacramento, California, to confront a demonic entity that's tearing a family apart. Zak believes an exorcism may be the only way to save them from the dark and powerful forces plaguing their home.
216	5	"Goodwin Home Invasion"	Las Vegas, Nevada, US	March 26, 2020	21.5	0.57
Aaron's father, Don, calls Zak and the crew to his Las Vegas home to investigate threatening paranormal activity. The terrifying apparition of a little girl and a dark, powerful presence a neighbor believes is a witch has left Don scared for his life.
217	6	"Haunted Hollow Forest"	West Haven, Utah, US	April 2, 2020	21.6	0.50
GAC investigate reports of a mysterious entity called the "Gray Man" haunting Haunted Hollow Forest, a Halloween attraction sitting on an ancient plot of Ute Indian land in West Haven, Utah. They uncover compelling evidence that suggests the paranormal creature originated with a shaman's curse.
218	7	"The Chinatown Poltergeist"	Las Vegas, Nevada, US	April 9, 2020	21.7	0.51
GAC investigate claims of poltergeist activity at The Golden Tiki, a strange tiki bar in Las Vegas' Chinatown filled with morbid artifacts. The staff believes a horrendous shooting in the bar on January 14, 1995 may be responsible for recent sightings of moving objects, unseen attacks, flying shadow figures, a ghost girl and a haunted booth. Also, Zak is honored at the bar with his own shrunken head.
219	8	"Beneath the Bonanza"	Virginia City, Nevada, US	April 16, 2020	21.8	0.55
GAC add another chapter in their Virginia City, Nevada legacy when they investigate the Bonanza Saloon, a 180-year-old building where mostly women are being violently attacked by an entity that inhabits the basement. A haunted artifact known as the "Suicide Table", a losing Faro card table that was saved from the recent Delta Saloon explosion may be responsible for the aggressive activity. Note: This is the 8th lockdown location that GAC has investigated in Virginia City. The previous places were the Washoe Club, St. Mary's Art Center, Silver Queen Hotel, Union Brewery, MacKay Mansion, Chollar Mine, and the Gold Hill Hotel.
220	9	"Industrial District of the Damned"	Salt Lake City, Utah, US	April 23, 2020	21.9	0.64
GAC investigate a 120-year-old building, housing an art studio in Salt Lake City's industrial district. Local business owners claim paranormal activity has recently ramped up after a break-in revealed remnants of a dark ritual in the basement that took place during winter solstice. Also, there are reports of an "old hag" or evil witch entity seen in mirrors and heard cackling there.
221	10	"London Bridge"	Lake Havasu City, Arizona, US	April 30, 2020	21.10	0.62
GAC head to Lake Havasu, Arizona, to investigate one of the most famous bridges in the world, London Bridge, built in the 1830s and transferred from England in 1968. A dark paranormal energy engulfs the massive structure, which is the possible site of human sacrifice in the form of immurement, attracting death, despair and even the ghost of Jack the Ripper sent from the foggy streets of London.
222	11	"The Graber Farm Entity"	Ontario, California, US	May 7, 2020	21.11	0.53
GAC head to Ontario, California, to investigate the Graber Olive House, a family owned and operated olive farm since 1894. Today, it's ripe with paranormal activity, particularly by a century old vicious entity known as "The Creeper" that's been tormenting the staff and ghost hunters while in the vat room.
223	12	"Bloodshed in the Bordello"	Globe, Arizona, US	May 14, 2020	21.12	0.54
GAC travel to Tenderloin District in Globe, Arizona, to investigate the Drift Inn Saloon, a former bordello that was a hive of sinful behavior in the early 1900s. Two unsolved murders and a deadly shooting may have been fueled by the dark energy that surrounds the historic building.

=== Season 22 (2020–21) ===
Beginning with the "House of Brujeria" episode, all episodes are exclusively premiered on Discovery+

No. overall	No. in season	Title	Location(s)	Original release date	Prod. code	U.S. viewers (millions)
224	1	"Ghost Train of Ely"	Ely, Nevada, US	November 5, 2020	22.1	0.41
Zak and the crew hop aboard a 100-year-old steam engine for a lockdown they will never forget. It's a paranormal-packed ride as the guys investigate reports of apparitions and strange anomalies along the historic Nevada Northern Railway.
225	2	"El Rancho Hotel"	Gallup, New Mexico, US	November 12, 2020	22.2	0.48
Zak and the crew investigate a historic New Mexico hotel where a spike in paranormal activity has caused several employees to quit. The guys suspect the dark wave of supernatural energy was unleashed after a demonic ritual was conducted on the property.
226	3	"Painted Lady Brothel"	Albuquerque, New Mexico, US	November 19, 2020	22.3	0.35
The crew travels to Albuquerque, New Mexico, to investigate a former brothel and saloon inhabited by an aggressive male spirit. The vicious entity pushes the guys to their limits as they try to get the bottom of the haunting and save the owner from further harm.
227	4	"The Comedy Store"	Los Angeles, California, US	January 1, 2021	22.4	N/A
The crew kicks off 2021 with a lockdown at Los Angeles' legendary comedy club, The Comedy Store. The building that has collected so many laughs is shadowed by tragedy and violence, creating a paranormal energy unlike any other during the star-studded investigation.
228	5	"House of Brujeria"	Las Vegas, Nevada, US	February 12, 2021	22.5	N/A
Zak and the crew respond to a paranormal crisis in Las Vegas. Under constant attack, a grieving widow fears she has been possessed by a dark entity. The investigation takes a shocking turn when her frightened daughter reveals a deadly hex may have been placed upon them.
229	6	"Curse of Ranch Island"	Las Vegas, Nevada, US	March 26, 2021	22.6	N/A
Zak and the crew investigate rampant paranormal activity at a once blissful communal compound outside of Las Vegas, known as Ranch Island. When Zak is overcome by a dark energy, the team fears he may be in danger from a spirit trapped on the property.
230	7	"Disturbed in Wickenburg"	Vulture City, Arizona, US	April 2, 2021	22.7	N/A
The crew returns to Vulture City, Arizona, to investigate after attendees of a paranormal conference were negatively affected by a dark energy in the once booming mining town. Zak learns that active mining on the site may have unleashed an ancient evil.
231	8	"The Joshua Tree Inn"	Joshua Tree, California, US	April 9, 2021	22.8	N/A
Zak and the crew check into the desert motel where country-rock pioneer Gram Parsons died in 1973. With help from special guest investigator, singer and social media personality Loren Gray, the team is in for an especially emotional and terrifying night as they investigate the intelligent and sometimes malicious paranormal energy that permeates the property.
232	9	"Mayhem in Millville"	Millville, Utah, US	April 16, 2021	22.9	N/A
Zak and the crew investigate a Utah home owned by a descendant of the prominent Jessop polygamist family. Tenants fear evil has taken up residence in the basement, putting the guys in serious danger.
233	10	"Benson Grist Mill"	Stansbury Park, Utah, US	April 23, 2021	22.10	N/A
Zak and the crew travel to Utah to investigate a 150-year-old grist mill haunted by shadow figures, poltergeist activity and an angry male presence. The guys are overwhelmed by the property's dark energy as they attempt to contact a dead girl named Alice.
234	11	"Lost Souls of the Berkeley"	San Diego, California, US	April 30, 2021	22.11	N/A
Zak and the crew board a steam ferry from the 1800s to investigate escalating paranormal activity. The staff fears something dark has awakened on the historical vessel after lying dormant for months during the COVID-19 pandemic.

=== Season 23 (2021) ===
No. overall	No. in season	Title	Location(s)	Original release date	Prod. code
235	1	"The Great Saltair Curse"	Great Salt Lake, Utah, US	July 22, 2021	23.1
The GAC is on the banks of Utah's Great Salt Lake to investigate The Great Saltair, a century-old music venue that is host to terrifying hauntings, and plagued by misfortune, disaster and even death. Many believe the property is haunted by Saltair Sally, a woman whose body was found on the property in 2000, and evidence suggests the surrounding land is cursed, amplifying the hostile paranormal energy. During their investigation, the team is plagued by intense physical afflictions, disembodied voices, unexplained figures and an array of frightening anomalies.
236	2	"Terror at the Toy Shop"	Hollywood, California, US	July 29, 2021	23.2
Zak and the crew encounter some of the most incredible poltergeist activity ever at Hollywood Toys & Costumes, a haunted costume shop in Hollywood, California. Riddled with darkness and tragedy, the supernaturally-charged building takes the guys on a ride they will never forget during an incredibly dynamic investigation.
237	3	"Haunting in the Hills"	Hollywood, California, US	August 5, 2021	23.3
The GAC investigates the Hollywood Hills home of model and television personality Holly Madison. She is experiencing disturbing paranormal activity, including demonic growls, and suspects that whatever haunts the property is preying on her fear.
238	4	"Territorial Enterprise"	Virginia City, Nevada, US	August 12, 2021	23.4
Zak and the crew open a terrifying new chapter in Virginia City, Nevada, a haunted town that's kept the crew coming back again and again. This time, they are focusing on two places in town, the Territory Enterprise Building and the Knights of Pythias building. Locals suspect the town's connection to a secret society may have opened a portal to the netherworld.
239	5	"Emergency in Elk Grove"	Elk Grove, California, US	August 19, 2021	23.5
The GAC is called to Elk Grove, California, to help a grieving woman who believes she is being terrorized by a demon and fears for her safety. The case takes an even more twisted turn when she reveals that the dark presence haunting her may be responsible for her father's death.
240	6	"Carbon County Chaos"	Helper, Utah, US	August 26, 2021	23.6
When the small town of Helper, Utah, is under siege by dark forces, the mayor calls on the GAC for help. She suspects that recent renovations to two historic buildings may be behind the surge in paranormal activity.

=== Season 24 (2022) ===
No. overall	No. in season	Title	Location(s)	Original release date	Prod. code
241	1	"Montecito Mansion of Mystery"	Montecito, California, US	March 10, 2022	24.1
Zak senses a historic mansion with a tragic and mysterious past in Montecito, California, has called to him. When the crew attempts to re-create a séance in the home's majestic main hall, they capture some of their most compelling evidence to date.
242	2	"Mountain Oaks Mayhem"	La Crescenta, California, US	March 17, 2022	24.2
Zak and the Ghost Adventures team gather in La Crescenta, California, to investigate an abandoned home that has been infected with evil. The dark forces that dwell there tore a family apart, and anyone who dares step inside the house is left fearing for their life.
243	3	"Pacific Grove Nightmare"	Pacific Grove, California, US	March 24, 2022	24.3
The Ghost Adventures team arrive in Pacific Grove, California, to investigate a doll shop overwhelmed by dark energy. Shelves of dolls and puppets appear to offer up disturbing clues as the search for evidence leaves the team drained and disoriented.
244	4	"Whitmore Mansion"	Nephi, Utah, US	March 31, 2022	24.4
Zak and the crew investigate a Utah mansion soaked in tragedy and bloodshed. Unexplained paranormal activity has the new owner desperate for answers, and the team is concerned that a portal to hell has unleashed a negative entity into the home.
245	5	"Panic on Pine Street"	Paso Robles, California, US	April 7, 2022	24.5
The team investigates poltergeist activity at a historic saloon in Paso Robles, California. The activity is so relentless that staff and guests do not feel safe on the premises. Zak suspects it may be the sole work of an entity called "The Old Hag."
246	6	"LA Police Station Invasion"	Los Angeles, California, US	April 14, 2022	24.6
The crew is called to the Los Angeles Police Museum to confront a dark presence that has invaded the once-thriving precinct. Zak believes the disturbing activity is linked to the macabre artifacts from some of LA's most notorious crimes.
247	7	"Petrified in Pahrump"	Pahrump, Nevada, US	April 21, 2022	24.7
The Ghost Adventures crew are called to a desolate Nevada town to investigate a winery allegedly built atop sacred burial grounds. Fatal accidents plague the property, and the terrified staff is stalked by an evil presence. Can Zak get to the bottom of the deadly curse?
248	8	"Steinbeck House Haunting"	Salinas, California, US	April 28, 2022	24.8
Zak, Aaron, Billy and Jay travel to Salinas, California, to investigate the birthplace of iconic author John Steinbeck. For decades, witnesses, including Steinbeck himself, have felt a dark presence in the home. Could a portal be drawing spirits to the property?

=== Season 25 (2022) ===
No. overall	No. in season	Title	Location(s)	Original release date	Prod. code
249	1	"Henderson Hell House"	Henderson, Nevada, US	September 15, 2022	25.1
The GAC rush to help a Nevada family who claim paranormal activity sent one parent to the hospital, and fear their young daughter may be next. The crew works urgently to uncover the dark source of the psychological attacks hiding inside the home.
250	2	"Old Bullion Plaza School"	Miami, Arizona, US	September 22, 2022	25.2
Zak and the crew head to an Arizona mining town to investigate a former school where horrendous child abuse took place. The team captures some of their best evidence in years as they unlock the dark secrets that lay entombed within the walls of the massive building.
251	3	"Acadia Ranch Sanatorium"	Oracle, Arizona, US	October 6, 2022	25.3
The crew go far off the beaten path in Arizona to investigate an abandoned sanatorium. Dozens of deaths, including the murder of a child, have left a heavy residue of pain and suffering on the building, making it a hotbed for aggressive poltergeist activity.
252	4	"Nightmare at the Roxie"	Los Angeles, California, US	October 13, 2022	25.4
The GAC head to downtown Los Angeles to investigate the long-abandoned Roxie Theatre. The site of a mysterious suicide, the once-majestic movie house has been left to rot, making it the perfect refuge for lost souls—along with a dark, foreboding energy.
253	5	"Los Feliz Murder House, Part 1"	Los Angeles, California, US	October 20, 2022	25.5
The GAC gain access to a Los Angeles mansion where a gruesome murder-suicide that made tabloid headlines and became urban lore took place sixty years ago. In the first-ever paranormal investigation of the long-shuttered residence, they uncover shocking secrets and a terrifying presence.
254	6	"Los Feliz Murder House, Part 2"	Los Angeles, California, US	October 27, 2022	25.6
Zak and the crew continue their confrontation with a dark presence that has overtaken the Los Feliz neighborhood's infamous hillside mansion. The investigation turns emotional when they conduct an ancient Sumerian ritual to open a portal to the other side.
255	7	"Lost Souls of Kingman"	Kingman, Arizona, US	November 3, 2022	25.7
Zak and the crew investigate an Arizona high school where students and faculty are troubled by paranormal experiences. Is the ghostly activity linked to an abandoned cemetery buried beneath the school? Or are the victims of a deadly explosion calling out from beyond the grave?
256	8	"Lovelock Triangle"	Lovelock, Nevada, US	November 10, 2022	25.8
The GAC visit a mysterious town in Nevada that is plagued by paranormal activity. Is a murdered witch's curse responsible for the haunting? Or is it linked to the dark energy vortex created by a cave that once concealed a grisly secret?
257	9	"Curse of Catalina Island"	Avalon, California, US	November 17, 2022	25.9
The GAC sets sail for a Southern California island steeped in supernatural phenomena. And the epicenter of the paranormal activity is a sprawling theater that once housed the disinterred bones of the island's indigenous people.
258	10	"Vengeance in Oxnard"	Oxnard, California, US	November 24, 2022	25.10
The crew sails into the coastal town of Oxnard, California, to help a couple tormented by unseen forces in their house. Zak makes a surprising connection as the team attempts to unmask the driving force behind the negative energy in the stately home.

=== Season 26 (2023) ===
No. overall	No. in season	Title	Location(s)	Original release date	Prod. code
259	1	"Hotel Barclay"	Los Angeles, California, US	June 7, 2023	26.1
The GAC returns to LA's Skid Row district to investigate a nearly abandoned building steeped in a dark, grisly history that rivals the Hotel Cecil; the crew have their hands full as both the dead and the living push back on the investigation.: Note: This episode is not available on discovery+
260	2	"Lockdown in Lancaster"	Lancaster, California, US	June 14, 2023	26.2
The crew pierces the seal on California's Mira Loma Detention Center; decades of death, violence and bloodshed have scarred this massive compound, painting a thick layer of doom on every square inch and delivering some of the most solid evidence yet.
261	3	"Fear in Flagstaff"	Flagstaff, Arizona, US	June 21, 2023	26.3
Zak and the crew check in for a night of terror at the Weatherford Hotel, where guests and staff have reported troubling paranormal experiences for decades. The chaotic spirits trapped within are wreaking havoc, and the GAC may be the only ones who can help.
262	4	"Stow House Haunting"	Goleta, California, US	June 28, 2023	26.4
Echoes of a past investigation come into focus as Zak and the crew investigate the Stow House, a stately California ranch steeped in tragedy; a dark energy has taken root on the land, and the team must unravel its haunting secrets to help the terrified caretakers.
263	5	"Mentryville Ghost Town"	Mentryville, California, US	July 5, 2023	26.5
Zak and the crew venture to California's first oil boomtown to investigate reports of ghostly activity inside its buildings and glowing anomalies in the surrounding hills; chaos ensues as the guys attempt to unravel the mystery of Mentryville.
264	6	"Hotel San Carlos"	Phoenix, Arizona, US	July 12, 2023	26.6
The crew peels back the glamorous façade of the Hotel San Carlos to expose a darkness that's said to drive people mad; the team encounters a demonic presence that could be responsible for countless deaths on the property.
265	7	"King Gillette Ranch"	Calabasas, California, US	July 19, 2023	26.7
Zak and the crew visit the King Gillette Ranch, a sprawling compound built on sacred land. Its dark history plus a brush with a religious cult has birthed violent spirit activity that drains the living of their energy, making this the GAC's heaviest investigation yet..
266	8	"Abandoned in Elko"	Elko, Nevada, US	August 2, 2023	26.8
Zak and crew awaken hostile spirits in sleepy Elko, Nevada, when they investigate the Commercial Hotel and Casino. The abandoned building's rough history of lawless cowboys, cutthroat gamblers and exploited women fuels a malevolent energy. Can the team resist its dark pull?
267	9	"Village of Lost Souls"	Los Angeles, California, US	August 9, 2023	26.9
Zak and the crew investigate reports of vicious paranormal attacks at LA's Heritage Square Museum. As the team explores this peculiar collection of Victorian homes, they suspect a dark portal is responsible for shadow figure sightings and aggressive poltergeist activity.
268	10	"Terror in Tempe"	Tempe, Arizona, US	August 16, 2023	26.10
Zak and the crew are called to Tempe, Arizona, to investigate the old Borden Milk Co. Creamery and Ice Factory, a building awash with dark and disturbing paranormal activity. The team lands in the crosshairs of dueling entities as they dig deep into the colossal factory's troubled past.
269	11	"The Beast of West Hills"	Los Angeles, California, US	August 23, 2023	26.11
Zak and the crew descend upon a Southern California park to investigate the Shadow Ranch, a historic ranch house in use as a preschool haunted by tragedy and violent deaths. The team wants to determine if an ancient tribal tale of vengeance has continued to cast a dark curse on this former homestead.

=== Season 27 (2023) ===
No. overall	No. in season	Title	Location(s)	Original release date	Prod. code
270	1	"Sutro Ghost Town"	Sutro, Nevada, US	October 11, 2023	27.1
Zak and the crew delve into the darkness that surrounds the historic and very haunted town of Sutro, Nevada. The team suspects an old mining tunnel is fueling the abandoned settlement's ominous aura as they uncover numerous deaths, disasters and mysterious fires.: Note: This episode isn't available on discovery+
271	2	"Ghost Island"	Great Salt Lake, Utah, US	October 18, 2023	27.2
Zak and the crew brave a brutal winter blizzard to confront an aggressive presence at an abandoned ranch located off the coast of Utah's Great Salt Lake. Unmarked graves and whispers of a curse throw a shadow over the investigation as the guys seek out the dark, unseeable force.
272	3	"Scotty's Castle"	Death Valley National Park, California, US	October 25, 2023	27.3
Zak and the crew trek through California's Death Valley to investigate a sprawling complex shrouded in mystery. The guys find themselves captivated by the desert villa's dark, powerful energy as they explore its flood- and fire-ravaged grounds. Who or what is feeding this ominous aura?
273	4	"Orcutt Ranch"	Los Angeles, California, US	November 1, 2023	27.4
Zak and the crew suspect evil forces are afoot as they investigate a California estate haunted by rumors of secret rituals in the basement and a gruesome double homicide next door. The team treads on very dark grounds as they attempt to unravel the mystery.
274	5	"Nightmare in Northridge"	Los Angeles, California, US	November 8, 2023	27.5
Zak and the crew don their spiritual armor to battle a dark, invasive energy in a Los Angeles area home. Fearing a demonic attachment, the team calls in an exorcist to help dissipate the evil cloud that overshadows the deeply religious family who lives there.

=== Season 28 (2024) ===
No. overall	No. in season	Title	Location(s)	Original release date	Prod. code
275	1	"Terror on 25th Street"	Ogden, Utah, US	May 22, 2024	28.1
Zak and the crew head to historic Ogden, Utah, to explore two adjacent buildings that are overrun with dark spiritual activity. One of the buildings once housed a thriving brothel, and locals suspect its former madam is still running her business from the grave.
276	2	"LA Hospital of Horror"	Los Angeles, California, US	May 29, 2024	28.2
Zak and the crew gain unprecedented access to a historic Los Angeles hospital to expose a demonic energy that has trapped countless souls inside the massive facility. This malevolent presence is a force to be reckoned with as the team explores the abandoned halls.
277	3	"Hotel Congress"	Tucson, Arizona, US	June 5, 2024	28.3
Zak and the crew check in for a night of terror at an infamous Tucson, Arizona, hotel plagued by poltergeist activity and spirit possession. Could a brush with one of America's most violent gangsters be responsible for the darkness that inhabits the building?
278	4	"Belmont Ghost Town"	Belmont, Nevada, US	June 12, 2024	28.4
Zak and the crew trek through the Nevada desert to locate a former Wild West town haunted by a grave injustice. The guys are shaken when they discover that the Manson family camped out in the courthouse of the crumbling town.

=== Season 29 (2025) ===
No. overall	No. in season	Title	Location(s)	Original release date	Prod. code
279	1	"The Houdini Seance"	San Jose, California, US	April 23, 2025	29.1
On the 100th anniversary of Harry Houdini's midnight visit to the fabled Winchester Mystery House, Zak and a team of paranormal experts attempt to summon the legendary magician's spirit. Will escaping death’s grip be Houdini's greatest trick?
280	2	"Glen Tavern Tragedy"	Santa Paula, California, US	April 30, 2025	29.2
Zak and the crew return to the Glen Tavern Inn in Santa Paula, California, to help its staff find closure after the tragic loss of a beloved local medium. Jonathan Davis from the band Korn and paranormal investigator Gary Galka assist as the team digs deeper into the dark mysteries of the former gambling house.
281	3	"Abandoned at Whiskey Pete's"	Primm, Nevada, US	May 7, 2025	29.3
Zak and the crew find themselves in an eerie Nevada desert town to investigate a recently shuttered casino haunted by the spirit of a notorious bootlegger. The air is thick with tension as the team and comedian Matt Rife confront the dark energy that lurks around every corner of the abandoned building.
282	4	"Mystery of Rispin Mansion"	Capitola, California, US	May 14, 2025	29.4
Zak and the crew gain unprecedented access to the cursed Rispin Mansion in Capitola, California. Sealed shut after a violent paranormal event in 2012, the abandoned home has become a vault of concentrated evil, waiting for an opportunity to explode.
283	5	"Living Dead on La Brea"	Hollywood, California, US	May 21, 2025	29.5
Zak investigates a former girls' school in Hollywood, California, after a gardener discovers bones in a shallow grave. Could the remains be connected to sightings of a ghostly girl in white and recent rifts among the living? Or is something more malevolent at play.

=== Season 30 (2025) ===
No. overall	No. in season	Title	Location(s)	Original release date	Prod. code
284	1	"Hollydale Asylum of Hell"	Downey, California, US	October 22, 2025	30.1
Zak and the crew uncover evidence of disturbing satanic rituals when they explore an abandoned medical complex in Downey, California, that once housed dangerously deranged patients.: Note: This investigation was cut short, when Aaron Goodwin received a phone call from the police, where he learned that his then-wife was arrested for conspiracy to murder.
285	2	"Hospital of the Damned"	Pasadena, California, US	October 29, 2025	30.2
Zak and the crew gain access to a shuttered Pasadena, California, hospital that has become a hotbed for devil worship. Zak suspects the evil originated with a heinous murder nearly 25 years ago.
286	3	"Darkness of Belmont Park"	San Diego, California, US	November 5, 2025	30.3
Zak and his crew investigate phantom footsteps, laughter and spectral figures at a San Diego amusement park. They discover a dark cloud hangs over the beloved establishment, which has entertained millions.
287	4	"Rage on the River"	Reno, Nevada, US	November 12, 2025	30.4
In Reno, NV, Zak helps a couple consumed by overwhelming darkness while renovating the abandoned River Inn, causing them to sleep in an RV. The crew suspects nearby hot springs are connected to the unnerving activity and the property's strange history.
288	5	"Gold Town Terror"	Jamestown, California, US	November 19, 2025	30.5
The crew investigates reports of demonic possession in Jamestown, California. Known as the gateway to the Gold Rush, claim jumpers, bandits, gamblers and bootleggers stained the town with blood and darkness, attracting demons from hell that never left.
289	6	"Doll of Fire"	Las Vegas, Nevada, US	December 3, 2025	30.6
The team helps a family that has been driven from their home by a malicious entity. Their misfortunes begin when they take in a doll from a hoarder's home. Zak fears that whatever inhabits the doll is responsible for a mysterious fire.
290	7	"Manor of Malice"	Los Angeles, California, US	December 10, 2025	30.7
Zak and the crew are summoned to a Los Angeles mansion where recent restoration efforts have awakened a sinister presence. With each step, the team risks falling prey to a dark attachment that threatens to follow them beyond the historic home's walls.
291	8	"Condemned in Calico"	Calico, California, US	December 17, 2025	30.8
Zak and the crew roll into a Wild West town to confront a posse of volatile spirits that are tormenting the living. The many deaths from this desert outpost's lawless past has infused the very rocks with a dark, powerful energy that cannot be contained.
292	9	"Midnight at the Museum"	Las Vegas, Nevada, US	December 24, 2025	30.9
Unsettling paranormal events near an exhibit of notorious serial killer Samuel Little prompt Zak to investigate his own Haunted Museum in Las Vegas. Are the events connected to Little's recently acquired remains, and his unsolved murders?
293	10	"Pioche Hospital of Hell"	Pioche, Nevada, US	December 31, 2025	30.10
The crew investigates two abandoned buildings in Pioche, Nevada, a town with a murderous past during its 1800s mining heyday. There are reports of disturbing activity in Pioche Hospital and sightings of a demonic creature in the Pioche Consolidated Mill.

=== Season 31 (2026) ===
No. overall	No. in season	Title	Location(s)	Original release date	Prod. code
294	1	"Factory of Fear"	Las Vegas, Nevada, US	September 30, 2026	31.1
Zak and the crew investigate strange goings-on inside a sprawling Las Vegas warehouse. Now operating as a horror-themed escape room, the site's sinister mob history has left behind a foreboding aura of violence and fear.
295	2	"Possession in Pilot Rock"	Pilot Rock, Oregon, US	October 7, 2026	31.2
Zak and the crew are called to help a man confront demonic forces in his rural Oregon home. They suspect a strong residual energy from the property's past has unleashed a dark, manipulative and potentially fatal presence upon the land.
296	3	"Mansion of Unholiness"	Redlands, California, US	October 14, 2026	31.3
Zak and the crew gain access to a palatial California estate where spectral nuns roam its halls and a dark, oppressive energy terrorizes the staff; the team quickly discovers this is a haunting unlike any other they've encountered.
297	4	"Gold Canyon Curse"	Nelson, Nevada, US	October 21, 2026	31.4
The crew investigates an abandoned Nevada mining town where visitors are being attacked by unseen forces; the settlement's history of violence has created a paranormal cauldron filled to the brim with angry spirits ready to lash out at a moment's notice.
298	5	"Mountain Meadows Massacre"	Cedar City, Utah, US	October 28, 2026	31.5
Zak and the crew head to Utah to visit the site of an infamous frontier massacre. Is the centuries-old shame from the senseless slaughter of innocent men, women and children fueling a malicious entity beneath a nearby town?
299	6	"Goumond House of Grim"	Las Vegas, Nevada, US	November 4, 2026	31.6
Zak and the crew take an unsettling stroll along a street lined with homes from Nevada's dark, violent past. The team quickly learns that when these houses were moved, the spirits attached to them came along and now their presence is even stronger.

== Specials ==
Title	Location	Original release date
"Ghost Adventures Documentary Film"	Virginia City, Nevada, US; Goldfield, Nevada, US	July 25, 2007 (Sci Fi); October 17, 2008 (Travel Channel)
Originally aired on Sci Fi in 2007, the Ghost Adventures Crew consisting of Zak Bagans, Nick Groff, and Aaron Goodwin travel to Virginia City, Nevada, to conduct an investigation of the Silver Queen Hotel, the Old Washoe Club, the Virginia City Cemetery, and a cabin near the Yellow Jacket Mine. Later, Zak and Nick investigate the Goldfield Hotel in Goldfield, Nevada. In Virginia City, the Crew capture a misty, arm-like figure knocking on the door leading to room 11 at the Silver Queen Hotel, and a full bodied apparition crossing an abandoned ballroom at the Old Washoe Club. In Goldfield, NV. at the abandoned Goldfield Hotel, Zak and Nick captured a shadowy apparition at the end of a long stretch of hallway, and a poltergeist that made a brick take flight in the basement.
"Ghost Adventures Live: The Trans-Allegheny Lunatic Asylum"	Weston, West Virginia, US	October 30, 2009
Zak, Nick, and Aaron spend seven hours locked inside Weston, West Virginia's Trans-Allegheny Lunatic Asylum, a former psychiatric hospital claimed to be one of the country's most haunted locations.
"Ghost Adventures Live: Post Mortem – The Trans-Allegheny Lunatic Asylum"	Weston, West Virginia, US	November 6, 2009
This special features investigative highlights from the GAC's lockdown inside the Trans-Allegheny Lunatic Asylum.
"Ghost Adventures Live: The Cutdown – The Trans-Allegheny Lunatic Asylum"	Weston, West Virginia, US	January 15, 2010
The crew gets locked inside the Trans-Allegheny Lunatic Asylum in Weston, West Virginia, and goes behind-the-scenes of their most infamous lockdown yet.
"Poveglia Island Special"	Venice, Italy	January 22, 2010
This special is a re-edited, extended version of GAC's previous investigation on the small Italian island of Poveglia.
"Best Evidence"	Las Vegas, Nevada, US	September 10, 2010
From their headquarters in Las Vegas, Nevada, Zak, Nick, and Aaron present some of the best evidence captured in previous episodes.
"Scariest Moments"	Las Vegas, Nevada, US	September 10, 2010
The GAC discuss their scariest experiences throughout the seasons while investigating during their lockdowns.
"Valentine's Day Special"	Sudbury, Massachusetts, US	February 11, 2011
The crew checks themselves into a room in Longfellow's Wayside Inn where it is claimed the ghost of Jerusha Howe is to be waiting for her lover to return from across the sea.
"Horror Hotels & Deadliest Hospitals"	Las Vegas, Nevada, US	February 24, 2012
While at Zak's house in his "dungeon" room, the Ghost Adventures Crew recall some of their spookiest encounters during their season 5 lockdowns in various haunted hotels and hospitals in their travels across the country. "Horror Hotels" includes the Stanley Hotel, Mizpah Hotel, Goldfield Hotel, the Cosmopolitan Hotel in San Diego, Jerome Grand Hotel, and the Silver Queen Hotel. "Deadliest Hospitals" includes St. Mary's Art Center, Ashmore Estates, and Letchworth Village.
"Wickedest Women, Houses of Terror & Bloodiest Battlefields"	Various Locations	March 2, 2012
Zak, Nick, and Aaron remember their most terrifying ghostly encounters with female entities, haunted houses, and battlefields they encountered all during their Season 5 lockdowns. "Wickedest Women" includes Lizzie Borden of the Lizzie Borden House, Bridget Bishop of The Witch House, and Lavinia Fisher of Old Charleston Jail. "Houses of Terror" includes Villisca Axe Murder House, Winchester Mystery House, Loretta Lynn Plantation House, Maysville Slave House, Rocky Point Manor, and the Jennie Wade House. "Bloodiest Battlefields" includes Perryville Battlefield, Gettysburg Battlefield and Old Fort Erie.
"Hellfire Caves"	West Wycombe, Buckinghamshire, England, UK	July 13, 2012
The GAC travel to West Wycombe, thirty miles outside London, England, where they explore the infamous Hellfire Caves and seek to conjure up the spirits of 18th century royalty (Sir Francis Dashwood and Paul Whitehead) who are said to still dwell there by performing an ancient and secret pagan ritual with special guest "Lady Snake" who previously appeared in the Ancient Ram Inn episode.
"Fort Horsted"	Gillingham, Kent, England, UK	July 20, 2012
The guys are in Gillingham, Kent, England, just southeast of London, hunkering down inside Fort Horsted, an old World War II fort built on ancient Anglo-Saxon land. Then the guys recruit locals to conduct a séance to provoke the demonic spirits that terrify visitors in what they call the "Demon Area" of the tunnel at the fort.
"Dead Men Walking"	Various Locations	November 2, 2012
The GAC showcase the most disturbing prisons and detention centers in the country. With a history of hangings, murders, electrocutions and suicides, these facilities have turned into spiritual battlegrounds. Locations featured are Moundsville Penitentiary in Moundsville, West Virginia; Idaho State Penitentiary in Boise, Idaho; Preston Castle in Ione, California; Eastern State Penitentiary in Philadelphia, Pennsylvania; Ohio State Reformatory in Mansfield, Ohio; Old Charleston Jail in Charleston, South Carolina; and Central Unit Prison in Sugar Land, Texas.
"Death By Wild West"	Various Locations	November 30, 2012
Zak, Nick, and Aaron recap their previous investigations of haunted frontier and ghost towns in Arizona, California, and Nevada that are in existence since the days of the American Wild West. Locations featured are the Birdcage Theater in Tombstone, Arizona, and the Stonehouse Brewery in Nevada City, California.
"Clinically Dead"	Various Locations	December 14, 2012
The crew recall their most frightening investigations of paranormal activity at various hospitals, sanitariums and asylums where violent deaths, mistreatment and abuse took place. Locations featured are Pennhurst State School in Spring City, Pennsylvania, Yorktown Memorial Hospital in Yorktown, Texas; Ashmore Estates in Ashmore, Illinois; Northern New Jersey Asylum in Cedar Grove, New Jersey; Waverly Hills Sanatorium in Louisville, Kentucky; Linda Vista Community Hospital in Los Angeles, California; Letchworth Village in Haverstraw, New York; Rolling Hills Asylum in East Bethany, New York; and Tooele Hospital in Tooele, Utah.
"Killer Nightlife"	Various Locations	December 21, 2012
The guys remember the spirits in their previous lockdowns at the most haunted bars, restaurants, and nightclubs. Locations featured are Bobby Mackey's Music World in Wilder, Kentucky; Old Washoe Club in Virginia City, Nevada; Kell's Irish Pub in Seattle, Washington; Moon River Brewing Company in Savannah, Georgia; Lyceum Restaurant in Salem, Massachusetts; and Excalibur Nightclub in Chicago, Illinois.
"Do Not Disturb"	Various Locations	December 28, 2012
Zak, Nick, and Aaron recap all the ghostly guest during their lockdowns at various haunted hotels where murders, shootings and suicides had occurred. Locations featured are Stanley Hotel in Estes Park, Colorado; Longfellow's Wayside Inn in Sudbury, Massachusetts; Goldfield Hotel in Goldfield, Nevada; Amargosa Opera House in Death Valley Junction, California; Copper Queen Hotel and Oliver House in Bisbee, Arizona; The Palmer House (Sauk Centre) in Sauk Centre, Minnesota; Mizpah Hotel in Tonopah, Nevada; and Pico House in Los Angeles, California.
"Home Sweet Hell"	Various Locations	January 4, 2013
The Ghost Adventures Crew recall all of their ghost hunts that have taken place in homes that are said to be haunted. Locations feature are the Rose Hall Plantation and the Cinnamon Hill Plantation House, former home of Johnny Cash, both in Montego Bay, Saint James Parish, Jamaica; the Magnolia Lane Plantation in Natchitoches, Louisiana; the Ancient Ram Inn in Wotton-under-Edge, Gloucestershire, England; Prospect Place in Trinway, Ohio; Riddle House in Palm Beach, Florida; Wolfe Manor in Clovis, California; Winchester Mystery House in San Jose, California; and the Houghton Mansion in North Adams, Massachusetts.
"Passport to Hell"	Various Locations	January 25, 2013
The guys remember all their international lockdowns in the world's most sinister places. Locations featured are the Edinburgh Vaults in Edinburgh, Scotland; Rose Hall Great House in Montego Bay, Jamaica; Fort Horsted in Gillingham, England; Ancient Ram Inn in Gloucestershire, England; Poveglia Island in Venice, Italy; the Hellfire Caves in West Wycombe, England; and Fort Erie in Ontario, Canada.
"Dungeons & Demons"	Various Locations	February 1, 2013
Zak, Nick, and Aaron recap their underground lockdowns during their investigations in dungeons and tunnels. Locations featured are: Hellfire Caves in West Wycombe, England; Sacramento Tunnels in Sacramento, California; Pennhurst State School in Spring City, Pennsylvania; Shanghai Tunnels in Portland, Oregon; Gettysburg Orphanage (Soldier's National Museum) and Jennie Wade House in Gettysburg, Pennsylvania; Hill View Manor in New Castle, Pennsylvania; and Rolling Hills Asylum in East Bethany, New York.
"Bewitched & Bothered"	Various Locations	February 8, 2013
GAC recall their most intense encounters and life-threatening moments with ghosts and spirits of all time during their lockdowns. Locations featured are the Poveglia Island in Venice, Italy; Maysville Slave House in Maysville, Kentucky; Preston Castle in Ione, California; Moon River Brewing Company in Savannah, Georgia; Magnolia Lane Plantation in Natchitoches, Louisiana; Fort Horsted in Gillingham, Kent, England and the Central Unit Prison in Sugar Land, Texas.
"Obsessions & Possessions"	Various Locations	February 15, 2013
Zak, Nick and Aaron remember their past lockdowns that focus on ghosts and spirits with strong attachments to the people or places they left behind. Locations include the Ohio State Reformatory in Mansfield, Ohio, the Linda Vista Community Hospital in Los Angeles, California, the Villisca Axe Murder House in Villisca, Iowa, Letchworth Village in Haverstraw, New York, the Galka Family Home in Granby, Connecticut, Ashmore Estates in Ashmore, Illinois, and the West Virginia State Penitentiary in Moundsville, West Virginia
"Armies of Darkness"	Various Locations	March 8, 2013
GAC examine war-torn locations filled with the echoes of America's violent history. There is a unique form of shock, misery and terror attached to battlefields. When the fight is over, the suffering remains in the manifestation of spirits, some of whom are bold enough to summon the guys even closer. Locations include Remington Arms Factory in Bridgeport, Connecticut, Sloss Furnace in Birmingham, Alabama, Hales Bar Marina and Dam in Haletown, Tennessee, Fort Chaffee in Fort Smith, Arkansas, USS Hornet in Alameda, California, Execution Rocks Lighthouse in New Rochelle, New York, Castillo de San Marcos in St. Augustine, Florida, and Rocky Point Manor in Harrodsburg, Kentucky, along with Perryville Battlefield in Perryville, Kentucky.
"First Timers"	Various Locations	March 15, 2013
Over the years, Zak, Nick and Aaron have invited many guests to participate in some of their most memorable investigations. People and places include Mötley Crüe's Vince Neil and Bruce Westcott, Frank Sinatra's former pianist at the Riviera Hotel and Casino in Las Vegas, Nevada, The Hollywood Ghost Hunters, consisting of Kane Hodder, R.A. Mihailoff, and Rick McCallum at the Pico House in Los Angeles, California, Liz Nowicki at the Lizzie Borden House in Fall River, Massachusetts, Brendan Schaub at the Peabody-Whitehead Mansion in Denver, Colorado, Chad Lindberg at the Linda Vista Community Hospital in Los Angeles, California, Roy Marshall at the Villisca Axe Murder House in Villisca, Iowa, Christian Day at the Witch House in Salem, Massachusetts, Dakota and Rob Laden, the winners of the Ghost Adventures Crew Mashup Challenge, at the Old Charleston Jail in Charleston, South Carolina, Joe Tasso, Wally Luna, and Christy Silva at Bonnie Springs Ranch in Blue Diamond, Nevada.
"Up Close and Personal"	Various Locations	September 27, 2013
Zak, Nick and Aaron look back at the series one hundred most memorable moments and investigations in celebration of the upcoming 100th episode. Also fans vote on their favorite funniest and scariest moments to see which moments are the winners of each episode.
"Halloween Special: Transylvania"	Târgoviște, Dâmbovița, Romania; Cluj-Napoca, Cluj, Romania; Hunedoara, Hunedoara, Romania	October 31, 2013
In a two-hour Halloween special, GAC jet off to the mysterious country of Romania to their dream destination to Transylvania to follow in the footsteps of Vlad Tepes a.k.a. Dracula. Whilst in the Eastern European country, they split up and investigate three different locations. Nick and Aaron visit the ruins of Targoviste Castle where Vlad the Impaler lived up to his nickname impaling 200,000 of his enemies around the castle. Meanwhile, Zak travels to the notorious Hoia-Baciu Forest known for its extraterrestrial/supernatural/paranormal manifestations in which he and audio tech Billy journey deeper into the "Devil's Heart", a circular clearing where no trees grow and light anomalies appear. Lastly, the guys meet up for their lockdown in Hunedoara Castle, known as Dracula's Castle where he was imprisoned.
"Netherworld: Paris Catacombs"	Paris, Ile-de-France, France	April 5, 2014
Zak heads to Paris, where he learns from locals that the dead are buried just beneath the streets. To be exact, 65 feet below in a massive maze of tunnels. His mission is to learn everything he can about the culture, the history, and the mysteries of Paris' Catacombs, especially if it relates to the afterlife.
"Halloween Special: Ireland's Celtic Demons"	Montpelier Hill, County Dublin, Ireland; Duncannon, County Wexford, Ireland; Clareen, County Offaly, Ireland	October 31, 2014
GAC travel to the mystical country of Ireland to investigate locations steeped with demonic activity, while also covering the origins of Halloween. To start their Irish adventure, they begin with a trip to the cave at Rathcroghan; the birthplace of Samhain. Nick and Billy investigate the Leap Castle north of Roscrea in Clareen, Ireland's most haunted castle, to look for the "elemental", Zak, Aaron, and Jay investigate the Hell-Fire Club Lodge, on Montpelier Hill. They learn about the stories of Satan visiting the premises and the mythological creatures of Massy Woods, including a banshee. Next, they hear the legend of the Black Cat of Killakee that haunts the Stewards House which sits at the bottom of the hill. The guys regroup to for their journey south in County Wexford for their lockdown in Loftus Hall, Ireland's most haunted house, outside of Duncannon, where the devil is believed to have stayed the night.
"Halloween Special: Deadwood – City of Ghosts"	Deadwood, South Dakota, US	October 31, 2015
GAC travel to the legendary Wild West town of Deadwood, in South Dakota's Black Hills to investigate its most haunted locations, where the spirits of cowboys and gunslingers still roam. For the first day of their lockdown, Zak, Aaron, and Billy investigate the Bullock Hotel, where the former owner Seth Bullock is claimed to haunt, while Jay monitors the activity at the Wild Bill's Trading Post, the original site of Saloon No. 10, where Wild Bill Hickok was shot dead by Jack McCall after drawing the Dead Man's Hand. For the second day of their lockdown, Zak and Aaron investigate the Fairmont Hotel, a former brothel, where Jack McCall is believed to haunt after he stayed in the hotel prior to his murder of Wild Bill Hickok, and Billy, Jay, and Bill Chappell investigate the Adams House, where it is believed to be haunted by the Adams family after a string of unexpected deaths in the family.
"Halloween Special: Route 666"	El Paso, Texas, US; Denton, Texas, US	October 29, 2016
GAC travel across Texas on their own personal Route 666 to investigate three extremely demonic locations. First, they investigate the Concordia Cemetery and the De Soto Hotel in El Paso, both renown for satanic worship on the properties. Then they head to Denton to investigate the Old Alton Bridge, or Goatman's Bridge, who supposedly lurks in the woods around the location, to hunt for the demon that has attacked three women.
"Hauntings of Vicksburg: McRaven Mansion"	Vicksburg, Mississippi, US	October 7, 2017
GAC are called upon by the mayor of Vicksburg, Mississippi, one of the most haunted towns in America, to investigate the Siege of Vicksburg and its lasting impact on the city. Their first stop is McRaven Mansion, which is widely considered to be the most haunted building in the South.
"Hauntings of Vicksburg: Demons and Dolls"	Vicksburg, Mississippi, US	October 7, 2017
GAC continue their exploration of Vicksburg, Mississippi, by investigating a demonic presence at a hair salon that was hit by cannon fire during the Civil War. They also investigate an antique doll museum said to contain dolls that come alive.
"Hauntings of Vicksburg: Spirits Under Siege"	Vicksburg, Mississippi, US	October 14, 2017
GAC uncover dangerous paranormal activity at two abandoned locations in Civil War-scarred Vicksburg, Mississippi. First, a former Elks Lodge where an unsolved murder occurred in 2005. Then, the Kuhn Memorial State Hospital, an old hospital with a history of disease and death from the smallpox outbreak.
"Hauntings of Vicksburg: Champion Hill Battlefield"	Bolton, Mississippi, US	October 21, 2017
GAC finish their Civil War investigation in Vicksburg, Mississippi with the Battle of Champion Hill. Zak digs deep into the historic soil, which was the site of 6,000 casualties, and follows the trail of evil extending into the surrounding forest.
"Halloween Special: Museum of Madness (Part 1)"	Las Vegas, Nevada, US	October 28, 2017
Zak Bagans has opened a Haunted Museum in downtown Las Vegas, housing his collection of haunted and cursed objects. With several new items on hand, Bagans calls on experts from previous "Ghost Adventures" investigations to tap into the energies within each object.
"Halloween Special: Annabelle's Curse (Part 2)"	Las Vegas, Nevada, US	October 28, 2017
In the second half of the two-part special, Bagans invites three lucky fans to the museum to further investigate the dark entities. Then, Bagans ups the fear factor with the arrival of the famously haunted doll, Annabelle, who comes with very strict rules: no physical handling, no provoking and a quart of holy water must be on standby in case of possession.
"Graveyard of the Pacific: Astoria Underground"	Astoria, Oregon, US	October 6, 2018
GAC begin their investigation of the Graveyard of the Pacific in Astoria, Oregon, where they explore the port city's infamous Underground, a network of tunnels that were used for Shanghaiing men to use for ship crews. They also uncover a series of misfortunes connected the works of H. P. Lovecraft.
"Graveyard of the Pacific: Norblad Hostel"	Astoria, Oregon, US	October 13, 2018
GAC continue their investigation of the Graveyard of the Pacific in Astoria, Oregon, where they encounter a very dangerous and very unholy presence in the basement of the recently renovated Norblad Hostel, a historic hotel which was a former drug den and hostel called the Hideaway Inn.
"Graveyard of the Pacific: Commander's House"	Warrenton, Oregon, US	October 20, 2018
GAC continue their investigation of the Graveyard of the Pacific at the Commander's House at Fort Stevens, a former military installation near Astoria, Oregon, that's haunted by a tragic past and home to an aggressive entity believed to be a male shadow figure who may be involved with a soldier who was beaten to death while on duty in the 1860s.
"Graveyard of the Pacific: Cape Disappointment"	Ilwaco, Washington, US	October 27, 2018
GAC conclude their investigation of the Graveyard of the Pacific with a visit to Washington State, where they explore the North Head Light, a lighthouse that bore witness to a suspicious suicide by the first keeper's wife Mary and some of the most tragic shipwrecks on the Pacific Coast.
"Halloween Special: The Haunted Museum LIVE"	Las Vegas, Nevada, US	October 31, 2018
Zak and the crew are live from The Haunted Museum in Las Vegas, Nevada, for a 4-hour special investigation.
"Curse of the River Bend: McPike Mansion"	Alton, Illinois, US	January 5, 2019
The crew travels to Alton, Illinois, a town considered by many to be one of the most haunted places in America, to investigate the Victorian McPike Mansion that has a rich history and reports of dangerous paranormal activity.
"Curse of the River Bend: Mineral Springs Hotel"	Alton, Illinois, US	January 12, 2019
GAC concludes their two-part investigation of Alton, Illinois, at the Mineral Springs Hotel. The 1914 structure has been witness to multiple deaths, and Zak believes a demonic entity is keeping these lost souls trapped inside the building.
"Serial Killer Spirits: H. H. Holmes Murder House"	Irvington, Indiana, US	October 5, 2019
Zak Bagans and the "Ghost Adventures" crew investigate the Irvington, Indiana, home where H. H. Holmes, America's first serial killer, killed a nine-year-old boy. The current owner believes dark and sinister forces have overtaken the property, leaving her vulnerable to possession.
"Serial Killer Spirits: John Gacy Prison"	Joliet, Illinois, US	October 12, 2019
Zak Bagans and the crew head to Illinois in search of the spirit of infamous serial killer John Wayne Gacy. Their investigation leads them to the Old Joliet Prison, where they hope to come face-to-face with the 'Killer Clown' himself.
"Serial Killer Spirits: Axe Killer Jail"	Council Bluffs, Iowa, US	October 19, 2019
Zak Bagans and the team travel to Council Bluffs, Iowa, to investigate the Pottawattamie County Jail, known as 'Squirrel Cage Jail' that once held the 'Tacoma Axe-Killer', Jake Bird, a prolific serial killer who may have killed as many as 46 people, and was said to have placed a deadly curse on the authorities who convicted him.
"Serial Killer Spirits: Ted Bundy Ritual House"	Bountiful, Utah, US	October 26, 2019
Zak Bagans and the team investigate an abandoned house in Bountiful, Utah, where locals claim notorious serial killer Ted Bundy murdered one of his victims. Overloaded with satanic rituals and violence, the home is drenched in a dark, sinister energy.
"Halloween Special: Curse of the Harrisville Farmhouse"	Harrisville, Rhode Island, US	October 31, 2019
Zak and the team investigate the home of the Perron family, who are portrayed in the film The Conjuring. The Harrisville home is one of the most terrifying places in the world and has also been made famous by the work of Ed and Lorraine Warren who were called in to help by the Perron family. The crew is ready to confront the dangerous consequences of investigating the infamous house.
"Horror at Joe Exotic Zoo"	Wynnewood, Oklahoma, US	October 29, 2020
GAC travel to the Greater Wynnewood Exotic Animal Park in Wynwood, Oklahoma to investigate claims of paranormal activity of tortured souls believed to be haunting the zoo that was recently tainted by tragedy and the criminal dealings of its former infamous owner, Joe Exotic of Tiger King.
"Ghost Adventures: Cecil Hotel"	Los Angeles, California, US	January 4, 2021 (Discovery+)
GAC travel to Los Angeles, California to investigate the Stay on Main Hotel (formerly known as the Cecil Hotel), whose past has been beset by multiple suicides, murders, devil worshipping and serial killers. The hotel is best-known for the mysterious death of Elisa Lam, whose body was found in the hotel's water tower.
"Ghost Adventures: Goldfield Hotel"	Goldfield, Nevada, US	October 1, 2021 (Discovery+)
GAC head back to Goldfield, Nevada, to settle—once and for all—a mysterious evil feud that's been cast over the town. In a highly personal and emotionally charged investigation, Zak Bagans, Aaron Goodwin, Billy Tolley and Jay Wasley revisit the haunted town where their journey began... and head back inside the infamous Goldfield Hotel, a landmark with a bloodied past. New frightening paranormal incidents call the GAC back in their final attempt to unmask a vengeful presence that only grows stronger—and more menacing—by the day.
"Ghost Adventures: Devil's Den"	Downey, California, US	September 29, 2022 (Discovery+)
The crew are in Downey, California, to investigate the shuttered Los Padrinos Juvenile Detention Center, given the ominous designation of the "Devil's Den" by both guards and inmates. In this terrifying two-hour special, the crew go behind the barbed wire to find out if the evil inside is not the real-life horrors of detention, but the devil itself.
"Ghost Adventures: Lake of Death"	Clark County, Nevada, US	May 31, 2023 (Discovery Channel/Discovery+)
Zak and the crew comb the receding shores of Nevada's legendary Lake Mead for clues about its deadly past. As the reservoir rapidly dries out, dark secrets rise to the surface. Is a curse behind the tortured energy emanating from the brilliant blue waters? Zak and the GAC investigate 4 areas alongside the receding shores; the old railroad tunnels on the south side of the lake, where people witness shapeshifting entities, the Government Wash and Gypsum Wash, two areas in the northwest of the lake where bodies have been discovered from the receding waters, and Devil's Cove, an extremely remote location at the far eastern end of the lake where a transient was allegedly doing rituals, and was shot to death after allegedly becoming possessed by the devil trying to murder two people fishing nearby.
"Ghost Adventures: Devil Island"	Tiburon, California, US	October 4, 2023 (Discovery Channel/Discovery+)
Chaos follows Zak and the crew as they cross the San Francisco Bay to investigate the deceptively named Angel Island. Once home to an immigration station with a notorious history of torture and despair, the guys face residual anger and ecstasy emanating from a demonic darkness.
"Ghost Adventures: Skinwalker Invasion"	Torrey, Utah, US	May 15, 2024 (Discovery Channel/Discovery+)
Zak and the crew tread upon sacred ground when they investigate reports of skinwalker sightings in the remote town of Torrey, Utah. Was the invasion triggered by the desecration of Native American artifacts, or has a past investigation come back to haunt the team? Zak and the crew also investigate the Chuckwagon Inn and General Store and find themselves caught in a battle between an ancient energy and the dark spirits that haunt the building.
"Ghost Adventures: Poltergeist House Curse"	Simi Valley, California, US	April 16, 2025 (Discovery Channel/Discovery+)
Zak and the crew launch an unprecedented investigation at one of horror's most iconic locations. Rumors of a deadly curse have haunted a Simi Valley, California, home since the movie Poltergeist was filmed there in 1981. Did real-life events converge with the film's fictional storyline to unlock a lethal, ancient darkness?
"Ghost Adventures: Mountain of Madness"	Casper, Wyoming, US	October 15, 2025 (Discovery Channel/Discovery+)
In part 1, Zak and the crew travel to Casper, Wyoming, to investigate local reports of UFO sightings, alien abductions and hauntings near an ominous mountain and abandoned military base. Will a massive storm prevent the team from unraveling the mystery? In part 2, Zak and his crew push higher atop Casper Mountain into the world of storied witches. Their investigation leads to a haunted forest where annual summer solstice rituals may have opened a gateway to another dimension.
"Ghost Adventures: Buried Souls of Pendleton"	Pendleton, Oregon, US	November 26, 2025 (Discovery Channel/Discovery+)
In part 1, Zak and the crew arrive in historic Pendleton, Oregon, to investigate dark hauntings in its storied subterranean tunnels. Has a history of death, misery and hatred fed the negative energy snaking its way beneath this seemingly peaceful town? In part 2, Zak and the crew continue their terrifying investigation of historic Pendleton, Oregon. A tip from a local sends the team to an unexplored section of the town's mysterious tunnel system that may bring more shameful secrets - and a curse - to light.
