= Yorktown Memorial Hospital =

Former hospital in Texas, United States

Coordinates: 28°58′43.37″N 97°30′49.56″W

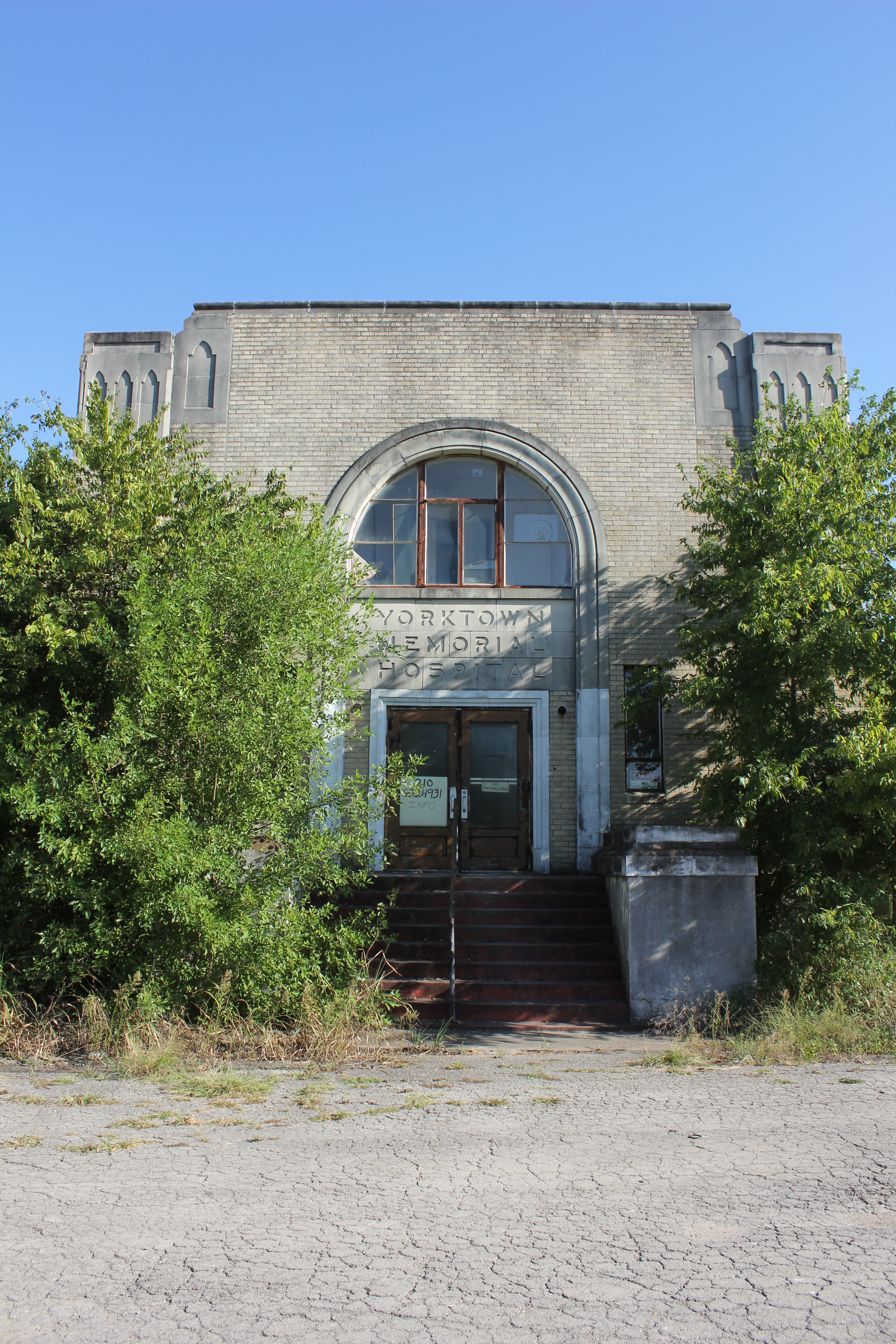
Yorktown Memorial Hospital in 2015

Yorktown Memorial Hospital is a former hospital in Yorktown, Texas, United States. The extant abandoned hospital was later opened to tour groups.

== History ==
Yorktown Memorial Hospital opened in 1951, at a cost of approximately $500,000. It was operated by the Felician Sisters, an order of Catholic nuns. The 30,000-square-foot (2,800 m^{2}) hospital had administration offices, and two two-story wings containing hospital rooms, a chapel, and a basement.

The hospital closed in 1986, and then reopened as a drug and alcohol rehabilitation center, which closed in the 1990s.

A private owner purchased the property, and offered tours. The building was featured on the television show Ghost Adventures. In 2018, the city of Yorktown cited the owner with building code violations, and tours were discontinued.
