= Old Washoe Club =

- U.S. Historic district – Contributing property
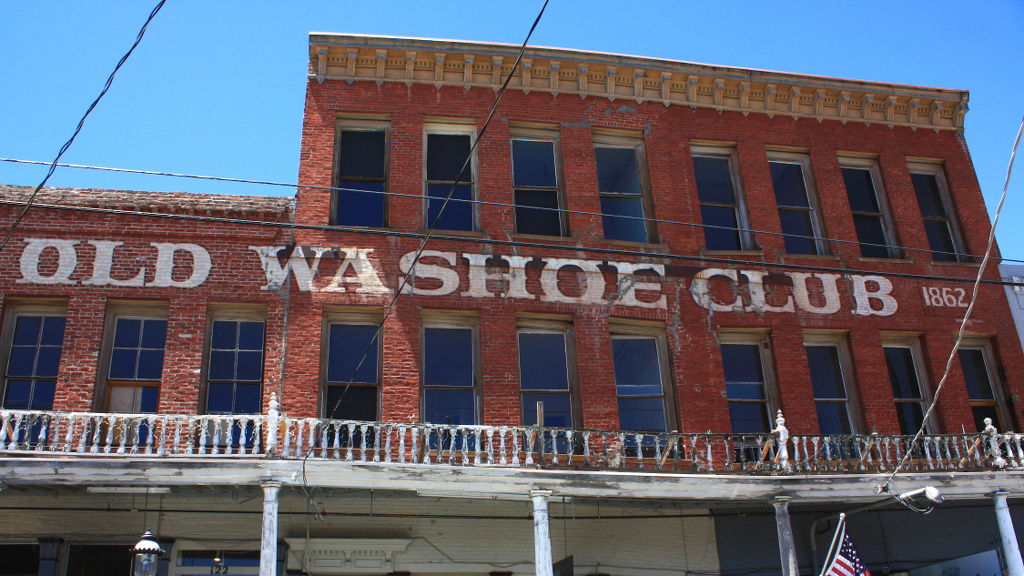
- Upper façade

- Location within Nevada
- Location: 112 South C Street, Virginia City, Nevada
- Coordinates: 39°18′33″N 119°39′01″W
- Built: 1875
- Part of: Virginia City Historic District (ID66000458)
- Added to NRHP: October 15, 1966

The Old Washoe Club (also known as simply Washoe Club) is a three-story brick structure in Virginia City, Nevada, USA, located in the Virginia City Historic District. The first story is currently occupied by commercial properties while the upper stories are unoccupied at this time. The building is an un-reinforced masonry building and, as such, has several deficiencies relative to its ability to resist seismic events. The building can be accessed through the main entrance on C Street. The Washoe Club was featured on Ghost Hunters.
