= Zalud House =

Historic house in California, United States

- U.S. National Register of Historic Places
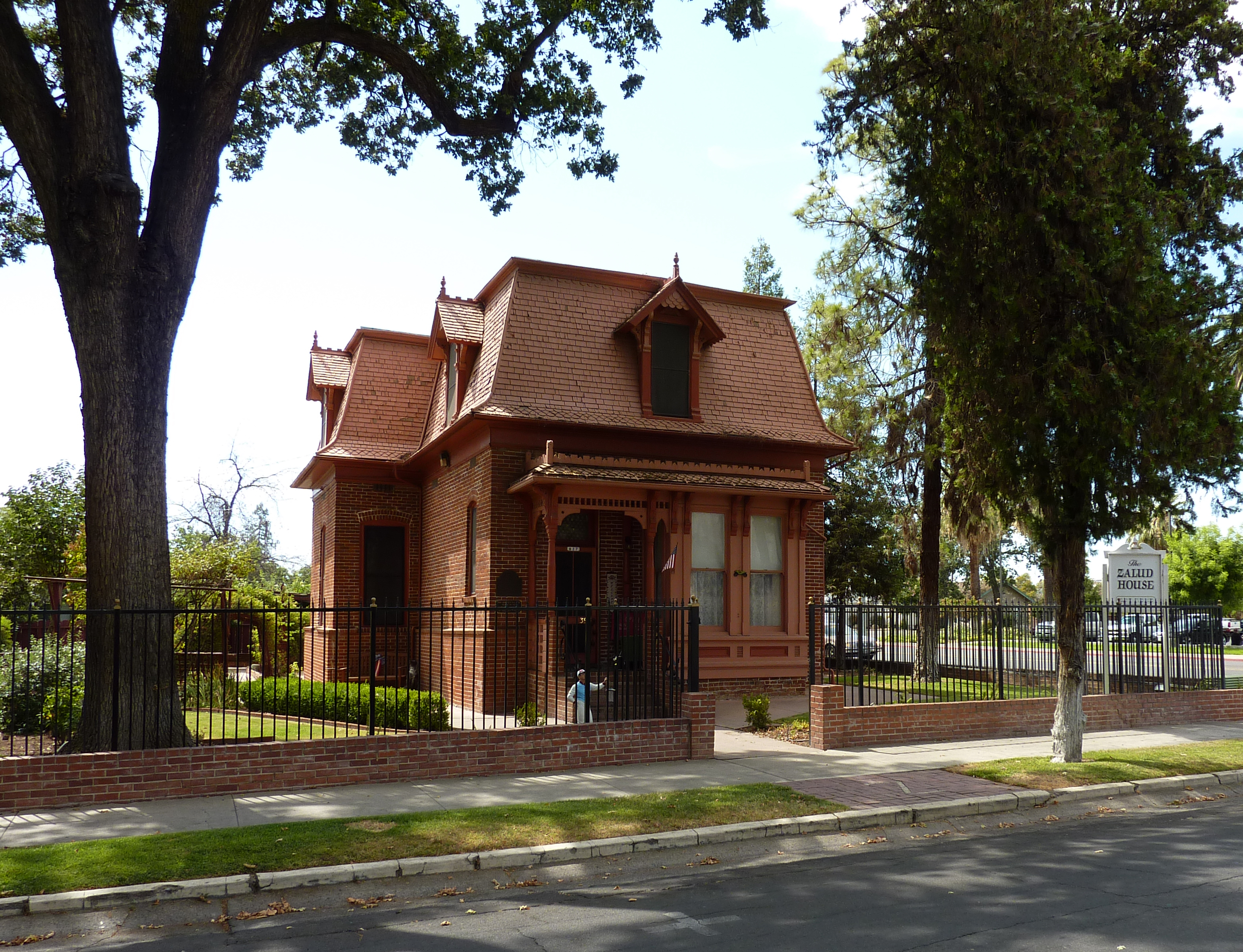

- Location within California Location within the United States
- Interactive map showing the location of Zalud House
- Location: 393 N. Hockett St., Porterville, California
- Coordinates: 36°4′21″N 119°0′56″W
- Area: 0.3 acres (0.12 ha)
- Built: 1891
- Architect: Templeton, Hugh; Templeton, John
- Architectural style: Second Empire
- NRHP reference No.: 86003681
- Added to NRHP: March 31, 1987

The Zalud House is a historic house located at 393 N. Hockett St. in Porterville, California.

== History ==
The house was built by John Zalud, a Porterville businessman, in 1891. Architects Hugh and John Templeton designed the building in the Second Empire style; the house is the only Second Empire home in Porterville. The design includes a mansard roof with decorated dormer windows, a front porch with wooden ornamentation, and tall double-hung sash windows on the front and sides. While the house was built in brick, a departure from the standard wood construction of Second Empire buildings, it uses wood extensively in its detailing. In 1977, the city of Porterville converted the house to a museum. The Zalud House was listed on the National Register of Historic Places on March 31, 1987.

== On television ==
On December 10, 2016, the Zalud House was the featured as a lockdown location on a season 13 episode of Ghost Adventures, where a 'cursed chair' in an upstairs bedroom caused visitors to have chest pains. In 1917, orange grower William Brookes (John Zalud's son-in-law) was murdered in this chair while sitting in the lobby of the former Pioneer Hotel. He was shot four times and killed by a married woman named Julia Howe, who objected to what he was saying about her after bragging he had an affair with her.
