= Ancient Ram Inn =

Former pub in England

Coordinates: 51°38′17″N 2°20′53″W

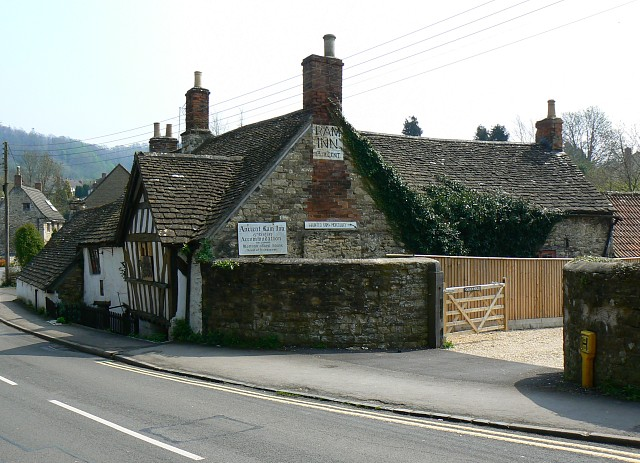
The Ram Inn

The Ancient Ram Inn is a Grade II* listed building and a former pub located in Wotton-under-Edge, a market town within the Stroud district of Gloucestershire, England. This inn was said to have also been owned by the local St. Mary's Church when first built. The late medieval building was remodelled in the mid to late 16th century.

It now operates as a guesthouse, and its owners advertise it as "the most haunted building in England" with around twenty ghosts said to haunt it. Owner Caroline Humphries has said the building "kind of evolved into an event location for paranormal activity" after her father converted it into a guesthouse in 1968.
