= Deadwood (TV series) =

American television series (2004–2006)

- Genre: Western; Serial drama; Period drama
- Created by: David Milch
- Showrunner: David Milch
- Starring: Timothy Olyphant; Ian McShane; Molly Parker; Jim Beaver; Brad Dourif; John Hawkes; Paula Malcomson; Leon Rippy; William Sanderson; Robin Weigert; W. Earl Brown; Dayton Callie; Keith Carradine; Powers Boothe; Kim Dickens; Anna Gunn; Jeffrey Jones; Sean Bridgers; Titus Welliver; Bree Seanna Wall; Josh Eriksson; Garret Dillahunt; Brent Sexton
- Theme music composer: David Schwartz
- Composers: Reinhold Heil; Johnny Klimek; David Schwartz; Michael Brook
- Country of origin: United States
- Original language: English
- No. of seasons: 3
- No. of episodes: 36 (list of episodes)

Production
- Executive producers: David Milch; Gregg Fienberg; Mark Tinker
- Running time: 48–60 minutes
- Production companies: Roscoe Productions; Red Board Productions; Paramount Network Television; Home Box Office

Original release
- Network: HBO
- Release: March 21, 2004 – August 27, 2006

Related
- Deadwood: The Movie (2019)

Deadwood is an American Western television series that aired on the premium cable network HBO from March 21, 2004, to August 27, 2006. The series is set in the 1870s in Deadwood, South Dakota, before and after the area's annexation by the Dakota Territory, and charts Deadwood's growth from camp to town. The show was created, produced, and largely written by David Milch. Deadwood features a large ensemble cast headed by Timothy Olyphant and Ian McShane, playing the real-life Deadwood residents Seth Bullock and Al Swearengen, respectively. Many other historical figures appear as characters, including George Crook, Wyatt Earp, E. B. Farnum, George Hearst, Wild Bill Hickok, Calamity Jane, Sol Star, A. W. Merrick, Jack McCall, and Charlie Utter. The plot lines involving these characters include historical truths as well as fictional elements. Milch used actual diaries and newspapers from 1870s Deadwood residents as reference points for characters, events, and the look and feel of the show.

Deadwood received critical acclaim, particularly for Milch's writing and McShane's performance, and is widely regarded as one of the greatest television shows of all time. It also won eight Emmy Awards (in 28 nominations) and one Golden Globe. TV Guide ranked it #8 on its 2013 list of 60 shows that were "Cancelled Too Soon", while the Writers Guild of America ranked it #32 on their list of the 101 Best Written TV Series. The show was produced by Red Board Productions and Roscoe Productions in association with HBO and Paramount Network Television.

After several years of discussion and pre-production, Deadwood: The Movie began filming in October 2018. The film is set ten years after the end of the third season and premiered on HBO on May 31, 2019.

== Cast ==
Main cast
Actor	Character	Based on	Profession
Timothy Olyphant	Seth Bullock	Seth Bullock	Sheriff/co-owner of Star & Bullock Hardware
Ian McShane	Al Swearengen	Al Swearengen	Owner of The Gem Saloon
Molly Parker	Alma Garret		Widow of claim seeker, later married to Ellsworth
Jim Beaver	Whitney Ellsworth		Prospector/husband to Alma Garret
Brad Dourif	Dr. Amos "Doc" Cochran	Composite of several Deadwood physicians, including Lyman F. Babcock and F.S. Howe	Physician
John Hawkes	Sol Star	Sol Star	Co-owner of Star & Bullock Hardware
Paula Malcomson	Trixie	Based on a number of "Tricksies" who were prostitutes at The Gem	Prostitute
Leon Rippy	Tom Nuttall	Billy Nuttall	Owner of Nuttall's #10 Saloon
William Sanderson	E. B. Farnum	E. B. Farnum	Owner of The Grand Central Hotel
Robin Weigert	Calamity Jane	Calamity Jane	Friend of Hickok/scout
W. Earl Brown	Dan Dority	Dan Doherty	Gem Saloon worker
Dayton Callie	Charlie Utter	Charlie Utter	Friend of Hickok/deputy to Sheriff Bullock
Keith Carradine	Wild Bill Hickok	Wild Bill Hickok	Famed pistoleer
Powers Boothe	Cy Tolliver	Tom Miller	Owner of The Bella Union
Kim Dickens	Joanie Stubbs	Loosely based on Dora DuFran	Former hostess of The Bella Union/owner of The Chez Amis
Anna Gunn	Martha Bullock	Martha Bullock	Wife of Seth, mother of William
Jeffrey Jones	A. W. Merrick	A. W. Merrick	Editor of The Deadwood Pioneer
Sean Bridgers	Johnny Burns	Johnny Burns	Gem Saloon worker
Titus Welliver	Silas Adams		Emissary of Magistrate Clagett turned crony of Al Swearengen
Bree Seanna Wall	Sofia Metz		Adopted daughter of Alma; sole survivor of an attack on her family
Josh Eriksson	William Bullock	Loosely based on Douglas Kislingbury	Stepson of Seth; biological son of Robert and Martha Bullock
Garret Dillahunt (Note: Garret Dillahunt portrays Jack McCall during season one and Francis Wolcott during season two)	Francis Wolcott	L. D. Kellogg	Geologist for George Hearst
Brent Sexton	Harry Manning	John J. Manning	Barman at Nuttall's #10 Saloon
Supporting cast
Actor	Character	Based on	Profession
Geri Jewell	Jewel Caulfield		Disabled cleaning woman at the Gem
Franklyn Ajaye	Samuel Fields	Samuel Fields	Self-proclaimed "Nigger General"
Keone Young	Mr. Wu	Wong Fee Lee	Leader of the Chinese population; owns a pig pen and laundry
Peter Jason	Con Stapleton	Con Stapleton	Worker for Cy Tolliver
Cleo King	Aunt Lou	Lucretia Marchbanks	Hearst's personal cook
Gerald McRaney	George Hearst	George Hearst	California businessman and prospector
Recurring cast
Actor	Character	Based on	Profession
Timothy Omundson	Brom Garret		Alma's husband and claim seeker
Garret Dillahunt	Jack McCall	Jack McCall	Murderer of Wild Bill Hickok
Ray McKinnon	Reverend Smith	Henry Weston Smith	Minister of Deadwood
Ricky Jay	Eddie Sawyer		Card shark employed at The Bella Union
Larry Cedar	Leon		Worker for Cy Tolliver
Zach Grenier	Andy Cramed	Andy Cramed	Gambler who brought smallpox to Deadwood, later minister
Ralph Richeson	Pete Richardson		Cook at the Grand Central
Alice Krige	Maddie		Madam of the Chez Amis
Sarah Paulson	Miss Isringhausen		Tutor to Sofia/Pinkerton agent
Monty "Hawkeye" Henson	Hawkeye		Assistant to Silas Adams
Stephen Tobolowsky	Commissioner Jarry	Hugh McCaffrey	Commissioner for Lawrence County, Dakota Territory
Pasha Lychnikoff	Blazanov		Operator of Deadwood's telegraph service
Richard Gant	Hostetler		Livery owner
Michael Harney	Steve Fields		Takes over livery stable when Hostetler leaves camp
Allan Graf	Captain Joe Turner		Enforcer for Hearst
Brian Cox	Jack Langrishe	Jack Langrishe	Stage promoter
Jennifer Lutheran	Jen		Gem prostitute and special friend of Johnny Burns
Guest cast
Actor	Character	Based on	Profession
Gale Harold	Wyatt Earp	Wyatt Earp	Legendary Western lawman
Austin Nichols	Morgan Earp	Morgan Earp	Legendary Western lawman
Omar Gooding	Odell		Son of Aunt Lou

== Production ==
The first book that the show's creator, David Milch, purchased as research for the series was Deadwood: The Golden Years by Watson Parker, a historian who specialized in the history of the Black Hills. Milch and his colleagues later bought many of Parker's books and papers as references for Deadwood.

=== Writing ===
==== Themes ====
Milch has pointed out repeatedly in interviews that the intent of the show was to study the way that civilization comes together from chaos by organizing itself around symbols (in Deadwood the main symbol is gold). Initially, he intended to study this within Roman civilization (the central symbol was to be the religious cross), but HBO's Rome series was already in development, and Milch was asked by the network if he could stage the story in another place. Although the series touches on a variety of issues including race, prostitution, violence, alcohol, politics, and immigration, most of the major story lines are grounded in the issue of bringing order from chaos.

==== Use of profanity ====
From its debut, Deadwood drew attention for its extensive profanity. The historical accuracy and dramatic intent of its use of obscenities has been the subject of controversy and discussion. The word "fuck" is said 43 times in the first hour of the show. It has been reported that the series had a total count of 2,980 "fucks" and an average of 1.56 utterances of "fuck" per minute of footage.

== Plot ==
Season	Episodes	Originally released	
Season	Episodes	First released	Last released
1	12	March 21, 2004	June 13, 2004
2	12	March 6, 2005	May 22, 2005
3	12	June 11, 2006	August 27, 2006
Film		May 31, 2019	

=== Season 1 (2004) ===
Deadwood Season 1 DVD

The first season takes place in 1876, six months after the founding of the camp, soon after Custer's Last Stand. Seth Bullock leaves his job as a marshal in Montana to establish a hardware business in the gold-mining camp of Deadwood, along with his friend and business partner, Sol Star. Wild Bill Hickok, the infamous gunslinger of the west, is on a separate journey to Deadwood, accompanied by Charlie Utter and Calamity Jane. Al Swearengen is the owner of The Gem, a local saloon and brothel. Other notable residents include Dr. Amos Cochran, A. W. Merrick, owner and editor of the local newspaper "The Pioneer", and E. B. Farnum, proprietor of The Grand Central Hotel.

Bullock encounters a man of an unknown name, who claims that Indians had killed an immigrant family along the road, and he and Hickok along with others ride out to investigate. Swearengen at his saloon offers bounties for Indian scalps, in apparent revenge for the murders, and discounts on booze and women. Bullock and Hickok investigate and find the wagon turned over and all but one of the immigrant family killed. Before sunrise they confront the unknown man and point to holes in his story, saying the raid appeared to be a setup by whites. When he draws his weapon both men draw in defense, and Hickok's bullet kills him. Swearengen wakes to hear of these new events as told by Farnum, and is particularly unhappy hearing that one of the immigrant party survived, suspecting that his road agents may have been responsible for the raid.

Brom Garret, a wealthy businessman from New York City, lives at The Grand Central Hotel with his wife, Alma, who nurses a secret laudanum habit. Aware that Garret is interested in prospecting, Swearengen and Farnum deceive him into purchasing a gold claim in a confidence game. Newly arrived Cy Tolliver and his entourage purchase an abandoned hotel across from The Gem and begin renovations, then open the Bella Union Saloon, a luxurious gambling house and brothel. Brom Garret soon learns that his gold claim is worthless and demands Swearengen reimburse his money. Swearengen orders Dan Dority to kill Garret and "make it look like an accident." Dority throws Garret off a cliff, only to discover that the claim is actually a rich one after all. Newly widowed Alma Garret asks Wild Bill Hickok for guidance regarding the gold claim and Swearengen's renewed interest. Hickok asks Bullock to advise Garret; Bullock agrees. Bullock suggests that Garret hire Whitney Ellsworth, a trustworthy and experienced prospector. Alma Garret takes custody of young Norwegian speaking Sofia Metz, whose family was murdered on the way back to Minnesota.

During a poker game, Wild Bill Hickok is murdered by Jack McCall in Tom Nuttall's #10 Saloon. When McCall is put on trial, Swearengen leans on the acting magistrate, suggesting that McCall must be acquitted to avoid scrutiny from Washington, D.C. The judge cuts the trial short and the jury acquits McCall, who leaves town immediately after the verdict. Bullock pursues McCall, determined to bring him to justice. Bullock and Charlie Utter later find McCall hiding at a boarding house and take him to Yankton for trial.

Smallpox spreads in Deadwood, creating an urgent need for vaccines. The afflicted are segregated from the main camp in plague tents. Calamity Jane aids Doctor Cochran in caring for the sick.

The senior members of the community form a municipal government to prepare for future annexation, as well as to bribe the territorial legislature, thereby ensuring the security of existing titles, claims and properties. Swearengen bribes local magistrate Clagett to quash a murder warrant.

Alma's father Otis Russell arrives with plans to secure Alma's new-found wealth in order to pay off his endless debts and fulfill his own greed. The U.S. army arrives in Deadwood and a parade is organized. Bullock confronts a self-confident Otis Russell in The Bella Union. When Russell threatens the safety of his own daughter should Bullock stand in the way of his acquiring the gold claim, Seth unceremoniously beats him and orders Russell to leave the camp.

The increasingly addled Reverend Smith, dying from an apparent brain tumor, is smothered to death by Al Swearengen in a mercy killing. Tolliver attempts to bribe General Crook to leave a garrison in Deadwood but is indignantly refused. When Magistrate Clagett attempts to extort Swearengen further over the murder warrant, Swearengen responds by enlisting Clagett's "toll collector", Silas Adams, to murder Clagett. Silas performs the deed and allies himself with Swearengen, becoming his agent. As Sheriff Con Stapleton has been compromised by Cy Tolliver, Bullock volunteers to become the new sheriff as the cavalry rides out of town.

=== Season 2 (2005) ===
Deadwood Season 2 DVD cover

Season two begins in 1877, seven months after the events of season 1, and the camp has become somewhat more orderly and civilized.

When Swearengen publicly disparages Bullock's abilities as sheriff, intimating that Bullock's focus is not on his job due to his affair with Alma Garret, Bullock removes his gun and badge and Swearengen and Bullock fight, accidentally falling over the Gem balcony. Al is about to slit Bullock's throat in the muddy street, but stops after looking up to see Bullock's wife Martha and her son William arriving in camp. Bullock tells Alma they must either leave camp or stop seeing one another. Garret agrees that it is better to end the relationship and remain in town. Calamity Jane resurfaces and manages to support Bullock and Utter in persuading Swearengen to return Bullock's gun and badge. A truce is made. Garret discovers she is pregnant by Bullock and confides in Trixie, who persuades Ellsworth to make a marriage proposal to Garret and influences Garret to accept the proposal in order to save her the humiliation of unwed motherhood.

Swearengen collapses in his office with the door locked. His concerned associates assume that he wants to be left alone, but as the day passes their alarm grows and they finally break into the office. Dr. Cochran diagnoses Al with kidney stones and performs a draining procedure. Swearengen eventually passes the stones but has a small stroke in the process.

Joanie Stubbs opens her own brothel, The Chez Amis, with her newly arrived partner Maddie. Francis Wolcott, a geologist working for George Hearst, arrives in Deadwood and soon makes his presence felt at the Chez Amis. Wolcott has paid for the transportation of most of the prostitutes, in order to cater to his selective tastes. Cy Tolliver learns of Wolcott's sexual proclivities and baits him, resulting in Wolcott murdering Carrie and Doris, two of Joanie Stubb's prostitutes. When Maddie attempts to extort money from Wolcott, he kills her too. Cy Tolliver has the bodies removed and pardons Wolcott. Joanie sends the remaining girls away so that they will be safe from Wolcott. Joanie confides in Charlie Utter regarding the murders, extracting a promise that he never repeats the information.

Alma fires Miss Isringhausen, Sofia's tutor. Isringhausen turns to Silas Adams under the pretext of fear for her life at the hands of the Widow Garret, and they embark upon a relationship. Isringhausen convinces Adams to allow her to meet with Swearengen. At the meeting, she admits to being an agent of the Pinkertons under the employ of Brom Garret's family, who instructed Isringhausen to frame Alma for soliciting Swearengen to murder her husband. Swearengen agrees to play along, but later reveals to Garret that he intends to blackmail Isringhausen due to his hatred for the Pinkerton agency.

Samuel Fields, the "Nigger General", returns to camp. He tries to enlist Hostetler in his schemes. Bullock is forced to rescue him from an angry mob headed by Steve, a virulently racist drunk. Later, Hostetler catches a drunken Steve in the livery stable masturbating on Bullock's horse in revenge. Fields and Hostetler manage to coerce Steve into signing a written confession of bestiality. The admission will be publicized should Steve make any trouble for either of the livery workers in the future.

Hugo Jarry, a Yankton commissioner, tries to persuade Swearengen and Tolliver that Deadwood should become part of Dakota territory rather than Montana. He ends up siding with Swearengen.

Alma Garret enlists the help of Sol Star to establish a bank in the camp.

Wolcott's agent Lee burns the bodies of captive Chinese prostitutes who have died from malnourishment while under his control. Mr. Wu is enraged and requests Swearengen's help to stop Lee. Because Lee is employed by Wolcott, who is in turn employed by George Hearst, Swearengen refuses any help until after negotiations over the town's future have been resolved. Mr. Wu escapes Swearengen's house arrest at The Gem, but Johnny Burns stops him from exacting his revenge on Lee or being killed himself.

William Bullock is trampled by a horse that escapes during a failed gelding and dies several hours after. His funeral is attended by many of Deadwood's citizens and the service is conducted by former card sharp Andy Cramed, who has returned to Deadwood an ordained minister.

George Hearst arrives in Deadwood and when he learns of the murders committed by Wolcott, confronts and fires him. Hearst purchases the Grand Central hotel from E. B. Farnum. The shamed Wolcott hangs himself. Tolliver claims to be in possession of a letter of confession in which Wolcott states that Hearst was aware of his murderous ways, yet continued his employment. Tolliver blackmails Hearst for 5% of every gold claim he has acquired in Deadwood.

Al Swearengen negotiates with George Hearst on behalf of Mr. Wu, and they agree that Wu can regain his status if his people prove to be better workers than those of the "San Francisco cocksucker" Lee. Mr. Wu and Swearengen's henchmen plan vengeance in Deadwood's Chinatown. The operation is successful and Wu slits the throat of his rival.

Alma Garret and Ellsworth marry at a ceremony conducted by Andy Cramed at the Grand Central hotel. After much dealing and double-dealing on the part of Swearengen and Silas Adams, the official papers confirming Deadwood's annexation into Yankton territory are signed by Bullock and Swearengen with Hugo Jarry present. Andy Cramed stabs Tolliver outside the Bella Union.

=== Season 3 (2006) ===
Deadwood Season 3 DVD cover

Season three begins less than six weeks after the events of season 2. Government and law, as well as the interests of powerful commercial entities, begin to enter the town as Deadwood prepares itself for entry into Dakota Territory.

Hearst has several of his own Cornish miners murdered when they attempt to unionize. Elections are announced: Star and Farnum run for Mayor, while Bullock and barman Harry Manning compete for Sheriff. Angered that Hearst had someone killed in the Gem, Al cancels the election debates in an attempt to reassert his position in the camp. To teach Al a lesson and force him to help Hearst buy Alma's claim, Hearst has his lead henchman Captain Turner restrain Al, then chops off one of his fingers.

Over Ellsworth's strong objections, Alma meets with Hearst to discuss buying her claim. Hearst becomes furious when she offers him a merely non-controlling interest and behaves menacingly towards Alma, but then allows her to leave without following through on his implied threat of rape.

Tolliver slowly recovers after being stabbed and gets back on his feet. Hearst knows Cy is lying about having a letter from Wolcott but decides to employ Cy to help deal with the members of the camp. Traveling actor Jack Langrishe arrives in Deadwood with his theatre troupe. He is an old friend of Swearengen's and eventually buys the former Chez Amis (now a school house) from Joannie Stubbs on condition that he build a new school for the camp's children. Alma undergoes a D & C by Doc Cochran when her pregnancy threatens her health.

Hostetler and Samuel Fields return to the camp to find that Steve has taken over the livery. Bullock mediates between them, eventually getting Hostetler to agree to sell the Livery to Steve. Steve's ranting, racial slurs and impugning of Hostetler's honor finally drive the latter over the edge and he shoots himself.

Another miner is killed. Already angry from the Hostetler/Steve ordeal, Bullock arrests Hearst, drags him by the ear through the public thoroughfare and puts him in jail overnight.

Alma is once again using dope. Leon confesses to Cy that he is Alma's supplier. Cy relays this news to Hearst but Hearst is still angry from his encounter with Bullock and believes that if Tolliver had told him this useful news beforehand he might not have provoked the sheriff. A furious Tolliver tells Leon to do nothing, but Leon, afraid of being implicated in Alma's murder, has already cut her off. Suspecting that Alma's return to drugs is due to her unhappiness at being married to a man she doesn't love, Ellsworth moves out of their house. They later agree to separate and Alma is able to stop taking the laudanum.

Hearst brings a large force of Pinkertons to the camp and encourages them to stir up trouble. Swearengen holds a meeting to decide what to do about Hearst. The town leaders are unable to decide on any direct action, other than to publish a letter from Bullock to the wife of one of the murdered miners that subtly highlights Hearst's callousness. Hearst has Merrick beaten for publishing it.

Alma is shot at in the street. Swearengen takes her into the Gem and orders Dan to kidnap and restrain Ellsworth. Al guesses, correctly, that Hearst ordered the shooting, in an attempt to provoke then kill Ellsworth when he comes to Alma's aid. Hearst sends his second, the same man that beat Merrick and possibly also shot at Alma, to negotiate with Swearengen; Al kills him after extracting information. The town unites to protect Alma as she returns to work at the bank. Hearst has Ellsworth assassinated in his tent at Alma's mine. Trixie shoots Hearst in revenge for Ellsworth's death but fails to kill him. Fearing for her and Sofia's lives and unwilling to make the camp responsible for her protection, Alma sells her claim to Hearst to avoid further bloodshed.

Bullock receives discouraging news about the county election returns in his race for sheriff against Harry Manning, all the while knowing Hearst may have manipulated the results using Federal soldiers brought in to vote for his handpicked candidate elsewhere in the county.

Hearst demands that the whore who shot him be executed. Swearengen and Wu gather a militia in case a war breaks out. Al murders the prostitute Jen, despite Johnny's objections, in the hope of passing her corpse off as Trixie and placating Hearst. The ruse works and Hearst leaves Deadwood, giving over control of "all his other-than-mining interests" to Tolliver. Tolliver points a gun at Hearst from his balcony and wants to shoot him but instead watches as Bullock sees a smirking Hearst out of the camp. Enraged that Hearst is cutting him off, Tolliver takes his frustrations out on Leon by stabbing him in the femoral artery. Johnny and Al speak briefly of Jen's death, before Al returns to scrubbing her bloodstain.

=== Deadwood: The Movie (2019) ===
In 1889, past and present residents of Deadwood are reunited to celebrate South Dakota's impending entrance into the Union as the 40th state.

== Film continuation ==
Following the cancellation of the series, it was reported on June 7, 2006, that HBO and creator David Milch had agreed to make two two-hour television films in place of a fourth season, after Milch declined a short-order of six episodes. This was because in the show's original format, each season portrayed two weeks in the life of Deadwood, with each episode representing one day. The final two-hour format would release these time restraints and allow for a broader narrative to finish off the series. In an interview on January 13, 2007, Milch stated that he still intended to finish the two films, if possible. On July 12, 2007, HBO executives admitted that producing the telefilms would be difficult and put the chances of their ever being made at "50–50".

In an interview on October 1, 2007, actor Ian McShane claimed that the show's sets were due to be dismantled, and the movies would not be made; however, he was referring to the show-related set pieces, i.e., front added to the buildings, props, etc., the set as itself, "Melody Ranch", being unchanged at least as of 2010. Actors Jim Beaver and W. Earl Brown commented a day later that they considered the series to be over. During the March 17, 2009, episode of The Daily Show with Jon Stewart, McShane repeated that "Deadwood is dead." In a January 14, 2011, interview in Esquire, Milch said: "I don't know that the last word has been said on the subject ... I still nourish the hope that we're going to get to do a little more work in that area." In a March 21, 2012, interview, Milch was asked if the movies would ever be produced and replied, "No, I don't think so. We got really close about a year ago. Never say never, but it doesn't look that way."

On August 12, 2015, it was reported that talks between HBO and Milch had resumed regarding a Deadwood film. In January 2016, HBO gave Milch the green-light to write a script for the film. On August 1, 2016, Casey Bloys, HBO's new head of programming, stated that Milch was writing the script for a Deadwood movie. On April 19, 2017, McShane announced that Milch submitted a script for a two-hour Deadwood movie to HBO, saying: "[A] two-hour movie script has been delivered to HBO. If they don't deliver [a finished product], blame them." McShane said that he hoped to discuss the film with Milch further, and said of the original cast returning that "we'd all love to do it ... It would be nice to see all of the old gang again." On November 12, 2017, TVLine reported that the Deadwood movie was set to begin production in fall 2018, although HBO had not officially green-lit the project.

In an interview with the Los Angeles Times on July 20, 2018, Robin Weigert said that a Deadwood film would likely be filmed in the fall of 2018: "It's safe enough to say [the film] is happening this fall." She explained: "There's a set being built and tax incentives to get it done. A lot of [actors] have signed on. There's a 90% chance it'll finally happen." Five days later, on July 25, HBO confirmed that a Deadwood movie had been greenlit and that Dan Minahan, who directed four episodes in the series' original run, would direct the film, with production set to begin in October 2018. On August 21, 2018, W. Earl Brown gave his thoughts on the final draft of the script saying, "In the course of those two hours, my emotions ricocheted in every fucking direction: exhilaration to melancholy; hoots of joy to screams of despair. The Maestro has topped himself. The structure is essentially the same as the first version I read a year and a half ago, but the complexities of the relationships, the emotional peaks and depths, are all sharpened to a razor fine edge. It's gut wrenching."

Brown also confirmed that, "Everyone from the main cast who still draws air, with the exception of Silas Adams (Titus Welliver)", would return. Some members of the original series' cast, including Powers Boothe, Ricky Jay, and Ralph Richeson, died between the conclusion of the series' first run and production of the film continuation. Boothe's small role in an early version of the script was written out, and the characters played by Jay and Richeson were not recast. Welliver was unable to appear in the film due to scheduling conflicts, as he was filming his Amazon Prime series Bosch. Garret Dillahunt and Larry Cedar, who played characters who were killed in the original series, returned as background characters; Dillahunt plays a drunk who throws something at Hearst, yelling: "Hope you die in the street, like my dad did!"

Production on the film began on October 5, 2018, according to Brown. On November 5, 2018, HBO announced that the film had begun production, confirming the returns of several cast members. The film premiered on HBO on May 31, 2019, and received critical acclaim.

== Reception ==
=== Critical response ===
Critical response of Deadwood
Season	Rotten Tomatoes	Metacritic
1	85% (40 reviews)	80 (26 reviews)
2	96% (24 reviews)	93 (15 reviews)
3	95% (39 reviews)	85 (20 reviews)

Deadwood received widespread praise from critics over the course of its three-year run. On Metacritic, the first season has an 80 out of 100 score sampled from 26 critics, indicating "generally favorable reviews". The second season scored 93 out of 100 based on 15 critics, and third season scored 85 out of 100 based on 20 critics, both indicating "universal acclaim", with only one mixed review of the third season coming from Newsday's Verne Gay.

On Rotten Tomatoes, the first season has an approval rating of 85% based on 40 reviews, with an average score of 8.2/10. The site's critical consensus reads, "Deadwood's absorbing first season presents a vivid, un-sanitized depiction of a frontier town that stakes its claim alongside other classic entries in the Western genre." The second season has an approval rating of 96% based on 24 reviews, with an average score of 9.5/10. The critical consensus reads, "Amid the grit and lawlessness, season two of Deadwood offers a richly textured portrait of an Old West community buoyed by its talented ensemble cast." The third season has an approval rating of 95% based on 39 reviews, with an average score of 9/10. The critical consensus reads, "Deadwood's final season ends with a frustrating lack of closure, but that ambiguous final note doesn't detract from an outstanding series that ranks among the best the genre has to offer."

The praise generally centered on the strength of the writing and Milch's unique style of dialogue. Time Out New York's Andrew Johnston listed Deadwood in his top ten TV shows for both 2005 and 2006, commenting: "If history is written by the victors, Deadwood is all about giving the losers their due. In the first season, magnificent bastard Al Swearengen (Ian McShane) came off as a villain; this year, his inevitably doomed campaign to save the lawless town from annexation by the United States and exploitation by robber barons served as a brilliant allegory for the evolution of American capitalism." Film critic Matt Zoller Seitz considers Deadwood to be "the greatest TV show ever" and he wrote a 2022 book detailing the making of the series titled The Deadwood Bible: A Lie Agreed Upon. Matt Zoller Seitz and Alan Sepinwall listed Deadwood as the ninth greatest series of all time in their TV (The Book): Two Experts Pick the Greatest American Shows of All Time.

=== Accolades ===
Award	Year (Note: The listed year refers to the date of the ceremony, not necessarily the year in which the corresponding season or episode aired.)	Category	Nominee(s)	Result	Ref.
ACE Eddie Awards	2006	Best Edited One-Hour Series for Non-Commercial Television	Stephen Mark (for "A Lie Agreed Upon (Part I)")	Won	
ACE Eddie Awards	2007	Best Edited One-Hour Series for Non-Commercial Television	Stephen Mark (for "Tell Your God to Ready for Blood")	Nominated	
ADG Excellence in Production Design Awards	2006	Excellence in Production Design for Single-Camera Television Series	Maria Caso, James J. Murakami, David Potts, Michael J. Kelley (for "Requiem for a Gleet")	Nominated	
ADG Excellence in Production Design Awards	2007	Excellence in Production Design for Single-Camera Television Series	Maria Caso, David Potts, Michael J. Kelley (for "True Colors")	Nominated	
AFI Awards	2004	Program of the Year	Deadwood	Won	
AFI Awards	2005	Program of the Year	Deadwood	Won	
American Society of Cinematographers Awards	2005	Outstanding Achievement in Cinematography in Regular Series	David Boyd (for "Deep Water")	Nominated	
Artios Awards	2004	Best Casting for TV, Dramatic Pilot	Junie Lowry Johnson, Julie Tucker	Nominated	
Artios Awards	2004	Best Casting for TV, Dramatic Episodic	Junie Lowry Johnson	Nominated	
Cinema Audio Society Awards	2005	Outstanding Achievement in Sound Mixing for Television – Series	Geoffrey Patterson, William Freesh, R. Russell Smith (for "Deadwood")	Won	
Cinema Audio Society Awards	2006	Outstanding Achievement in Sound Mixing for Television – Series	Geoffrey Patterson, William Freesh, R. Russell Smith (for "A Lie Agreed Upon (Part I)")	Won	
Cinema Audio Society Awards	2007	Outstanding Achievement in Sound Mixing for Television – Series	Geoffrey Patterson, William Freesh, R. Russell Smith (for "A Two-Headed Beast")	Won	
Costume Designers Guild Awards	2005	Outstanding Period/Fantasy in Television	Katherine Jane Bryant	Nominated	
Costume Designers Guild Awards	2006	Outstanding Period/Fantasy Television Series	Katherine Jane Bryant	Nominated	
Costume Designers Guild Awards	2007	Outstanding Period/Fantasy Television Series	Katherine Jane Bryant	Nominated	
Directors Guild of America Awards	2005	Outstanding Directorial Achievement in Dramatic Series – Night	Walter Hill (for "Deadwood")	Won	
Golden Globe Awards	2005	Best Television Series – Drama	Deadwood	Nominated	
Golden Globe Awards	2005	Best Performance by an Actor in a Television Series – Drama	Ian McShane	Won	
Peabody Awards	2005	Honoree (Note: Presented to Red Board Productions and Paramount Television in association with HBO Entertainment)		Honored	
Primetime Emmy Awards	2004	Outstanding Supporting Actor in a Drama Series	Brad Dourif (for "Deep Water" and "No Other Sons or Daughters")	Nominated	
Primetime Emmy Awards	2004	Outstanding Supporting Actress in a Drama Series	Robin Weigert (for "Deep Water" and "No Other Sons or Daughters")	Nominated	
Primetime Emmy Awards	2004	Outstanding Directing for a Drama Series	Walter Hill (for "Deadwood")	Won	
Primetime Emmy Awards	2004	Outstanding Writing for a Drama Series	David Milch (for "Deadwood")	Nominated	
Primetime Emmy Awards	2005	Outstanding Drama Series	Deadwood (Note: Nominees: Ed Bianchi, Gregg Fienberg, Ted Mann, David Milch, Elizabeth Sarnoff, Scott Stephens, Jody Worth)	Nominated	
Primetime Emmy Awards	2005	Outstanding Lead Actor in a Drama Series	Ian McShane (for "The Whores Can Come")	Nominated	
Primetime Emmy Awards	2005	Outstanding Directing for a Drama Series	Gregg Fienberg (for "Complications")	Nominated	
Primetime Creative Arts Emmy Awards	2004	Outstanding Art Direction for a Single-Camera Series	Maria Caso, James J. Murakami, John F. Brown (for "Deep Water" / "The Trial of Jack McCall" / "Bullock Returns to the Camp")	Nominated	
Primetime Creative Arts Emmy Awards	2004	Outstanding Casting for a Drama Series	Libby Goldstein, Junie Lowry Johnson	Nominated	
Primetime Creative Arts Emmy Awards	2004	Outstanding Costumes for a Series	Katherine Jane Bryant, Le Dawson, Beth Morgan (for "Mister Wu")	Nominated	
Primetime Creative Arts Emmy Awards	2004	Outstanding Hairstyling for a Series	Josée Normand, Peter Tothpal, Susan Carol Schwary, Ellen Powell (for "Plague")	Nominated	
Primetime Creative Arts Emmy Awards	2004	Outstanding Main Title Theme Music	David Schwartz	Nominated	
Primetime Creative Arts Emmy Awards	2004	Outstanding Makeup for a Series (Non-Prosthetic)	John Rizzo, Adam Brandy, Brian McManus, Deborah McNulty (for "Here Was a Man")	Nominated	
Primetime Creative Arts Emmy Awards	2004	Outstanding Sound Editing for a Series	Larry Mann, Stephen Hunter Flick, Mark Larry, Benjamin L. Cook, Takako Ishikawa, Samuel C. Crutcher, Devin Joseph, Kevin Wahrman, Carmine Rubino, Micha Liberman, Amy Kane, Anita Cannella (for "Deadwood")	Won	
Primetime Creative Arts Emmy Awards	2005	Outstanding Art Direction for a Single-Camera Series	Maria Caso, James J. Murakami, David Potts, Ernie Bishop (for "Requiem for a Gleet" / "Complications" / "Childish Things")	Won	
Primetime Creative Arts Emmy Awards	2005	Outstanding Casting for a Drama Series	Libby Goldstein, Junie Lowry Johnson	Nominated	
Primetime Creative Arts Emmy Awards	2005	Outstanding Cinematography for a Single-Camera Series	James Glennon (for "Complications")	Won	
Primetime Creative Arts Emmy Awards	2005	Outstanding Costumes for a Series	Katherine Jane Bryant, Le Dawson (for "Boy-the-Earth-Talks-to")	Won	
Primetime Creative Arts Emmy Awards	2005	Outstanding Hairstyling for a Series	Carol Pershing, Terry Baliel, Kimberley Spiteri (for "Boy-the-Earth-Talks-to")	Won	
Primetime Creative Arts Emmy Awards	2005	Outstanding Makeup for a Series (Non-Prosthetic)	John Rizzo, Ron Snyder, Adam Brandy, Deborah McNulty (for "A Lie Agreed Upon (Part I)")	Won	
Primetime Creative Arts Emmy Awards	2005	Outstanding Single-Camera Picture Editing for a Drama Series	Stephen Mark (for "A Lie Agreed Upon (Part I)")	Nominated	
Primetime Creative Arts Emmy Awards	2005	Outstanding Single-Camera Sound Mixing for a Series	Geoffrey Patterson, William Freesh, R. Russell Smith (for "A Lie Agreed Upon (Part I)")	Nominated	
Primetime Creative Arts Emmy Awards	2007	Outstanding Art Direction for a Single-Camera Series	Maria Caso, David Potts, Ernie Bishop (for "Tell Your God to Ready for Blood" / "True Colors" / "Amateur Night")	Nominated	
Primetime Creative Arts Emmy Awards	2007	Outstanding Cinematography for a Single-Camera Series	Joseph Gallagher (for "The Catbird Seat")	Nominated	
Primetime Creative Arts Emmy Awards	2007	Outstanding Costume for a Series	Katherine Jane Bryant, Le Dawson (for "Amateur Night")	Nominated	
Primetime Creative Arts Emmy Awards	2007	Outstanding Hairstyling for a Series	Peter Tothpal, Carol Pershing, De'Ann Power (for "A Constant Throb")	Nominated	
Primetime Creative Arts Emmy Awards	2007	Outstanding Makeup for a Series (Non-Prosthetic)	John Rizzo, Ron Snyder, Bob Scribner, James R. Scribner (for "I Am Not the Fine Man You Take Me For")	Won	
Primetime Creative Arts Emmy Awards	2007	Outstanding Sound Mixing for a Comedy or Drama Series (One-Hour)	Geoffrey Patterson, William Freesh, R. Russell Smith (for "A Two-Headed Beast")	Nominated	
PRISM Awards	2005	TV Drama Series Multi-Episode Storyline	"The Trial of Jack McCall" / "Plague" / "Bullock Returns to Camp"	Nominated	
PRISM Awards	2005	Performance in a Drama Series Storyline	Robin Weigert	Nominated	
Satellite Awards	2004	Best Actor in a Mini-Series or a Motion Picture Made for Television	Keith Carradine	Nominated	
Satellite Awards	2004	Best Actor in a Supporting Role in a Series, Mini-Series or Motion Picture Made for Television	Brad Dourif	Nominated	
Satellite Awards	2005	Best Actor in a Series, Drama	Ian McShane	Nominated	
Screen Actors Guild Awards	2006	Outstanding Performance by a Male Actor in a Drama Series	Ian McShane	Nominated	
Screen Actors Guild Awards	2007	Outstanding Performance by an Ensemble in a Drama Series	Jim Beaver, Powers Boothe, Sean Bridgers, W. Earl Brown, Dayton Callie, Brian Cox, Kim Dickens, Brad Dourif, Anna Gunn, John Hawkes, Jeffrey Jones, Paula Malcomson, Gerald McRaney, Ian McShane, Timothy Olyphant, Molly Parker, Leon Rippy, William Sanderson, Brent Sexton, Bree Sheanna Wall, Robin Weigert, Titus Welliver	Nominated	
TCA Awards	2004	Outstanding New Program	Deadwood	Nominated	
TCA Awards	2004	Outstanding Achievement in Drama	Deadwood	Nominated	
TCA Awards	2004	Individual Achievement in Drama	Ian McShane	Won	
TCA Awards	2005	Program of the Year	Deadwood	Nominated	
TCA Awards	2005	Outstanding Achievement in Drama	Deadwood	Nominated	
TCA Awards	2005	Individual Achievement in Drama	Ian McShane	Nominated	
TCA Awards	2019	Heritage Award		Won	
Women's Image Awards	2005	Actress Drama Series	Molly Parker (for "Requiem for a Gleet")	Won	
Writers Guild of America Awards	2006	Television: Dramatic Series	Regina Corrado, Sara Hess, Ted Mann, Bryan McDonald, Bernadette McNamara, David Milch, Peter Ocko, Elizabeth Sarnoff, Steve Shill, Nick Towne, Jody Worth	Nominated	
Writers Guild of America Awards	2007	Television: Dramatic Series	W. Earl Brown, Regina Corrado, Alix Lambert, Ted Mann, Bernadette McNamara, David Milch, Kem Nunn, Nick Towne, Zack Whedon	Nominated	

== Music ==
=== Opening credits ===
The Deadwood title music was composed by David Schwartz. According to his website, Schwartz lists the following instruments as having been used: fiddle, cavaquinho, Weissenborn, guitar, harmonium, duduk, and kitchen pots.

=== Closing credits ===
The closing credits music is listed below:

==== Season 1 ====
1. "Hog of the Forsaken" – Michael Hurley
2. "Creek Lullaby" – Margaret
3. "Twisted Little Man" – Michael J. Sheehy
4. "Fallen From Grace" – Mark Lee Scott
5. "God and Man" – Brownie McGhee and Sonny Terry
6. "High Fever Blues" – Bukka White
7. "Old Friend" – Lyle Lovett
8. "Will the Circle Be Unbroken" – June Carter Cash
9. "Stars and Stripes Forever" – Jelly Roll Morton
10. "Hog of the Forsaken" – Michael Hurley
11. "Snake Baked a Ho'cake" – Mike, Peggy, Barbara, and Penny Seeger and their children
12. "Farther Along" – Mississippi John Hurt

==== Season 2 ====
1. "Not Dark Yet" – Bob Dylan
2. "Business You're Doin'" – Lightnin' Hopkins
3. "Skin and Bones" – Ann Rabson
4. "The Fox" – Bill Staines
5. "Life Is Like That" – Big Bill Broonzy
6. "Pretty Polly" – Hilarie Burhans
7. "A Prayer" – Madeleine Peyroux
8. "Rattlesnake" – "Spider" John Koerner
9. "Mama's Gonna Buy" – Vera Ward Hall
10. "Calling All Angels" – Jane Siberry & k.d. lang
11. "Hey Willy Boy" – Townes Van Zandt
12. "Stay a Little Longer" – Bob Wills & His Texas Playboys

==== Season 3 ====
1. "I Got a Razor" – Willie Dixon
2. "Hole in the Wall" – Brownie McGhee
3. "Walking the Dog" – Hans Theessink
4. "Mean Mama Blues" – Ramblin' Jack Elliott
5. "I'm Going Home" – Bama Stuart
6. "Daniel in the Lion's Den" – Bessie Jones
7. "Soul of a Man" – Irma Thomas
8. "O Death" – Alan Lomax, Bessie Jones
9. "Did You Ever Meet Gary Owen, Uncle Joe?" (see Garryowen) – Béla Fleck and Tony Trischka
10. "Dangerous Mood" – Keb' Mo'
11. "Mad Mama Blues" – Josie Miles
12. "O Mary Don't You Weep" – Bruce Springsteen

==== Deadwood: The Movie ====
- "Hog of the Forsaken" – Michael Hurley

== See also ==
- Justified (TV series), another series starring Olyphant as a morally driven lawman
