= E. B. Farnum =

First mayor of Deadwood, South Dakota

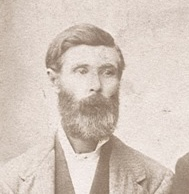
- Farnum
- Born: Ethan Bennett Farnum; November 10, 1826; Cheshire, Massachusetts, U.S.
- Died: After 1900
- Occupations: Merchant, politician
- Known for: First mayor of Deadwood
- Spouse: Mary Farnum
- Children: 3 (Sylvia, Edward, Lyde)

Ethan Bennett Farnum (November 10, 1826 – after 1900) was one of the first residents of Deadwood (then in the Dakota Territory) who was not a miner or prospector; he was the owner of a general store. He was the first mayor of the town of Deadwood.

== Biography ==
Farnum was born in Cheshire, Massachusetts, the eldest of seven children of John Farnum (or Farnham), and his wife, Chloe Bennett. On May 11, 1868, he was appointed Postmaster in Springfield, Walworth County, Wisconsin.

Farnum came to Deadwood from Wisconsin and opened his store in 1876, acquired other Main Street properties, and invested in some of the mining operations such as the Laura Mine and the Prince Oscar Lode; he also partnered with other camp entrepreneurs to have the Deadwood to Centennial Toll Road constructed to ease the flow of supplies to their businesses.

On August 18, 1876, Farnum was elected mayor, winning 672 votes out of 1,139; in this position, he was active in convincing the Dakota Territory to officially recognize the town and establish a nearby Army post, as well as instituting a pest house to quarantine those with communicable diseases (a smallpox epidemic having struck the town in 1876), and a system of street cleaning, all to be funded out of licensing fees for town businesses. In December 1876, Farnum established the town's fire department and sent the town's first telegram, to the mayor of Cheyenne, Wyoming. His position also included duties as head of the school board, Justice of the Peace, and judge. He established the town's first school, in November 1876; officiated at the town's first marriage, of Fannie Garrettson to Daniel Brown; and presided over numerous trials.

Further records are scarce, due to the great fire of September 26, 1879; when these duties became separate positions from the mayoralty, Farnum ran for Justice of the Peace, but lost.

Afterwards, he left for Chicago, Illinois; Farnum is not listed as a town resident in the 1880 census. Who succeeded him directly as mayor is unknown, although Sol Star would eventually be elected to the position, in 1884.

In the 1900 Census, Farnum was living in Maury County, Tennessee.

== Personal life ==
Farnum was married to Mary Farnum. They had three children in 1876 when he arrived in Deadwood: Sylvia, age 16, Edward, age 12, and Lyde, age 2.

== In popular culture ==
Actor William Sanderson portrayed a highly fictionalized E. B. Farnum in the HBO television series Deadwood (2004–2006) and the 2019 television sequel, Deadwood: The Movie.
