= List of casinos in South Dakota =

This is a list of casinos in South Dakota.

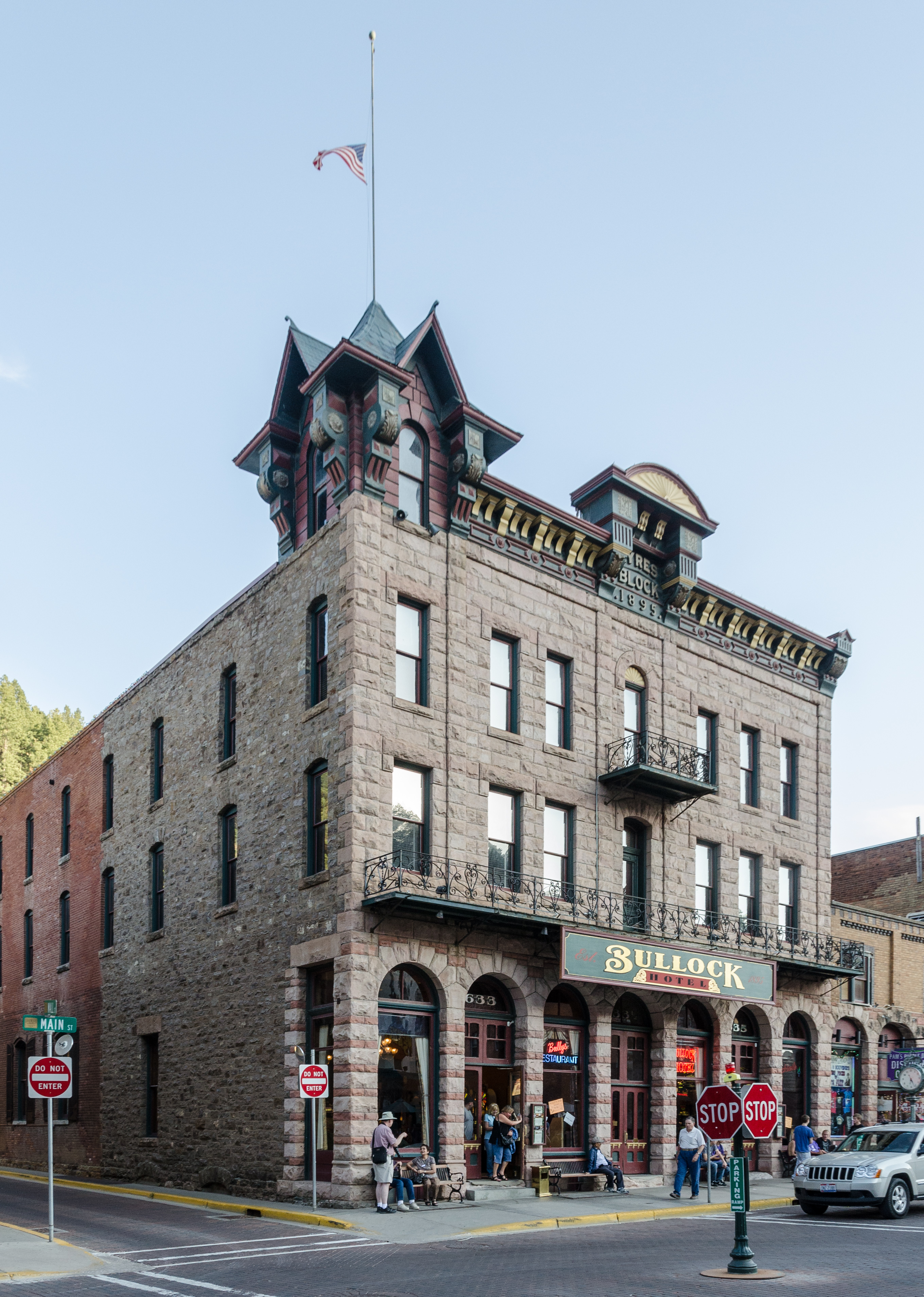
Bullock Hotel

== List of casinos ==
List of casinos in the U.S. state of South Dakota
Casino	City	County	State	District	Type	Comments
Buffalo Bodega Gaming Complex	Deadwood	Lawrence	South Dakota
Cadillac Jack's Gaming Resort	Deadwood	Lawrence	South Dakota
Dakota Connection Casino	Sisseton	Roberts	South Dakota		Native American	I-29 Exit 232 (Highway 10)
Dakota Sioux Casino & Hotel	north of Watertown	Codington	South Dakota		Native American	west of I-29 Exit 185
Deadwood Gulch Gaming Resort	Deadwood	Lawrence	South Dakota
Deadwood Mountain Grand Casino & Hotel	Deadwood	Lawrence	South Dakota
Deadwood Station Bunkhouse & Gambling Hall	Deadwood	Lawrence	South Dakota
First Gold Hotel & Gaming	Deadwood	Lawrence	South Dakota
Fort Randall Casino & Hotel	east of Pickstown	Charles Mix	South Dakota		Native American	on Hwy 46 near Missouri River
Gold Country Inn Gambling Hall & Cafe	Deadwood	Lawrence	South Dakota
Gold Dust Gaming & Entertainment Complex	Deadwood	Lawrence	South Dakota
Golden Buffalo Casino & Hotel	Lower Brule	Lyman	South Dakota		Native American
Grand River Casino & Resort	west of Mobridge	Corson	South Dakota		Native American	US Hwy 12 west of Missouri River
Hickok's Casino	Deadwood	Lawrence	South Dakota
Historic Bullock Hotel	Deadwood	Lawrence	South Dakota
Iron Horse Inn	Deadwood	Lawrence	South Dakota
Lucky 8 Gaming	Deadwood	Lawrence	South Dakota
Lode Star Casino & Hotel	Fort Thompson	Buffalo	South Dakota		Native American
The Lodge at Deadwood Gaming Resort	Deadwood	Lawrence	South Dakota
Main Street Deadwood Gulch	Deadwood	Lawrence	South Dakota
Mineral Palace Hotel & Gaming	Deadwood	Lawrence	South Dakota
Mustang Sally's	Deadwood	Lawrence	South Dakota
Old Style Saloon No. 10 (The Utter Place)	Deadwood	Lawrence	South Dakota
Oyster Bay Bar & Casino	Deadwood	Lawrence	South Dakota
Prairie Wind Casino & Hotel	between Oelrichs and Oglala	Oglala Lakota	South Dakota		Native American	on US Hwy 18
Rosebud Casino and Quality Inn Rosebud Casino	south of Mission	Todd	South Dakota		Native American	US 83 north of Valentine, NE
Royal River Casino & Hotel	Flandreau	Moody	South Dakota		Native American
Silverado Franklin Historic Hotel & Gaming Complex	Deadwood	Lawrence	South Dakota
Tin Lizzie Gaming Resort	Deadwood	Lawrence	South Dakota
VFW Casino	Deadwood	Lawrence	South Dakota
Wooden Nickel Casino	Deadwood	Lawrence	South Dakota

== Gallery ==
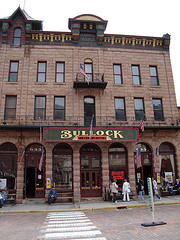
Bullock Hotel

== See also ==
- List of casinos in the United States
- List of casino hotels
