= LWIU =

LWIU may refer to:

- Laundry Workers' International Union
- Lumber Workers Industrial Union
