= Seth Bullock =

Canadian-American frontiersman (1849–1919)

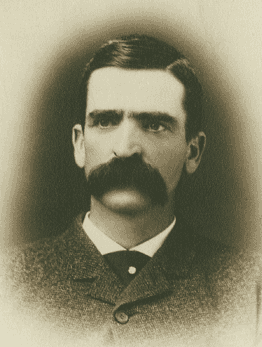

United States Marshal for South Dakota
- In office January 13, 1906 – February 8, 1914
- Preceded by: Edward G. Kennedy
- Succeeded by: Thomas W. Taubman

Sheriff of Lawrence County, Dakota Territory
- In office March 6, 1877 – December 6, 1877
- Preceded by: None (position created)
- Succeeded by: John J. Manning

Sheriff of Lewis and Clark County, Montana Territory
- In office December 1, 1873 – November 30, 1875
- Preceded by: Patrick Powers
- Succeeded by: Joseph C. Walker

Personal details
- Born: July 23, 1849 Amherstburg, Province of Canada
- Died: September 23, 1919 (aged 70) Deadwood, South Dakota, U.S.
- Resting place: Mount Moriah Cemetery
- Party: Republican
- Spouse: Martha Bullock (m. 1874)
- Children: 3
- Occupation: Businessman; Rancher; Law enforcement officer

Seth Bullock (July 23, 1849 – September 23, 1919) was a Canadian-American frontiersman, business proprietor, politician, sheriff, and U.S. Marshal. He was a prominent citizen in Deadwood, South Dakota, where he lived from 1876 until his death, operating a hardware store and later a large hotel, the Bullock Hotel.

== Early life ==
Many of the details of Bullock's early life are lost. He was born in Amherstburg, Canada West (now Ontario), on the Canadian side of the Detroit River.

His father, retired British Army Sergeant Major and hero George Bullock, was known to be active in the politics of Sandwich, Canada West (amalgamated in 1935 into the City of Windsor). Bullock's mother was a Scotswoman born Agnes Findley.

By 1860, George Bullock was forced to resign his position as County Treasurer due to missing funds. To avoid prosecution in Canada, he fled to Detroit, Michigan, leaving his eight children alone in Sandwich. Bullock's mother had died during this time, so the children were left to take care of themselves. The property owned by Bullock's father in Sandwich was either seized by his creditors or sold at public auction in 1863, as he had defaulted on his mortgage and other debts.

Bullock's childhood was not a happy one. His father was a strict disciplinarian, known to beat young Seth for minor infractions. Bullock ran away first at age 13, then again at age 16 to Montana to live temporarily with his older sister, Jessie Bullock. By age 18, he had permanently left home.

== Helena ==
In 1867, Bullock became a resident of Helena, Montana Territory, where he unsuccessfully ran for the Territorial Legislature. He was subsequently elected as a Republican to the Territorial Senate, served in 1871 and 1872, and helped create Yellowstone National Park. In 1873, he was elected sheriff of Lewis and Clark County.

== Deadwood, South Dakota ==
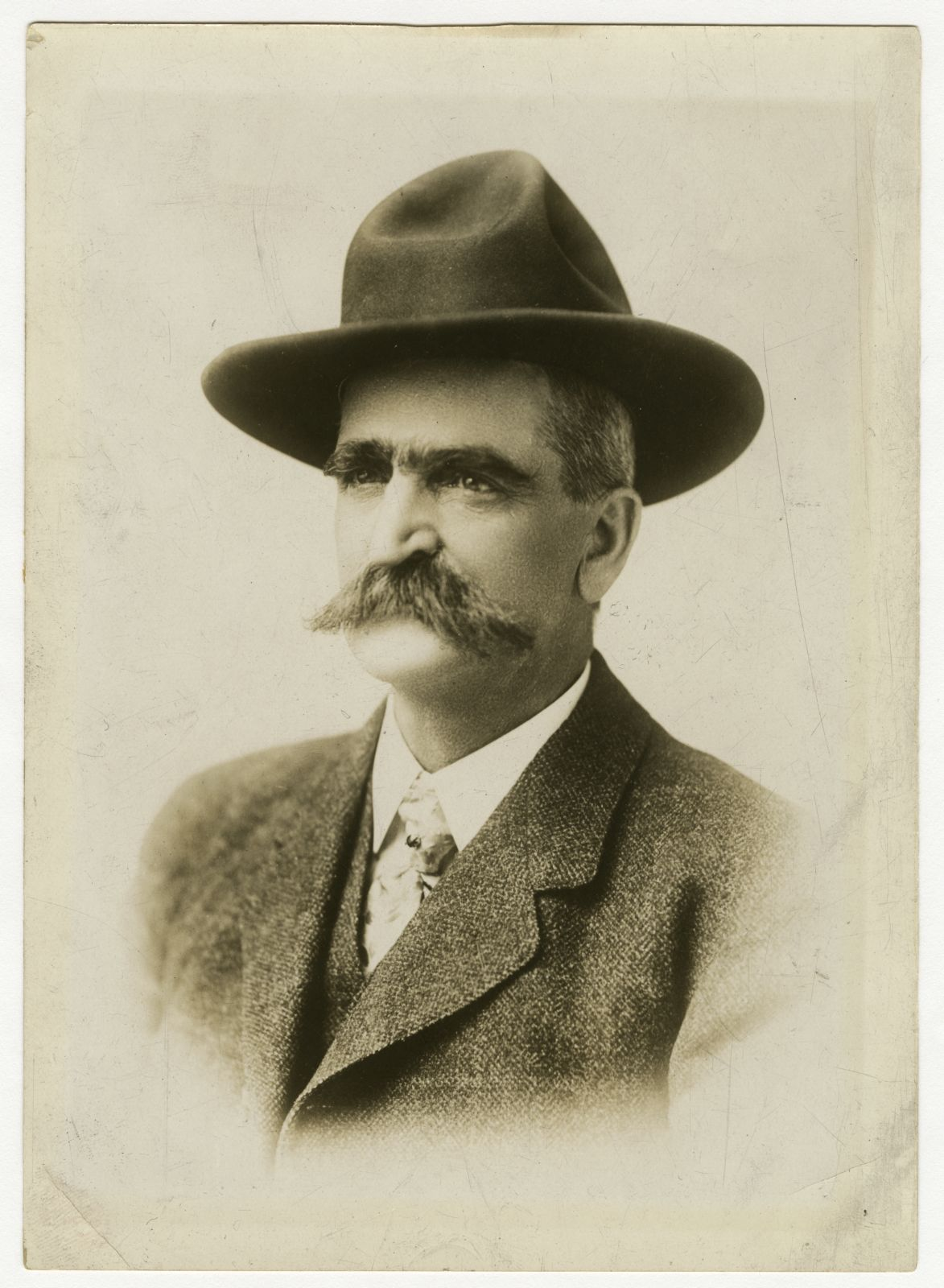
Seth Bullock, 1893

In 1876, he decided that an untapped market for hardware existed in the gold rush town of Deadwood, in the Dakota Territory, so he moved there with friend and partner Sol Star to open a hardware store. In August 1876 they purchased a lot and set up shop as "Office of Star and Bullock, Auctioneers and Commission Merchants," first in a tent and then in a building.

Deadwood was a lawless, rowdy gold mining camp. According to several historians, including John Ames in "The Real Deadwood" and Kenneth C. Kellar in "Seth Bullock: Frontier Marshal Deadwood", days after Bullock and Star's arrival, Wild Bill Hickok was murdered by Jack McCall. The Deadwood newspaper indicates Hickok was killed on August 2, 1876. According to a letter Bullock sent a friend, he had arrived in Deadwood on August 3, 1876. If Bullock's letter is accurate, he never met Hickok.

According to contemporary news accounts, McCall shot Hickok in the back of the head while Hickock was playing poker. McCall was found not guilty by an impromptu camp court, after which he promptly left Deadwood. McCall was arrested later and re-tried for murder, found guilty and executed by hanging. The demand for law enforcement grew louder following Hickok's murder. In February 1877, Lawrence County, which included Deadwood, was officially created by the Territorial Legislature. Territorial Governor John L. Pennington appointed Bullock to be its interim, and first, County Sheriff until the first county elections could be held in November.

Bullock's tenure as Sheriff lasted approximately nine months. Bullock took the job seriously, deputizing several residents and tackling the job of civilizing the camp. Despite, or perhaps because of, a reputation for fearlessness and an uncompromising nature, Bullock managed the task without killing anyone in the violent town. In fact, one of Bullock's first duties was to confront Dodge City, Kansas Deputy City Marshal Wyatt Earp, who was possibly interested in the Sheriff's job. Bullock rebuffed Earp telling him that his services were not needed. A week later, Earp left Deadwood to return to Dodge City.

Bullock also had several "run-ins" with Al Swearengen, proprietor of the Gem Theater, One of Deadwood's notable brothels. Swearengen had a knack for making money from vice and shrewdly invested some of his profits in cultivating alliances with the camp's wealthy and powerful.

Having attained some stability in Deadwood, Bullock brought his wife Martha Eccles Bullock and daughter, Margaret, to town from her parents' home in Michigan, where they had been living during this period. They subsequently had another daughter, Florence, and a son, Stanley.

In November 1877, the first county elections were held, and Bullock for Sheriff on the Peoples Party (Republican) ticket, while John J. Manning was the Democrat Party candidate. Manning won, and in 1878, Bullock ran again, this time as a Republican. Manning won reelection, and he was elected a third time in 1879.

Bullock and Star purchased a ranch where Redwater Creek met the Belle Fourche River and dubbed it the S & B Ranch Company. Bullock is also credited with introducing alfalfa farming to Dakota Territory in 1881. Later, he became a Deputy U.S. Marshal, partnered with Star and Harris Franklin in the Deadwood Flouring Mill and invested in mining, the local growth industry. Bullock and Star eventually expanded their business interests to the towns of Spearfish, Sturgis, and Custer.

Bullock, then a Billings County Deputy Sheriff from Medora, North Dakota, met Theodore Roosevelt in 1884 while bringing a horse thief known as "Crazy Steve" into custody on the range, near what would become the town of Belle Fourche. The two became lifelong friends, Roosevelt later saying of Bullock, "Seth Bullock is a true Westerner, the finest type of frontiersman."

== Belle Fourche and the Bullock Hotel ==
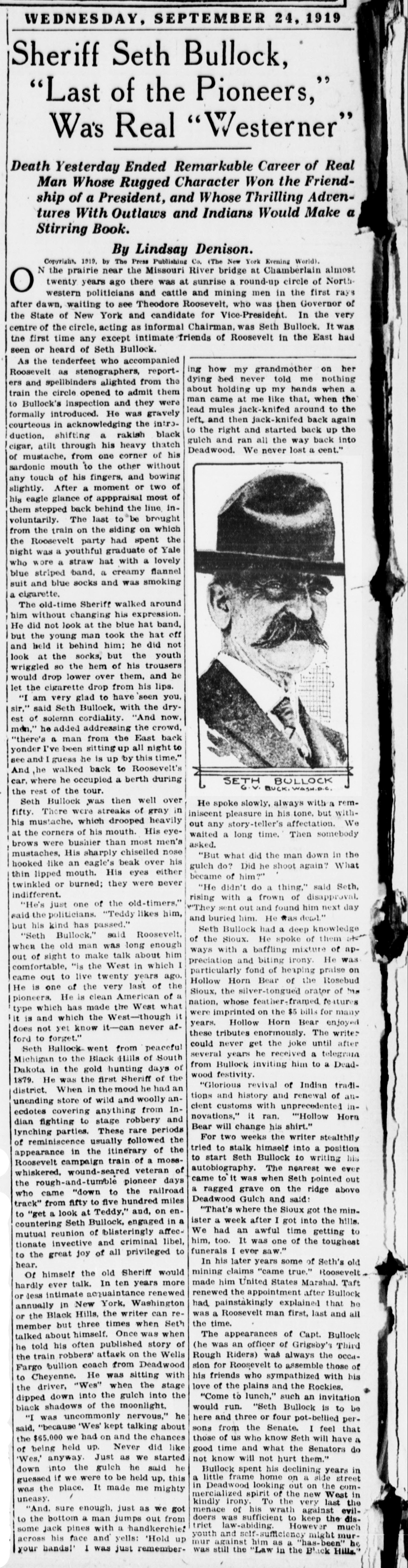
Obituary of Seth Bullock

Bullock and Star contributed further to the economic development of the region by convincing the Fremont, Elkhorn, and Missouri Valley Railroad to build a track by offering them 40 acres (16 ha) of free right-of-way across their land when a speculator purchased the right of way to Minnesela and demanded a high price from the railroad. The railroad built a station three miles (5 km) northwest of Minnesela in 1890, and Bullock and Star were instrumental in founding the town of Belle Fourche, offering free lots to anyone moving from Minnesela. Belle Fourche became the largest railhead for livestock in the United States and the county seat was changed from Minnesela to Belle Fourche.

Bullock and Star's hardware store in Deadwood burned down in 1894. Rather than rebuild, they built Deadwood's first hotel on the site—a three-story, 63-room luxury hotel. The Bullock Hotel continues to operate to this day, now incorporating a casino.

== Later life and death ==
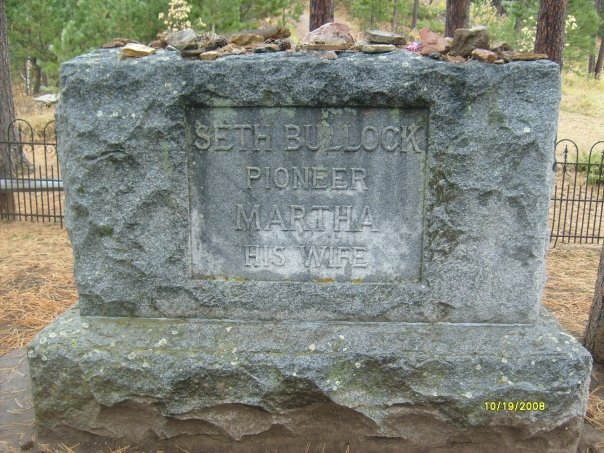
Seth Bullock's grave at Mount Moriah Cemetery, Deadwood, South Dakota.

Bullock's friendship with Roosevelt led to his becoming captain and commander of Troop A in the Cavalry regiment organized by Melvin Grigsby. The war ended before Bullock's troop left its training camp in Louisiana, and he returned to South Dakota. When Roosevelt became vice president under President William McKinley, he arranged the appointment of Bullock as the first forest supervisor of the Black Hills Reserve. After Roosevelt was elected president, Bullock organized 50 people (including Tom Mix) to ride in the inaugural parade in 1905. Roosevelt appointed Bullock U. S. Marshal for South Dakota in 1905 and President William Howard Taft reappointed him in 1909. Roosevelt later selected Bullock as one of 18 officers (others included Frederick Russell Burnham, James R. Garfield, and John M. Parker) to raise a volunteer infantry division, Roosevelt's World War I volunteers, for service in France in 1917.

Congress gave Roosevelt the authority to raise up to four divisions similar to the Rough Riders; however, as commander-in-chief, President Woodrow Wilson refused to use the volunteers and the unit was disbanded. After Roosevelt's death in January 1919, Bullock created a monument to him with the aid of the Black Hill Pioneers, dedicated on July 4, 1919, on Sheep Mountain, which was renamed Mount Roosevelt.

Bullock died of colon cancer shortly thereafter, on September 23, 1919, at his home at 28 Van Buren Street in Deadwood. He is buried in Mount Moriah Cemetery in Deadwood, along with Wild Bill Hickok and Calamity Jane, with his grave facing Mount Roosevelt. Bullock's grave is more than 750 feet away from the main cemetery grounds.

== In popular culture ==
Bullock was portrayed by Timothy Olyphant in HBO's critically acclaimed TV series Deadwood (2004–2006). Olyphant reprised the role for the HBO sequel Deadwood: The Movie (2019).
