= Minnesela Bridge =

Historic bridge in South Dakota, United States

- U.S. National Register of Historic Places
- Location within South Dakota Location within the United States
- Nearest city: Belle Fourche, South Dakota
- Coordinates: 44°38′28″N 103°49′19″W
- Area: less than one acre
- Built: 1917
- Built by: Concrete Engineering Co.
- Architectural style: Vernacular
- MPS: Historic Bridges in South Dakota MPS
- NRHP reference No.: 93001277
- Added to NRHP: December 9, 1993

The Minnesela Bridge is a historic bridge located in Butte County, South Dakota. Formally known as South Dakota Department of Transportation Bridge No. 10-114-395, it passes over Redwater Creek about 1.5 miles (2.4 km) southeast of Belle Fourche. It was built in 1917 and was listed on the National Register of Historic Places in 1993 as part of the Historic Bridges in South Dakota Multiple Property Submission. It was one of the earliest concrete bridges constructed in the state. Concrete Engineering Company built multiple concrete bridges in the Rapid City area in the late 1910s, and due to the quality of their construction, many have survived. The bride was built at a cost of $2,588. Its common name is in reference to the nearby site of the ghost town of Minnesela, which sits just a few feet east of the bridge.

== Architecture ==
It is a single-span concrete deck arch bridge measuring 25 by 49 feet (7.6 by 14.9 m) long. Concrete Engineering Company designed it in a vernacular style. The arch is a segmental barrel arch with filled spandrels and recessed panels. It has a balustrade along the bridge and wing walls which "appears as crenelation pierced by semi-circular arches." The guardrails have decorative castellated beams.
