= Dead man's hand =

Poker hand purportedly held by Wild Bill Hickok when he was killed

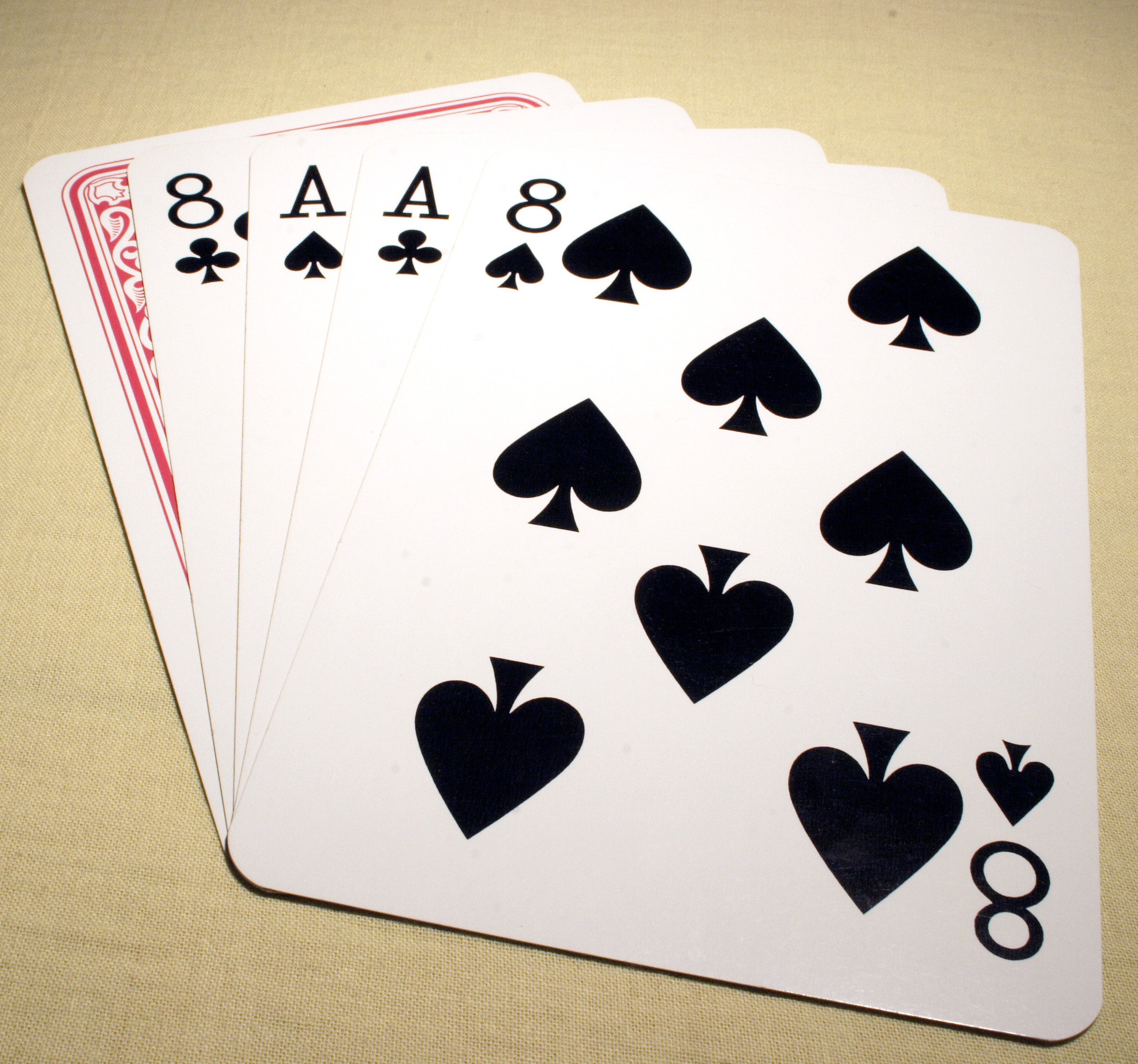
The card hand purportedly held by Wild Bill Hickok at the time of his death: black aces and eights

The makeup of poker's dead man's hand has varied throughout its history. Currently, it is described as a two-pair poker hand consisting of the black aces and black eights. The pair of aces and eights, along with an unknown kicker, were reportedly held by Old West folk hero, lawman, and gunfighter Wild Bill Hickok when he was murdered while playing a game. No contemporaneous source, however, records the exact cards he held when killed. Author Frank J. Wilstach's 1926 book Wild Bill Hickok: The Prince of Pistoleers led to the popular modern held conception of the poker hand's contents.

== Use of the phrase ==
The expression "dead man's hand" appears to have had some currency in the late 19th and early 20th centuries, although no one connected it to Hickok until the 1920s. The earliest detailed reference to it was 1886, where it was described as a "full house consisting of three jacks and a pair of tens" (J J J 10 10). Three jacks and red sevens (J J J 7♥ 7♦) are called the dead man's hand in the 1903 Encyclopaedia of Superstitions, Folklore, and the Occult Sciences. The 1907 edition of Hoyle's Games refers to the hand as jacks and eights (J J 8 8 ?). In Bob Dylan's song Rambling, Gambling Willie (written and recorded in 1962) the protagonist of the song is shot while playing a game of poker and was holding "aces backed with eights", "that dead man’s hand".

== Hickok's hand ==
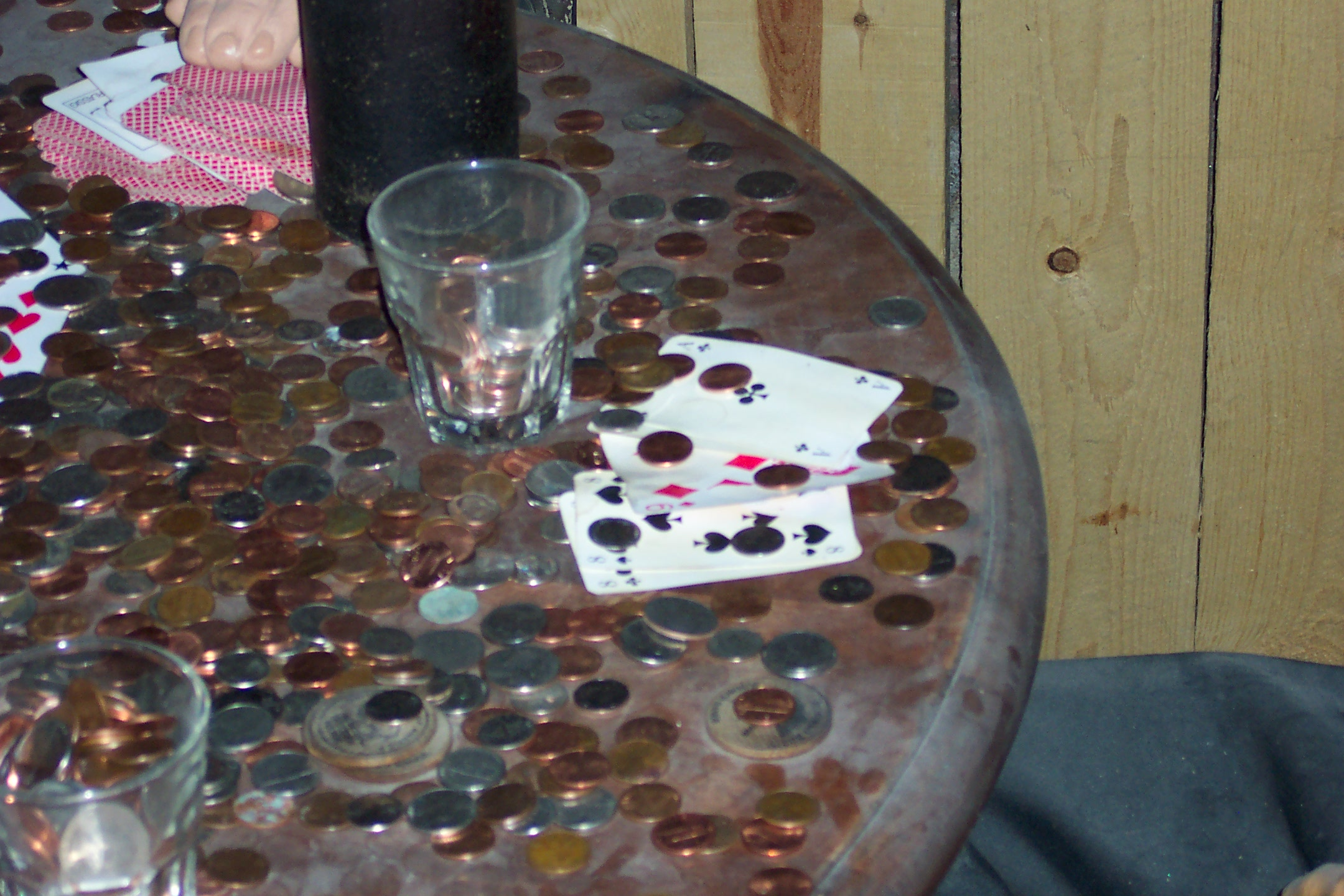
Display in Deadwood, South Dakota with the dead man's hand (here given as A♠ A♣ 8♠ 8♣ 9♦)

What is currently considered the dead man's hand card combination received its notoriety from a legend that it was the five-card stud or five-card draw hand held by Wild Bill Hickok when he was shot in the back of the head by Jack McCall on August 2, 1876, in Nuttal & Mann's Saloon, Deadwood, Dakota Territory. Hickok's final hand purportedly included the aces and eights of both black suits.

According to the book Wild Women of the West by Western historian Carl W. Breihan, the cards were retrieved from the floor by a man named Neil Christy, who then passed them on to his son. The son, in turn, told Mr. Breihan of the composition of the hand. "Here is an exact identity of these cards as told to me by Christy's son: the ace of spades with a heel mark on it; the ace of clubs; the two black eights, clubs and spades, and the queen of hearts with a small drop of Hickok's blood on it" (A♠ A♣ 8♠ 8♣ Q♥), though nothing of the sort was reported at the time immediately following the shooting.

Hickok biographer Joseph Rosa wrote about the make-up of the hand: "The accepted version is that the cards were the ace of spades, the ace of clubs, two black eights, and the queen of clubs as the 'kicker'" (A♠ A♣ 8♠ 8♣ Q♣). Rosa, however, said that no contemporaneous source can be found for this exact hand. The solidification in gamers' parlance of the dead man's hand as two pairs, black aces and eights, did not come about until after the 1926 publication of Wilstach's book—50 years after Hickok's death.

== See also ==
- List of poker playing card nicknames
