= Roosevelt's World War I volunteers =

Proposed American military formation to fight in France

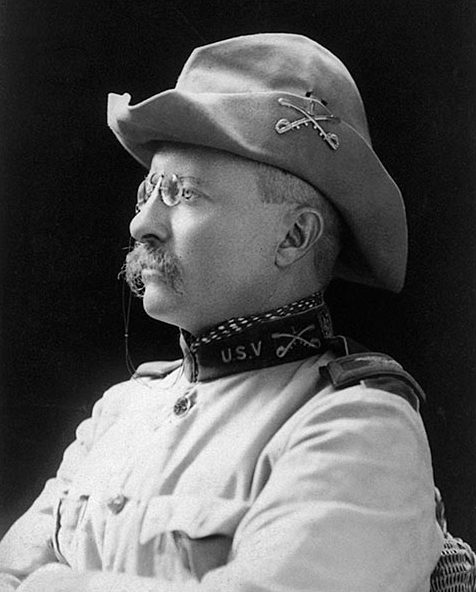
Col. Theodore Roosevelt in Rough Rider uniform

Roosevelt's World War I volunteers was a proposed military volunteer formation of Americans to fight in France for the Allies.

== Background ==
In his book Foes of Our Own Household (1917), Theodore Roosevelt explains that he had authorization from Congress to raise four divisions to fight in France, similar to his earlier Rough Riders, the 1st United States Volunteer Cavalry Regiment and to the British Army 25th (Frontiersmen) Battalion, Royal Fusiliers. He had selected eighteen officers (including Seth Bullock, Frederick Russell Burnham, James Rudolph Garfield, John M. Parker, and Henry L. Stimson) and directed them to actively recruit volunteer troops shortly after the United States entered the war. With the help of John Hays Hammond, the New York-based Rocky Mountain Club enlisted Major Burnham to raise the troops in the Western states and to coordinate recruitment efforts. Wilson ultimately rejected Roosevelt's plan and the volunteer Army disbanded.

After several months of correspondence with Newton D. Baker, Secretary of War, Roosevelt sent this telegram to President Woodrow Wilson:

To the President: May 18, 1917.

White House, Washington, D. C.

I respectfully ask permission immediately to raise two divisions for immediate service at the front under the bill which has just become law, and hold myself ready to raise four divisions, if you so direct. I respectfully refer for details to my last letters to the Secretary of War. If granted permission, I earnestly ask that Captain Frank McCoy be directed to report to me at once. Minister Fletcher has written me that he is willing. Also if permission to raise the divisions is granted, I would like to come to Washington as soon as the War Department is willing, so that I may find what supplies are available, and at once direct the regular officers who are chosen for brigade and regimental commands how and where to get to work.

THEODORE ROOSEVELT.

President Wilson, as Commander-in-chief, sent back this response:

THE WHITE HOUSE, Washington, D. C, May 19, 1917.

I very much regret that I cannot comply with the request in your telegram of yesterday. The reasons I have stated in a public statement made this morning, and I need not assure you that my conclusions were based entirely upon imperative considerations of public policy and not upon personal or private choice.

WOODROW WILSON.

Roosevelt then sent the following to the men who had volunteered for immediate service on the firing line in the Divisions which Congress authorized:

May 21, 1917.

The President has announced that he will decline to permit those divisions to be organized or to permit me to have a command in connection with such a force. After consultation yesterday, personally or by wire, with some of the men who have volunteered to raise units—regiments and battalions—for the divisions, including John C. Groome, of Pennsylvania; Seth Bullock, of South Dakota; John C. Greenway, of Arizona; John M. Parker, of Louisiana; Robert Carey, of Wyoming; J. P. Donnelly, of Nevada; Sloan Simpson, of Texas; D. C. Collier and F. R. Burnham, of California; I. L. Reeves, Frazer Metzger, and H. Nelson Jackson, of Vermont; Harry Stimson, W. J. Schieffelin, and William H. Donovan, of New York, and Messrs. James R. Garfield, Raymond Robbins, R. H. Channing, David M. Goodrich, W. E. Dame, George Roosevelt, Richard Derby and various others who were immediately accessible, it was decided unanimously that in view of the decision of the President the only course open to us is forthwith to disband and to abandon all further effort in connection with the divisions, thereby leaving each man free to get into the military service in some other way, if that is possible, and, if not, then to serve his country in civil life as he best can.

As good American citizens we loyally obey the decision of the Commander-in-Chief of the American Army and Navy. The men who have volunteered will now consider themselves absolved from all further connection with this movement. The funds that have been promised will be treated as withdrawn and applied to other purposes. I therefore direct that this statement be sent to the leaders in the various states who have been raising troops and that it be published.

Our sole aim is to help in every way in the successful prosecution of the war and we most heartily feel that no individual's personal interest should for one moment be considered save as it serves the general public interest. We rejoice that a division composed of our fine regular soldiers and marines under so gallant and efficient a leader as General Pershing is to be sent abroad. We have a right to a certain satisfaction in connection therewith.

The Brooklyn Eagle last evening stated authoritatively that "the sending of this expedition was a compromise between the original plans of the General Staff, which favored no early expedition, and the request of Colonel Roosevelt for authority for an immediate expedition. The Roosevelt agitation, backed by the express desire of such distinguished military leaders as General Joffre and General Petain, unquestionably had its effect in bringing about the Pershing expedition. The compromise is that France gets American soldiers in the trenches, but Roosevelt will not lead or accompany them. It is believed in Washington that any criticism for turning down Roosevelt will be fully answered by the fact that American soldiers are going over."

If this gives the explanation of the matter, I gladly say that we are all unselfishly pleased to have served this use, although naturally we regret not to have been allowed ourselves to render active service. It is due to the men who have come forward in this matter during the three and a half months since February 2d, when I began the work of raising one or more divisions, that the following facts should be known:

If yesterday my offer immediately to raise four divisions for immediate use at the front had been accepted the various units of the first division would tomorrow have begun to assemble at whatever points the War Department had indicated, and they would have assembled in full force and without an hour's delay as rapidly as the War Department directed them where to go and as soon as it provided them camping places, tents, blankets, etc.

We were prepared by the use of private funds partly to make good any immediate lack in such supplies as regards many of the units. Fifteen days afterward the second division would have mobilized in a similar fashion, and then, at intervals of thirty days, the two other divisions.

In accordance with what I had found to be the wish of the military authorities among our allies, each of the divisions would have been ready to sail for France for intensive training at the theater of war within thirty days of the time it began to mobilize, if the War Department were able to furnish supplies; and we would have asked permission to use the rifles and ammunition now in use in the French and British armies.

All four divisions would have sailed and two would have been on the firing line by September ist, the time at which the Secretary of War has announced that the assembling of the selective draft army is to begin. About one-half of our men, at least of those in the first division, were men who had already seen military service. I wish respectfully to point out certain errors into Which the President has been led in his announcement. He states that the purpose was to give me an "independent" command. In my last letter to the Secretary of War I respectfully stated that if I were given permission to raise an army corps of two divisions, to be put under the command of some General like Wood or Bell or Pershing or Barry or Kuhn, I desired for myself only the position of junior among the eight brigade commanders. My position would have been exactly the same as theirs, except that I would have ranked after and have been subordinate to the rest of them.

The President alludes to our proffered action as one that would have an effect "politically," but as not contributing to the "success of the war," and as representing a "policy of personal gratification or advantage." I wish respectfully but emphatically to deny that any political consideration whatever or any desire for personal gratification or advantage entered into our calculations. Our undivided purpose was to contribute effectively to the success of the war.

I know nothing whatever of the politics of the immense majority of the men who came forward, and those whose politics I do know numbered as many Democrats as Republicans. My purpose was to enable the Government to use as an invaluable military asset the men who would not be reached under the selective draft, who were fit for immediate service, and the great majority of whom would not otherwise be used at all.

As above pointed out, all four divisions, if the War Department could equip them, would have been sent to the aid of our hard-pressed allies before the training of the selective draft army was even begun, and they would not have been put into the firing line until the French and British military authorities deemed them fit.

The President says in effect that to comply with our offer would have been mischievous from the military standpoint and he adds that the regular officers whom I have asked to have associated with me are "some of the most effective officers of the regular army, "who" cannot possibly be spared from the duty of training regular troops." One of the chief qualifications for military command is to choose for one's associates and subordinates "the most effective officers," and this qualification the President thus states that I possess.

As for my withdrawing them from the "more pressing and necessary duty of training" the troops, I wish to point out that I had asked for about fifty regular officers from lieutenant-colonels to second lieutenants for the first division. This would be only about one-tenth of the number who will go with General Pershing's division which, the President announces, is to be composed exclusively of regulars. Therefore, the present plan will take from "most pressing and necessary duty" about ten times as many regular officers as would have been taken under our proposal.

It has been stated that the regular officers are opposed to our plan. As a matter of fact "the most effective" fighting officers have been eager to be connected with or to have under them the troops we proposed to raise. The President condemns our proposal on the ground that "undramatic" action is needed, action that is "practical and of scientific definiteness and precision." There was nothing dramatic in our proposal save as all proposals indicting eagerness or willingness to sacrifice life for an ideal are dramatic. It is true that our division would have contained the sons or grandsons of men who in the Civil War wore the blue or the gray; for instance, the sons or grandsons of Phil Sheridan, Fitz Hugh Lee, Stonewall Jackson, James A. Garfield, Simon Bolivar Buckner, Adna R. Chaffee, Nathan Bedford Forest; but these men would have served either with commissions or in the ranks, precisely like the rest of us; and all alike would have been judged solely by the efficiency—including the "scientific definiteness"—with which they did their work and served the flag of their loyal devotion.

THEODORE ROOSEVELT.

A few days later, Roosevelt sent this letter to all the men who had done work in personally raising units for the proposed Divisions which had been authorized by Congress:

May 25, 1917.

My dear Sir:

You have doubtless seen the President's announcement wherein he refused to make use of the Volunteer Forces which Congress had authorized him to permit me to raise. Prior to this announcement by the President, I had sent him a telegram as follows: [-- Ed. note: see above --]

Accordingly, I communicated with as many of the men who had agreed to raise units for service in this division as possible, and after consultation with about twenty of them I issued the statement which is herewith appended. I now release you and all your men. I wish to express my deep sense of obligation to you and to all those who had volunteered under and in connection with this division.

As you doubtless know, I am very proud of the Rough Riders, the First Volunteer Cavalry, with whom I served in the Spanish–American War. I believe it is a just and truthful statement of the facts when I say that this regiment did as well as any of the admirable regular regiments with which it served in the Santiago campaign. It was raised, armed, equipped, drilled, mounted, dismounted, kept two weeks aboard transports and put through two victorious aggressive fights in which it lost one-third of the officers and one-fifth of the men; all within sixty days from the time I received my commission.

If the President had permitted me to raise the four divisions, I am certain that they would have equalled the record, only on a hundredfold larger scale. They would have all been on the firing line before or shortly after the draft army had begun to assemble, and moreover they could have been indefinitely reinforced, so that they would have grown continually stronger and more efficient.

I regret from the standpoint of the country that your services were not utilized. But the country has every reason to be proud of the zeal, patriotism and businesslike efficiency with which you came forward.

With all good wishes,

Faithfully yours,

THEODORE ROOSEVELT

In his correspondence with President Wilson and the Secretary of War, Roosevelt did not mention the fact that he was planning to recruit at least one regiment, and perhaps a brigade (two regiments) of African-American troops for the division. He discussed plans for raising and equipping such a unit with F. S. Stover, a wealthy Philadelphia businessman who was raising funds for the proposed division.

In May, 1917, while he waited for Wilson's response to his proposal, he offered command of the regiment (or the brigade, if one were formed) to Lieutenant Colonel Charles Young, the senior African-American officer in the Regular Army, a friend and associate of W.E.B. DuBois, and author of a systematic study of the cultural bases of military power, The Military Morale of Races and Nations (1912). Roosevelt had known Young since 1901, had great respect for his talents, and in 1904 had appointed him to the newly formed Military Intelligence Division of the General Staff. On May 8, 1917 Young had written to ask Roosevelt's help in opposing the Army's effort to force his retirement for supposed medical reasons. In fact, the army wanted to avoid having to give Young the kind of active-service appointment his rank and experience entitled him to, because the army wished to avoid any situation in which White officers might have to take orders from a senior Black officer. Roosevelt's response was to offer him command of the proposed regiment or brigade: "there is not another man [than yourself] who would be better fitted to command such a regiment." He also promised Young "carte blanche" in appointing staff and line officers for the unit.

He then wrote to Stover, telling him to "communicate with Lieutenant Colonel Young, the colored United States Officer, a thoroughly fine fellow. It seems to me he should command your regiment if it is raised. I would love to have [the regiment] with me if the President lets me go." On May 30, Young thanked Stover for giving him the opportunity to command "a regiment of my own people," and added: "I know men of high character and efficiency who could make good in these positions and do honor to themselves, their race, country, and to yourself [Stover] as the Organizer of the regiment." All these plans came to nothing when Wilson refused Roosevelt permission to organize his volunteer division. Young was retired for medical reasons during the war, then reappointed to active duty after it was over. Nevertheless, the proposal indicates a change in Roosevelt's racial attitudes, perhaps influenced by the persuasive scientific and sociological arguments of Young's book.

== In fiction ==
In the alternate history short story Over There by Mike Resnick, Roosevelt managed to blackmail Wilson into letting him raise a revived force of Rough Riders and take it to France, but Wilson ordered General Pershing keep them away from the front and avoid any chance of Roosevelt getting killed. Disobeying orders and determined to recreate his glorious moment of San Juan Hill, Roosevelt led his men to a completely aggressive and victorious head-on attack on entrenched German machine-gun positions, capturing the enemy’s position. On hearing of his courageous actions, President Wilson said "He is one of the greatest Americans in history, America is waiting for his return... His actions will always be remembered".
