= Bullock Hotel =

Historic site in Deadwood, South Dakota

Coordinates: 44°22′40″N 103°43′44″W

- Interactive map of Bullock Hotel
- Location: Deadwood, South Dakota
- Owner: Bullock Properties
- Type: Hotel
- Event: Other

Construction
- Built: 1894-1895
- Opened: 1896
- Renovated: 1991 - 1997
- Cost: $40,000

Website
- https://www.historicbullock.com/

The historic Bullock Hotel is located at the corner of Wall Street and Main Street in Deadwood, South Dakota. It was built by Seth Bullock, an early sheriff of Deadwood, and his business partner Sol Star, in around 1895 at a cost of $40,000 and is the oldest hotel in Deadwood, boasting a casino, restaurant, and 28 of its original 63 rooms.

== Origins ==
The Bullock Hotel was built by Seth Bullock between 1894 and 1896 from a converted warehouse to a 3-story hotel shortly after the Deadwood fire of 1894, which destroyed the original 2-story wood-frame building and devastated much of the town of Deadwood. It is believed that the hotel was originally constructed and decorated in an "Italianate" and Victorian style with the first floor of the hotel boasting a large dining room in the rear, a kitchen and pantry, a sample room where salesmen could store their cases, a grand hotel lobby, and offices in the front.

The second and third stories are said to have held 63 luxury sleeping rooms with baths down the halls and two large banks of skylights for lighting the inner rooms with natural light. It is also believed that all rooms were furnished with iron and brass beds and oak furnishings.

== Resale and renovation ==
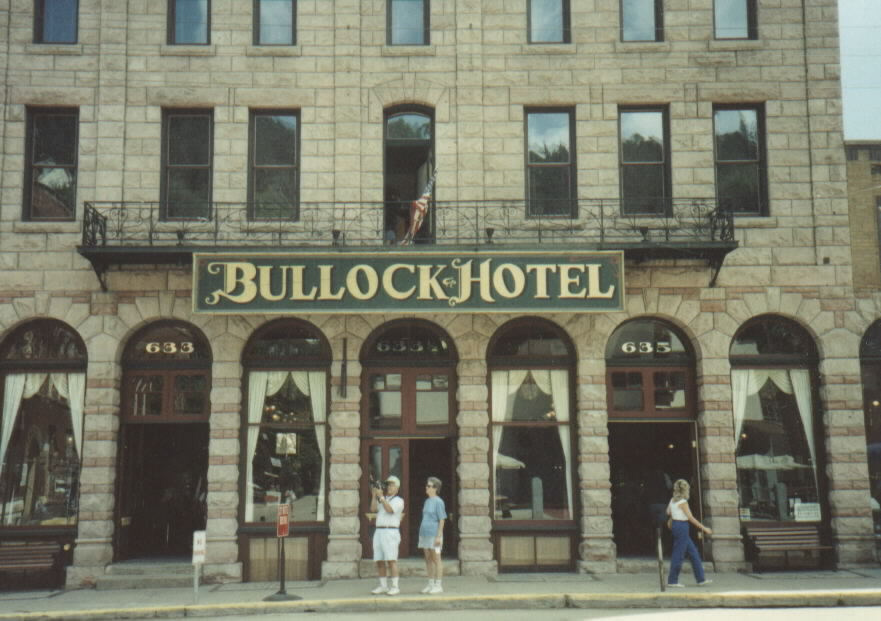
The hotel in 1991

The Hotel was sold to the Aryes family who in 1976 converted the building to a hardware store up until around 1991 when the building underwent subsequent renovation by the new owners, Bullock Properties, to convert it back into a hotel. The original furnishings had been sold at auction by the Aryes family in 1976, so in 1991-1993 the hotel underwent extensive renovation to re-create the original atmosphere and decor. The current owners state that the hotel has been "carefully restored based on the best available information regarding the late 1800s and by uncovering details that gave clues as to the original decor." Some changes included lowering some ceilings (due to heat accumulation at the ceilings), paint stripping and re-staining of most woodwork, and a re-papering and decorating of ceilings which was thought to reflect the hotel's original Victorian designs. 48-inch solid brass chandeliers were also introduced as light fixtures, chosen from replicas of the period. The kitchen and pantry were further converted into a restaurant and bar, Bully's, named for Seth Bullock's lifelong friend, Teddy Roosevelt.

All in all, even with reported attempts to retain original floor plans as much as possible, the former 63 rooms were reduced to 28 in the restoration. This supposedly resulted in some rather unusual rooms with odd shapes and angles and a larger version of the original rooms from 1895. Modern plumbing and renovation brought the baths in from the hallway, and all rooms are equipped with private baths. Some luxury rooms are reported to have Jacuzzis and wet bars as well.

== Haunting folklore ==
Contrary to popular belief, Seth Bullock did not die at the hotel in room 211, but at his home at 28 Van Buren Street. It is possible that incorrect reports of his demise at the hotel propagated reports of his ghost being sighted at the hotel, which continue to this day by guests, workers, and tourists. Many people who have supposedly had contact with Bullock's ghost say that they were never harmed, but merely touched or called out for. Apparitions and orbs have often been reported by guests. Employees say the ghost merely continues to "play host" and often makes sure "his" employees are working hard, because many employees have said when they were taking breaks, they felt paranormal presence, and got back to work immediately. Ghost tours of the hotel are held regularly, and many thrill-seekers, ghost hunting groups and non-believers have spent the night. In 2015, the hotel was featured on a special Halloween episode of Ghost Adventures.

== See also ==
- List of casinos in South Dakota
- List of casinos in the United States
- List of casino hotels
