= Nuttal & Mann's =

Saloon and death-place of "Wild Bill" Hickok

Coordinates: 44°22′42″N 103°43′45″W

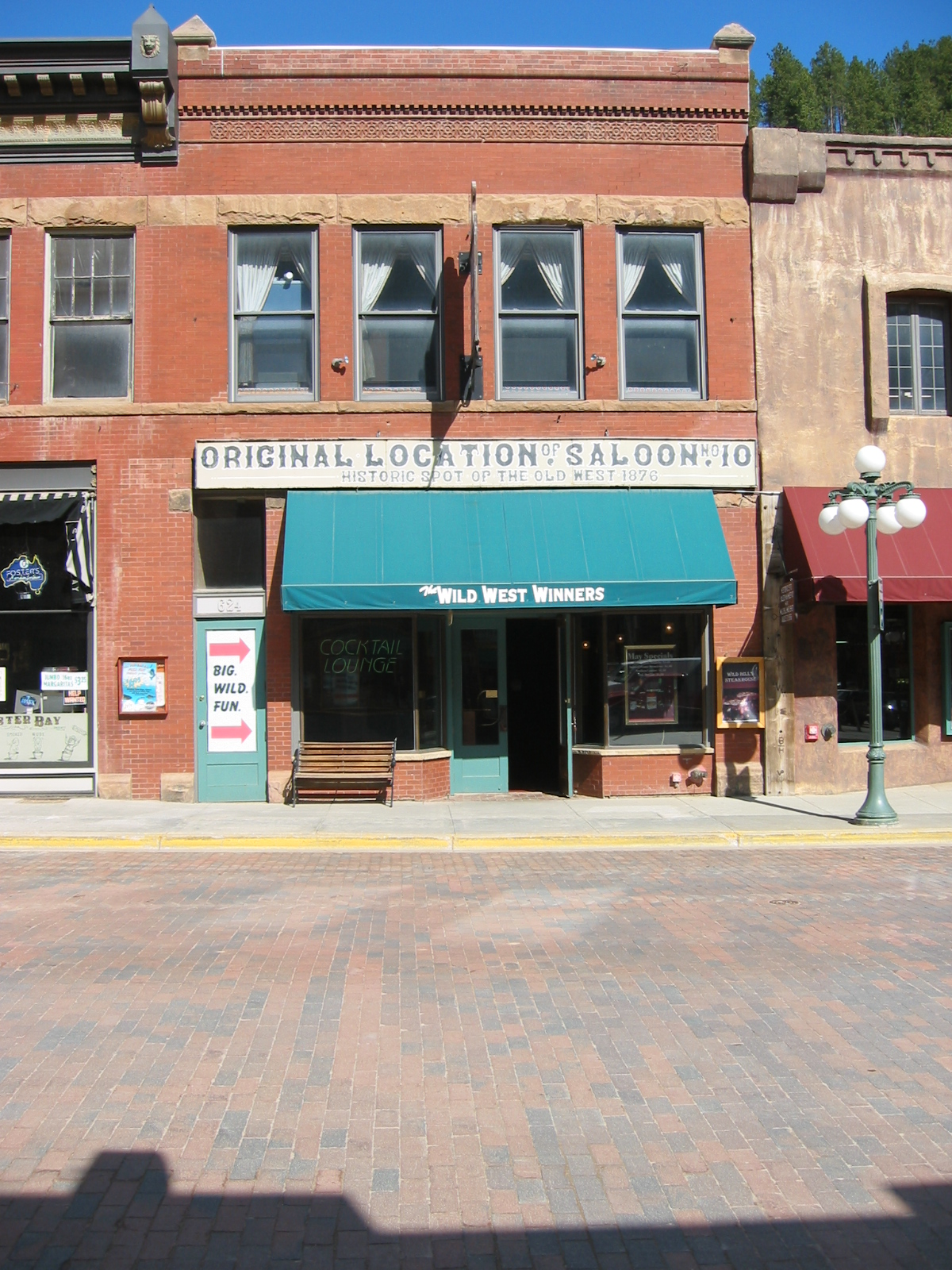
624 Lower Main Street, Deadwood, South Dakota; the location of the original Nuttal & Mann's saloon, where Wild Bill Hickok was killed (although this is not the original building, which burned down).

Nuttal & Mann's was a saloon located in Deadwood, southern Dakota Territory, North America. It was noted for being the death-place of James Butler "Wild Bill" Hickok. It was later renamed the "No. 10 Saloon". The current No. 10 Saloon is not at the same location as the original Nuttal & Mann's.

== Death of "Wild Bill" Hickok ==
=== Background ===
On the evening of August 1, 1876, Hickok was playing poker with a group of men. One of the men, Jack McCall, was an infrequent poker player and had been playing poorly. After McCall had lost his final hand, Hickok returned some of his losings and suggested he get something to eat with the money. It has been reported that McCall may have taken this gesture to be condescending.

=== Assassination ===
The following afternoon, Hickok entered Nuttall & Mann's Saloon and, while drinking at the bar, was invited to join the poker game. Hickok always preferred to sit with his back against the wall to avoid being vulnerable to attack from an adversary. However, the only seat available at the table had its back to the door of the saloon. Hickok asked one of the players, Charlie Rich, to switch seats but was refused. He reluctantly took the vacant seat. Subsequently, McCall entered the saloon, calmly walked up behind Hickok and shouted "Damn you! Take that!" as he shot him in the back of the head with a .45 caliber revolver. The bullet exited through Hickok's cheek and hit Capt. Massie, another poker player, in the wrist. McCall fled, while a few people attempted to revive Hickok. The attempts were futile, as he likely died instantly from the bullet wound to the head. The poker hand Hickok was holding when he was shot was reportedly a pair of eights and a pair of aces–all black–which has become known as the "dead man's hand" of today.

== Aftermath ==
Jack McCall was apprehended as he attempted to flee town, and the next day was given an impromptu trial in which he was acquitted of the murder, claiming he was avenging his brother's death. However, less than a month later, McCall was re-charged with the murder after bragging about what he had done while in the Wyoming Territory. He was brought back to the capital of the territory, Yankton, for arraignment. At his re-trial, McCall was found guilty of the murder of Hickok and was executed by hanging on March 1, 1877. He was buried with the noose still around his neck.

== Later history of the site ==
The original building at the site burned down in 1879. The I.H. Chase Building, which housed a clothing store, was built on the site in 1898. When Chase moved out, Frank X. Smith opened a beer hall. The building later housed the Eagle Inn, the sign of which still hangs on the upper portion of the building. The building (at 624 Lower Main St.) formerly housed the "Wild West Casino." It then was a vacant building until a couple bought it in March 2013 and re-opened it in July 2013 as "Wild Bill's Trading Post" where antiques and souvenirs are sold. The owners are remodeling the basement into a recreated scene of the shooting of James Butler Hickok by Jack McCall. The building displays a sign that says it was the actual location at which Hickok was shot.

A saloon of the same name later opened in a different location on Main Street, along with many of the original site's decorations (including the chair in which Hickok was supposedly sitting when he was shot, although this has never been verified), and renamed the Saloon #10. The two are not related in any way but name.
