= Laundry Workers' International Union =

North American trade union

The Laundry Workers' International Union (LWIU) was a labor union representing laundry workers in Canada and the United States.

The union was founded in November 1900 at a congress in Troy, New York, as the Shirt, Waist and Laundry Workers' International Union. It was chartered by the American Federation of Labor to represent both makers and launderers of shirts. In 1909, its shirt makers were transferred to the United Garment Workers of America, but it began representing all workers in laundries, and became the LWIU.

In 1925, the union had 6,500 members, but this figure grew to 100,000 in 1953. It became part of the new AFL-CIO in 1955. In 1956, it absorbed the International Association of Cleaning and Dye House Workers, changing its name to the Laundry, Cleaning and Dye House Workers' International Union. This merger occurred without the consent of the AFL-CIO, and in 1957, the federation expelled the union, on charges of corruption. In March 1962, the union merged into the International Brotherhood of Teamsters.

== Presidents ==
1900: John J. Manning
1912: James F. Brock
1932: Robert Roy Burt
1935: Bill Donovan
1943: Ray Nickelson
1945: Sam J. Byers
1957: Ralph Thomas Fagan
