= Minnesela, South Dakota =

Minnesela
- Ghost town
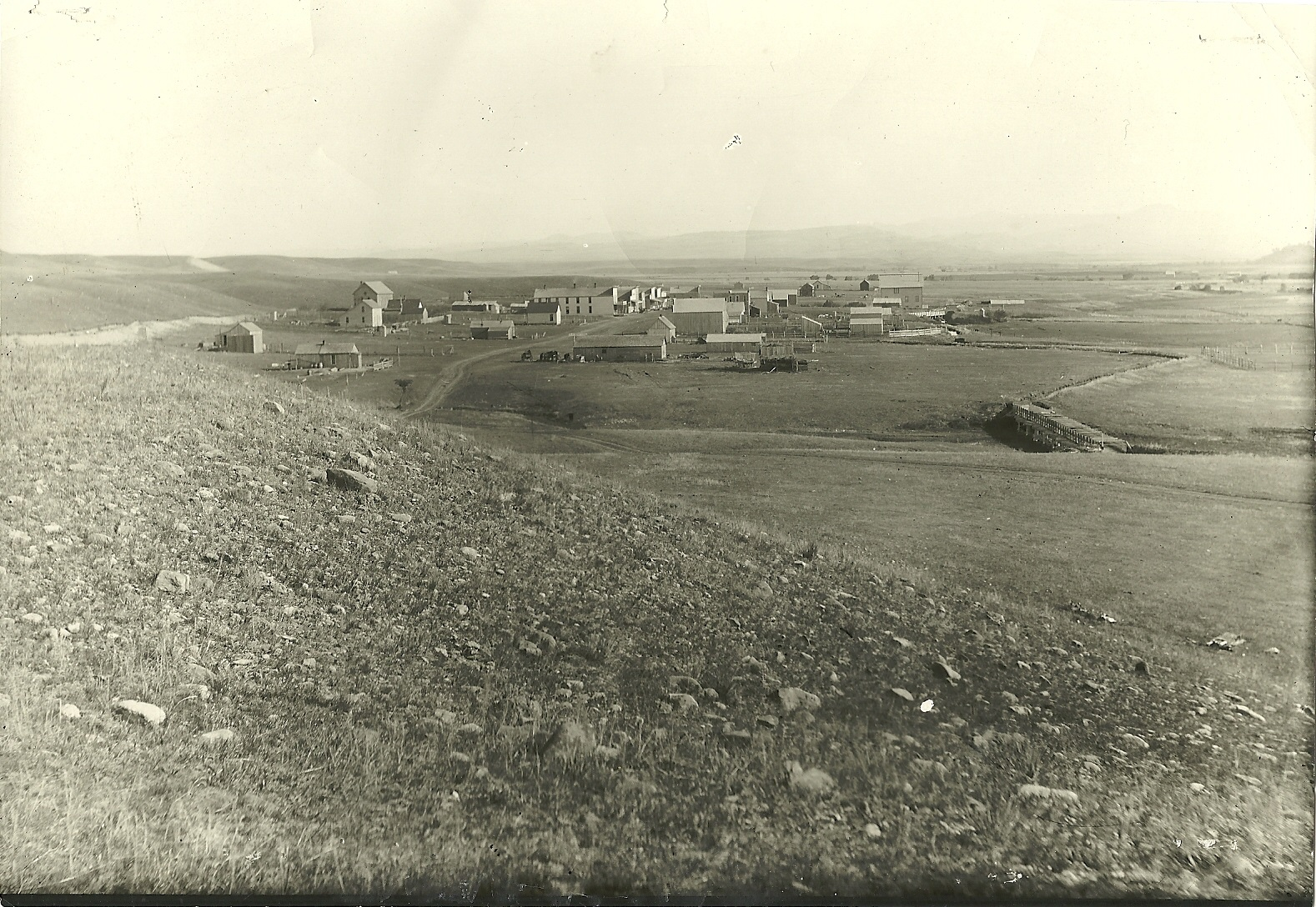
- Minnesela in 1890

- Location of Minnesela within South Dakota. Minnesela (the United States)
- Coordinates: 44°38′30″N 103°51′32″W
- Country: United States
- State: South Dakota
- County: Butte
- First settled: 1876
- Founded: 1882
- Disbanded: 1901
- Named for: Lakota: "red waters"
- Elevation: 3,173 ft (967 m)

Population (2010)
  - Total: 0
- Demonym: Minneselans
- Time zone: UTC-7 (MST)
  - Summer (DST): UTC-6 (MDT)
- GNIS feature ID: 1173792

Minnesela (Lakota: mni šeyéla; "red water") is a ghost town and was the first settlement in and county seat of Butte County, South Dakota, United States. Minnesela was founded in 1882 and was located three miles southeast of present-day Belle Fourche. The railroad's decision to bypass Minnesela and to continue on to Belle Fourche in 1890 caused the town to be abandoned by 1901.

== History ==
=== Settlement and founding ===
In 1876, American pioneer John T. Spaulding and his brother-in-law Thomas J. Davis built the first home, a two-story log cabin, 2.5 miles (4.0 km) southeast of present-day Belle Fourche. It was constructed from logs felling|felled in the Black Hills between Crook City and Deadwood; the logs were then hauled to the site. The house was made up of a living room, parlor, kitchen, children's room, and a main bedroom. During the next five years, homesteaders gradually settled the area. After Spaulding left, his cabin was used by many settlers in the area until the late 1930s. Minnesela was plotted in 1881 by D. T. Harrison and Azby Chouteau. In early 1882, after the population of the area reached 100, the community decided to build the town on the east bank of Redwater River, 0.5 miles (0.80 km) south of Spaulding's cabin.

=== Growth ===
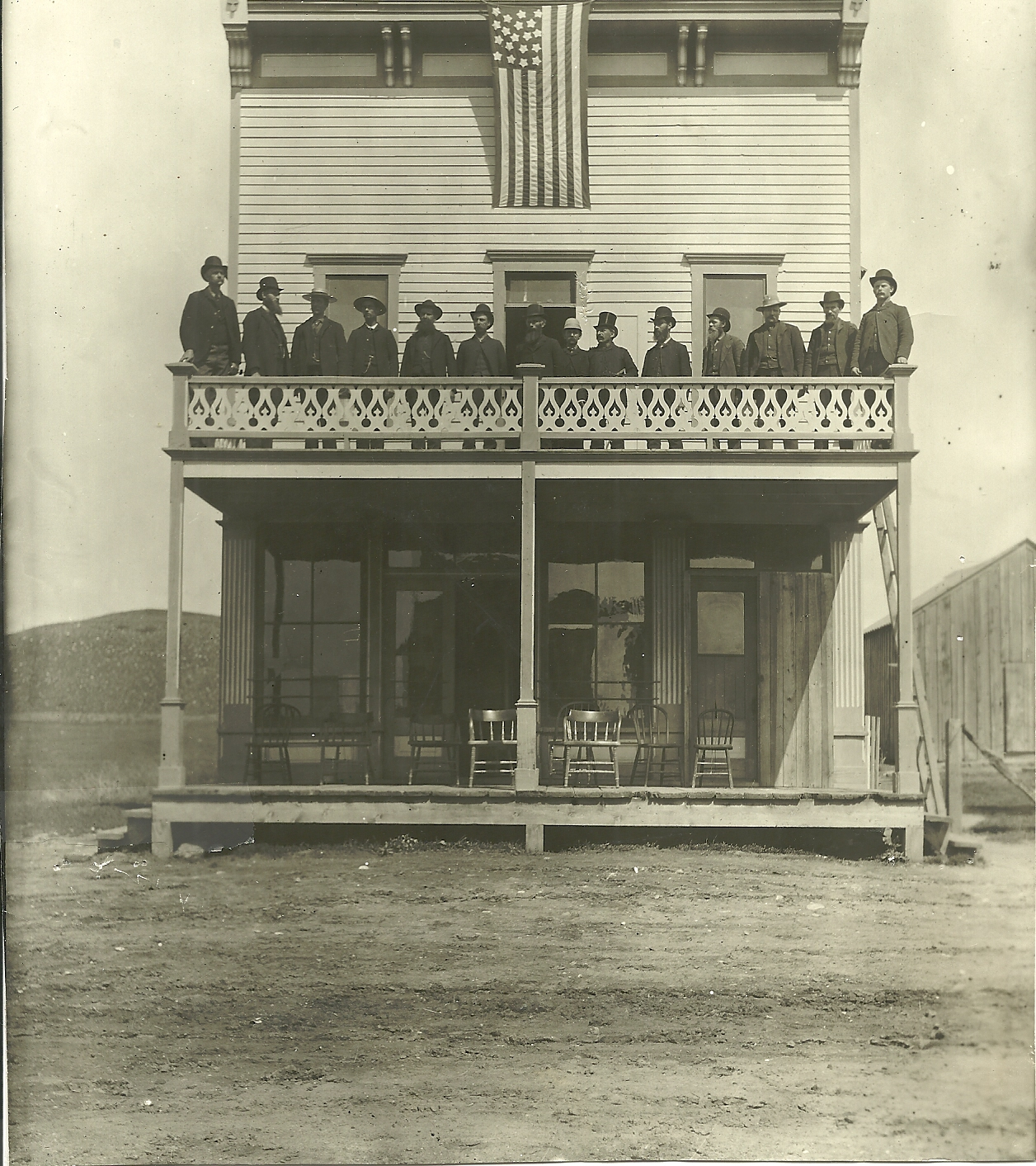
Minnesela founders standing on the balcony of the hotel in 1889

In 1882, Minnesela had about 100 residents and became the county seat of Butte County. The town flourished, and by 1883, its residents had built a post office, two saloons, about six stores, Commercial Club, school, Methodist church, bank, hotel, and flour mill. The school was built from the Minnesela jail. Minnesela had two newspapers, one of which was known as the Butte County Star. The cemetery, which has 102 interments, was created in 1887 to the north of the town.

Because it was then the only town on the prairies just north of the Black Hills, Minnesela was an ideal place for a trade center. Minneselans called their town "the future metropolis of the Black Hills and the midland city of the United States" and the "coming Chicago of the Midwest."

=== Decline and abandonment ===
Seth Bullock and his business partner, Sol Star, moved into the area and built the SB Ranch at the confluence of the Redwater and Belle Fourche Rivers in 1879. This ranch grew to become famous throughout the West for its thoroughbred trotting horse breeding, and in the spring of 1881, Bullock planted the first crop of alfalfa in the Western United States. In 1884, the Marquis de Mores created a stage line in order to connect Deadwood to the Northern Pacific Railroad, which passed through Medora, North Dakota. A few shacks, a stage barn, and a saloon were set up on the SB Ranch. The stage line failed after only a few trips, and the line shut down; however, the saloon remained open, to the disapproval of many Minneselan women. The last building on the De Mores station site burned down in 1888. Minnesela experienced severe winter weather; the snow sometimes covered windows 2-stories high. In 1886, a hot, dry summer and a powerful winter blizzard destroyed farmers' crops and ranchers' livestock. By 1887, the Minneselans had turned to the Fremont, Elkhorn, and Missouri Valley Railroad for expansion.

In 1890, the railroad began laying track north of Whitehood. Minnesela expanded its town site in preparation for its arrival and listed new land for purchase. Bullock agreed to negotiate with the railroad company on behalf of Minnesela's newly-established board of trade. At the meeting, railroad owners said that they wanted donated land and preferred an 80-acre spot south of Minnesela that was open for filing. Resident Douglas Sayre left the meeting and went to Rapid City's land office on his fastest horse. After the meeting, railway right-of-way man T. G. Carter took a locomotive from Whitewood to Rapid City. Carter met Sayre in the land office and offered Sayre $500 for the land; instead, Sayre laughed and said that his price for the "Golden 80" was climbing over $5,000. By the time Sayre raised it to $10,000, there were no takers.

Bullock donated a large amount of land on his ranch to allow the train depot to be built on the former site of the De Mores Station. On August 14, 1890, the last rail between Whitewood and the Middle Creek stockyards was laid, and the railroad began shipping livestock. Belle Fourche was founded on May 1, 1891. Bullock offered free land to Minneselans and their businesses. Despite the hostility between the two towns' residents, most people accepted, and Belle Fourche grew rapidly. One of the first buildings to move was the Butte County Bank. In 1894, the two towns competed for the county seat. Belle Fourche offered to build a courthouse for free and collected over 100 outside voters. They kept some voters in town by providing work; others stayed for the saloons. Through this strategy, Belle Fourche won the election for the county seat. In celebration, a group of cowboys rode to Minnesela and stole the county books. The Belle Fourche sheriff returned the books until an official transfer could be made. By 1901, Minnesela was a ghost town.

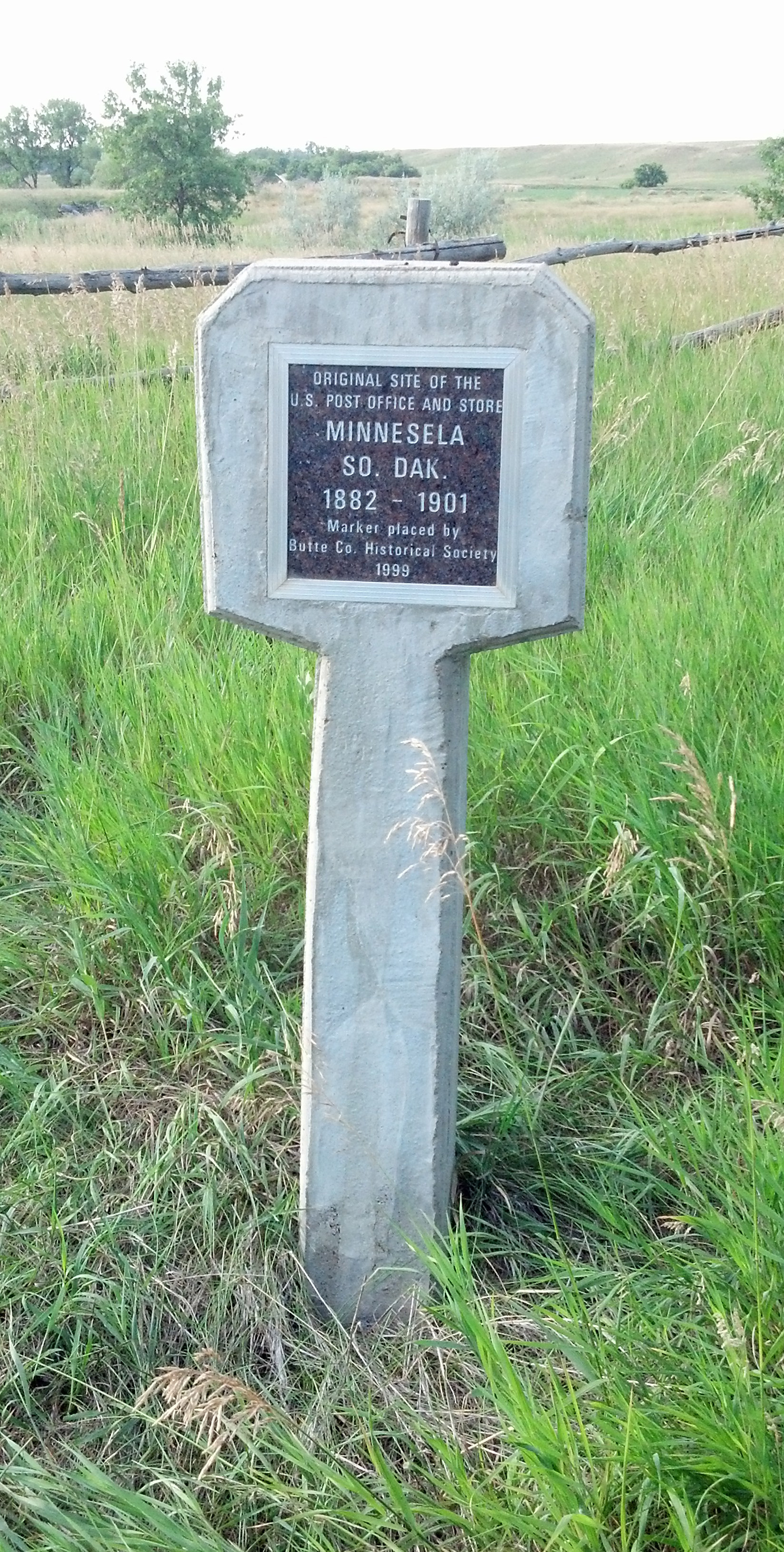
Historic marker at the site of the post office and store

=== Later history and today ===
In 1957, the town's flour mill was torn down. In 1960, Spaulding's cabin was donated to the Tri-State Museum in Belle Fourche. The house was then remodeled by the Lions Club, and in 2006, the house was moved to the Tri-State Museum. The house was again remodeled in the spring of 2007, and the cabin opened to the public on June 14, 2007.

The Minnesela Hotel is the only building still standing. The townsite is now a small farming community just outside Belle Fourche. In 1999, a sign was placed by the Butte County Historical Society on the former spot of the Minneselan post office and store.

== Geography ==
Minnesela was located on the Great Plains, approximately 3 miles (4.8 km) southeast of Belle Fourche, South Dakota and about 10 miles (16 km) north of the Black Hills. The town was located on the banks of the Lower Redwater River, over which the Minnesela Bridge crosses.

== See also ==
- List of ghost towns in South Dakota
