= Sol Star =

American politician

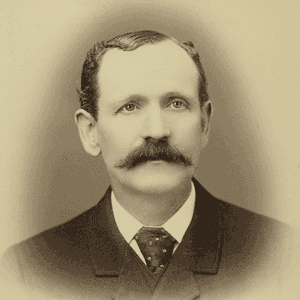

Member of the South Dakota Senate from the 31st district
- In office 1890–1894

Member of the South Dakota House of Representatives from the 31st district
- In office 1888–1890

Mayor of Deadwood, South Dakota
- In office 1884–1898

Personal details
- Born: December 20, 1840 Bavaria, German Confederation
- Died: October 10, 1917 (aged 76) Deadwood, South Dakota, U.S.
- Party: Republican

Solomon Star (December 20, 1840 – October 10, 1917) was an American businessman and politician notable as an early resident of the town of Deadwood, South Dakota.

== Life and career ==
Star was born in Bavaria, Germany, to Jewish parents. When he was 10 years of age, his family moved to Chillicothe, Ohio. A well documented family tree on Ancestry says his last name, prior to arriving in America, may have been Stern. He later moved to Helena, Montana, where he served as territorial auditor and personal secretary to the governor. He partnered with Seth Bullock in a hardware store; in July 1876, attracted to Deadwood by the promise of a great deal of business stemming from the gold rush they arrived in Deadwood on August 3, 1876, the day after Wild Bill Hickok was killed. They purchased a lot there from Al Swearengen and Henry Beaman and opened the Office of Star and Bullock, Auctioneers and Commission Merchants. They later partnered in livestock ranching as the S&B Ranch Company, and with Harris Franklin in the Deadwood Flouring Mill, in 1880, where Star was the general manager. The duo expanded their business interests to the towns of Spearfish, Sturgis, and Custer.

Bullock and Star contributed further to the economic development of the region by convincing the Fremont, Elkhorn, and Missouri Valley Railroad to build a track, by offering them 40 acres (162,000 m^{2}) of free right-of-way across their land when a speculator purchased the right of way to Minnesela and demanded a high price from the railroad. The railroad built a station three miles northwest of Minnesela, South Dakota, in 1890, and Bullock and Star were instrumental in founding the town of Belle Fourche there, offering free lots to anyone moving from Minnesela. Belle Fourche became the largest railhead for livestock in the United States and stole the county seat away from a declining Minnesela.

Bullock and Star's hardware store in Deadwood burned down in 1894. Rather than rebuild, they built Deadwood's first hotel on the site, a three-story, 64-room luxury hotel with steam heat and indoor bathrooms on each floor, at a cost of $40,000. The Bullock Hotel continues to operate to this day, now incorporating a 24-hour casino.

Star was elected to the first town council in 1876, became town postmaster in 1877, was elected mayor in 1884, and served ten terms for a total of 14 years. He later served as a Republican legislator after statehood in the South Dakota House of Representatives in 1889–1890 and in the South Dakota State Senate in 1893–1894 serving as President Pro Tempore of the South Dakota Senate, and as Lawrence County Clerk of Courts for 20 years, until his death. He was never married.

After a reportedly lavish funeral in Deadwood, Star was not buried in Mount Moriah Cemetery in Deadwood. Instead, his family had his body transported to St. Louis, Missouri, where he was laid to rest in New Mount Sinai Cemetery.

== In popular culture ==
Star was portrayed by John Hawkes in the television series Deadwood (2004–2006). The show's producers switched the character's birthplace to Vienna instead of Bavaria. Hawkes reprised his role in the television film Deadwood: The Movie (2019), set a decade after the events of season 3.
