= Old Style Saloon No. 10 =

Coordinates: 44.386011°N 103.718824°W

Present Day Saloon No.10
- Interactive map of the Present Day Saloon No.10 area

General information
- Architectural style: Old West
- Location: Deadwood, South Dakota, South Dakota, United States
- Opened: c.1876

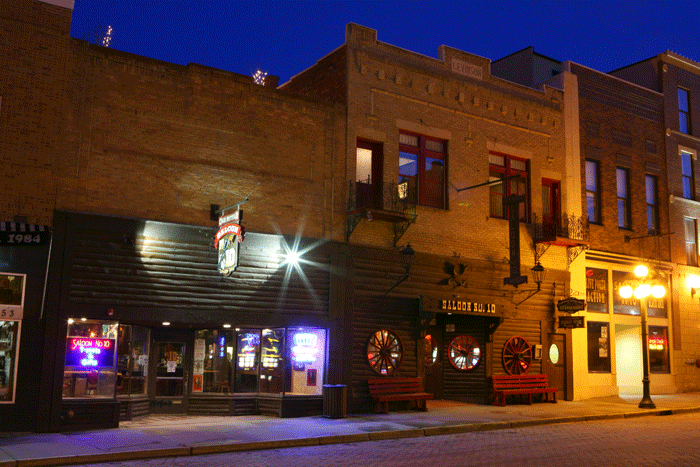
Old Style Saloon No. 10

The Old Style Saloon No. 10 is located in Deadwood, South Dakota, United States. The original location is best known as the site where the American Old West legend Wild Bill Hickok was assassinated by the Coward Jack McCall while playing a game of poker on August 2, 1876. Saloon No. 10 was originally located on placer claim number 10 from which its name is derived. Fire swept through the mining camp in 1879 destroying the original structure, and a bar was later built at its former location.

== Murder of Wild Bill Hickok ==
On the afternoon of August 2, 1876 Wild Bill wandered into Saloon No. 10 for a game of poker. The only chair left at the game was one which would place Wild Bill's back to the door, something he was uneasy with doing. Jack McCall entered the Saloon shortly after. He and Wild Bill exchanged greetings. McCall walked around the table stopping to check each player’s hand. Finally positioning himself behind Wild Bill, he pulled out his pistol and shot Wild Bill in the back of the head exclaiming, “Take that damn you". Wild Bill fell forward and let his hand fall to the table, black aces and eights and the nine of diamonds which would come to be known as the Deadman's Hand. The Saloon still stages a re-enactment of the shooting during the summer months.

== Notable patrons ==
The Saloon was frequented by many American Old West characters including: Wild Bill Hickok, Calamity Jane, Colorado Charlie Utter, Texas Jack, California Joe, Buffalo Bill Cody, Doc Holliday, Poker Alice, Wyatt Earp & Potato Creek Johnny.
