= John J. Manning =

American frontiersman

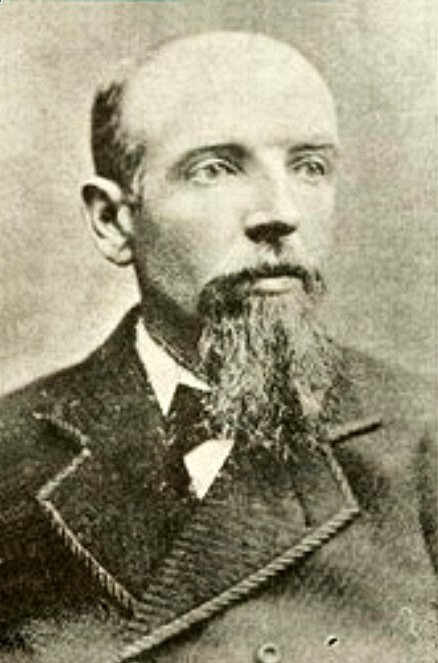
- Born: February 2, 1842; Kilkenny County, Ireland
- Died: September 13, 1911 (aged 69); Deadwood, South Dakota
- Burial place: St. Ambrose Cemetery, Deadwood, South Dakota
- Citizenship: United States of America
- Occupations: frontiersman, lawman, gold prospector, rancher, and saloon owner
- Political party: Democrat
- Spouse: Frankie Scott m. August 28, 1877
- Children: 2
- Parent(s): James & Julia Manning

John J. Manning (February 2, 1842 – September 13, 1911) was an Irish American frontiersman, lawman, gold prospector, rancher and saloon owner in the American West during the latter part of the 19th century. He was a prominent citizen in Deadwood, South Dakota from his arrival in 1876 to his death. Manning was the first elected sheriff of Lawrence County, Dakota Territory which included Deadwood. He served several terms as sheriff, as well as operated saloons, several livery stables, and a cattle & horse ranch in nearby Belle Fourche in South Dakota.

== Early life ==
John J. Manning was born in County Kilkenny, Ireland on February 2, 1842, to parents James & Julia Manning. In 1847, the Manning family immigrated to the United States, and quickly settled in Highland, Iowa County, Wisconsin. John spent his adolescent years in Highland with his parents and older brother Thomas and a younger sister Mary. During that time, John's father was engaged in farming. John remained in Highland until 1860, and shortly thereafter headed West, initially to Colorado, and then Idaho, Montana, Dakota and Alaska.

== Montana Territory ==
John Manning remained in Highland, Wisconsin until 1860, and then headed West to Colorado at the time of the gold rush around Pikes Peak. When gold was discovered in Montana, Manning headed North into Montana Territory & later into what is now Idaho, and eventually settling for a time in Beartown, Montana. Beartown, located at that time in Deer Lodge County, Montana, was, for a time in the late 1860s & early 1870s, the site of a major gold rush, attracting upwards of 5,000 prospectors, who often were referred to as the "Beartown toughs". During his time in Deer Lodge County, he served as Deputy Sheriff for the county, covering an area stretching from the Idaho border to the Canadian border. While living in Deer Lodge County, Manning was known for his interest in horse racing, and could often be seen with one of his racehorses at Olin's Racetrack in Deer Lodge Montana.

In 1874 John Manning moved from Beartown to the new town of Carroll, Montana, where he built a cabin. Also known as Fort Carroll, and Carroll Landing Post, it was located on the Missouri River, and was established by the Diamond R Transportation Company as a transportation and trading post.

== Dakota Territory ==
When gold was discovered in the Black Hills of Dakota Territory, John Manning was one of the early arrivals to the mining town in Dakota Territory that would eventually be known as Deadwood. Within a few days of his August 1876 arrival, Manning constructed and opened one of the first saloons in Deadwood, named the Senate Saloon, with partner John Mahan. At the Senate Saloon, Manning was known to have dealt cards to Wild Bill Hickok shortly before being shot and killed by Jack McCall. According to McCall, Wild Bill's killer, he was paid money by George Varnes to kill Hickok. McCall said that Hickok and Varnes were involved in a dispute at John Manning's Senate Saloon a few days earlier, and Varnes paid McCall to get revenge. When the residents of Deadwood organized the community's first fire department (Hook & Ladder Co. No. 1), Manning was elected to serve as foreman.

On August 28, 1877, John Manning married Miss Frankie Scott in a Catholic ceremony in Deadwood. The two had first met a few years earlier when they both resided in Deer Lodge County, Montana. The wedding was held at the Sahler House in Deadwood, and was followed by a procession of friends that joined in the celebration, accompanied by the brass band from the Bella Union Theatre.

John and his wife Frankie had two children, Francis, and Mary Ethel both born in Deadwood.

A few weeks following his wedding (October 16, 1877), the Democratic party of Lawrence County (of which Deadwood was the principal town), nominated John Manning as their candidate for sheriff in the county's first election. The local Republican party nominated Seth Bullock as their candidate for sheriff, who had been serving in that capacity for several months as a result of being appointed by the Governor of Dakota Territory, until such time as elections could be held.

In the November 1877 election, John Manning defeated Seth Bullock (who was appointed to the position by the Governor), and thus became the first elected sheriff of Lawrence County of which Deadwood was a part. Manning's win in 1877 was for a term of one year, and in November 1878, he was re-elected to the position for a term of two years, defeating Seth Bullock, the Republican candidate, for the second time. In 1882, Manning ran again for the sheriff's job, and was elected for a 2-year term.

In 1878, in his first term as Sheriff, Manning arrested William Bell for the murder of Charley Lee, who was robbed and killed for a few dollars and a gold watch. When an angry crowd of Deadwood citizens marched on the jail, threatening to take the law into their own hands, Sheriff Manning promptly surrounded the prisoner Bell and the jail with well-armed deputies, thereby stopping a crowd from lynching Bell. In that same year, the county commissioners instructed Sheriff Manning to take procession of the official books and records of the County Treasurer George Brigham, as he was suspected of fraud and embezzlement. County Treasurer refused to turnover the records, nor would he reveal the combination to the safe. Sheriff Manning, with gun drawn and pointed at the head of Brigham, successfully took procession of the official records, and arrested Treasurer Brigham.

In the second month of his first term, Manning successfully tracked down and arrested a notorious road agent named George Healy, who had been robbing stagecoaches along the Cheyenne Route between Deadwood and Cheyenne, Wyoming. Healy, who was wanted for murder and stage coach robbery, was captured by Manning in a Deadwood saloon, after tracking him as he moved throughout the city.

Under Manning's tenure as sheriff, the local Deadwood jail was popularly known as the "Hotel de Manning", and became the temporary home for road agents, horse thieves, killers, con artists, and any number of drunks. Since the streets of Deadwood were often covered in deep mud, and difficult to travel, Sheriff Manning utilized his jail prisoners as a chain-gang working to improve the streets.

In addition to his duties as sheriff, John Manning maintained a horse & cattle ranch at Belle Fourche, Dakota Territory, about 27 miles north of Deadwood. Although Manning was sheriff, it did not make him immune to crime, as his ranch suffered from several instances of horses and cattle being stolen by both Indians and non-Indians. One such instance happened in the fall of 1881, when Brave Bear, a notorious Sioux suspected of several murders, and the son-in-law to Sioux Chief Sitting Bull, attempted to steal horses from Manning's ranch. The attempt to steal a horse was unsuccessful, and Manning, with assistance from two nearby neighbors pursued Brave Bear on horseback, and eventually captured him at gunpoint. Brave Bear was turned over to authorities, convicted of murder the following year, and was hanged.

When gold was discovered in 1884 on the North Fork of the Coeur d'Alene River in Idaho, John Manning was quick to travel to this new gold rush. When the amount of gold proved disappointing, Manning returned to Deadwood.

In 1897, John Manning, who was no longer serving as sheriff, again played a pivotal role in stopping a group of Deadwood vigilantes that were determined to hang Charles Brown for the murder of Emma Stone. When the sheriff and chief of police attempted to bring Charles Brown to jail to stand trial, they were met by a large group of over 200 angry citizens calling for the immediate lynching of Brown. The crowd was yelling "Hang him" & "Get a rope". The police chief, needing help getting the prisoner safely to jail, deputized John Manning to provide protection. With guns drawn, Manning and other police officers were able to safely bring the prisoner to jail and protect him from the lynch mob.

In the early years of Deadwood, John Wallace Crawford, known as the "Poet Scout", became acquainted with John Manning and penned the following poem about the man he knew:

Good bye you brave old pioneer,
There never breathed a truer friend
Than honest Johnny none more dear
Where honesty and justice blend
We knew you on the wild frontier
When savage foe and outlaws too
Were curbed and cowed in abject fear
Because to duty you were true
We knew you when your cabin door
Was open wide to those in need
And bounteously from out your store
You gave that hungry men might feed
Ah Johnny Manning friend of mine
You'll die as poor as Job's old fowl
But on the heavenly range you'll shine
While devil broncho busters howl

Decades later, Manning & John Crawford were reunited when they were part of a committee to organize the first Fourth of July celebration in Dawson City, Yukon Territory, Canada.

== Later life and death ==
In 1897, when gold was discovered in the Klondike (Yukon Territory, Canada), John Manning was one of the early arrivals in Dawson City. In Dawson, Manning was owner of the Northern Saloon, and for a while, was a partner in the Pavilion Saloon, and the Monte Carlo Saloon & Dance Hall, all located in Dawson. Over the next five years, Manning spent several months each year in the goldfields of Klondike & Alaska, as owner/manager of several saloons, and was an active gold prospector.

In 1898, Manning was in Seattle, waiting to board a steamer that would take him to Alaska, when he was accosted by a person demanding meal money. Manning gave the man 50 cents, but then followed him to make sure the money was used for food. When the man entered a saloon and ordered three beers, Manning entered the saloon and poured out the beers. Exiting the saloon, Manning was met by the same man, who was pointing a pistol at Manning, and heard the demand "Raise your hands." Manning threw up his left hand, and at the same time, used his right hand to draw his pistol, pointing it directly at the thief. Realizing that he had picked the wrong man to rob, the thief began to apologize, but Manning used his pistol to hit the man on the head, knocking him unconscious. Manning then dragged the thief to a doctor who put eleven stitches into his scalp. Later, Manning boarded the steamer and departed for Alaska.

By 1905, Manning had permanently returned to Deadwood, where he resided until his death on September 13, 1911. Known by his family, friends & acquaintances as "Johnny", he was the first foreman of the Deadwood Pioneer Hook & Ladder Company & continued to take an active interest in the organization. And, he was one of the first members of the Society of Black Hills Pioneers and continued to be active in the organization until his death.

Manning is buried at St. Ambrose Cemetery in Deadwood, South Dakota.
