= Lucretia Marchbanks =

American slave and entrepreneur

Lucretia Marshbanks
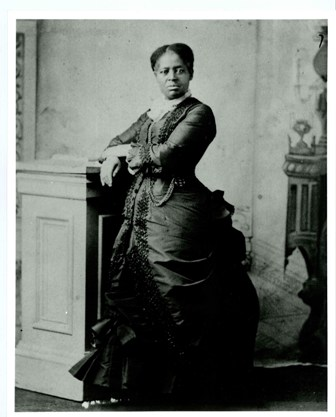
- Born: March 25, 1832; Putnam County, Tennessee, US
- Died: November 22, 1911 (aged 79); Beulah, Wyoming, US
- Burial place: Beulah Cemetery
- Other name: Aunt Lou
- Occupations: Entrepreneur, Cook

Lucretia Marshbanks, also known as "Aunt Lou" (March 25, 1832 – November 22, 1911) was an American slave, cook, and entrepreneur. She is considered one of the first black women in the Black Hills of South Dakota.

== Early life ==
Lucretia Marshbanks was born enslaved on March 25, 1832, in Putnam County, Tennessee. She was the eldest of eleven children and her parents were Mary and Edmund Marshbanks. She belonged to a slave owner named Martin Marshbanks. Her father was born as the illegitimate son of a slave and her owner, was the half-brother of Martin Marshbanks.

When Marshbanks was 17, she and her brother, William, became the property of her cousin, Anne Marshbanks, who was the youngest daughter of Martin. They then traveled west to Siskiyou County, California with their new slave owner. There, Lucretia and William grew up on the plantation where they were trained in cooking and housekeeping. After a few years, they are returned to Tennessee where they lived with Martin Marshbanks.

In 1865, Lucretia was liberated by the Thirteenth Amendment. She initially stayed with the family before traveling to Colorado where she worked the gold mining camps. Not long after, Lucretia returned to Tennessee.

== Career ==
While in Tennessee, Lucretia heard reports about there being gold deposits in the Black Hills in Dakota territory. She joined the "Black Hills Gold Rush" and arrived in historic Deadwood Gulch, a mining camp, on June 1, 1876. Securing a job, Lucretia worked as a kitchen manager in the Grand Central Hotel. It was here that people caught word of her cooking and the hotel was becoming more well known for Lucretia's cooking. She was soon known by all as "Aunt Lou". Except for “Aunt Sally” Campbell, who came with the George Armstrong Custer Black Hills Expedition in 1874, most believe that Lucretia Marshbanks was the first black woman to live in the Black Hills of the Dakota Territory.

Her fame grew following a fundraising contest for the construction of a Congregational church on August 15, 1879, in which a diamond ring was raffled off to the most popular woman in the Black Hills. More than 1300 votes for 50 cents each were cast. Miners and mine officials alike voted for Aunt Lou, who won by a large margin of 652 votes and went on to win the prize.

Two years later, she was offered a better job as a cook at the Golden Gate Mine nearby. With her culinary skills spreading quickly, she was soon hired as a cook and housekeeper for Harry Gregg's boarding house in Sawpit Gulch and Lead. It wasn't long before Lucretia used her money she saved up and purchased and opened her own hotel, the Rustic Hotel at Sawpit Gulch in 1883. The hotel was seen more as a boarding house with its friendly atmosphere, and it was quickly overrun with customers. She was also considered to be a nurse to many people during her time of owning her hotel. After a while, Lucretia bought a ranch near Rocky Ford, Wyoming west of the Black Hills in June 1885 where she dedicated her time there to horse and cattle breeding.

In 1887, Lucretia sold her establishment to her sister, Mattie, and permanently stayed at her ranch. Later, Marchbanks enlarged her ranch by purchasing and taking advantage of the Homestead Act, claiming an additional 80 acres, so that she was awarded a total of 240 acres. After she retired, she occasionally cooked at a coffee shop in Beulah, Wyoming, and at Guidinger's Hotel in the same town.

== Death ==
In the early 1900s, Lucretia's health began to fail. Physicians did all they could to help Lucretia. There were suggestions of urinary-tract issues and another suggestion of kidney problems. In the beginning of 1907, there had been many tests on Marshbanks including numerous urinalyses. She held out for a few more years before dying on November 22, 1911, at the age of 79. At her death her estate was valued at $3,000.

== Films ==
- In the television series, Deadwood, Marchbanks is portrayed by actress Cleo King.
