= Jack McCall =

Murderer of Wild Bill Hickok

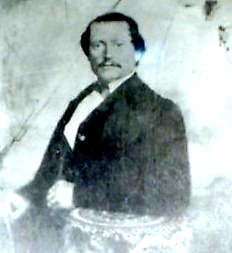
- Born: John McCall; 1852 or 1853; Jefferson County, Kentucky
- Died: March 1, 1877 (aged 24); Yankton, Dakota Territory
- Cause of death: Execution by hanging
- Other names: Crooked Nose Jack; Broken Nose Jack
- Known for: Murder of Wild Bill Hickok

John McCall (/məˈkɔːl/) (1852/1853 – March 1, 1877), also known as "Crooked Nose" or "Broken Nose Jack", was the murderer of Old West legend Wild Bill Hickok. McCall shot Hickok from behind as he played poker at Nuttal & Mann's Saloon in Deadwood, Dakota Territory, on August 2, 1876. McCall was executed for the murder on March 1, 1877.

== Early life ==
Many details of McCall's life are unknown. He was most likely born in the early 1850s in Jefferson County, Kentucky to Mary F. Lyons and James Clayton McCall. McCall was raised in Kentucky with three sisters and eventually drifted west to become a buffalo hunter. By 1876, he was living in a gold mining camp outside Deadwood, under the alias "Bill Sutherland".

== Murder of Hickok ==
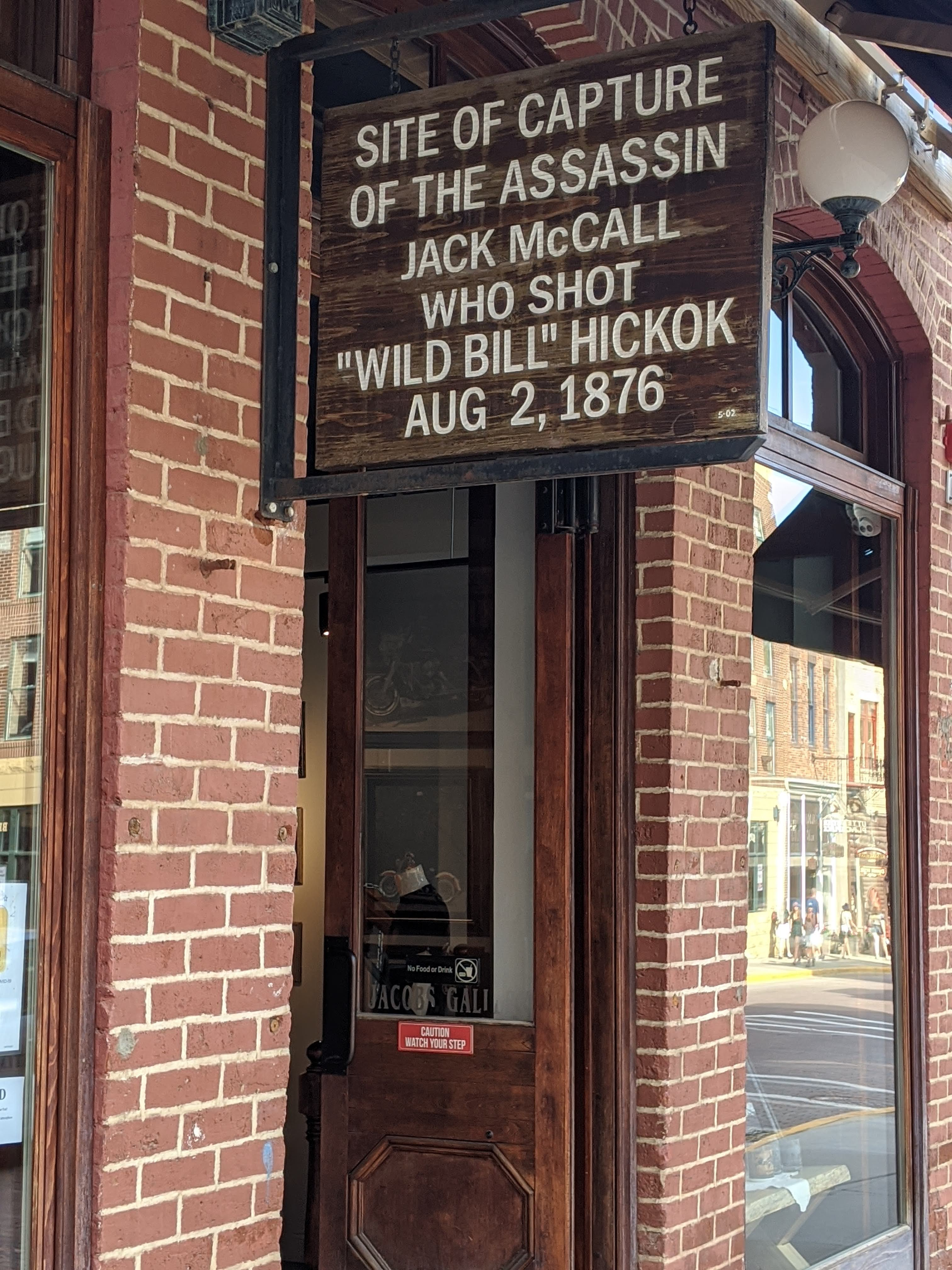
A historical marker at the location of McCall's capture is on Main Street of Deadwood, South Dakota

McCall was intoxicated while drinking alcohol at Nuttal & Mann's saloon in Deadwood, Dakota Territory, on August 1, 1876, when one of the players dropped out of a poker game that included "Wild Bill" Hickok. The inebriated McCall quickly took his place. McCall proceeded to lose several hands, and was soon out of money. Hickok offered McCall money to buy breakfast and advised him not to play again until he could cover his losses. Though McCall accepted the money, he reportedly felt insulted.

The following day on August 2, 1876, another poker game was taking place at the saloon. On this particular evening, Hickok had his back to the door, in contrast to his normal practice of sitting in a corner to protect his back. Among the players at the table (sitting in the corner) was Charles Rich, who refused Hickok's request to switch seats. Hickok reluctantly took the empty seat and joined the game, which was a fatal mistake.

A drunken McCall entered the saloon, and ordered a drink from the bar. He proceeded to move down the bar, and stopped a few steps behind Hickok, as if to look at the hand he had been dealt. Not noticing McCall, Hickok said to another player, "The old duffer. He broke me on the hand," his final words. McCall shot Hickok in the back of the head with a single-action .45-caliber revolver, shouting "Damn you! Take that!" Hickok died instantly. McCall ran out the back door of the saloon and tried to make his escape on a horse, but the saddle was loose, causing McCall to fall off. He was apprehended by several men shortly after.

== First trial ==
An impromptu court was called to order with the prosecution, defense, and jury made up of local miners and businessmen. Contemporary newspaper accounts reported that Joseph Miller, a local attorney identified as "Judge Miller," was appointed by the court to defend McCall during the proceedings. On trial the next day in McDaniel's Theater, McCall claimed his actions were in retribution for Hickok having previously killed his brother in Abilene, Kansas. McCall was found not guilty after two hours. The verdict brought the Black Hills Pioneer to editorialize: "Should it ever be our misfortune to kill a man... we would simply ask that our trial may take place in some of the mining camps of these hills."

== Second trial and execution ==
Fearing for his safety, McCall soon left the area and headed into Wyoming Territory, where he repeatedly bragged at local saloons about killing Hickok in a "fair" gunfight. But Wyoming authorities refused to recognize the result of McCall's acquittal on the grounds that the court in Deadwood had no legal jurisdiction. Because Deadwood was not under a legally constituted law enforcement or court system, officials argued that McCall could be tried for murder again. Agreeing, the federal court in Yankton, Dakota Territory, declared that double jeopardy did not apply, and set a date for a retrial.

The trial began on December 4, 1876. No witnesses were called for the defense, and the guilty verdict came in at 10:15 p.m. on December 6. McCall stated that he had been heavily intoxicated at the time of the murder and did not remember any details of the event. He requested a new trial, as well as claimed that his name was not really Jack McCall, and that he had changed it when he left home as a child. Judge Granville Bennett did not believe his story and sentenced McCall to death by hanging.

At 10:15 a.m. on March 1, 1877, McCall was hanged in a public execution in Yankton, at age 24.

== Aftermath and legacy ==
McCall was buried in Sacred Heart Cemetery in Yankton County, South Dakota, a cemetery which was moved in 1881. When McCall's body was exhumed, it was found to have the noose still around his neck. McCall was the first person to be executed by federal officials in the Dakota Territory.

The killing of Hickok and the capture of McCall is reenacted every summer evening (except Sundays) at the Masonic Temple in Deadwood.

== Portrayals ==
McCall has been played by:

- Porter Hall in the film The Plainsman (1936)
- Lon Chaney Jr. in the film Badlands of Dakota (1941)
- George Montgomery in the film Jack McCall, Desperado (1953)
- David Arquette in the film Wild Bill (1995)
- John Pyper-Ferguson in the 1995 television series Legend
- Garret Dillahunt in the 2004 HBO television series Deadwood

== See also ==
- Capital punishment in South Dakota
- Capital punishment in the United States
- List of people executed in South Dakota (pre-1972)
