= List of Deadwood episodes =

Deadwood, a Western drama television series created by David Milch, premiered on the premium television channel HBO in the United States on March 21, 2004, and ended on August 27, 2006. The series consists of a total of 36 episodes over three 12-episode seasons; the episodes are approximately 55 minutes. A film continuation premiered on May 31, 2019.

== Series overview ==
Season	Episodes	Originally released	
Season	Episodes	First released	Last released
1	12	March 21, 2004	June 13, 2004
2	12	March 6, 2005	May 22, 2005
3	12	June 11, 2006	August 27, 2006
Film		May 31, 2019	

== Episodes ==
Series creator and executive producer David Milch is explicitly credited with writing five of the show's 36 episodes; however, he did contribute significantly to the writing of almost every episode, frequently completely re-writing episode drafts written by other writers. The credited writer for any given episode is usually one of Milch's staff writers who helped him develop storylines.

=== Season 1 (2004) ===
No. overall	No. in season	Title	Directed by	Written by	Original release date	U.S. viewers (millions)
1	1	"Deadwood"	Walter Hill	David Milch	March 21, 2004	5.79
In 1876, former marshal Seth Bullock arrives in the gold mining camp of Deadwood, South Dakota to open a hardware store with his business partner Sol Star. The owner of their land plot and manager of saloon/brothel the Gem, Al Swearengen, schemes to jack up the price of a dry gold placer claim and sell it to wealthy Brom Garret. He makes his henchman Dan Dority kill a conspirator when he deviates from the plan. The Metz family is supposedly killed by Sioux while leaving Deadwood. Bullock and ex-soldier James "Wild Bill" Hickok lead a party and find the surviving daughter Sofia badly wounded. Bullock and Hickok confront one of Al's men who they believe robbed and killed the family, who they kill when he draws a gun.
2	2	"Deep Water"	Davis Guggenheim	Malcolm MacRury	March 28, 2004	4.88
Sofia heals under the watch of Amos "Doc" Cochran and Hickok's friend "Calamity" Jane, leaving Al worried that she could identify the real killers. He muscles past Jane and observes that Sofia has woken up, but leaves her alive. He orders the dead man's brother to kill Hickok, but Hickok easily kills him. Noticing Bullock working with him, Al tries to block his and Sol's ability to buy their lot. He kills the remaining Metz murderer and sends Dan to kill Sofia, but Doc protects her while Jane and Hickok's friend Charlie Utter take her into the hills.
3	3	"Reconnoitering the Rim"	Davis Guggenheim	Jody Worth	April 4, 2004	N/A
With the killers dead, Al allows Sofia a safe return to Deadwood. Cy Tolliver comes to town and opens the Bella Union saloon, the quality of which trumps the Gem. After establishing some conditions, Al allows Sol and Bullock to buy their land. Unable to get his money back from Al, Garret threatens to call the Pinkertons, so Al orders him killed. Dan takes him to his claim and kills him with a rock, unaware that neighboring prospector Whitney Ellsworth has noticed them. He reports to Al that he found a vein of gold in the claim.
4	4	"Here Was a Man"	Alan Taylor	Elizabeth Sarnoff	April 11, 2004	5.40
Jack McCall loses all his money to Hickok in an overnight poker game; Hickok gives McCall money for breakfast, which he perceives as a humiliation. Garret's widow Alma suspects he was murdered, while Al orders Grand Central hotel manager E. B. Farnum to buy the Garret claim. Alma asks Hickok for help, so he takes a bribe from Al that he uses to pay Bullock to investigate. Ellsworth admits to Dan that he saw him kill Garret but promises to keep quiet. Tolliver's friend Andy Cramed comes to town but falls ill with smallpox. McCall kills Hickok, and a resident rides into town with a decapitated Native American's head.
5	5	"The Trial of Jack McCall"	Ed Bianchi	John Belluso	April 18, 2004	4.56
At McCall's trial, his lawyer fabricates a story about Hickok killing his brother and the murder being justified revenge. Concerned that the trial will interfere with the possibility of Deadwood's annexation, Al presses the judge to declare McCall innocent. Alma gives Bullock legal guardianship of her claim and begins taking care of Sofia. Knowing of her laudanum addiction, Al tries to sabotage her by having his favorite prostitute Trixie slip her opium, but she cannot bring herself to do it. Tolliver has Cramed dumped in the woods to die as his condition worsens. Jane, having turned to alcohol after Hickok's death, finds him and tries to nurse him back to health. Reverend H.W. Smith has a seizure. Al ushers McCall out of town as Bullock pursues him.
6	6	"Plague"	Davis Guggenheim	Malcolm MacRury	April 25, 2004	N/A
Bullock is attacked by a Native and kills him in a brutal struggle. Utter finds him and explains that the man was taking vengeance for his decapitated and defiled comrade, so they bury the body. E.B. realizes that Alma is not drugged, so Trixie asks her to fake it when Al confronts her. Cramed's smallpox spreads, and Deadwood's proprietors agree to pool their money and hire riders to get the vaccine from Fort Kearny, Nebraska. Al commandeers local paper The Deadwood Pioneer to suppress news and keep panic to a minimum.
7	7	"Bullock Returns to the Camp"	Michael Engler	Jody Worth	May 2, 2004	4.29
Utter and Bullock detain McCall and hand him over to federal authorities. Siblings Miles and Flora Anderson arrive in Deadwood, the former sweeping floors at the Gem and the latter working under the Bella Union's bisexual madam Joanie Stubbs, who quickly falls for her. The siblings secretly plot to rob both saloons. Observing Alma leaving for Garret's funeral, Al suspects she is sober. Bullock witnesses E.B. trying to buy the claim from her. Hardened by his pursuit of McCall, he confronts Al and warns him to buy it fairly. Cramed recovers from his illness and leaves town. Alma offers to help Trixie leave Deadwood with her and Sofia, but she assumes she is being belittled for her lower class and turns her down.
8	8	"Suffer the Little Children"	Dan Minahan	Elizabeth Sarnoff	May 9, 2004	3.88
The riders return with the vaccine and deliver news that South Dakota is writing a treaty with the Natives, which will annex Deadwood. Alma reaches a price with E.B., but Bullock demands the claim be appraised. Al hires Ellsworth, who discovers that the claim is plentiful. Bullock urges Alma not to sell while he and Al agree to cooperate on Deadwood's annexation. As Tolliver suspects Flora's deception, she steals from Joanie and flees. Tolliver and his men capture her and Miles, killing him and forcing Joanie to kill Flora. Trixie attempts suicide and Alma decides to stay in the camp, giving her a gold nugget to finance her leaving town if she wants. She returns to the Gem and gives it to Al.
9	9	"No Other Sons or Daughters"	Ed Bianchi	George Putnam	May 16, 2004	4.35
Al bribes magistrate Claggett to hurry Deadwood's annexation, who tells him to put together a government and warns him of a murder warrant out on him. E.B. elects himself as mayor, Utter is made fire commissioner, and Bullock avoids being made sheriff. A Grand Central employee discovers a letter Hickok wrote to his wife and E.B. takes it. Smith's seizures worsen and his mental state erodes, refusing to accept medicine because of his belief that his condition is God's will. Joanie leaves the Bella Union, Utter opens a post office, and Jane decides to leave Deadwood. Bullock introduces Ellsworth to Alma and later meets with her privately, where she is saddened to learn that he has a wife, Martha. He mentions that his stepson William's father is actually his brother, who was killed during wartime.
10	10	"Mister Wu"	Dan Minahan	Bryan McDonald	May 23, 2004	N/A
Chinese opium smuggler Wu reports to Al that two white men killed his man and stole the product. Claggett's man Silas Adams demands money from Al to drop the warrant. Al kicks Smith out of the Gem, so he goes to Sol and Bullock, who show him kindness and offer to walk with him. Wanting her new brothel to be independent of Tolliver, Joanie asks Bella Union poker dealer Eddie Sawyer to help steal from him. Al's henchman admits that he and Tolliver's man Leon robbed Wu's man to feed their addictions. Al makes the thieves draw straws for their lives and kills his man to appease Wu, revealing to Adams that he rigged it so Leon would survive and avoid him a feud with Tolliver.
11	11	"Jewel's Boot Is Made for Walking"	Steve Shill	Ricky Jay	June 6, 2004	4.26
Jewel Caulfield, the Gem's disabled cleaning lady, asks Doc to fit her bad leg with a brace. As Ellsworth finishes appraising the claim, Alma's father Otis Russell comes to Deadwood, warning her that Garret's relatives suspect she set him up to be killed. Al hires Adams to kill Claggett. Utter threatens to shut down Tom Nuttall's No. 10 Saloon over fire safety violations, so he backs Tolliver's man Con Stapleton for sheriff to bypass him. Tolliver orders Leon to stir up racial outrage over Al killing a man for Wu. Eddie steals from the Bella Union. Trixie and Sol develop a mutual attraction and have sex, which Al still forces him to pay for. As punishment, he makes Trixie sleep with the other women and spends the night with a different one.
12	12	"Sold Under Sin"	Davis Guggenheim	Ted Mann	June 13, 2004	3.21
George Crook comes to Deadwood seeking men to join him against the Sioux and Cheyenne, but his men instead abandon him to gamble and search for gold. Doc gives Jewel a brace that allows for easier mobility. Russell demands that Alma give him the claim, threatening to implicate her for Garret's murder when Bullock confronts him. He brutalizes Russell and asks Crook to take him out of the camp. Con kills one of Wu's men, so Bullock takes his badge. He promises Alma he will protect her and they have sex. With Smith so degraded he can barely move, Al smothers him to put him out of his misery. Adams kills Claggett when he comes around to collect from Al. Bullock visits Al and declares himself sheriff. As he leaves, Al looks down on Doc and Jewel dancing. Trixie smiles up at him and he does not return it.

=== Season 2 (2005) ===
No. overall	No. in season	Title	Directed by	Written by	Original release date	U.S. viewers (millions)
13	1	"A Lie Agreed Upon (Part I)"	Ed Bianchi	David Milch	March 6, 2005	2.79
Seven months later, Bullock and Alma's relationship continues, while Al is infuriated to learn that John L. Pennington is trifurcating the Dakota Territory and appointing commissioners to each county. No. 10 bartender Harry Manning kills a man he mistakes for miscreant "Slippery" Dan. Al mocks Bullock for seemingly neglecting his duties in favor of Alma, and he removes his badge before fighting him. The fight sends them over the Gem's balcony, and Al is stopped from killing Bullock by the arrival of Martha and William. Joanie opens her brothel, the Chez Amis, after her friend and madam Maddie arrives in town. Bullock shows Martha and William to the house he had built for them, while the contents of a letter he wrote to the former are revealed to be a promise to be a good husband and father. He returns to Alma and embraces her.
14	2	"A Lie Agreed Upon (Part II)"	Ed Bianchi	Jody Worth	March 13, 2005	3.41
Doc notes Al's difficulty with urinating while tending to his wounds. Bullock tells Alma that they need to end their affair. Increasingly jealous of Adams, Dan gets in a fight with his man and Adams kills Slippery Dan when he heckles them. Al threatens Dan to break up the fight, convincing him that he likes Adams more. Bullock takes Utter and a returned Jane to get his gun and badge back, which Al returns after a tense standoff. He returns to his house to find that Martha has removed the bundling board he built into their bed.
15	3	"New Money"	Steve Shill	Elizabeth Sarnoff	March 20, 2005	N/A
Francis Wolcott, a geologist representing George Hearst's mining company, comes to Deadwood. E.B. tries to scam him by selling Hickok's letter, but immediately offers his services when Wolcott reveals he works for Hearst. Maddie, familiar with his sadism, orders his favorite prostitute Carrie to come to town. Alma ends the affair and fires Sofia's tutor Alice Isringhausen for her perceived judgement. Trixie asks Sol to teach her bookkeeping. Al goes into septic shock and Doc determines that he has kidney stones. Wolcott gets E.B. and Tolliver to spread rumors about the town's claims being invalid.
16	4	"Requiem for a Gleet"	Alan Taylor	Ted Mann	March 27, 2005	2.51
A local criminal annoys Dan for Al's help while he stands guard over him. Wanting to avoid surgery, Al has Doc loosen the stones with a urethral cleaning tool, allowing him to pass them manually. Dan kills the man when he returns and tries to force entry. Lawrence County commissioner Hugo Jarry, working for Hearst, arrives in Deadwood and gives Wolcott priority over Tolliver regarding claim purchases. Wolcott introduces Tolliver to Lee, a Chinese man who will work with him to expand his ventures. Isringhausen claims to Adams that Alma wants to kill her. Sol informs Bullock that their plans to open a bank require money that they do not have, and Bullock rejects his suggestion to ask Alma for collateral. Wolcott slams Doris, a Chez Amis prostitute that works for Tolliver, against a wall when she disobeys him during a session. Carrie arrives in town and he prematurely ejaculates while she sits on him.
17	5	"Complications" (formerly "Difficulties")	Gregg Fienberg	Victoria Morrow	April 3, 2005	2.17
Al recovers from his illness and Doc realizes he had a stroke. Doris tells Joanie about Wolcott's fetishes. Alma learns she is pregnant by Bullock. Isringhausen claims to Adams that Al was hired to kill Garret. Jarry presses Pioneer editor A.W. Merrick to publish a headline that scares claim owners into selling, which Tolliver buys before Wolcott can get to them. He sells Jarry out to the mob of miners led by racist Steve Fields, but Bullock rescues Jarry at Al's request. Black livery yard worker Samuel Fields is tarred while protecting Jarry and Bullock is forced to help ward them off.
18	6	"Something Very Expensive"	Steve Shill	Steve Shill	April 10, 2005	2.16
When Lee refuses Al's money, he deduces that he works for Hearst. Alma vomits after proposing the idea of opening a bank to Sol. Sol informs Bullock that she may be pregnant. Knowing someone needs to act as the father, Trixie encourages Ellsworth to marry Alma. Isringhausen offers to pay Al to testify against Alma. Tolliver reveals to Wolcott that he knows about his sexual practices, so he kills Doris, Maddie and Carrie. Livery manager Arnette Hostetler catches a drunken Steve molesting Bullock's horse out of spite, and he and Fields force him to write a confession to keep him away from them. Joanie sends the rest of her women away and shuts down the Chez Amis.
19	7	"E.B. Was Left Out"	Michael Almereyda	Jody Worth	April 17, 2005	2.38
Tolliver has Lee dispose of the women's bodies. Joanie tells Utter what happened, who picks a fight with and beats Wolcott. Wolcott informs him that he has Hickok's letter, luring him to a meeting where he hands it over and judges by Utter's attitude that he knows about the murders. Al warns Alma that Isringhausen is a Pinkerton agent and offers to help her if paid. E.B., having set up the meeting between them, obsesses over what was said after not being invited. Tolliver notices Joanie drinking at the Bella Union and offers her financial assistance, but she rejects him and intends to prostitute herself for money.
20	8	"Childish Things"	Tim Van Patten	Regina Corrado	April 24, 2005	2.42
Bullock refuses Al's request to contact a judge he knows in Montana and make the state governments fight over who annexes Deadwood. Al tells Merrick that Bullock "would not confirm" if he would talk to the judge. Wolcott buys up every claim in town save for Alma's and the Manuel brothers'. Al makes a deal with Isringhausen to have Dan arrested for killing Garret and then have him escape custody. Alma and Isringhausen have an encounter that inadvertently reveals that Alma knows her occupation. As Tom unwittingly distracts the town with his new bicycle, Mose Manuel kills his brother when he refuses to accept Wolcott's lucrative offer. Ellsworth proposes to Alma, but she asks for time to consider. Knowing Joanie is grieving, Utter has her meet Jane, who she explains the situation with Wolcott to. Uninterested in Lee's prostitutes, Wolcott wanders into the Chez Amis and is attacked by Joanie. Jane encounters him in the streets and asks if he is "the cocksucker," and he responds "I may as well be."
21	9	"Amalgamation and Capital"	Ed Bianchi	Elizabeth Sarnoff	May 1, 2005	2.16
Bullock and William bond over their brother/father. Merrick publishes numerous incorrect rumors in the Pioneer about annexation, confusing the town. Unable to stand Wolcott walking free and Tolliver covering for him, Utter leaves town. Joanie asks Jane to work at the Chez Amis as a guard. Isringhausen reports to her superiors that her cover is blown, so Al bribes and threatens her to sign Dan's confession and leave town. Mose tries to rob the Bella Union after losing at cards and is shot. Hostetler loses control of a horse he is trying to geld and it runs through the streets, trampling William.
22	10	"Advances, None Miraculous"	Dan Minahan	Sara Hess	May 8, 2005	N/A
Hostetler and Fields leave town, assuming they will be blamed for the accident due to their race. They agree to track down the runaway horse in hopes of making amends. Mose's life is saved by Doc. The rumors in the Pioneer caused Jarry to return, so Al has Sol help Adams fabricate a story about a wealthy Butte man that is trying to help the town get annexed. Jarry asks the town to hold out until Yankton makes a counter-offer. William dies of his injuries. Cramed, now a minister, returns to Deadwood and offers to pray for the Bullocks. Bullock accepts and invites him into their home.
23	11	"The Whores Can Come"	Gregg Fienberg	Bryan McDonald	May 15, 2005	2.02
Wu is enraged to discover Lee burning the bodies of his prostitutes and has to be restrained in the Gem to avoid killing him and starting conflict with Hearst. Martha prepares to leave town. As Wolcott receives news that Hearst is coming to Deadwood, he offers to buy the Grand Central from E.B. and is rejected. The majority of the town gathers for William's funeral and Martha retreats into the house, but eventually comes back out and rescinds her request that the funeral be closed casket, allowing the attendees to pay their respects to the body. Alma watches the way Ellsworth carries Sofia to bed and accepts his proposal.
24	12	"Boy-the-Earth-Talks-To"	Ed Bianchi	Ted Mann	May 22, 2005	2.42
As Hearst arrives in town, Wu and Lee kill each other's men. Al gets Hearst to agree to work with Wu if he supplies laborers. Dan, Adams, and Al's henchman Johnny Burns kill Lee's men while Wu sneaks up on Lee and kills him. Martha decides to stay in town to work as a schoolteacher. Hearst purchases the Grand Central but allows E.B. to keep managing it. Tolliver informs Hearst of Wolcott's crimes and he is fired. He then extorts Hearst for a share of the claims by claiming to have a confession letter from Wolcott. Cramed stabs him for mocking his new choice of employ. Jarry delivers Yankton's new offer and Al signs it, officially annexing Deadwood in South Dakota. Wolcott hangs himself as Alma and Ellsworth's wedding brings the town together in celebration. Al kicks Bullock out of the empty Gem and watches, smiling, as he walks through the crowd alone.

=== Season 3 (2006) ===
No. overall	No. in season	Title	Directed by	Written by	Original release date	U.S. viewers (millions)
25	1	"Tell Your God to Ready for Blood"	Mark Tinker	David Milch & Ted Mann	June 11, 2006	2.40
Six weeks later, Deadwood's posts go up for reelection and Hearst's thugs kill a miner at the Gem. Al theorizes that the man did it on Hearst's orders to test if Bullock will work for him. A pregnant Alma is struck with a sudden illness. At a meeting with Bullock regarding the election, Hearst snidely brings up Alma. Assuming E.B. told Hearst about their relationship, Bullock beats him. Ashamed at his loss of his control, he considers not running until Utter reminds him that the position will then go to Manning. When Hearst refuses to make it up to Al for staging the shooting at the Gem, Al postpones the upcoming election speeches.
26	2	"I Am Not the Fine Man You Take Me For"	Dan Attias	David Milch & Regina Corrado	June 18, 2006	1.90
Hearst's enforcer Joe Turner delivers a diagram that seems to predict men will come to the Gem. When they arrive, Al kills them and decides to set the debates that night. As Alma prepares for surgery to avoid a miscarriage, she makes out in her will that Sofia should inherit her properties and Bullock will remain their guardian, who promises to protect them if Hearst goes after them. The speeches are held, where Bullock easily beats out Manning. Cramed asks a recovering Tolliver for forgiveness, and he enters a supposed fit of religious psychosis that causes Cramed to flee. Hearst and Turner cut off Al's middle finger to force him to help get Alma's claim, though he continues to refuse them.
27	3	"True Colors"	Gregg Fienberg	Regina Corrado & Ted Mann	June 25, 2006	2.20
Al's friend Jack Langrishe arrives in town with his theater troupe, as well as Hearst's personal cook, Lou Marchbanks. As Alma's condition improves, Doc coughs up blood during a conversation. Bullock and Utter learn that Hearst's men are killing miners that try to unionize. When Hearst denies involvement, Bullock demands that Al relinquish the body of the miner killed in the Gem. Hearst shows Cy a letter from Wolcott that implicates Tolliver in helping to cover up Wolcott's crimes, using this to strong-arm Tolliver into working for him. Alma meets with Hearst to discuss a price for her claim, but it goes awry when a mistrustful Ellsworth erupts at him. At their second, private meeting, she offers a price but quickly becomes unsettled after Hearst violently rejects it. He considers raping her but lets her go. Al wonders to Langrishe why he hasn't plotted revenge against Hearst yet, and Langrishe posits that he cares about the town.
28	4	"Full Faith and Credit"	Ed Bianchi	Ted Mann	July 2, 2006	1.70
The bank opens, while Langrishe buys the Chez Amis, now a schoolhouse, from Joanie on the condition that he build a new one in its stead. Dan and Turner begin antagonizing each other. Hostetler and Fields return to town with the horse that killed William, and Bullock accepts the former's repentance. Having taken over the livery, Steve is livid that they intend to take it back and refuses Hostetler's offer to hire him full time. Planning to leave town anyway, he agrees to sell it to Steve, who refuses to sign the agreement first. Hearst tries to hire Al, but he refuses until he sets a proper figure and establishes Adams as his go-between.
29	5	"A Two-Headed Beast"	Dan Minahan	David Milch	July 9, 2006	N/A
Turner asks Adams to pass along a challenge to Dan. They engage in a long, brutal struggle that ends when Turner is bludgeoned to death, an experience that leaves Dan deeply disturbed. Bullock organizes a way for Steve and Hostetler to sign the agreement simultaneously in different locations, though Steve demands the confession that he was forced to write. Steve accuses Hostetler of treachery when he cannot find it, prompting him to commit suicide. Alma returns to laudanum, causing Ellsworth to move out, believing she is unhappy and he is causing it. Hearst's men kill another miner, prompting Bullock to arrest him.
30	6	"A Rich Find"	Tim Hunter	Alix Lambert	July 16, 2006	N/A
Hearst is released from prison after refusing to confess, and Al warns Bullock that they should partner to fight him. Lou's son Odell comes to town to discuss gold he found in Liberia with Hearst. Lou gives Fields money to pass along to Odell and get him to leave town, but he refuses it and goes to dinner with Hearst. Tolliver orders Leon to overdose Alma on the laudanum he sells her, but he cannot bring himself to kill her. Hearst orders Tolliver to leave her alive. Utter warns Bullock that Hearst will soon become violent, and he and Al agree to gather the local government to figure out what to do. Joanie finds Jane drunk in the street and takes her back to her room.
31	7	"Unauthorized Cinnamon"	Mark Tinker	Regina Corrado	July 23, 2006	N/A
As Hearst makes a deal with Odell to send manpower to Liberia, he confesses his hatred of Deadwood and his desire to destroy it. Joanie kisses Jane while bathing her. The governmental meeting occurs, where Bullock proposes publishing a letter of condolence in the Pioneer he wrote to a dead miner's family that implicates Hearst as immoral. The town's telegraph operator warns Al that he intercepted a coded message to Hearst confirming the imminent arrival of Pinkertons under his employ in town. Al confronts Doc, who is showing symptoms of tuberculosis, on his plans to leave town for everyone's safety and demands he stay.
32	8	"Leviathan Smiles"	Ed Bianchi	Kem Nunn	July 30, 2006	N/A
The Pioneer publishes Bullock's letter to Hearst's ire. Wyatt and Morgan Earp arrive in town claiming to have protected a stagecoach from bandits. Al suspects the story is false, but offers to hire them as henchmen anyway, while Tolliver makes the same offer. Disapproving of their descent into lawlessness, Bullock tries to get them to leave. Fields plans to leave Deadwood and Steve tries to steal his saddle to prevent this. Fields's horse kicks him in the head, leaving him paralyzed and under Fields's care. Odell leaves for New York to meet with Hearst's men. Langrishe has his ailing lead actor come to the Chez Amis so he can view their future venue as he dies. Hearst's Pinkertons arrive in town.
33	9	"Amateur Night"	Adam Davidson	Nick Towne & Zack Whedon	August 6, 2006	N/A
Morgan duels and unfairly shoots a Pinkerton after an altercation, which Bullock uses to press the Earps into leaving town. Hearst has Merrick beaten by his man Barrett. Alma clears Fields of any obligation to the livery, but he stays in town and leaves Steve in the care of the No. 10. Wu informs Al that, due to Hearst's increased hostility, he has laborers and armed men ready to defend them in Custer. Odell is found dead outside Rapid City. Jarry returns to Deadwood to inform Hearst that state soldiers are ready to come to town and rig the election in Hearst's favor. Langrishe holds an "amateur night" that allows residents to show off their talents, which leaves the town delighted. Al does not attend and instead sings "St. James Infirmary Blues" in the empty Gem.
34	10	"A Constant Throb"	Mark Tinker	W. Earl Brown	August 13, 2006	N/A
With Bullock campaigning in Sturgis, Alma is shot at while walking to the bank. Al shelters her in the Gem, believing the shots were only meant to scare her. He encourages her to go back to the bank to show defiance, and she does without issue. Hearst sends Barrett to ask Al if Alma needs guards at the bank, to which Al responds by torturing him until he admits that more Pinkertons are coming. Al kills him.
35	11	"The Catbird Seat"	Gregg Fienberg	Bernadette McNamara	August 20, 2006	N/A
Ellsworth is killed by a Pinkerton to press Alma into selling her claim to Hearst. As his body is wheeled through town, Trixie goes to the Grand Central and shoots Hearst, only wounding him in the shoulder. Sol hurries her to the Gem for protection. Preparing for the elections, Bullock encounters more of Hearst's soldiers in Sturgis. He's given a telegraph on recent events and hurries back to Deadwood. Al discusses Alma's options with Langrishe, concluding that she either needs to hire protection and leave the camp, or sell her holdings to Hearst. As Bullock comforts Alma and her daughter, Doc points out to Alma that Sofia may have not gotten to see her family's bodies, suggesting she allows her to see Ellsworth's. Al orders Wu to bring his men from Custer.
36	12	"Tell Him Something Pretty"	Mark Tinker	Ted Mann	August 27, 2006	2.03
Out of options, Alma sells her claim to Hearst. He demands Trixie's death, but Al decides to kill Jen, Johnny's favorite prostitute that looks vaguely similar to her, instead. Johnny refuses Al's order to do the killing; Al tells Dan to knock Johnny out and restrain him while he kills Jen himself. Al then passes her off as Trixie to Hearst. The election occurs, and Hearst's soldiers vote for Manning, winning him the position of sheriff. Tolliver learns that Hearst is giving him a low-ranking position in his organization and kills Leon in frustration. Satisfied with what has occurred, Hearst leaves Deadwood as Tolliver aims a gun at him from afar but does not fire. Johnny asks Al if Jen suffered, and he assures him that he did his best, grumbling about how Johnny wants to be told "something pretty" as he cleans Jen's blood.

== Deadwood: The Movie (2019) ==
Title	Directed by	Written by	Original release date	U.S. viewers (millions)
Deadwood: The Movie	Daniel Minahan	David Milch	May 31, 2019	0.931
Ten years later, Bullock is now a U.S. Marshal. Hearst, now a senator, and Alma return to town to celebrate South Dakota's statehood, while Jane returns and makes amends with Joanie, now running the Bella Union after Cy's death. Hearst recognizes Trixie as the woman who shot him when she mocks him, while Utter is found dead on his land after he refuses to sell to Hearst for construction purposes. E.B. overhears Hearst ordering the hitmen who killed Utter to kill Fields, the only witness to the murder, which he relays to Bullock at an auction where Alma outbids Hearst for Utter's land. Bullock kills one of the men to save Fields and tries to force the other to confess in front of Hearst, but his men kill him. After Trixie gives birth to Sol's son, he proposes to her and they marry in the Gem. Alma shares a dance with Bullock and accepts that they cannot be together after seeing him happy with his family. Hearst tries to have Trixie arrested for shooting him, but Bullock arrests him in turn and almost lets an angry mob kill him until he notices his family in the crowd. Manning, Bullock's deputy and an agent for Hearst, is shot by Jane after she notices him sneaking up on Bullock. As snow falls and Bullock returns to his family, Trixie visits Al, who is dying of liver failure. She holds his hand and starts to recite the Lord's Prayer, and when she says "Our Father, which art in Heaven," Al interrupts with "let Him fucking stay there."
