= List of Deadwood characters =

This article contains descriptions and biographies of fictional characters appearing in the HBO original television series Deadwood and in 2019's Deadwood: The Movie.

== Cast ==
=== Main cast ===
Actor	Character	Seasons			Film
Actor	Character	1	2	3	Film
Timothy Olyphant	Seth Bullock	Main	Main	Main	Starring
Ian McShane	Al Swearengen	Main	Main	Main	Starring
Molly Parker	Alma Garret Ellsworth	Main	Main	Main	Starring
Jim Beaver	Whitney Ellsworth	Main	Main	Main	
Brad Dourif	Doc Cochran	Main	Main	Main	Starring
John Hawkes	Sol Star	Main	Main	Main	Starring
Paula Malcomson	Trixie	Main	Main	Main	Starring
Leon Rippy	Tom Nuttall	Main	Main	Main	Starring
William Sanderson	E. B. Farnum	Main	Main	Main	Starring
Robin Weigert	Calamity Jane	Main	Main	Main	Starring
W. Earl Brown	Dan Dority	Main	Main	Main	Starring
Dayton Callie	Charlie Utter	Main	Main	Main	Starring
Keith Carradine	Wild Bill Hickok	Main			
Powers Boothe	Cy Tolliver	Main	Main	Main	
Kim Dickens	Joanie Stubbs	Recurring	Main	Main	Starring
Anna Gunn	Martha Bullock		Main	Main	Starring
Jeffrey Jones	A. W. Merrick	Recurring	Main	Main	Starring
Sean Bridgers	Johnny Burns	Recurring	Main	Main	Starring
Titus Welliver	Silas Adams	Recurring	Main	Main	
Bree Seanna Wall	Sofia Metz	Recurring	Main	Main	
Lily Keene	Sofia Metz				Starring
Josh Eriksson	William Bullock		Main		
Garret Dillahunt	Jack McCall	Recurring			
Garret Dillahunt	Francis Wolcott		Main		
Garret Dillahunt	Drunk				Cameo
Brent Sexton	Harry Manning		Recurring	Main	Starring

=== Recurring cast ===
Actor	Character	Seasons			Film
Actor	Character	1	2	3	Film
Geri Jewell	Jewel	Recurring	Recurring	Recurring	Starring
Keone Young	Mr. Wu	Recurring	Recurring	Recurring	Starring
Timothy Omundson	Brom Garret	Recurring			
Ray McKinnon	Reverend Smith	Recurring			
Ashleigh Kizer	Dolly	Recurring	Recurring	Recurring	
Ricky Jay	Eddie Sawyer	Recurring			
Larry Cedar	Leon	Recurring	Recurring	Recurring	
Peter Jason	Con Stapleton	Recurring	Recurring	Recurring	Starring
Zach Grenier	Andy Cramed	Recurring	Recurring	Guest	
Ralph Richeson	Richardson	Recurring	Recurring	Recurring	
Dan Hildebrand	Tim Driscoll	Recurring			
Dan Hildebrand	Shaughnessy			Recurring	
Franklyn Ajaye	Samuel Fields		Recurring	Recurring	Starring
Alice Krige	Maddie		Recurring		
Sarah Paulson	Miss Isringhausen		Recurring		
Meghan Glennon	Lila	Guest	Recurring	Guest	
Monty "Hawkeye" Henson	Hawkeye	Guest	Recurring	Guest	
Stephen Tobolowsky	Commissioner Jarry		Recurring	Recurring	
Richard Gant	Hostetler	Guest	Recurring	Guest	
Michael Harney	Steve		Recurring	Recurring	
Pruitt Taylor Vince	Mose Manuel		Recurring	Recurring	
Pasha D. Lychnikoff	Blazanov		Recurring	Recurring	
Gerald McRaney	George Hearst		Guest	Recurring	Starring
Allan Graf	Captain Joe Turner		Guest	Recurring	
Cleo King	"Aunt" Lou Marchbanks			Recurring	Starring
Cynthia Ettinger	Claudia			Recurring	
Brian Cox	Jack Langrishe			Recurring	
Jennifer Lutheran	Jen		Guest	Recurring	
Jade Pettyjohn	Caroline Woolgarden				Starring

== Main characters ==
=== Seth Bullock ===
Seth Bullock (Timothy Olyphant) leaves Etobicoke, Ontario, and becomes a marshal in Montana. Soon he hears stories of gold in Deadwood. Rather than searching for gold, Bullock opens a hardware store with his best friend and longtime business partner, Sol Star. At the camp, he meets Wild Bill Hickok. When Hickok is murdered, Bullock pursues the killer into the Black Hills and captures him, taking him back to South Dakota for trial. After his return, he becomes sheriff of Deadwood. Bullock, one of the few honest men in the camp, is soon enlisted to look after a gold claim for Alma Garret, an upper-class woman from the East Coast whose husband was murdered by Al Swearengen's men over the claim. Eventually, the two become sexually involved, despite the fact that Bullock is married to his brother's widow and is the stepfather of their son, his biological nephew.

He decides ultimately to end his relationship with Alma when his wife, Martha, and stepson William come to Deadwood. Later he learns Alma is pregnant with his child, but the pregnancy ends in miscarriage after she is married to Whitney Ellsworth. The relationship between Bullock and Martha continues to be rocky in the aftermath of her arrival until they are struck by tragedy, when William is killed by a wild horse. Though William's death is devastating, it brings the two closer together. Martha chooses to stay with him in Deadwood.

Bullock's honest character is instinctively repulsed by Swearengen (and vice versa), but the two form an uneasy alliance and slowly seem to develop a fondness for each other. Together they try to defend the camp against outside interests (e.g., the Hearst mining interests, the territorial government, and Alma Garret's in-laws) who have begun to appear in Deadwood when it begins to show the potential for some degree of wealth. Bullock's fiery temper, however, often clouds his judgment, distancing him from those closest to him. He makes a dangerous enemy of George Hearst because of his determination to stand against Hearst's criminal conduct. This puts him in considerable danger, as Hearst does at one point try to create circumstances in which Bullock might be lured into a lethal ambush.

In Deadwood: The Movie, Bullock has become a U.S. Marshal. Though he has had three children with Martha and seems to possess a calmer temperament, he is furious when George Hearst returns to town and orders the murder of Bullock's friend Charlie Utter. When Hearst is set upon by a mob furious about Utter's murder, Bullock's dedication to the law nearly falters as he almost allows them to kill Hearst; however, he catches sight of his family and has a change of heart, breaking up the mob and dragging Hearst into a jail cell. Afterwards, he returns home and embraces his wife.

There are several discrepancies between the historical Seth Bullock and the character in the show. In particular, the historical Bullock's wife, Martha, was not his brother's widow but his childhood sweetheart. In the pilot episode he states he came from Etobicoke, whereas the historical Bullock was born in Amherstburg.

=== Al Swearengen ===
Albert "Al" Swearengen (Ian McShane) is the proprietor of the Gem Saloon. Born in England (unlike the real Al Swearengen, who was born in Iowa Territory of Dutch descent), he lived two years in Australia before being raised in a Chicago orphanage under an abusive figure known as Mrs. Anderson, whom he mentions on occasion ran a brothel behind the girls' orphanage before running the boys' orphanage. Swearengen was among the first settlers of Deadwood, earning him several land claims and a position of considerable power and influence. The Gem Saloon offers alcohol, prostitution, and faro, and also acts as Swearengen's base of operations. He is presumably the most wealthy and influential person in the camp, relied upon to oversee many local affairs and to appoint officials, and he is greatly feared and respected.

Cunning and manipulative, Swearengen initially appears to be the most cynically amoral of all the characters, showing no hesitation in resorting to violence and murder when it serves his business interests. When former Montana marshal Seth Bullock comes to camp to sell hardware, his upright, law-abiding manner and strong sense of justice serves as an unintended yet upending threat to Swearengen. They initially butt heads until Swearengen decides to make Bullock the "face" of Deadwood and encourages him to pick up the badge again, turning Bullock's respectability to his advantage in securing the future of the camp.

Swearengen's central goal is to retain his own business interests in Deadwood and keep the camp stable and secure in order to get the territory annexed by the United States. As the camp is set upon, first by political interests and then by big capital, Swearengen comes to the realization that the preservation of his own interests depends on collaboration with others in the camp. While his alliances are often pragmatic and self-serving, Swearengen does show great loyalty to allies such as Mr. Wu. He displays an almost paternalistic (though often abusive) affection for his three main henchmen, Dan Dority, Johnny Burns, and Silas Adams. He is also affectionate toward Trixie, one of the prostitutes of the Gem, and is initially deeply offended when she begins a relationship with Sol Star.

Though he is portrayed as a cutthroat criminal, his character is shown to be more complex, motivated by a peculiar type of morality and justice as well as a need to protect the vulnerable even while seeming to disparage them. For example, though he professes to keep the crippled Jewel around in case someone with only nine cents wants a prostitute, Trixie relates that his employment of Jewel is really his "sick way" of protecting her. In the Season 1 finale, Swearengen smothers the Reverend Smith, but this was to end his suffering rather than out of ill intent. In Season 3, he murders an agent of George Hearst for shooting at Alma Garret, beating A.W. Merrick, and humiliating Wu. His opposition to both the Pinkertons and Hearst's machinations also demonstrate a character motivated by some degree of morality and the desire to protect the powerless. This is strongly contrasted with his rival Cy Tolliver, who shows little compassion or motivation beyond pure self-interest. Al is thus portrayed as a more heroic character as the series progresses, while Cy remains a villain.

In Deadwood: The Movie, Swearengen is ailing from liver failure after years of heavy drinking. He gives Trixie away at her wedding to Sol Star and announces his intention to leave Trixie the Gem upon his death. The film ends with his fate left ambiguous; when Trixie returns to the Gem to care for him, she begins to recite the Lord's Prayer — "Our Father, which art in Heaven" — to which Swearengen weakly replies, "Let Him fucking stay there."

The character is based on the real-life Al Swearengen, who owned the Gem Theater in Deadwood. Unlike the character (portrayed by British actor Ian McShane), the historical Al Swearengen was not English and was in fact born in Iowa. McShane won a Golden Globe in 2005 for his portrayal of Swearengen.

=== Alma Garret Ellsworth ===
Alma Russell Garret (Molly Parker), later Ellsworth, moved to Deadwood with her new husband Brom Garret, who left the high society of New York to experience frontier life and while in Deadwood buys a claim in the gold-rich territory. It is not long before Garret falls afoul of Al Swearengen: after Garret perceives the gold claim he purchased in a deal brokered by Swearengen to be worthless, he threatens the saloon owner with Pinkerton involvement should his money not be returned to him. Garret is promptly murdered on Swearengen's orders, only for the claim to turn out a very rich one. Now, stranded in Deadwood and dealing with attempts by Swearengen to buy the claim back, the 30-year-old widow Garret decides to try her luck on the new frontier rather than sell the claim and return East. She hires Wild Bill Hickok to investigate both the claim and Swearengen's interest. Hickok soon nominates Seth Bullock to assay her gold claim shortly before Hickok is murdered, which event renders Bullock the sole guardian of Alma's interests. Eventually, Bullock and Alma begin an affair which is cut short by the arrival of Bullock's wife and stepson, and his and Alma's mutual revulsion at the prospect of marital infidelity. Alma is, however, brokenhearted, jealous, and furious with both Bullock and his wife Martha, although she knows that feeling is irrational. Her mood is not aided by the revelation that she has become pregnant by Bullock.

In the meantime, Alma fends off not only her own father, who has heard of her newfound wealth and come seeking a share, but also a surreptitious plan by her husband's family to frame her for his murder and thereby take over the claim for themselves. The intense interest of George Hearst's mining empire in her claim also poses future problems. To ensure she is not ridiculed during her pregnancy, Trixie tells Whitney Ellsworth he should propose to Alma. After a period of hesitation, Alma accepts Ellsworth's proposal and marries him the following week in front of several Deadwood citizens and friends. In the early episodes, Alma struggles with an addiction to laudanum, an opiate used widely in the 19th century, which she overcomes with Trixie's assistance. She also takes Sofia Metz, an orphan girl whose family was murdered, under her wing as a foster daughter.

In the third season, Alma loses her baby to miscarriage and returns to her opiate addiction, this time with opium. Seeing her addiction as a sign of her unhappiness, Ellsworth decides they should separate, after which she is able to end her drug habit. She uses the wealth generated by her claim to open Deadwood's first bank but is under increasing pressure to sell the claim to Hearst. She tries to negotiate to sell him a substantial portion of the claim, but he will only accept full ownership. Hearst tries to intimidate her by having one of his men shoot at her in the street, presumably to provoke Ellsworth into being killed in a fight. Swearengen stops this from happening, but Ellsworth is later assassinated by one of Hearst's men. With no alternative other than to flee the camp, Alma reluctantly sells to Hearst.

In Deadwood: The Movie, Alma returns to Deadwood along with Sofia to oversee her banking interests in the town, having spent some years away. There remains strong romantic tension between her and Bullock, though they decline to act on their passions. Alma defies Hearst when she outbids him for the former land of Charlie Utter.

=== Whitney Ellsworth ===
Whitney Conway Ellsworth (Jim Beaver) is an experienced prospector who has sought gold all over the country, even having once worked as a miner at wage and an overseer on sites owned by the Hearst mining company. Having left his position with the company, disgusted at the nonchalant attitude toward the well-being of its miners, he is introduced in the first season as one of the many individuals who have traveled to Deadwood on the promise of wealth in the gold-rich hills, revealing himself to have a "dead-eye" for the color and having successfully managed to eke out a comfortable living in this profession.

Ellsworth is a regular of the Gem Saloon, like many of the town's prospectors, and is liked by the Gem's employees, including Trixie and Dan Dority. Early on, he witnesses Brom Garret's murder in the wilderness, but understanding the dangerous nature of their employer, he keeps this fact to himself, lest he meet a similarly unfortunate "accident". In return for his silence, Dan Dority does not make known to Swearengen Ellsworth's status as a witness.

After being hired by Seth Bullock to manage Alma's claim in order to keep her title active, Ellsworth begins growing an attachment and a strong sense of loyalty toward her and the young orphan Sofia in her care, with whom he begins to form a father-daughter bond. By the second season, Ellsworth has gone from a mere prospector to completely overseeing Alma's claim and the digging operations, as well as a trusted friend and confidant. He defends her claim by chasing off Hearst's geologist, Francis Wolcott, when he comes to spy out the territory — the two having been familiar with one another from Ellsworth's days working for the Hearst company — and advises Alma to stand her ground when rumor is spread in the camp about the future instability of gold claims once the town is annexed. He also seems to grow distanced from the Gem as well, refusing to genuflect in the presence of the likes of Dority as he once did, a sign of his moving away from his older life and his growing self-assurance and confidence. He forms friendships with Joanie Stubbs and Sol Star.

Later, Ellsworth is advised by Trixie to wed Alma, once it is clear she has become pregnant by Sheriff Bullock. Trusting it is the right thing to do and with a genuine wish to help her save face and help raise both Sofia and the future child, he proposes. She demurs at first but soon accepts his proposal and marries him the following week in front of their gathered friends and townspeople.

When George Hearst attempts to force Alma to sell him her gold claim, Ellsworth is one of the few in town who stands up to him. But his relationship with Alma falls apart when she miscarries and begins using opiates again, now opium. The final straw comes when she gets high and attempts to consummate their relationship out of obligation. Despite this, they remain friends. Near the end of Season 3, Ellsworth is shot to death by one of Hearst's agents while supervising Alma's claim. His body is brought to camp in the back of a wagon, and many people, especially Alma and Trixie, are shocked and upset by his death.

As originally written, the character was simply named "Ellsworth". When the wedding episode required Ellsworth's full name to be revealed, Jim Beaver, a film historian engaged in writing a biography of TV Superman George Reeves, suggested his character be named after the first producer of Adventures of Superman, Whitney Ellsworth.

=== Doc Cochran ===
Dr. Amos "Doc" Cochran (Brad Dourif) is the only doctor in the camp of Deadwood. A veteran of the Civil War, he is an honest and moral professional who shows extreme dedication to and compassion for the sick and injured, without bias for their attitudes, loyalties, creed or colour. Doc Cochran is relatively invulnerable to the risk of violence in Deadwood, as he is valuable to Swearengen and Tolliver for his medical maintenance of the prostitutes, and as a result is unafraid to speak his mind to both of them, as well as many others, whenever their behavior is cold and cruel. He has been charged with grave robbery seven times; at this time, body snatching is virtually the only method of procuring bodies for dissection, to advance medical knowledge. When the Reverend Smith is at his last extremity, dying of a brain tumor, Cochran prays for the reverend to be released from suffering, and weeps as he recalls the cries of agony he heard on the battlefield during the Civil War.

When Swearengen falls ill in Season 2, Cochran refuses to lose another patient, despite being under so much stress he cannot stop his hands from shaking. In the end, he succeeds in treating Al and his confidence seems to improve again. He constantly displays a moral compass similar to humanist philosophy. When Chinese prostitutes appear in town, Cochran is shocked by the inhumane conditions in which they are kept. Much to his distress, he is barred from treating them and forced to simply stand by and watch them die. In Season 3, he becomes ill and shows symptoms of tuberculosis. Al, however, spurs him on not to just lie down and die, remarking "I ain't learning a new Doc's 'quirks'." As of Deadwood: The Movie, Cochran has survived and continues to treat Al, who is suffering from liver failure. Due to Al's ill health, Al bequeaths one-third of his finances to Doc in the event of his death.

=== Sol Star ===
Solomon "Sol" Star (John Hawkes) is Seth Bullock's best friend and partner in the hardware business and the only Jewish resident of the camp. He is originally from Vienna, Austria. Imperturbable, reliable, and sensible, Sol becomes a rising force in the camp; originally seeing the potential wealth in providing tools to the prospectors in Deadwood, the second season sees Sol set his sights on forming the first bank in Deadwood in partnership with Alma Garret. Though mocked by Swearengen at every turn for his being Jewish, particularly during the initial phase of buying the future site of the Bullock and Star hardware store from the saloon owner, Sol never rises to the bait, showing not only his business acumen but his levelheadedness as opposed to his friend's occasionally rash nature. Though he seems meek in nature, he proves to be capable of standing up for himself when provoked.

Sol also forms a relationship with Trixie, Swearengen's favored girl at The Gem. She helps nurse him back to health from a bullet wound sustained as a bystander to the fight between Swearengen and Bullock in Season 2, but Sol becomes frustrated at the fondness and loyalty she still retains for Swearengen. By the third season, Star has become such a respectable figure of the camp that he runs for mayor against E. B. Farnum. Knowing he will win, Swearengen connives to sell Star a house and has Trixie housed in the hotel next door where she can enter his room through a secret passage in the wall, to make their relationship less of an open secret and make Star appear a more respectable candidate. George Hearst ultimately costs Star the election by bribing soldiers to vote for Farnum. In Deadwood: The Movie, Sol and Seth have entered into the hotel business, while he and Trixie are expecting their first child. After their son is born, the two are married in a joyful ceremony.

=== Trixie ===
Trixie (Paula Malcomson) is Al Swearengen's favorite girl at the Gem. Swearengen is often abusive toward her, but she always returns to him and he in turn often shows great affection for her, though not openly.

Despite her rather frank and foul-mouthed nature, she is one of the more compassionate members of the camp. When she is nursing Alma and Sofia, she helps Alma kick her dope habit against the wishes of Swearengen. She attempts suicide afterward believing Al will kill her for going against his wishes. Despite her insubordination, Swearengen is most angry because of this attempt to kill herself. She seems not to know her last name, as she asks a receipt to be made to "Trixie the whore" when she makes a deposit at the Deadwood bank.

In an effort to get out from under Al, Trixie acknowledges Sol Star's affection toward her. At first she is reluctant to foster a romantic relationship on account of being a prostitute, but as she spends more time away from the Gem, she grows closer to Star, who teaches her accounting. While initially Swearengen comes between Star and Trixie, he later releases Trixie back to a sort of apprenticeship at the hardware store.

The relationship between Trixie and Star is rekindled when she nurses him back to health after he is shot and with whom she eventually finds employment and romance, but she remains devoted to Swearengen and reports back to him on Star's and Bullock's activities and disguising her true feelings for Star. She also uses her accounting skills for a short time working as a clerk at the bank. It is implied Al is in love with her and spurs her later on to have a better quality of life than he could provide for her. He verbally attacks Trixie when she casually mentions she would "like to turn a fuckin' trick" long after she has stopped working as a prostitute, chastising her for not realizing "when her lot's improved."

Trixie is friends with Ellsworth, who shows her kindness. Devastated on learning he has been killed, she marches to the Grand Hotel to kill Hearst, with her top undone and skirt lifted to take attention away from her face. She shoots him in the shoulder but does not kill him, and Hearst wants her killed in retaliation. Al will not allow it and instead kills another prostitute, Jen, who resembles her, to placate Hearst.

A decade later, in Deadwood: The Movie, Trixie is pregnant with Sol Star's son and continues to harbor guilt over Jen's death. Upon Hearst's return to town, she furiously insults him from her balcony, causing him to realize he had been deceived by Al years earlier. She gives birth shortly afterward, and subsequently agrees to marry Sol. When Hearst attempts to have Trixie arrested during the wedding celebrations, Bullock and the town marshal their resources to protect her. The film ends with Trixie at the Gem Saloon, which an ailing Swearengen has chosen to leave her upon his death.

The character is not based on a single real-life person. The scene of her putting a bullet through the skull of a violent client who astounds all by clinging to life for another half hour is based on an actual report by John S. McClintock of such an occurrence involving a prostitute at the Gem Theater named "Tricksie." This includes the detail of the doctor inserting a probe through the hole in the man's skull.

=== Tom Nuttall ===
Thomas "Tom" Nuttall (Leon Rippy) is proprietor of the No. 10 Saloon, which is the site of Wild Bill Hickok's murder. (The saloon is named for its address on the camp's main thoroughfare.) One of the first settlers to arrive in Deadwood, arriving before even Swearengen, he has grown increasingly disillusioned with the camp and its future and has gone as far as to consider selling his saloon and leaving the camp.

Towards the end of Season 1, he convinces Swearengen to set up his saloon's card dealer, Con Stapleton, as the camp's first sheriff, but renounces him when Stapleton falls under Cy Tolliver's corrupting influence and is physically stripped of his badge by Bullock. In Season 2 he receives the first bicycle in camp, which he defends against ridicule by accepting a challenge to ride through the town over difficult terrain. He forms a brief friendship with William Bullock. After a spooked horse tramples William, Tom feels a great deal of remorse due to William having been placed by his mother into Tom's care in order for William to watch the bicycle ride.

Swearengen, having acquired a dead Native American chief's head, muses to it about Tom's violent past, saying he'd "sent many of your friends to the happy hunting ground. Formidable, Tom was. And no more fool now than time shows us all." In Season 3 he expresses interest in co-founding a Deadwood fire brigade with his barman, Harry Manning, who is standing for Sheriff. Nuttall even goes so far as ordering fireman supplies ahead of their official approval by the town council. His saloon's business has slowed down, now only servicing a handful of customers. Nuttall plays the spoons at the Amateur Night of John Langrishe's theatre.

A decade later, in Deadwood: The Movie, he is still running the #10 Saloon. His business is thriving due to the increased population of Deadwood.

The Nuttall character is based on a real-life person named William "Billy" Nuttall, co-owner of the real-life #10 Saloon in the Deadwood camp.

=== E. B. Farnum ===
Eustace Bailey "E. B." Farnum (William Sanderson) is the proprietor of the Grand Central Hotel and self-appointed mayor of the town, a role he inhabits with comic opera buffoonish seriousness. He is totally controlled by Swearengen, although he harbors delusions of potential grandeur for himself. He is incredibly greedy — costing Al the chance to buy Alma Garret's claim due to his low offers — and continually asks prying questions to people around town, leading to numerous abuses and threats directed towards him. He was the agent in helping establish the Bella Union in town, although Al chooses to let him live as an informant.

He is disliked and insulted by most members of the camp and is beaten by Sheriff Bullock at one point when he believes that Farnum has betrayed information of his relationship with Alma to George Hearst. Hearst soon buys the Grand Central from Farnum, offering him $100,000 and position as manager. This distances him from Swearengen's operations and makes him an isolated figure.

His one and only confidant is his servant, Richardson, whom he scolds and insults on many occasions, but as Season 3 progresses even he is distanced from him as Richardson becomes friends with Hearst's cook, Aunt Lou. Hearst's attitude towards him drives him to the brink and Farnum finally tries to stand up to him and return to Al's good graces. In the Deadwood film, Farnum remains mayor and hotelier, using his tendency to pry and eavesdrop for good on one occasion, when he warns Seth Bullock that Samuel Fields' life is in danger.

=== Calamity Jane ===
Calamity Jane (Robin Weigert), a frontierswoman and former scout for General George Armstrong Custer, first arrived in Deadwood with Wild Bill Hickok and Charlie Utter. She idolizes Hickok, is friends with Utter (albeit grudgingly), and forges a friendship with Doc Cochran, after their joint efforts in protecting Sofia Metz and the doctor's enlistment of her aid in fighting a smallpox epidemic.

Known for her hard drinking and swearing, Jane is truculent and abrasive upon first impression, but her character has a loopy humor and an upright moral center that grows on people in the camp, and she is deeply compassionate to the ill and helpless. After Hickok's murder, she sinks into severe depression and alcoholism. At the end of Season 1, she leaves camp, telling Utter that she cannot bear to be a drunk in the place where Hickok is buried. Utter is seen voicing "grave doubts" about Jane's future to Hickok's grave.

Despite a constant tough front, she is often overcome with fear when confronted with violence (such as with Tolliver and Swearengen). Her first disclosure of personal history seemingly comes as an outburst of trauma after she fails to keep Al away from the child she has sworn to protect. When the doc tells her that she isn't the first to have been frightened into inaction by Al, she rounds on doc, shouting (seemingly more in response to her own thoughts than to what he said), that she knows she's not the first, and that bigger, badder men than him have hurt her since she was smaller than the girl they care for. She finds happiness in her relationship with Joanie Stubbs, who invites Jane to live with her and helps her through her depression; the two eventually begin a romantic liaison. In Deadwood: The Movie, Jane returns to town after years away. After initial friction between her and Joanie, they begin to rekindle their relationship, and both are deeply affected by Charlie Utter's murder. At the end of the film, Jane overcomes her fears and kills the treacherous Harry Manning in order to save Seth Bullock from a gunshot to the back. Though she insists that Wild Bill Hickok's spirit came into her at that moment, Joanie assures her that she alone was responsible for that moment of heroism. Afterwards, Joanie and Jane contemplate traveling the world, starting with France.

Though never referred to as "Calamity Jane" in the original series, the origin of her nickname is implied by Andy Cramed, a smallpox victim left to die in the woods by Cy Tolliver, whom she helped nurse back to health. Upon his recovery, he tells her "Hereafter in calamity, I'll be sure to call for Jane."

=== Dan Dority ===
Dan Dority (W. Earl Brown) is Al Swearengen's right-hand man. A former bushwhacker, he has been with Al for years and serves him as a bodyguard, enforcer, and killer. While violent and short-tempered, Dority is not a heartless killer. In the first season he defies Al with the help of Doc Cochran by helping spirit Sofia Metz out of town instead of killing her, and chooses not to harm Ellsworth even though he knows Ellsworth witnessed his murder of Brom Garret. Many others fall victim to Dan's short temper, though. He is very loyal to Al; when Al is deathly ill at the start of Season 2, Dan tells Trixie that he would have been a good-for-nothing scumbag if he had never met Al.

Dan is sometimes jealous of fellow henchman Silas Adams' favor with Al, leading Adams to comment to him, "Any chance you and me don't end in blood?" The two have an uneasy alliance, however, and Adams saves Dan from a throat-cutting in the Season 2 finale. Al's choice to use Adams in his negotiations with George Hearst also draws resentment, despite Dan's clear unsuitability for the task. In Season 3, Dority is challenged to a fight by Hearst's bodyguard, Captain Turner. He wins, brutally killing Turner in the streets of Deadwood, but is nearly killed himself. The incident leaves him slightly traumatized, now fully realizing his own mortality.

A decade later, in Deadwood: The Movie, Dority is still the loyal henchman to Al. He becomes concerned with Al's ill health and persuades Doc to care for him. Dan is tasked with making Al abstain from alcohol (to no avail). With Al sensing his own mortality, he bequeaths one-third of his finances to Dan.

=== Charlie Utter ===
Charles "Charlie" Utter (Dayton Callie) is the good friend of Hickok and Jane, and Hickok's sometime business partner. He runs a mail and freight business in the camp and is also one of Bullock's deputies. He is an honest and uncomfortable person with a kind and generous nature. Incredibly noble, he is also tough and fearless in the face of adversity and not afraid to speak his mind clearly.

He is friends with Joanie Stubbs and is approached by her in desperation upon the murders of three of her prostitutes by Wolcott, smuggling the rest out of town to safety. Sworn to secrecy about the matter, Utter nevertheless takes the opportunity to administer a terrible beating to Wolcott on the pretext of Wolcott's having stepped on Utter's toe. Later, though, Charlie displays some pity for the man.

He continues to have an up and down relationship with Jane as she continues to decline into alcoholism, despite the abuse she gives him; he constantly looks out for her, spurring her on to take a job at his freight business and to start a friendship with Joanie Stubbs. He displays his fearlessness again in Season 3 when he harasses Hearst in his cell after he is arrested by Bullock, trivializing the man's authority in the camp. He later threatens his life at the door of his hotel room.

In Deadwood: The Movie, Utter considers selling a plot of land he has developed over many years to George Hearst. When he ultimately declines to sell, Hearst has him murdered, causing no end of anger and grief from his friends and fellow townspeople. Samuel Fields, the only witness to Utter's death, later tells Bullock that Utter was singing and at peace at the moment of his death.

The character is based on the real-life person "Colorado" Charlie Utter, a member of Wild Bill Hickok's entourage. However, the nickname "Colorado Charlie" is never used for the character on the show.

=== Wild Bill Hickok ===
James Butler "Wild Bill" Hickok (Keith Carradine) has a reputation as one of the fastest gunslingers around. He arrives in Deadwood as a weary man who seems determined to let his compulsive drinking and gambling take over. With him are his friend, Charlie Utter, and devotee, Calamity Jane. He has apparently come to prospect but despite Charlie Utter's attempts to persuade him to do so, he shows no interest and scolds Charlie for not leaving him be. He becomes friends with Bullock after they save Sofia and shoot down one of her attackers.

Charlie thinks Bullock will have a positive effect on Bill, and works to bring the two together before Bill's death.

He becomes involved with Alma's affair, first by turning down her husband's request to help him get money back from Al Swearengen after he has been tricked into buying a dry claim. He represents Alma when Brom is killed and enlists Bullock to help him find a prospector to look at the claim.

Wild Bill frequents Tom Nuttall's No. 10 Saloon, as opposed to the Gem or the Bella Union, at one point explaining to Al Swearengen "you don't have poker" when asked why he doesn't visit the Gem more often. Eventually, Nuttall begins fronting cash to Bill in order to keep the legendary lawman as a regular of his establishment, which Nuttal believes is good for business. When Bill's fortunes at the card table take a turn for the better, he runs afoul of Jack McCall after winning all of his money. McCall angrily insults Wild Bill, and in response, Bill slides him a one-dollar chip telling him to go buy some breakfast. Seething over the perceived insult, McCall later returns to the No. 10 where Bill is uncharacteristically sitting with his back to the door (instead of to the wall, as is his wont). McCall approaches Hickok from behind and shoots him in the head at point-blank range, killing him instantly.

=== Cy Tolliver ===
Cyrus "Cy" Tolliver (Powers Boothe) is the owner of the upscale Bella Union saloon and Al Swearengen's main rival. Cy has an 18-year relationship with former prostitute and madam Joanie Stubbs, who later leaves the Bella Union to form her own brothel, leaving a mix of friendship and anger between them. Cy is clearly in love with Joanie and is bitter not to have his feelings reciprocated. Ruthless and with a veneer of class and polish, Cy soon proves that while he may lack his rival's skill in cunning duplicity he makes it up in ambition, becoming temporarily allied with the Hearst combine in Season 2. He also becomes partners with Mr. Lee, the newly arrived Tong leader from San Francisco, in "Celestial’s Alley", an area of low-priced gambling and Chinese prostitution that sees women placed in unspeakably horrid conditions, a fact Cy dismisses as a mere "cultural difference." However, he does accept Doc Cochran's offer to treat them for free, as a condition of Cochran's continuing to treat Tolliver's white prostitutes. As Season 2 climaxes, Swearengen ends up on top, leaving Cy Tolliver in a weakened position with both Francis Wolcott and Mr. Lee dead and Cy receiving a knife to the stomach courtesy of Andy Cramed, after attempting to coerce him into ending his ministerial activities.

Tolliver survives but becomes increasingly desperate and unstable. Though he clearly despises Tolliver, Hearst employs him to act as his agent, but Tolliver finds Hearst difficult to work with. When he hands Hearst an advantage, having discovered that Leon is dealing dope to Alma, Hearst rants angrily that he should have told him sooner. When Hearst leaves camp, he puts Tolliver in charge of his "other-than-mining interests," as Cy snidely puts it, making him angry at Hearst for all but eliminating their business together. Soon afterwards, Tolliver exits to the Bella Union balcony accompanied by Leon and a prostitute. He stabs Leon and tells him he's stupid for congratulating him on his remaining business with Hearst. In his anger he points a gun at Hearst's coach as it readies to leave the camp, but does not shoot him. Instead he presses the gun to the prostitute's forehead, before regaining his calm and returning inside. Tolliver is said to have died sometime before Deadwood: The Movie (reflecting the death of Powers Boothe in 2017), and has left the Bella Union to Joanie Stubbs.

=== Joanie Stubbs ===
Joanie Stubbs (Kim Dickens) is Cy Tolliver's former madam at the Bella Union. Joanie, unlike Trixie, acts only as the hostess, and not as a prostitute herself. Although she is a lesbian, Stubbs has a long relationship with Cy and is one of the few people Cy genuinely cares for, though his increasingly unpredictable and violent behavior sours their friendship. Often depressed and self-loathing, Joanie was apparently bought by Cy from her own father for $6.50, who had abused and pimped her and her younger sisters as prostitutes. Joanie also reveals that her father used her to coerce her sisters to sleep with him—to "see to his needs since mama was gone." As a result, the emotionally scarred Joanie is weighed down by guilt.

Cy encourages Joanie to spread her wings and form her own brothel, though he often seems reluctant to let her go. With money from Eddie Sawyer who used his sleight of hand skills to steal from Cy, she leaves the Bella Union to open the Chez Amis, importing high-class and experienced prostitutes from the East with her friend Maddie. Unfortunately, Maddie has funded the operation with funds from Francis Wolcott, who is violent toward women and has a history of killing prostitutes. When Tolliver discovers this and tries to blackmail Wolcott, Wolcott kills Doris, Carrie and Maddie. Having borrowed $1400 from Jack, Joanie arranges for the surviving prostitutes to be spirited to safety by her loyal friend Charlie Utter, but remains sitting alone in her shuttered place of business with her dreams of independence destroyed. Her spirits are restored by smashing a bourbon bottle on Wolcott's head when he returns to the scene. She also finds comfort in her burgeoning friendship and later romantic attachment to Calamity Jane. Joanie attempts to rebuild her life by making Le Chez Amis into a schoolhouse, which also becomes the refuge of Mose Manuel, who recovers there after being shot in the Bella Union. She later sells Le Chez Amis to Jack Langrishe who converted it into a theater in exchange for building a new schoolhouse.

In Deadwood: The Movie, Joanie has become the owner of the Bella Union after the implied death of Tolliver. Though Calamity Jane, upon returning to town, finds Joanie in a state of depression, the two gradually rekindle their relationship and find happiness together.

=== Martha Bullock ===
Martha Eccles Bullock (Anna Gunn) is Seth Bullock's wife and former sister-in-law. Seth's brother Robert had been a cavalryman and died while fighting Comancheros in Texas. Bullock felt obliged to marry and take care of the widow and her son (Seth's nephew), although he is not actually romantically involved with her. Such marriages were a common custom of the time to prevent children from growing up fatherless after the Civil War and Indian Wars. Martha arrives in Deadwood at the beginning of Season 2. She feels a confusing mix of gratitude and duty towards Bullock, perhaps even romantic love for him, but wishes he not sacrifice his own happiness any more than necessary to provide for her and her son. Even so, she still harbors a great deal of jealousy towards her husband's former relationship with and persistent feelings for Alma Garret, though she is perplexed by his reluctance to act on them. Martha is devastated by the death of her son William. The grief, however, brings her and Seth closer together and they continue to live together in Deadwood. She later becomes the teacher of the camp's children. As of Deadwood: The Movie, she and Seth remain happily married and have three children.

The real-life Marguerite "Martha" Bullock was not the widow of Seth Bullock's brother, but had married Bullock prior to coming to Deadwood.

=== A. W. Merrick ===
A. Walter "A. W." Merrick (Jeffrey Jones) is the proprietor of the local newspaper, the Black Hills Pioneer. Somewhat pretentious in his bearing, he prides himself as a newspaperman with a duty to print the truth, but must navigate a twisty path of remaining friends with all the major players in town and being privy to their plans and confidences. He gains the friendship of Seth Bullock, Sol Star, and Charlie Utter, and even suggests that since he enjoys walking and socializing with them about the local goings on that they should form a club for doing just that.

Though not a man of great courage, Merrick is a man of principle. He refuses to print Commissioner Jarry's notice which puts claims in the camp under doubt, and as a result comes under attack from Tolliver, who sends Leon and Stapleton to trash his press. After this, Swearengen makes Merrick his ally and conspires with him to print articles in the paper to draw back his control and bring elections to the camp. Merrick comes under attack again in Season 3 when he publishes a letter designed to embarrass Hearst. Hearst has him beaten up as a result, and Merrick is injured to the point where he cannot put on his clothes by himself. He is also one of the few people Al really seems to like, as he even kills the one responsible for Merrick's beating. A decade later, in Deadwood: The Movie, Merrick continues to operate the Pioneer. With the return of George Hearst, he joins the townsfolk in harassing him due to his prior and present actions. He photographs Hearst when he is arrested for Charlie Utter's murder.

=== Johnny Burns ===
John "Johnny" Burns (Sean Bridgers) is an employee of the Gem Saloon and one of Al's lackeys. His main jobs are tending bar, cleaning, and hauling corpses to Wu's pigsty. Although young and ambitious, Johnny is not too bright, leading Al to continually abuse him verbally and physically. He shoots Charlie Utter and Sol Star in season 2 but does not kill them, and expresses severe remorse, unlike Adams and Dority. Though Johnny is very loyal to Al, he refuses to kill the prostitute Jen whom Al is trying to trick Hearst into thinking is Trixie. Johnny tries but can't put himself up to the deed, and tells Al he won't do it. Therefore, Dan knocks him out and ties him up while Al carries out his plan. Later Dan frees him, and Johnny asks Al if Jen suffered. Al says he tried to do it as painlessly as possible. When Johnny leaves the room, Al adds the comment, "Wants me to tell him something pretty." In Deadwood: The Movie, Burns remains affected by Jen's death, but forms a new relationship with a recent arrival to the Gem Saloon, Caroline Woolgarden.

Although Johnny is portrayed as very dumb, he does show some forms of intelligence. For example, he can read and teach it to others, and later in the series, he shows understanding of Wu's drawings and pidgin English when even Al cannot make out the meaning, leading to a punch in the face by an embarrassed Al.

=== Silas Adams ===
Silas Adams (Titus Welliver), also known as "the bagman from Yankton", comes to camp to collect bribe money for Magistrate Clagget. Swearengen hires Adams to join his operation, as he is smarter than Al's other lackeys, paying him to slice Clagget's throat for extorting money from Swearengen. Adams serves Swearengen as his contact in Yankton to bring him news of the territorial changes. Al also relies on Adams' legal counsel when dealing with Commissioner Jarry and his election proposals. Adams also serves as middleman between Swearengen and George Hearst.

Adams has a brief, ill-fated romance with Miss Isringhausen, who turns out to be a Pinkerton agent. He is a rival of Dan Dority's for Swearengen's favor, although Adams saves Dan's life from a Chinese knife-wielder in the season 2 finale, and the two form a tenuous alliance.

=== Sofia Metz ===
Sofia Metz (Bree Seanna Wall; Lily Keene in the film) is the sole survivor of an attack on her family on the way home to her native Minnesota. She and her family are members of the Norwegian community in Minnesota, and are referred to as "squareheads" by Swearengen, a slur against Scandinavians. Unknown to Swearengen, a robbery by men who often work for him is disguised as an attack by hostile Indians, and leaves Sofia traumatized and unresponsive. With her parents and two sisters (Marta and Ingrid) murdered, yet possibly unable to speak English, she is nevertheless targeted for murder by Swearengen to eliminate the possibility of her identifying her family's killers; however, with the help and protection of Jane Cannary and Doc Cochran, she regains her health and becomes the ward of Alma Garret. She grows especially close to Whitney Ellsworth after his business dealings with and later marriage to Garret, and is instrumental in convincing Garret that they should stay in Deadwood so that they can continue to visit his final resting place. In Deadwood: The Movie, Sofia and Alma return to Deadwood after many years away to attend the statehood celebrations, during which she meets and befriends fellow passenger Caroline Woolgarden, who later finds work at the Gem Saloon.

=== William Bullock ===
William Bullock (Josh Eriksson) is Seth Bullock's nephew turned stepson. He is very polite and is respectful towards those with authority. William shows much respect towards his stepfather and admires his accomplishments. His first sight of Deadwood is when his stagecoach rolls to a stop next to the sight of his stepfather and Swearengen in a deadly serious brawl, which had just propelled them off the second floor balcony onto the street, punctuated by partisan onlookers taking shots at each other. Swearengen is about to stab Seth Bullock with a knife, which he had produced from hiding, but when he sees the boy, he pauses and raises his bloody head to grin demonically at the passengers and bellow "Welcome to fucking Deadwood! Can be combative!" One day while playing with Tom Nuttall on Tom's new bicycle, shortly after dismounting from the bike, young William is trampled and killed by Samuel Fields' horse after it escapes an attempted gelding.

=== Francis Wolcott ===
Francis Wolcott (Garret Dillahunt), the chief geologist for wealthy San Francisco mining magnate George Hearst, has arrived in camp in order to ascertain whether any of the claims might be of value to the Hearst empire, and if so, to set about acquiring them by any means necessary. He enlists Cy Tolliver to operate as the front for his operation.

He has a sexually violent attitude towards women and has murdered prostitutes. He seems unable to control these impulses and struggles to explain them. Wolcott's violent appetite emerges in camp when he kills three prostitutes, including Joanie's friend Maddie, at the Chez Amis. Tolliver disposes of the bodies and covers for Wolcott. When Tolliver sees his operations with Wolcott have failed to bring him standing with Hearst, he tells Hearst about Wolcott's activities. Hearst dismisses Wolcott from his organization. Wolcott hangs himself from the balcony of the Grand Hotel shortly thereafter.

In the commentary for "New Money", David Milch revealed Wolcott was likely sexually abused as a youth, most likely by his mother, which Joanie immediately picks up on, as does he of her own incestuous relationships.

=== Harry Manning ===
Harry Manning (Brent Sexton) is the bartender at Tom Nuttall's No. 10 Saloon. Manning runs for sheriff despite his desire to become chief of the volunteer fire department. George Hearst arranges for Manning's election win via bribery. (Manning's "win" is not confirmed onscreen but is implied by the disparity between vote totals at the end of the season three finale).

A decade later, in Deadwood: The Movie, Bullock is U.S. Marshal and Manning is a deputy. Manning claims gout prevents him from actively performing his duties, while Bullock blames Manning's poor work ethic. Manning accepts bribes from Senator George Hearst to help him gain control of Charlie Utter's land. As part of Hearst's plan, Manning assists Hearst's assassins to kidnap Samuel Fields, then fakes being attacked. When Hearst is arrested for suspicion of Utter's murder, Manning tries to shoot Bullock in the back, but Jane kills Harry before he can fire his gun.

== Supporting characters ==
=== Jewel ===
Jewel (Geri Jewell) is the disabled cleaning woman at the Gem Saloon. Jewel often uses her job in the Gem to "overhear" what is really going on. Coffee and most of the meals from the Gem kitchen are prepared by her. Al makes a public show of barely tolerating her, often publicly referring to her as "the gimp" or complaining about her noisily dragging her stiff leg. Jewel responds with a cheerful, mocking disrespect Al would tolerate from no one else. When Al is briefly disabled after a minor stroke, Jewel comments, "He's always dragging that fucking leg!" Despite Jewel's apparent dismissal of Al's comments, she takes it upon herself to enlist the town doctor to make her a leg brace to ease her own movement, as well as Al's loud constant complaining.

Trixie, defending Swearengen to Calamity Jane, cites Jewel as an example of Al's kindness, which he publicly downplays. Al maintains that he only keeps Jewel around in case a customer "only has nine cents" (i.e., can't afford the usual price of a Gem prostitute), but Trixie calls this "his sick ... way of protecting her" implying he may simply be fond of her, as she is seen exclusively cooking and cleaning. It is also hinted Al pays her to do this. At one point Al remarks that he first met Jewel in a Chicago orphanage, suggesting that their relationship is akin to that of brother and sister. Jewel is also shown to be quite strong and dependable, taking charge when Al is ill and locked in his office and ordering Dan to break the door down when the others are afraid to approach.

She is played by Geri Jewell, who is affected by cerebral palsy.

=== Samuel Fields ===
The "Nigger General" Samuel Fields (Franklyn Ajaye), loosely based on the historical Samuel Fields, is first befriended by Calamity Jane. He is nearly lynched during mob violence led by the drunk Steve Fields. Later, Steve is caught by Hostetler during a sexual act on the sheriff's horse's leg. Samuel walks in on Hostetler planning to kill Steve, but persuades him to blackmail Steve by signing a confession on a blackboard.

Near the end of Season 2, a wild horse, which Samuel and Hostetler are attempting to geld, escapes from their care and tramples William Bullock, the son of Martha Bullock. Samuel stops Hostetler from committing suicide over the incident, and instead they ride out of town to capture the escaped horse. When they return, Samuel and Hostetler plan to start a livery in Oregon, but Steve drives Hostetler to suicide with his racial taunts and epithets. Fields plans to leave town, but he is held up by his promise to help Aunt Lou persuade her son to leave. Later, Steve offers him a job at the livery, all the while verbally abusing him. Samuel refuses, and when he returns to the livery to depart with his horse, he discovers that Steve has been paralyzed by a blow to the head. Samuel takes up Steve's care, at first delighted for being able to mock him back, but soon he changes his conduct and takes good care of him. He lingers in camp looking after the horses and Steve, pushing him around in a wheelbarrow, paying for his care, and addressing him in a friendly manner. He attempts to leave the camp many times, but finds fate intervening whenever he is about to leave.

In Deadwood: The Movie, Samuel's tendency to fish on Charlie Utter's land leads him to witness Utter's murder, and he is nearly lynched by Utter's killers before being saved by Bullock. As he recuperates, he assures Bullock that Utter was at peace when he died, and the two hold hands.

=== Mr. Wu ===
Mr. Wu (Keone Young) is the official or unofficial leader of Deadwood's substantial but mostly unseen Chinese ("Celestials") population, the Asian counterpart to Swearengen. He routinely interacts with Swearengen and other Caucasians over a few matters of business, such as the opium trade, and the seemingly daily efficient disposal of numerous human remains, through the route of his pigs. He knows almost no English beyond the words "San Francisco," "cocksucker," and "Hearst." He however communicates effectively with Swearengen (whom he refers to as "Swedgin!") with the aid of charcoal drawings and hand signals. Nonetheless, Swearengen considers his shaking hand signals and lack of eye contact to be disturbing.

In Season 2, he becomes highly anxious over the arrival in town of the much more polished Mr. Lee from San Francisco, who appears to be the local representative of a large and shadowy tong organization allied with George Hearst, which henceforward supplies Deadwood with opium and low-priced Chinese prostitutes, from a new establishment to be called "Celestials' Alley", in partnership with Tolliver.

In the second season's final episode, Wu strikes back with the blessing of Hearst and Swearengen, slitting Lee's throat and leading Swearengen's crew to kill Lee's men. Swearengen strikes a deal for Wu to take over Lee's position of finding laborers for Hearst's mining operation, easily supplanting Tolliver in running Chinese affairs. In a symbol of loyalty to Swearengen, Wu slices off his braid (an action punishable by death in China at the time) and declares he will remain in America forever.

In Season 3, he returns from business in San Francisco wearing Western dress (which, as multiple characters remark, he looks terrible in). Wu had been tasked by Al with recruiting Chinese laborers in San Francisco to work in Hearst's mines. Sensing that Swearengen and Hearst have become bitter rivals, he holds the workers in another town rather than bring them to Deadwood. In the series finale he brings his men into town in case the dealings with George Hearst take a turn for the worse. In Deadwood: The Movie, Wu vigilantly monitors Al's declining health with the help of his grandson Mengyao.

The character can be loosely based on Wong Fee Lee, the owner of several Chinatown businesses and properties including the Wing Tsue bazaar.

=== Con Stapleton ===
Con Stapleton (Peter Jason) starts out as the dim-witted card dealer at the No. 10 saloon. He can be easily distinguished by his large, bright-colored and ill-fitting hat, which he is never seen without. Stapleton is briefly installed as sheriff when the No. 10's owner, Tom Nuttall, begins to fear that the camp is "leaving him behind" and asks Al Swearengen to set up his employee in a position of power.

However, Stapleton quickly lets himself be bribed by Tolliver to stir up anti-Chinese sentiment. After murdering a Chinese resident of the camp without justification, he is stripped of his badge by an enraged Bullock. While Nuttall renounces him following the incident, Stapleton has remained in Tolliver's employ, often working with Leon, doing odd jobs such as security at the Bella Union and trashing Merrick's printing press. He is later seduced by one of Jack Langrishe's theatre troupe. As of Deadwood: The Movie, he has become a reverend. Stapleton presides over the wedding of Sol Star and Trixie in a joint Jewish-Christian ceremony.

=== Aunt Lou Marchbanks ===
"Aunt" Lou Marchbanks (Cleo King) is George Hearst's personal cook. As Hearst has recently bought the Grand Central Hotel, she becomes the cook there, forming a friendship with the hotel's former cook Richardson, who becomes her assistant. When her son Odell arrives in Deadwood intent on making a business proposition to Hearst, she unsuccessfully attempts to convince her son to leave town and return to Liberia, recognizing Hearst's dangerous nature. Her fears are seemingly confirmed when Odell is found dead under suspicious circumstances. She enjoys playing mahjong and seems to have at least some basic understanding of the Chinese language. In Deadwood: The Movie, Lou has left Hearst's employ and now is the only cook at the Grand Central Hotel. She also helps Trixie deliver her firstborn son.

The character is loosely based on former slave Lucretia "Aunt Lou" Marchbanks, a celebrated cook who worked for several mining superintendents in the Black Hills (though was never employed by Hearst).

=== Caroline Woolgarden ===
Caroline Woolgarden (Jade Pettyjohn)

=== George Hearst ===
George Hearst (Gerald McRaney) is a wealthy mining magnate and later U.S. Senator who first made his fortune on the Comstock, Utah Territory. His employee Francis Wolcott acts on his behalf in attempts to acquire gold claims for him in Deadwood throughout season 2, in less than honest ways.

In the season 2 finale, Hearst makes several arrangements with figures in the camp, such as purchasing the Grand Central from Farnum, although Hearst gives no indication of the psychopathic behavior he would exhibit in season 3. Although an avowed misanthrope (as revealed in season 3), he acknowledges the necessities of social propriety by firing Wolcott for cutting the throats of three prostitutes. Tolliver attempts to blackmail Hearst for a 5% commission by claiming he possesses a letter containing Wolcott's admission to the murders. Hearst allows Wu to take over Chinese arrangements from Lee when he learns Lee is burning the bodies of dead prostitutes.

In season 3, Hearst remains in Deadwood — personally overseeing his interests in the camp. Obsessed with "the color," Hearst's ultimate goal is total control of Deadwood, or to have it destroyed if he cannot consolidate his power over the camp. To this end he murders several of his own miners when they attempt to form a union and is determined to have control over the Garret claim. He hires Pinkertons to come to the camp and actively stir up trouble. He tries to provoke Ellsworth to violence by shooting at Alma in the street, as a pretext to have Ellsworth killed. When this fails, Hearst has Ellsworth assassinated in his tent on Alma's claim. Trixie shoots Hearst in retaliation but the bullet goes into his shoulder and does not kill him.

Alma is forced into selling the claim to Hearst, and he decides to leave the camp shortly afterward. He is fooled by Al one last time when Al kills Jen, a prostitute resembling Trixie, to save Trixie from death. Hearst leaves camp, charging Tolliver with his "other-than-mining interests," as said by Tolliver with disdain.

In Deadwood: The Movie, Hearst, now a Senator from California, returns to town for statehood celebrations. His attempt to buy Charlie Utter's land in order to set up telephone poles fails, and he has Utter murdered. Much of the town reacts with anger, and Alma outbids him for the land at a later auction. Hearst also discovers Al's previous deception and attempts to have Trixie arrested, but Bullock instead takes him into custody for Utter's death. Hearst is nearly killed by a furious mob before Bullock saves him and drags him into a jail cell by his ear.

== Recurring characters ==
=== Brom Garret ===
Brom Garret (Timothy Omundson) is Alma's husband and a claim seeker. Brom is a son to the wealthy New York Garret family. He is overly enthusiastic about gold mining, focusing on panning rather than mining. He is fooled by Swearengen into buying a supposedly worthless plot of land from a mutual acquaintance for $20,000. When Brom discovers the panning in the plot are barren, he threatens Swearengen that he will hire Pinkerton Detectives to investigate unless his $20,000 is returned. Al convinces Brom to look at the mining rights on the plot's mountain, sending Dan Dority to assist him. When Brom and Dority climb the mountain, Dority throws him to his death. Brom Garret's death is witnessed by Whitney Ellsworth and acts as one of the inciting incidents of the entire series.

=== Jack McCall ===
Jack McCall (Garret Dillahunt) is a drunkard who shoots Hickok in the back of the head as he plays poker. McCall is found not guilty by a hurried and impromptu court of locals on the grounds that he was merely avenging the prior murder of his brother by Hickok; but due to Hickok's high regard and the presence of many of Hickok's good friends in town, McCall is made to realize it is best to leave. McCall is later tracked down and brought to Yankton, Dakota Territory for prosecution by Seth Bullock and Charlie Utter. It is assumed McCall is executed some time later.

Both Jack McCall and Francis Wolcott, the George Hearst advance agent in Deadwood in season 2, are portrayed by the same actor.

=== Reverend Smith ===
Reverend Henry Weston Smith (Ray McKinnon) is a kind Christian minister who, among other tasks, leads the funerals of many of the individuals who die in the course of the first season. Smith was a field nurse in the Civil War, serving at Shiloh and 2nd Manassas, until he received a "sign from God." He subsequently left his wife and children and became a reverend in Deadwood.

When the plague arrives in camp, Smith assists Calamity Jane and Doc Cochran in the "pest tent" (quarantine section). Over the course of the first season, Smith suffers from a brain tumor that gradually causes his mental and physical collapse. He suffers from several seizures and hallucinations, develops a deformation of his left eye, and at one point doubts if Star and Bullock are his friends or just demons disguised as his friends. As his condition deteriorates he suffers memory lapses and headaches, later becoming bedridden and housed at the prostitutes' quarters in The Gem, before Al takes his life in an act of mercy. Dan Dority and Johnny Burns watch as Al closes the reverend's eyes after saying, "You can go now, brother."

=== Dolly ===
Dolly (Ashleigh Kizer) is a prostitute at the Gem Saloon. Swearengen begins a relationship with her after Trixie leaves his employ. Although he doesn't harbor the same affection for her as Trixie, Swearengen confides his innermost vulnerabilities with Dolly.

=== Eddie Sawyer ===
Eddie Sawyer (Ricky Jay) appears in the first season. A card sharp at Cy Tolliver's Bella Union saloon, Sawyer has worked with Tolliver for 17 years and is one of Cy's most reliable hands. He becomes disillusioned by his boss's callousness at sending Andy Cramed to die in the woods and torturing two young thieves, skulking around the Bella Union and embarrassing Tolliver at a town meeting. He decides to rob Cy in retaliation, in part to fund Joanie Stubbs in opening her own brothel. In the second season, Tolliver reveals that he knew Eddie had been stealing but that he had left the camp before Cy could take any form of retaliation.

=== Leon ===
Leon (Larry Cedar), Cy Tolliver's chief informant and lackey, is addicted to opium. Formerly employed as a double agent to give Swearengen false information, he and the dope fiend Jimmy Irons rob and murder Mr. Wu's opium courier, leading to Jimmy being fed to Wu's pigs. Leon works to incite anti-Chinese sentiment in the camp following this event, though more out of fear of Cy than anything else, and now serves as Tolliver's eyes around town. He begins to deal dope to Alma Garret in Season 3 and Tolliver finds out. Afraid that he will be implicated in any attempt to murder Alma, he stops dealing to her soon after. He was meant to be a great card sharp before he became an opium addict, according to Cy.

In the final episode of Season 3, Cy Tolliver, in a fit of frustration over Hearst's treatment of him, stabs Leon in the leg. The knife cuts through his femoral artery, and Leon soon bleeds to death on Tolliver's balcony. Dazed from blood loss in his dying moments, Leon still tries to compliment Cy, leading Tolliver to comment, "If those were your last words, tell the Lord you died stupid."

=== Andy Cramed ===
Andy Cramed (Zach Grenier) is a conman who has often worked with Cy Tolliver and is set to do so again until he arrives in Deadwood suffering from smallpox. He is taken to the woods and left to die on Tolliver's orders, but is discovered by Jane. After his convalescence in the smallpox tent and aiding in the distribution of the vaccine, he leaves.

He eventually returns as a self-proclaimed minister in the second season, conducting the funeral service of William Bullock and the marriage of Alma and Ellsworth. In the second-season finale he attacks Tolliver for mocking God and his newfound faith in front of him, stabbing him in the gut and walking away. He attempts to make recompense in Season 3 by asking for Tolliver's forgiveness. Tolliver threatens him with a gun, ranting about redemption, but Leon interrupts them and Cramed leaves, disgusted with Tolliver's behavior.

=== Richardson ===
Richardson (Ralph Richeson) is an unkempt, seemingly simple-minded employee at the Grand Central Hotel whose duties include cleaning and cooking. He rarely speaks and is quite inarticulate on the occasions that he does, in sharp contrast to his talkative employer, E. B. Farnum. Richardson has a strange fixation with an old deer's antler given to him absentmindedly by Alma (whom he tells "I like you. You're purdy"). He clings to the antler when frightened, carries it when sent by Farnum on an errand, and sometimes raises it to a pair of larger antlers in prayer.

Farnum detests Richardson, regards him as mentally feeble, and frequently chastises him, sometimes comparing him to a frog or grotesque beast, or calling him egg-hatched; yet, ironically, Richardson is the only person in whom Farnum can totally confide. Late in the show's run, some indications are given that Richardson is not the completely uneducated idiot he seems: he is seen reading a newspaper in private, and reveals himself as an adept juggler at the newly opened theater's amateur night. In Season 3, his job as the Grand Central Hotel's cook is taken over by Aunt Lou, though Richardson continues as her assistant.

Though originally hired as an extra, Richardson was made a more prominent character after producer David Milch and the writers found they liked his eccentric performance in early scenes. The role marked Ralph Richeson's first on-screen speaking credit as an actor.

=== Maddie ===
Maddie (Alice Krige) is a "Madame" of considerable reputation in the West, known both to Cy Tolliver and Francis Wolcott. When Joanie Stubbs decides to set up her own brothel, the Chez Amis, she invites Maddie to join in the enterprise as her partner. Maddie and her three prostitutes arrive in Deadwood in the first episode of Season 2 on the same stagecoach as Mrs. Bullock and William Bullock. She had decided to join Joanie when she learned that Mr. Wolcott would soon be moving to Deadwood as the frontman for George Hearst. Evidently aware of Wolcott's predilection for killing prostitutes from her prior experiences at one of Hearst's camps, likely Montana, she spurs forward his murderous tendencies against a favored young courtesan with expectations of funding a "long and comfortable" retirement through extortion. Though Wolcott does indeed slaughter a pair of Chez Amis prostitutes, her attempt at blackmail fails when he kills the madam to ensure her silence.

=== Miss Isringhausen ===
Alice Isringhausen (Sarah Paulson) is hired from back East by Alma Garret to tutor Sofia. Isringhausen remains unobtrusively in the background with Sofia throughout most of the drama between Alma and Seth. After Seth's family suddenly arrives, in Alma's newly upset state, Alma and Isringhausen have an argument over Alma's perception of Isringhausen's lack of warmth towards the girl, and she is fired. Isringhausen does not leave town, however, and instead begins to spread tales of Alma having been behind Swearengen's murder of Brom Garret. Swearengen quickly realizes that she is not what she seems to be, and she confirms that she was indeed sent by Mr. Garret's family to wrest control of what promises to be a lucrative claim away from Alma, by any means necessary. Swearengen appears to go along with the plan to frame Alma, but correctly identifies Isringhausen as a Pinkerton, whom he despises as inferior to even his own admittedly low moral standards, and, more importantly, he calculates that the entrance of large and powerful interests from outside the camp would be inimical to his own interests. Therefore, he makes plans with Bullock to double cross Isringhausen by getting her to document her scheme rather than exposing it. Swearengen ultimately bribes her to leave town.

Alice often claims light-heartedly and deceitfully to be a former steamboat captain on the Mississippi. She also has several romantic encounters with Silas Adams, who is also staying at the Grand Central Hotel.

=== Lila ===
Lila (Meghan Glennon) is a prostitute at the Bella Union and friend of Joanie Stubbs. Lila appears as charismatic and content to begin with but eventually succumbs to drug addiction, much to Joanie's frustration.

=== Hawkeye ===
Hawkeye (played by Monty "Hawkeye" Henson) is Silas Adams' assistant. He first appears in Season 1 having travelled with Adams to Deadwood. Thereafter he acts as a courier and (somewhat lazy) messenger for Adams.

=== Commissioner Jarry ===
Commissioner Hugo Jarry (Stephen Tobolowsky) is the representative of Yankton in the camp. Bullock must protect him from an enraged mob of prospectors who fear their gold claims will be invalidated when the camp is incorporated into Dakota. Swearengen, with the assistance of Bullock, Star, and Adams, forces Jarry to make concessions to Deadwood in order to outbid Montana on annexation. He returns in Season 3 having bought the votes of soldiers for Hearst. He implies to Adams he may be in some trouble for having defrauded the county of money intended for the reservations for his own gain.

=== Hostetler ===
Arnette Hostetler (Richard Gant) runs the livery stable. Hostetler is, by default, the primary source of company for Samuel Fields, by virtue of being the only other black man in camp, which leads to much friction between their conflicting personalities. When Fields becomes an unwitting victim of an angry mob led by a hooligan seeking to take out their frustration at the possibility of being bilked out of their claims, Hostetler provides brief shelter to him, and then immediately betrays him when faced with threat of violence. Fields, for his part, never blames him for this, saying "I'd have done the same thing, only quicker."

He is forced to later flee the camp when a horse brought to him by Samuel tramples William Bullock to death. They later bring the horse back to camp in attempt to seek forgiveness from Bullock. In their absence, Steve has taken over the Livery. Bullock is forced to broker a deal between the two and Hostetler agrees to sell Steve the livery and leave camp. But Steve continually insults and verbally abuses Hostetler throughout the transaction. He finally pushes him over the brink and Hostetler shoots himself in the head, something he attempted once before in earlier appearances, having been driven "crazy with pride," according to Samuel Fields.

=== Steve Fields ===
Steve "the Drunk" Fields (Michael Harney) is one of the camp's many drunks as well as being a notorious loudmouth and scathing racist. He is a continual nuisance at Tom Nuttall's No. 10 Saloon. Steve Fields leads a lynch mob against Commissioner Jarry in Season 2. After failing to get Jarry, he proceeds to lead the mob against "Nigger General" Samuel Fields. Bullock disperses the lynch mob, and later threatens and beats Steve on account of his behavior. Steve, seeking revenge, secretly masturbates onto Bullock's horse. He is caught by Hostetler, who plans on killing him, but Samuel walks in on the two and persuades Hostetler to let Steve live, providing he recognizes all men are God's children, and signs a board admitting that he abused Bullock's horse.

Steve later hurts his back as a wild horse tramples him and William Bullock. When Hostetler leaves town to capture the wild horse which escaped while under his care, Steve takes over the livery, but hostilities continue when Hostetler returns. Bullock negotiates the sale of the livery to Steve. After the deal is complete, Steve demands the board he signed back from Hostetler. He continues to verbally abuse Hostetler as they are searching for the board. The board is found, but the writing, having been in chalk, has become illegible. Steve calls Hostetler a liar, and his verbal abuse drives Hostetler, already grieved over the death of William, to kill himself with his gun. The next day, Steve plans to remove one of the horseshoes from Samuel's horse, so that he might have time to persuade him to stay in his employ at the livery. However, Samuel finds Steve bloodied and stupefied, apparently kicked in the head by the horse. Samuel delays his own plans to leave, and reluctantly cares for Steve.

=== Mose Manuel ===
Mose Manuel (Pruitt Taylor Vince) owns a gold claim which Wolcott wishes to buy on behalf of Hearst. Knowing he must sell, he tries to persuade his brother that he will mismanage the operation and ought to sell. When he refuses, Mose murders him. The death of his brother weighs on him, however, and Mose becomes a continuing problem for Cy Tolliver as his already belligerent attitude worsens. Wolcott provokes him and Tolliver's men shoot him down. But because of his immense size, the bullets do not penetrate his vital organs and Cochran is able to save his life. He recovers on the Chez Ami's floor and once healed remains there as watchman, a changed man from his near death experience.

=== Blazanov ===
Blazanov (Pasha D. Lychnikoff) is Deadwood's telegraph operator and a Russian immigrant. He feels a scrupulous dedication to his responsibility to not reveal the private information that he translates and delivers, resisting both Dority's attempts to intimidate him and Farnum's attempts to bribe him into revealing private information. Later, he makes exceptions to the rules as he sees the danger Hearst poses to Deadwood. At one point, he discusses how his parents had sacrificed financially to send him to school, and how they were subsequently murdered by thugs comparable to Hearst's goons. Blazanov's telegraph office is located in the newspaper office of A.W. Merrick, and the two become close friends.

=== Captain Joe Turner ===
Captain Joseph "Joe" Turner (Allan Graf) is an enforcer and bodyguard to George Hearst. He is first seen in the second season ruthlessly safeguarding Hearst's mining operation and dealing with thieves, often delivering letters to Swearengen. The captain defeated or killed a man named Leonard in single combat in Star City, a fight that Hearst later recalled for the captain in caution. He helps Hearst assault Swearengen, and later taunts Swearengen's muscleman Dan Dority into a public brawl, a fight set up to prove Hearst's superiority over Swearengen. Despite Turner initially gaining the upper hand, Dority tears out Turner's left eye in a move of desperation before beating him to death with a stove-length.

=== Claudia ===
Claudia (Cynthia Ettinger) arrives in the third season as part of Langrishe's theater troupe. She has a sexual relationship with Con Stapleton and is jealous of Langrishe's relationships with Josiane and Mary.

=== Jack Langrishe ===
Jack Langrishe (Brian Cox) is a theater operator and leader of a troupe of traveling actors who come to settle in Deadwood long-term early in the third season. In Deadwood, which lacks any but the lowest forms of entertainment, he seeks both financial opportunity and a chance to bring art and culture to the town. He is a close, longtime friend of Al Swearengen. Langrishe's accent and name hint at Irish origins.

Possessing a dry wit, and prone to both flattery and self-deprecation, the flamboyant Langrishe charms most of the people he meets, including Martha, Alma, and Merrick. Scouting a location for his theater, he decides that Joanie's former brothel, the Chez Amis, now being used as a schoolhouse, would be perfect if redecorated. He makes her a generous offer to sell the building to him, and she accepts, on the condition that Langrishe have a new schoolhouse built at his own expense, something he happily agrees with. The theater opens some days later in the renovated Chez Amis, with a very successful amateur night.

Al keeps Langrishe aware of the machinations between himself and Hearst. Langrishe discovers that Hearst suffers from back pain, and talks him into trying out a new form of treatment, administered by Langrishe himself in the form of pulls, prods, and thrusts. Later, he suggests to an interested Al the possibility of using these time-consuming but useless back treatments as a way of occupying Hearst's time.

Langrishe is based on the historical theater owner of the same name.

=== Jen ===
Jen (Jennifer Lutheran) is one of Swearengen's prostitutes in the Gem Saloon. Petite, blonde, pretty, she is demure in a way that belies her occupation. She is learning to read with the help of Johnny Burns, who has a growing affection for her. He defends her against the coarseness of Morgan Earp and stands up to Swearengen when Al schemes to appease Hearst's demand for the death of Trixie by killing Jen and substituting her body for Trixie's. Johnny stands up to Al but fails later by the hands of Dan and the ruse is carried out successfully.

== Guest characters ==
=== Wyatt Earp ===
Wyatt Earp (Gale Harold) rides into camp with his brother Morgan, supposedly after saving a stagecoach from robbery, although Earp later confesses to making the story up to enhance their reputation. Upon his arrival he is greeted by Sheriff Bullock. Wyatt tells him that he was a lawman in Kansas, but has come to camp to work a timber lease he won in cards. Wyatt and Morgan are hired by Cy Tolliver as gunmen but are fired when they see Hearst bring in the Pinkertons. After the Earps have a confrontation with one of Hearst's gunmen and find out that the timber lease is worth nothing, Sheriff Bullock tells Wyatt and Morgan that it is best they move on. Wyatt and Morgan leave town as allies, if not friends, of Bullock.

=== Morgan Earp ===
Morgan Earp (Austin Nichols) rides into camp with Wyatt after allegedly saving a stagecoach. Morgan has a knack for being a hothead and flirting with ladies. After some harsh words with one of Hearst's gunmen, he shoots him in the leg. Wyatt, fearing for his brother, pulls the gunman's pistol out of his holster and claims it's a fair fight. Morgan leaves town with Wyatt, after Bullock suggests they move on.
