= Deadwood (Deadwood episode) =

- Deadwood episode
- Episode no.: Season 1 Episode 1
- Directed by: Walter Hill
- Written by: David Milch
- Cinematography by: Lloyd Ahern II
- Editing by: Freeman A. Davies
- Original air date: March 21, 2004
- Running time: 62 minutes

Episode chronology
| ← Previous — | Next → "Deep Water" |

"Deadwood" is the first episode of the first season of the HBO original series of the same name. The episode was written by David Milch and directed by Walter Hill. It first aired on March 21, 2004.

Hill won the Emmy Award for Outstanding Directing for the episode, and Milch was nominated for an Emmy Award for Outstanding Writing.

== Plot ==
Seth Bullock, a Montana Territory marshal, is planning to leave for Deadwood, a camp on Sioux land in the Dakota Territory, to open a hardware store there with his business partner, Sol Star. While watching over an inmate sentenced to death for stealing a horse, they are interrupted by a drunken posse. Rather than hand him over to the angry mob, Bullock takes the man outside, grants him his last words, and hangs him on the front porch.

Upon arrival in Deadwood, Star and Bullock rent a vacant lot from Dan Dority, who tells them that payment is due every morning to Al Swearengen, the proprietor of the Gem Saloon, a local brothel.

At the Gem, prostitute Trixie shoots a customer in the head after he becomes abusive. The customer survives for twenty minutes, but dies shortly after the arrival of Doc Cochran. Swearengen ruthlessly beats Trixie, furious at the possible effects on his business. Meanwhile, Cochran and Johnny Burns deliver the corpse to Mr. Wu, an associate of Swearengen's and leader of Deadwood's Chinese community, who feeds it to his pigs.

Wild Bill Hickok, a famous gunslinger, arrives in Deadwood, along with his companions Charlie Utter and Calamity Jane. As Hickok plays poker in the saloon, Utter negotiates a fee for Hickok's regular appearance.

Brom Garret, a wealthy aspiring prospector, arrives from New York City. Swearengen enlists E. B. Farnum and Tim Driscoll in a conspiracy to swindle Garret into paying $14,000 for a pinched-out gold claim. Driscoll, hoping to secure a larger cut for himself, goes against the plan and pushes Garret to $20,000, irritating Al. As Driscoll is heavily indebted to the Gem, Swearengen pockets the money. Al orders Dan Dority to kill Driscoll to ensure his silence.

Garret returns to the local hotel and tells his wife, Alma Garret about the purchase of the gold claim. Alma is addicted to laudanum, and responds with passive disinterest.

News of a massacre arrives in Deadwood: an entire family, a disoriented man says, has been killed by Sioux on the road. When pressed, the man says he saw two dead children, but townspeople say the family had three children. Hickok and Bullock put together a party to search for the missing child. Fearing a major disruption of business, Swearengen offers up free alcohol and a discount on prostitution to those that stay behind with him. As they leave the saloon, Bullock confides to Hickok his suspicions about the story.

The search party finds a ransacked wagon, the mutilated family, and young Sofia Metz, wounded but alive, in a nearby bush. Meanwhile, at the Gem, Dority murders Tim Driscoll.

As dawn breaks, the search party returns to town. Calamity Jane brings Sofia to Doc Cochran. Hickok and Bullock confront the man who brought the news, accusing him of staging the raid to line his own pockets. The man draws his gun, but is shot dead by Hickcok. Swearengen observes the duel from the balcony of the Gem, then goes to bed with a bruised Trixie.

== Production ==
=== Development and casting ===
Creator David Milch pitched to HBO a series set in Ancient Rome, exploring the introduction of law and order to a civilization. When HBO executives Chris Albrecht and Carolyn Strauss suggested that he change his setting due to the network already having Rome in development, Milch transposed the themes to 1800s Deadwood. In a later interview, Milch reflected, "It had seemed to me that the symbol of the cross as the organizing principle of behavior could be transliterated to the symbol of the badge, as a similar organizing principle." Milch wrote the role of Al Swearengen with Ed O'Neill in mind, having worked with him on the CBS series Big Apple, but executives were reluctant to build a series around an actor still associated with his lead role in Married... with Children. Powers Boothe was then cast in the role but was forced to withdraw due to illness, leading to the casting of Ian McShane. After Boothe recovered, he began playing Cy Tolliver on the series, a character introduced in the third episode of the first season.

=== Credits ===
The credited starring cast consists of Timothy Olyphant (Seth Bullock), Ian McShane (Al Swearengen), Molly Parker (Alma Garret), Jim Beaver (Whitney Ellsworth), Brad Dourif (Doc Cochran), John Hawkes (Sol Star), Paula Malcomson (Trixie), Leon Rippy (Tom Nuttall), William Sanderson (E. B. Farnum), Robin Weigert (Calamity Jane), W. Earl Brown (Dan Dority), Dayton Callie (Charlie Utter), and Keith Carradine (Wild Bill Hickok).

==== Guest stars ====
- Jeffrey Jones as A. W. Merrick
- Timothy Omundson as Brom Garret
- Garret Dillahunt as Jack McCall
- Ray McKinnon as Reverend Smith
- Sean Bridgers as Johnny Burns
- Geri Jewell as Jewel
- Keone Young as Mr. Wu
- Jamie McShane as Ned Mason
- Dan Hildebrand as Tim Driscoll
- Michael Hagerty as Loud Wagoneer
- Christopher Darga as Byron Sampson
- James Parks as Clell Watson

== Awards ==
Director Walter Hill won the Primetime Emmy Award for Outstanding Directing for a Drama Series for "Deadwood", while writer David Milch received a Primetime Emmy Award for Outstanding Writing for a Drama Series nomination. Hill also won the Directors Guild of America Award for Outstanding Directing – Drama Series.
