= Deadwood: The Movie =

2019 American TV film

- Television release poster
- Genre: Western
- Written by: David Milch
- Directed by: Daniel Minahan
- Starring: Timothy Olyphant; Ian McShane; Molly Parker; Paula Malcomson; W. Earl Brown; Dayton Callie; Kim Dickens; Brad Dourif; Anna Gunn; John Hawkes; Leon Rippy; William Sanderson; Robin Weigert; Brent Sexton; Sean Bridgers; Franklyn Ajaye; Gerald McRaney; Jeffrey Jones; Keone Young
- Music by: Reinhold Heil; Johnny Klimek
- Country of origin: United States
- Original language: English

Production
- Executive producers: David Milch; Carolyn Strauss; Daniel Minahan; Gregg Fienberg; Scott Stephens; Ian McShane; Timothy Olyphant
- Cinematography: David Klein
- Editors: Erick Fefferman; Martin Nicholson
- Running time: 110 minutes
- Production companies: HBO Films; Red Board Productions; The Mighty Mint
- Budget: $20.7 million

Original release
- Network: HBO
- Release: May 31, 2019

Deadwood: The Movie is a 2019 American Western television film directed by Daniel Minahan and written by David Milch for HBO. It is a continuation of the television series of the same name, which was created by Milch and ran for three seasons from 2004 to 2006. The film reunites the majority of the show's large ensemble cast, including Timothy Olyphant, Ian McShane, Molly Parker, Paula Malcomson, John Hawkes, and Gerald McRaney, and premiered on May 31, 2019.

== Plot ==
In 1889, as South Dakota is celebrating its statehood, past and present residents of Deadwood are taking part in the celebrations. The widow Alma Garret Ellsworth has returned to the town with her ward Sofia, while Calamity Jane has returned to make amends with her old flame Joanie Stubbs, who has taken over the Bella Union gambling hall and bordello following Cy Tolliver's death. Also attending is George Hearst, now a United States senator, who has returned to Deadwood to purchase land from Charlie Utter. Utter's land is interfering with the installation of telephone lines in which Hearst has invested.

Trixie, pregnant with Sol Star's child, insults Hearst from her balcony, causing Hearst to realize he was deceived by Al Swearengen when he demanded that Trixie be killed years earlier, Swearengen having cut the throat of an innocent Trixie look-alike to accomplish that deception. Hearst visits Swearengen, who is ailing due to liver failure, and demands his assistance in acquiring Utter's land in exchange for not taking revenge against Trixie.

Utter consults with U.S. Marshal Seth Bullock about his dealings with Hearst. Bullock reminds Utter of what Hearst is capable of when he is refused. Hearst meets Utter on his land and tries to make a deal but Utter declines to sell. Later that night Bullock and his deputy Harry Manning search for Utter and find him murdered on his land. Bullock finds Samuel Fields nearby, who reveals that he saw what happened but refuses to testify out of fear. Bullock places Fields under guard at the marshal's office and challenges Hearst, accusing him of the murder of his friend.

E.B. Farnum spies on Hearst and witnesses him meeting with Smith and Seacrest, the gunmen he hired to kill Utter. Hearst informs them of Fields' situation and orders them to kill him. Farnum informs Bullock of this at an auction for Utter's property, during which Alma outbids Hearst.

The hitmen arrive at the marshal's office, where Manning is revealed as Hearst's informant. The hitmen attempt to lynch Fields but are stopped by Bullock, who kills Seacrest and captures Smith. Fields confirms that they are the men who killed Utter. Bullock confronts Hearst, whose men abruptly kill Smith before he can identify Hearst as his employer, thus setting off a brief gunfight in which several of Hearst's men are killed and Johnny Burns is injured. Hearst warns Bullock that he is coming for him but Bullock remains undeterred.

Fearful for the life of Trixie and their newborn son, Sol takes his family to the Bullock home. While discussing their predicament, Trixie agrees to marry Sol. The following day, their wedding is held at the Gem Saloon, where Swearengen gives Trixie away. Before the wedding Swearengen meets privately with Sol and Trixie and informs them that he is leaving Trixie the Gem upon his death and advises Sol to run for office.

During the celebrations Alma sadly accepts that she and Bullock can't be together while Bullock indicates that he is happy with his family. Hearst interrupts the wedding celebrations with two deputies who have come to arrest Trixie for her attempted murder of Hearst in 1877. Bullock points out that they have no jurisdiction in Deadwood and he instead arrests Hearst. On the way to jail, a mob led by Calamity Jane attacks Hearst, viciously beating him. Bullock nearly allows the mob to kill Hearst before having a change of heart when he sees his wife and family. Bullock fires his gun in the air threatening to arrest the mob and leads the badly wounded Hearst to the jail. After arriving in the marshal's office, Bullock escorts Hearst by the ear to a cell. Calamity Jane notices Manning behaving strangely, follows him into the marshal's office and kills him before he can shoot Bullock in the back.

Bullock discusses the circumstances of Utter's death with Fields, who tells him that Utter was singing and at peace at the moment of his death, giving Bullock a sense of closure. Returning home, he embraces his wife as snow begins to fall on Deadwood. Trixie returns to the Gem to care for Swearengen. Trixie holds Swearengen's hand and begins reciting the Lord's Prayer, "Our Father, which art in Heaven," to which Swearengen replies, "Let Him fucking stay there."

== Cast ==
The cast includes:

- Timothy Olyphant as Seth Bullock
- Ian McShane as Al Swearengen
- Molly Parker as Alma Ellsworth
- Paula Malcomson as Trixie
- W. Earl Brown as Dan Dority
- Dayton Callie as Charlie Utter
- Kim Dickens as Joanie Stubbs
- Brad Dourif as Doc Cochran
- Anna Gunn as Martha Bullock
- John Hawkes as Sol Star
- Gerald McRaney as Senator George Hearst
- Leon Rippy as Tom Nuttall
- William Sanderson as E. B. Farnum
- Robin Weigert as Calamity Jane
- Brent Sexton as Harry Manning
- Sean Bridgers as Johnny Burns
- Geri Jewell as Jewel
- Jeffrey Jones as A. W. Merrick
- Franklyn Ajaye as Samuel Fields
- Keone Young as Mr. Wu
- Peter Jason as Con Stapleton
- Cleo King as Aunt Lou
- Tony Curran as James Smith
- Jade Pettyjohn as Caroline Woolgarden
- Lily Keene as Sofia Ellsworth
- Don Swayze as Dennis Seacrest
- Alan Ko as Mengyao
- Luke Patrick Dodge as Stanley Bullock
- Noelle E Parker as Margaret Bullock
- Leticia Lagutenko as Florence Bullock
- Van Epperson as Jerry
- Bryan Veronneau as Hearst Employee

Powers Boothe, Ricky Jay, and Ralph Richeson died between the conclusion of the series and production of the film. Boothe's small role in an early version of the script was written out. Titus Welliver, who portrayed Silas Adams, was unable to appear in the film due to scheduling conflicts as he was filming his Amazon Prime series Bosch. Garret Dillahunt and Larry Cedar, who played characters who were killed in the original series, returned as background characters; Dillahunt plays a drunk who throws something at Hearst, yelling: "Hope you die in the street, like my dad did!"

== Production ==
=== Development ===
Following the surprise cancellation of Deadwood, on June 5, 2006, HBO and creator David Milch agreed to make a pair of two-hour television films in place of a fourth season. On July 12, 2007, HBO executives admitted that producing the telefilms would be difficult and put the chances of them ever being made at "50–50." Actor Ian McShane claimed in an interview on October 1, 2007, that the show's sets were due to be dismantled and that the movies would not be made; actors Jim Beaver and W. Earl Brown commented a day later that they considered the series to be over.

On August 12, 2015, it was reported that talks between HBO and Milch had resumed regarding a Deadwood film. In January 2016, HBO gave Milch the green-light to write a script for the film. On April 19, 2017, McShane announced that Milch had submitted a script for a two-hour Deadwood movie to HBO, saying "[A] two-hour movie script has been delivered to HBO. If they don't deliver [a finished product], blame them." On November 12, 2017, TVLine reported that the Deadwood movie was set to begin production in fall 2018, although HBO had not officially greenlit the project.

On July 25, 2018, HBO confirmed that a Deadwood movie had been greenlit and that Daniel Minahan, who directed four episodes in the series' original run, would direct the film, with production set to begin in October 2018. According to research requested by the producers, the film was to be set in 1889, approximately 10 years after the end of season 3. On August 21, 2018, W. Earl Brown confirmed that virtually everyone in the main cast would be returning; however, the characters played by Powers Boothe and Ralph Richeson, who had since died, would not be recast. "Everyone from the main cast who still draws air, with the exception of Silas Adams" (played by Titus Welliver) would return, Brown said. Production on the film would begin on October 5, 2018, according to Brown.

=== Filming ===
On November 5, 2018, HBO announced that the film had begun production. The returns of cast members Ian McShane, Timothy Olyphant, Molly Parker, Paula Malcomson, John Hawkes, Anna Gunn, Dayton Callie, Brad Dourif, Robin Weigert, W. Earl Brown, William Sanderson, Kim Dickens, and Gerald McRaney were confirmed, while Jade Pettyjohn and Lily Keene (taking on the role played by Bree Seanna Wall in the original series) were added to the cast.

Nic Pizzolatto revealed in December 2018 that he had helped Milch write the screenplay. The show's mining town was recreated by production designer Maria Caso and was filmed on the same sets as Westworld. Milch, whose Alzheimer's diagnosis was made public in April 2019, took a hands-off approach to the production of the film; he relied on director Daniel Minahan and co-executive producer/writer Regina Corrado to see to the details. The first photos of the production were released on December 19, 2018. An accompanying interview with the film's executive producer Carolyn Strauss was released that day, in which she characterized the film as being about "the passage of time. The toll of time on people. It's mellowed some people and hardened others. And it's about the town's maturing and becoming part of the Union and what that event sets in motion, in a very personal way for the people that it brings in town and what ensues. The time has taken its greatest toll on [Al] Swearengen. He's the person who really drove so much of the life of the town and there's a sense of that power waning somewhat, and what ensues of that is a big part of the story."

The first footage from the film was released on February 24, 2019, during a trailer announcing the 2019 lineup of upcoming films and series for HBO. A full trailer was released on April 25, 2019.

== Reception ==
=== Critical response ===
The film has gained critical acclaim. Review aggregator website Rotten Tomatoes reports the film holds a 98% approval rating based on 89 reviews, with an average rating of 8.3/10. The site's critical consensus reads, "A triumphant coda to a beloved series, Deadwood: The Movie will satisfy fans longing for a little f---ing closure." On Metacritic, the film has a weighted average score of 86 out of 100 based on 29 critics, indicating "universal acclaim".

Brian Tallerico of RogerEbert.com gave it a highly positive review, rating it four out of four stars. He praised the direction by Daniel Minahan, writing, "Some of the best imagery in the entire arc of the show is right here in this movie." He also praised David Milch's writing, stating, "It feels like the product of a creator who fully understands that this is his last creation, but even he refuses to end on an easy note. There can be closure without sentimentality." He called it "a rich 110 minutes of filmmaking that rewards fans without pandering to them."

Ben Travers of IndieWire gave it an "A−" grade and called the film "a bittersweet and brutally honest triumph". He also wrote that the final line of the film "is one of the greatest ever written".

=== Ratings ===
In its original broadcast on May 31, 2019, on HBO, the film received 931,000 viewers.

=== Accolades ===
Award	Year (Note: The listed year refers to the date of the ceremony, not necessarily the year in which the corresponding season or episode aired.)	Category	Nominee(s)	Result	Ref.
ADG Excellence in Production Design Awards	2020	Excellence in Production Design for a Television Movie or Limited Series	Maria Caso, Jason Garner, David Potts, Robert Broadfoot, Jeff Ozimek, Craig Ruda, Brent Cottrell-Mannon	Nominated	
Artios Awards	2020	Outstanding Achievement in Casting – Feature – Non-Theatrical Release	Junie Lowry Johnson, Libby Goldstein, Josh Ropiequet	Nominated	
Cinema Audio Society Awards	2020	Outstanding Achievement in Sound Mixing for Television Movie or Limited Series	John W. Cook II, William Freesh, Geoffrey Patterson, Paul Parker, Jeff Gomillion	Nominated	
Critics' Choice Awards	2020	Best Movie Made for Television	Deadwood: The Movie	Nominated	
GLAAD Media Awards	2020	Outstanding TV Movie	Deadwood: The Movie	Nominated	
Golden Reel Awards	2020	Outstanding Achievement in Sound Editing – Sound Effects, Foley, Music, Dialogue and ADR for Non-Theatrical Feature Film Broadcast Media	Daniel Colman, Mandell Winter, Ben Cook, Eryne Prine, Brian Armstrong, Shane Hayes, Bernard Weiser, Dhyana Carlton-Tims, Rob Chen, Stephanie Gangel, Micha Liberman, Jillinda Palmer	Nominated	
Guild of Music Supervisors Awards	2020	Best Music Supervision for Television Movie	Evyen J. Klean, Jennifer Reeve	Nominated	
HPA Awards	2019	Outstanding Sound – Episodic or Non-theatrical Feature	John W. Cook II, William Freesh, Daniel Colman, Mandell Winter, Ben Cook, Micha Liberman	Nominated	
Make-Up Artists and Hair Stylists Guild Awards	2020	Television Special, One Hour or More Live Program Series or Movie Made for Television – Best Period and/or Character Make-Up	Lana Horochowski, Maurine Burke, Lesa Nielsen Duff	Nominated	
Make-Up Artists and Hair Stylists Guild Awards	2020	Television Special, One Hour or More Live Program Series or Movie Made for Television – Best Period and/or Character Hair Styling	Melissa Yonkey, Laine Trzinski, Jose Zamora	Won	
Primetime Emmy Awards	2019	Outstanding Television Movie	Deadwood: The Movie (Note: Nominees: David Milch, Carolyn Strauss, Gregg Fienberg, Scott Stephens, Daniel Minahan, Ian McShane, Timothy Olyphant, Regina Corrado, Nichole Beattie, Mark Tobey)	Nominated	
Primetime Creative Arts Emmy Awards	2019	Outstanding Cinematography for a Limited Series or Movie	David Klein	Nominated	
Primetime Creative Arts Emmy Awards	2019	Outstanding Hairstyling for a Limited Series or Movie	Melissa Yonkey, Laine Trzinski, Jose Zamora	Nominated	
Primetime Creative Arts Emmy Awards	2019	Outstanding Makeup for a Limited Series or Movie (Non-Prosthetic)	Lana Horochowski, Maurine Burke, Lesa Nielsen Duff, Ron Pipes, Mary Kay Morse Witt	Nominated	
Primetime Creative Arts Emmy Awards	2019	Outstanding Single-Camera Picture Editing for a Limited Series or Movie	Martin Nicholson, Erick Fefferman	Nominated	
Primetime Creative Arts Emmy Awards	2019	Outstanding Sound Editing for a Limited Series, Movie, or Special	Daniel Coleman, Mandell Winter, Ben Cook, Eryne Prine, Brian Armstrong, Shane Hayes, Bernard Weiser, Dhyanna Carlton-Tim, Rob Chen, Micha Liberman, John Sievert, Stefan Fraticelli, Jason Charbonneau	Nominated	
Primetime Creative Arts Emmy Awards	2019	Outstanding Sound Mixing for a Limited Series or Movie	John W. Cook II, William Freesh, Geoffrey Patterson	Nominated	
Primetime Creative Arts Emmy Awards	2019	Outstanding Special Visual Effects	Eric Hayden, David Altenau, Alex Torres, Joseph Vincent Pike, Ian Northrop, Christopher Flynn, David Blumenfeld, Matthew Rappaport, David Rand	Nominated	
Producers Guild of America Awards	2020	Outstanding Producer of Streamed or Televised Motion Pictures	David Milch, Carolyn Strauss, Gregg Fienberg, Scott Stephens, Daniel Minahan, Ian McShane, Timothy Olyphant, Regina Corrado, Nichole Beattie, Mark Tobey	Nominated	
Satellite Awards	2019	Best Motion Picture Made for Television	Deadwood: The Movie	Nominated	
TCA Awards	2019	Outstanding Achievement in Movies, Miniseries and Specials	Deadwood: The Movie	Nominated	
Western Heritage Awards	2020	Film/Television, Theatrical Motion Picture	Deadwood: The Movie	Won	
