= Charlie Utter =

19th-century American trapper, guide, and prospector (1838–1915)

Charles H. Utter
- Born: March 14, 1838 near Niagara Falls, New York, U.S.
- Died: July 3, 1915 (aged 73); Panama City, Panama
- Other name: Colorado Charlie
- Occupations: Prospector, trapper, guide
- Known for: Friendship with Wild Bill Hickok; and Calamity Jane

Charles H. "Colorado Charlie" Utter (March 14, 1838 – July 3, 1915) was a figure of the American Wild West, best known as a great friend and companion of Wild Bill Hickok's. He was also friends with Calamity Jane.

== Early life ==
Utter was born in 1838 near Niagara Falls, New York, and grew up in Illinois, then traveled west in search of his fortune, becoming a trapper, guide, and prospector in Colorado in the 1860s. He met and married 15-year-old Matilda "Tily" Nash on September 30, 1866, in her parents' home in Empire, Clear Creek, Colorado Territory. Their marriage record lists Empire as his place of residence at the time of their marriage and by the 1870 Federal Census shows they had settled in nearby Georgetown, Colorado Territory.

== "Wild Bill" Hickok ==
Utter had been a close friend of Hickok's for some time previously, constantly watching to ensure that Hickok's weaknesses of alcohol and gambling would not bring Hickok to a bad end. Utter was not present on August 2, 1876, when Jack McCall fatally shot Hickok in the back of the head as Hickok played poker in a Deadwood saloon. Utter later claimed the body and placed a notice in the local newspaper, the Black Hills Pioneer, which read:

Died in Deadwood, Black Hills, August 2, 1876, from the effects of a pistol shot, J. B. Hickock [sic] (Wild Bill) formerly of Cheyenne, Wyoming. Funeral services will be held at Charlie Utter's Camp, on Thursday afternoon, August 3, 1876, at 3 o'clock, P. M. All are respectfully invited to attend.

Attendance at the funeral was heavy, and Utter had Hickok buried with a wooden grave marker which read:

Wild Bill, J. B. Hickock [sic] killed by the assassin Jack McCall in Deadwood, Black Hills, August 2d, 1876. Pard, we will meet again in the happy hunting ground to part no more. Good bye, Colorado Charlie, C. H. Utter.

Utter left for Colorado, but returned in 1879 to have Hickok reinterred, at Calamity Jane's urging, in a 10-foot-square plot at the Mount Moriah Cemetery, surrounded by a cast-iron fence and with an American flag in the ground.

Later that year, Utter opened a dance hall in Lead, a company town far more sedate than its raucous, rollicking neighbor, Deadwood. The dance hall's "boisterous music and scandalous cancan dancing" earned Charlie an appearance before the honorable Gideon C. Moody. Charlie was convicted of "operating a nuisance", but because he had already closed the establishment, Judge Moody sentenced him to a mere one hour in jail. He was also fined $50 on the charge of disturbing the peace.

Utter was back in Deadwood by the fall of the year. He opened another dance hall and also managed one of Deadwood's theaters. On September 26, 1879, a fire devastated Deadwood, destroying more than 300 buildings (including Charlie's dance hall and the theater he managed) and consuming the belongings of many inhabitants.

== After Deadwood ==
Following the destructive fire, Deadwood ceased to be a frontier town where fortunes could be built (or rebuilt) from nothing, and the newly impoverished left to try their luck in other gold rushes. Utter followed, first to Leadville, Colorado, in February 1880; then Durango, Colorado, having separated or divorced from his wife; then Socorro, New Mexico. There, he opened a saloon and was reported to have a relationship with faro dealer Minnie Fowler. Utter's biographer, Agnes Wright Spring, traced him to Panama in the early 1900s. By then losing his eyesight, he owned drugstores in Panama City and Colón. According to ship manifests, Utter made several trips back and forth between the United States and Panama in 1888, 1891, 1905, 1910, and 1912, each listing his occupation as a "druggist". He finally returned to Panama in 1913.

== Personality ==
Utter was 5 ft 6 in (168 cm) and was reported as being meticulous in his appearance, which was unusual for that place and time. He had long, black hair and a moustache, wore hand-tailored, fringed buckskins, fine linen shirts, beaded moccasins, and a large, silver belt buckle and carried a pair of gold, silver, and pearl ornamented pistols. He would allow nobody into his tent, even Hickok, on pain of being shot; in his tent, he slept under high-quality blankets, imported from California and carried with him mirrors, combs, razors, and whisk brooms. He was also known for his habit of bathing daily.

== In popular culture ==
Utter is portrayed by Dayton Callie in the HBO television series Deadwood and Deadwood: The Movie. Contrary to the meticulous historical Utter, the character is portrayed as rough-mannered and often unkempt in his appearance. The film, set in 1889, shows the character still living in Deadwood, although the historical Charlie Utter had moved back to Colorado in 1880. The film also shows Utter being murdered in 1889 by henchmen sent by George Hearst after Utter declined to sell his land to Hearst.
