= Jack Langrishe =

American politician (1825–1895)

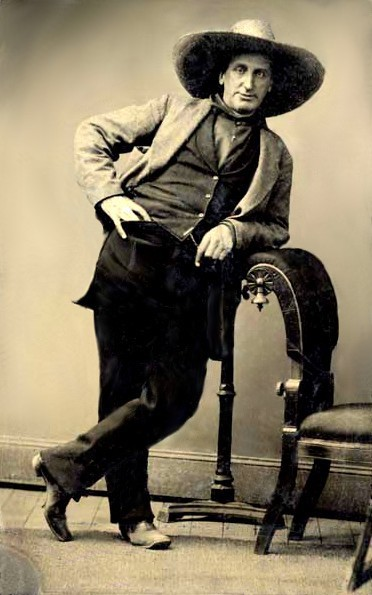
- Born: John Sewell Folds; September 24, 1825; Dublin, Ireland
- Died: December 12, 1895 (aged 70); Wardner, Idaho
- Occupations: actor, comedian, impresario

John Sewell Folds (September 24, 1825 – December 12, 1895), known professionally as Jack Langrishe, and nicknamed the Comedian of the Frontier, was an Irish-American actor and impresario who travelled extensively throughout the American West and later in life became one of the first State Senators of Idaho.

== Early life ==
John Sewell Folds was born in Dublin, Ireland on September 24, 1825. His father, also named John Sewell Folds, ran a print shop and Folds learned how to set type at a young age. A fire at his father's printing plant forced the family into bankruptcy and they immigrated to the United States. Landing in Boston on September 19, 1845, Folds sought to make his living in America as an actor.

He made his way to New York City and worked for Horace Greeley as a reporter and typesetter for the New York Tribune. Because of Greeley's dislike of the theater, Folds adopted the Langrishe stage name, taking the surname from that of a judge and policeman that he knew in Ireland.

== Acting ==
Langrishe was known to appear on stage at least once in his native Ireland, but made his New York acting debut on December 8, 1845, at the Chatham Theater in a play called The Irish Attorney as a character named Pierce O'Hara.

In 1847 he left New York City to become a full-time actor, comedian and magician. Two years later in 1849 he married fellow actor Jeannette Allen in Pittsburgh, Pennsylvania, both performed in J.H. Howell's Theatre company in Erie, Pennsylvania. By 1850 Langrishe was performing with his own troupe known as "Langrishe and Company" throughout New York, Ohio and southeastern Canada.

Langrishe and Company travelled westward in 1851, crossing Lake Michigan to play in Milwaukee, Wisconsin. Performances followed in Chicago, Illinois, and Kansas City, Missouri; his troupe continued to draw favorable reviews in the Midwest as late as 1859 until the troupe began running out of money due to salaries and extensive wardrobes.

Arriving in Central City, Colorado in 1860, Langrishe and Company performed to sold-out shows in mining towns as opposed to established cities.

After close to a decade of performing in Colorado, the Langrishes made their way to Helena, Montana, in 1870 where they built the Langrishe Opera House.

The post-Civil War years showed a marked change in theatrical tastes of the West. Dramas were forsaken for minstrel shows and burlesque. Langrishe began to lose his fortune and modified his shows to suit the tastes of his audience. The company took to the road after the Langrishe Opera House burned down in 1874.

== Deadwood ==
Langrishe arrived with his wife Jeannette and their Company in Deadwood, South Dakota, on July 15, 1876, and their first performance was held at The Bella Union. Langrishe along with treasurer and troupe manager Jonas Hellawell, leased the McDaniels Theatre July 22, 1876, from Cheyenne, Wyoming theatre manager James McDaniels, who constructed the first theatre in Deadwood.

The Langrishe Theatre's first production was "Trodden Down" on July 29, 1876. The Langrishe Theatre provided facilities for the Jack McCall murder trial, the man accused in the death of Wild Bill Hickok, the first marriage to be performed in Deadwood August 26, 1876, George Morgan to L. McKelvey by Judge Kuykendall, and as a meeting place for the fraternal order, the Independent Order of Odd Fellows. General George Crook and his officers would attend a performance at the Langrishe Theatre September 23, 1876, while visiting Deadwood.

Langrishe was an integral player in shaping Deadwood's early history as he participated in civic endeavors such as Independence Day event planning and fund raising for health charities. The Langrishe Company's benefit performance October 14, 1876, donated receipts totaling over $73 to Deadwood's hospital kitty.

Calamity Jane would appear at the Langrishe Theatre in 1876 along with noted attractions such as Jenny Lind Burlesque. Legitimate Deadwood actors and actresses, Fanny B. Price, Augusta Chambers, Belle Gilbert, Jim Gilbert, Frank Perkins, Jimmy J.M. Martin, W. J. Gross, Viola Porter, J.P. Clark and Emma Whittle performed nightly to packed houses while other forms of Deadwood entertainment and amusement drew equally large variety audiences at the Bella Union and Gem Theater where Negro Minstrels, Clog Dancers, Acrobats, Child Contortionists, Double Trapeze, Brass Bands and Serio-comic Song and Character Sketch Artists Charles Vincent and Georgie Morrell Vincent were at the top of the bill.

Langrishe leased and remodeled the Tremont House in Deadwood May 1879 and built new opera houses in the nearby mining towns of Central City and Lead, two and ten miles up Deadwood Gulch. On Langrishe Theatre opening night May 9, 1878, choice seats sold for $25 and theatre goers were tempted to sample strawberries and ice cream after the performance.

The Langrishe Theatre building would be rented to Impresario Johnny Rogers and The Metropolitan Company where legitimate theatre continued to be a successful choice of entertainment for an evolving Deadwood audience. The Old Langrishe Theatre building would continue to serve as a theatre and as a church for Congregationalist services until its final demise in the Big Deadwood Fire of September 26, 1879.

== Return to Colorado ==
Many Deadwood miners and businessmen relocated to Leadville, Colorado, in January 1879 to follow the promise of the new rush and the next big strike. Jack Langrishe and Company would once again take the stage with fellow Deadwood manager Billy Nuttall's Bella Union Theatre Company who opened the new Leadville Grand Central Theatre. Al Swearengen and the Gem Theater troupe visited Leadville February 1879, but chose to return to Deadwood. The Langrishe Troupe continued to perform to audiences in Deadwood, Central, Lead and to the soldiers at Ft. Meade through the summer of 1879. The Jack Langrishe Company's final performance to a Deadwood audience would be "Our American Cousin" August 15, 1879, performed by troupe artists The Gilberts.

Jack and Jeannette Langrishe opened November 23, 1879, at the Tabor Opera House operated by Colorado Silver Baron Horace Austin Warner Tabor and Baby Doe Tabor, Leadville, Colorado. Popular Langrishe actor Jimmy Martin would join with fellow Gem and Bella Union Theatre artists Flora Belle and Fannie Garretson to open at Leadville's McDaniels Theatre May 1880.

== Idaho and death ==
Langrishe retired from the stage in 1885 and moved to Idaho where he served as a Justice of the Peace and occasional playwright in Coeur d'Alene. In 1890 he was elected to the State Senate as a Republican in the first State Legislature of Idaho and served on committees which chose the state's flag, state seal and two senators for the US Senate. In 1892 he returned to his roots as a newsman publishing The Wardner News in Wardner, Idaho.

After a brief illness, Langrishe died in Wardner, Idaho, on December 12, 1895. His grave is located in Kellogg, Idaho.

== In popular culture ==
Langrishe was portrayed by Brian Cox in the third season of the HBO television series Deadwood.

== Bibliography ==
- Agnew, Jeremy (3 May 2011). Entertainment in the Old West: Theater, Music, Circuses, Medicine Shows, Prizefighting and Other Popular Amusements. McFarland. ISBN 978-0-7864-8645-8.
- Lauterbach, Margaret McCutcheon; Lauterbach, Charles E. (24 August 2016). Comedian of the Frontier: The Life of Actor/Manager Jack Langrishe, 1825-1895. McFarland. ISBN 978-1-4766-2495-2.
- Mitchell, Steven T. (2010). Nuggets to Neutrinos: The Homestake Story. Xlibris Corporation. ISBN 978-1-4568-3947-5.
