= Ralph Richeson =

American actor

- Born: July 6, 1952; Peru, Indiana
- Died: October 27, 2015 (aged 63); Palmdale, California
- Parent(s): Elsie Crisci Olson Richeson and Ralph Woodson Richeson, Jr.

Ralph Richeson (July 6, 1952 – October 27, 2015) was an American painter and actor best known for his role of Richardson, the fictional Grand Central Hotel's disheveled, eccentric cook on the HBO television series, Deadwood.

== Early life ==
Ralph Richeson was born on July 6, 1952, in Peru, Indiana, to Elsie Crisci Olson Richeson and Ralph Woodson Richeson Jr.

Richeson had two brothers, Robert and Harry.

== Acting career ==
Richeson was originally an extra on Deadwood, before the show's producer, David Milch, noticed him and gave him one line, which became Richeson's first onscreen credit. This led to Richeson's recurring role as the disheveled, eccentric cook in 20 of Deadwood's 36 episodes. The character was fascinated with deer antlers, which he possessed in most of his scenes on the show. Deadwood aired on HBO for three seasons, from 2004 to 2006.

Richeson was well liked on the set of Deadwood. Jim Beaver, who portrayed gold prospector Whitney Ellsworth on the show, later wrote in a 2015 Facebook post, "I don’t think there was anyone remotely involved in the show who didn’t love Ralph."

In addition to Deadwood, Richeson's film roles included a prison convict in Hancock (2008), starring Will Smith, and an "overworked homeless man" in The Revenant (2009). He was also cast as the "ghoulish man" in the Parks and Recreation episode, "The Master Plan" (2010).

== Death ==
Richeson died from heart failure on October 27, 2015, aged 63, at Palmdale Regional Medical Center in Palmdale, California. He was survived by one brother, Harry; a sister-in-law, Linda; four nieces, Tatia Richeson Hyde, Jodi Richeson, Michelle Richeson, Ashley Richeson; and a nephew, Jason Richeson. He was preceded in death by his older brother Robert Richeson and his nephew Robert Richeson II.

== Filmography ==
Year	Title	Role	Notes
2008	Hancock	Convict No. 2	
2008	No Man's Land: The Rise of Reeker	Local	
2009	The Revenant	Overworked Homeless Man	
