= Martha Bullock =

American pioneer (1849–1939)

Martha Marguerite Bullock (née Eccles; September 17, 1849 - March 10, 1939) was an American pioneer in Deadwood, South Dakota. The character Martha Bullock in the HBO series Deadwood is loosely based on her.

== Early life ==
Bullock was born on September 17, 1849, in Pennsylvania to James C Eccles and Margaret Claffey. Her parents moved from Pennsylvania to Ohio and then settled down in Battle Creek, Michigan Martha grew up in Battle Creek and later taught there as a teacher. Bullock met her husband Seth Bullock in Battle Creek. The two were childhood sweethearts and married in 1874, in Salt Lake City, Utah.

Once married the Bullocks started their life in Helena, Montana. This was where Bullock gave birth to their daughter Margaret "Madge" Bullock in 1875. In 1876 Bullock and Madge went to live with her parents while Seth began setting down roots in Deadwood, South Dakota. Bullock and Madge stayed behind because there was a lack of order in the town due to the Black Hills gold rush. Once Seth was established as the sheriff of Deadwood and had seen a decrease in crime he sent for Bullock and Madge to join him.

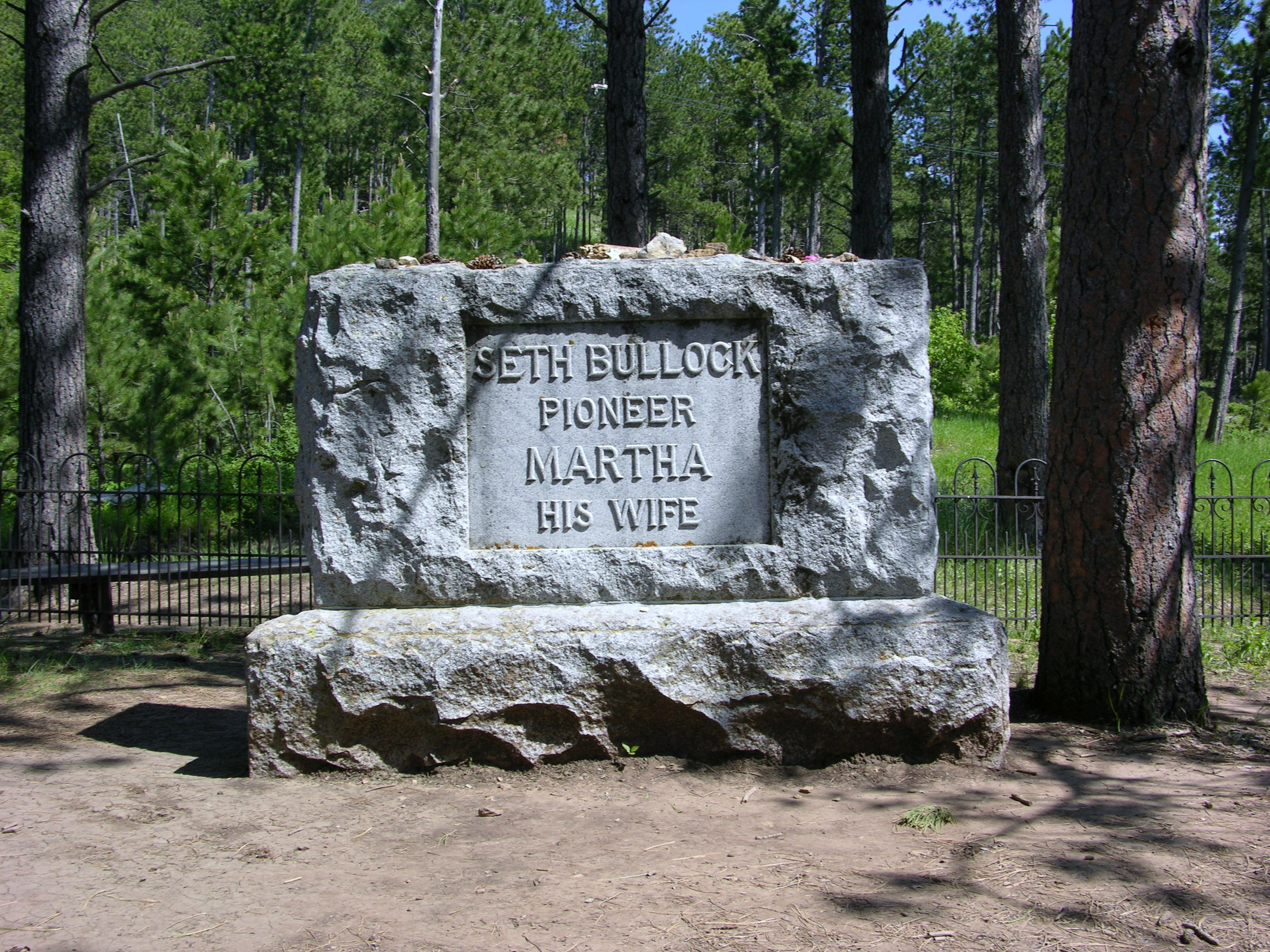
The headstone of Seth and Martha Bullock

Bullock managed their household and became a leading member of local society. She and Seth had two more children Florence, born in 1877, and a son, Stanley, born in 1880. Bullock died March 10th, 1939 at the age of 89.

== Community involvement ==
Bullock was involved in her community by helping with events, church services, singing in the choir, and was involved with local clubs. Some of these clubs included the Round Table Club, the Culture Club, and the Woman’s Suffrage League.

== In popular culture ==
Martha Bullock appeared as a supporting character in the HBO television series Deadwood and Deadwood: The Movie, where she was portrayed by Anna Gunn. Several creative liberties were taken with the facts surrounding the real Martha Bullock for the show's character. Unlike her character in the TV series, she was not originally the widow of Bullock's brother, but is reported to have been his childhood sweetheart; and similarly, rather than having a son by Bullock's brother, she and Bullock actually had a daughter, Margaret, at the time of Bullock's departure for Deadwood.
