= Samuel Fields =

American fortune seeker

- Military career
- Allegiance: United States; Union
- Branch: Union Army
- Conflicts: American Civil War

Samuel Fields was a figure of the American Wild West and an active participant in the African-American community of Deadwood, South Dakota.

Fields moved to Deadwood around 1876 to seek his fortune. He claimed to have been a General in the Union Army during the American Civil War; however, this was false.

== Career ==
Fields went by several nicknames—including "Ⲛigger General" and "General Darkey"—but was commonly known as "General Fields". The man embraced any racial epithets and regardless of his personal wealth at any moment, referred to himself as a "sly-coon".

In Deadwood, African Americans were a smaller minority than the Chinese, and Fields was quick to speak out at the many "Colored Citizens Meetings," as well as city political gatherings. An eloquent speaker, he soon earned yet another nickname – the "Shakespearian Darkey."

So "entertaining" was Fields, that the local papers often took his words out of context to provide even better stories for their readers. Such was the case when Fields correctly identified a tornado that touched down in Deadwood Gulch as a cyclone in June, 1881. Reporting on his statement, the Deadwood Times snidely referred to it as a "Sly-Coon," which added that nickname to Samuel's already growing list of monikers. While sometimes the newspapers reported legitimate news about Fields, it was often such trivial events such as "The Shakespearian Darkey attacked by snow balls" and "Wonder what bar the darkey cleaned up this morning?"

The quick talking man seemed to be everywhere in Deadwood and in April, 1878 he was arrested as a murder accomplice when Bill Gay shot and killed a man named Lloyd Forbes who was having an affair with his wife. According to the tale, Fields had carried a note between the lovers, when Bill Gay intercepted it. Gay, who was a leading citizen in Deadwood and after whom the adjacent camp of Gayville was named, defended himself on the basis that the killing was an accident. Gay argued that he only meant to pistol whip Forbes and the gun had gone off by accident.

Fields was arrested on the same day as Gay and was kept in the jail for several weeks, mostly for his own protection. Though Fields soon went free, Bill Gay was found guilty of second degree murder and sent to prison. Though Fields had been vindicated, there were many of those in camp who believed that he should be made to leave.

In July, the "General" was arrested for stealing from "Lola's Place", and found himself in trouble when Deadwood's first public school teacher was murdered in her sleep in August.

Almost immediately after Minnie Callison had been found murdered, allegations began to circulate that the "General" had been seen outside her room that same night, and Officer Siver found footprints in her yard that were the same size as Fields. Minnie's husband, John Callison, was convinced that Fields was her murderer. On August 20, 1878, Samuel was arrested, though he was later released.

In December, 1878, the papers reported that Fields had prevented a woman named Annie Simms from committing suicide.

In 1879, Fields' name was submitted for the position of Justice in Deadwood and by November he was once again practicing his "Shakespearian" oratory skills on soap boxes. But the camp hadn't forgotten his past criminal allegations and he was egged by the audience. Though he didn't win the election, it didn't completely curb his political ambitions: in 1883, he temporarily filled the town coroner position.

During Fields' time in Deadwood, he was known to have worked at the Merchants, Wentworth, and International Hotels as a porter and as a waiter. By 1889, he had moved on to Omaha, Nebraska, but a year later, he was again back in South Dakota, working as a bellhop in Rapid City.

== In popular culture ==
Fields was portrayed by Franklyn Ajaye in the HBO series Deadwood and in 2019's Deadwood: The Movie.
