= Al Swearengen =

American pimp and entrepreneur

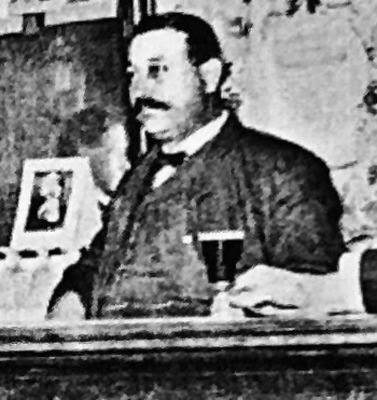
- Born: Ellis Alfred Swearengen; July 8, 1845; Oskaloosa, Iowa Territory, U.S.
- Died: November 15, 1904 (aged 59); Denver, Colorado, U.S.
- Occupations: Pimp, early entertainment entrepreneur
- Spouse(s): Nettie Swearengen (divorced); Two other marriages also ended in divorce

Ellis Alfred Swearengen (July 8, 1845 – November 15, 1904) was an American pimp and entertainment entrepreneur who ran the Gem Theater, a notorious brothel, in Deadwood, South Dakota, for 22 years during the late 19th century.

== Personal life ==
Swearengen (sometimes spelled Swearingen, Swearengin, Swearngir, etc.) and his twin brother Lemuel were the eldest two of eight children of Dutch American farmer Daniel J. Swearingen and Keziah "Katie" Montgomery of Oskaloosa, Iowa. Swearengen remained at home well into his adult years and only arrived in Deadwood in May 1876, with his wife, Nettie Swearengen. Nettie later divorced him on the grounds of spousal abuse. Swearengen married two more times; both of these marriages ended in divorce.

== Custer ==
Prior to opening a business in Deadwood, Swearengen operated a dance house in Custer, South Dakota. As stated in the 1882 New Year Edition of the Black Hills Pioneer, which described the early history of Custer, "Al Swearengen was running a dance house of 30X150 feet in dimensions and day and night a man had to push and crowd to get into it."

As to his reason for leaving, this same publication stated that "[i]n January, 1876 reports came to Custer that there was gold in Deadwood gulch. In March, the rush from Custer to Deadwood began; the roads were lined with people, and not more than one hundred persons were left in Custer; and town lots that had been selling for $800 two months before would not bring $50."

== Deadwood ==
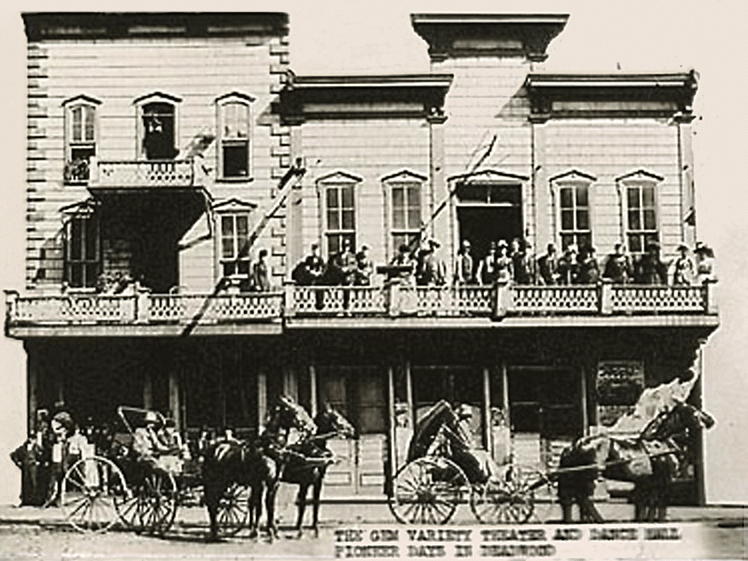
The Gem Theater circa 1878. The man in the buggy on the left is thought to be Swearengen.

Swearengen originally owned and operated a canvas-and-lumber saloon in Deadwood known as the Cricket, which featured gambling and hosted prizefights. Shortly afterward, he closed it down and opened a larger saloon known as the Gem Theater.

The Gem functioned as a saloon, dance hall, and brothel. Swearengen lured desperate young women to Deadwood, then forced them into prostitution through a combination of bullying and physical brutality committed by him and his henchmen. Calamity Jane, who was one of his first dancers at the Gem, procured ten girls from Sidney, Nebraska for him on one occasion.

The results were highly lucrative: the Gem earned a nightly average of $5,000, and sometimes as much as $10,000 (equivalent to $302,000 in 2025). The Gem burned down on September 26, 1879, along with much of the town, but Swearengen rebuilt his establishment larger and more opulent than ever, to great public acclaim.

Swearengen's talent for making canny alliances and financial payoffs kept him insulated from the general drive to clean up Deadwood, including the otherwise successful work of Seth Bullock, the town's first sheriff.

In 1899, the Gem burned down once again and was not rebuilt. The same year, Swearengen left Deadwood and married Odelia Turgeon.

== Death ==
It is often reported that Swearengen died penniless while trying to hop a freight train, but research suggests he was murdered. According to his rediscovered obituary and contemporaneous newspaper accounts, Swearengen was found dead in the middle of a suburban Denver street on November 15, 1904, apparently of a massive head wound. Less than two months earlier, his twin brother Lemuel had been shot by unknown assailants and survived, although suspiciously was not robbed.

== In popular culture ==
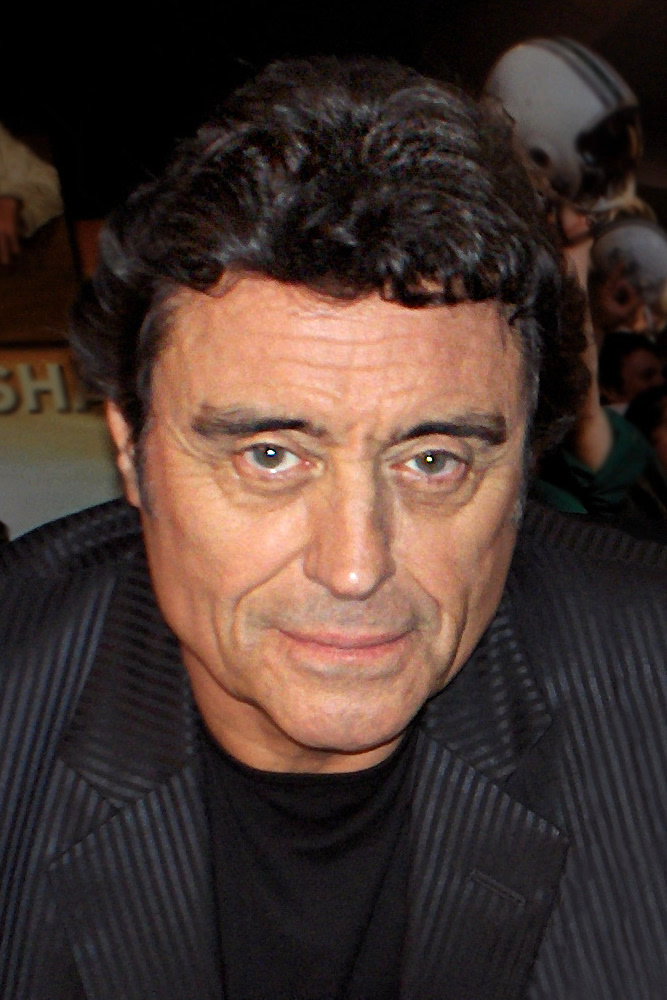
Ian McShane portrayed Swearengen in the TV series, Deadwood

From 2004 to 2006, the television series Deadwood depicted Swearengen as a powerful and influential figure in the early history of the town, ruthlessly murderous and abusive, but ultimately guiding it toward its development and annexation to the Dakota Territory once he comes to see this course as fitting his best interests. The series altered Swearengen to be English born, and also changed his first name to Albert. The English actor Ian McShane won a Golden Globe Award for Best Actor in a Television Drama in 2005 for his portrayal of Swearengen. He was also nominated that year for Emmy and Screen Actors Guild Awards, and TV Guide named him #6 in its 2013 list of The 60 Nastiest Villains of All Time. The series also altered timelines; it shows the Gem (historically opened in April 1877) as a going concern during the famous events of August 1876.

McShane reprised his role of Swearengen in Deadwood: The Movie (2019), which takes place in 1889, 13 years after the series ended.

== See also ==
- List of unsolved murders (1900–1979)
