= Tutt–Everett War =

Politically motivated feud

- Date: 1844–1850
- Location: Marion County, Arkansas, United States
- Also known as: Marion County War; Tutt, King, Everett War

The Tutt–Everett War, also called the Marion County War, or the Tutt, King, Everett War, was a politically motivated feud that took place in Marion County, Arkansas between 1844 and 1850 during the politically charged era preceding the American Civil War.

== Background ==
The feud involved the Tutt family, supporters of the Whig Party, and the Everett family, adherents of the Democratic Party. The Everetts had moved to Arkansas from Kentucky, with John "Sim", Jesse and Bart Everett becoming some of the most influential men in the area. The Tutt family, from Tennessee, was led by Hansford "Hamp" Tutt. They were influential in Searcy County, Arkansas, and were bitterly opposed to dividing Marion and Searcy counties. A third family, the Kings, also became involved, supporting the Tutts as Whig Party backers.

Violence first occurred during a political debate in Yellville, Arkansas, which degenerated into an all out brawl. The fighting peaked when Tutt supporter Alfred Burnes struck John Everett on the head with the blade of a hoe. Many fled, thinking Everett had been killed. However, he survived, despite receiving a severe gash in his head. Over the following four years, heated arguments between the factions would often lead to fist fights and brawls.

== Violence increases, 1848–50 ==
On October 9, 1848, the first gunfight took place. It happened in downtown Yellville and left John Everett dead. Two days later, the Everetts retaliated, shooting dead "Old" William King and his son Lumis. Billy King (William's son) and a friend called "Cherokee Bob", escaped with non-fatal wounds. Thereafter the rival factions engaged in gunfights almost every month, sometimes resulting in injuries but with no recorded deaths. That year, Ewell Everett was elected judge, and Tutt supporter George Adams became constable, which heightened tensions. Jesse Everett and Everett supporter Jacob Stratton and moved to Texas by the end of the year.

On July 4, 1849, Marion County Sheriff Jesse Mooney, who had a gained a tough reputation by killing or capturing several local outlaws, organized a posse to stop the feud. The same day, the biggest gunfight of the feud took place. The Everetts had gathered in Yellville in a building across the street from the saloon where the Tutt faction was known to be meeting.

Sheriff Mooney interceded and attempted to prevent violence. However, both sides ignored him and a gunfight broke out, with Sheriff Mooney and his posse caught in middle. The gunfight continued for hours. When their ammunition was finally exhausted, the Tutt and Everett men rushed into the street and continued the fight hand to hand with knives and clubs.

When it was over, Jack King, Bart Everett, Davis Tutt, Ben Tutt, and Lunsford Tutt all lay dead. John "Uncle Jacky" Hurst had been shot in the leg while jumping in front of Sheriff Mooney when Tutt supporter S.W. Ferrall fired at him. Others had been wounded. Dave Sinclair, the man suspected of killing John Everett, fled from Yellville. The Everett faction members trailed him and killed him the next day.

Jesse Everett, learning of his brother Bart's death, returned to Arkansas for revenge. Sheriff Mooney sent his son to Little Rock with an appeal for help from Governor Thomas Drew. Thomas Mooney saw the governor, but he disappeared on his return trip home. Although his horse was found, his body was never recovered, nor were killers ever identified.

Governor Drew ordered the militia to organize in neighboring Carroll County, Arkansas. The militiamen relieved Sheriff Mooney and took control of Yellville. Mooney has often been criticized for not stopping the violence, but there is little he could have done by himself. It was even hard to find deputies, since so many men in the county were aligned with one or the other of the factions.

The Carroll County militia arrested several members of the Everett faction, but when the militiamen went home six weeks later, the Everetts broke into the jail and freed their friends.

Hansford "Hamp" Tutt was shot and murdered along the banks of Crooked Creek by a mysterious stranger named the "Dutchman" from Texas who was hired by Everett. Afterwards, "The Dutchman" was never seen or heard from again. Everett and another follower fled to Shreveport, La. Everett died soon after in a cholera epidemic. With Tutt and Everett now dead, the feud effectively ended.

Except for the Flynn–Doran Feud of the 1880s, in Hot Springs, Arkansas, which preceded the Hot Springs Gunfight of 1899, this is the best known feud in Arkansas. Davis Tutt, who was a child at the time and whose father played a major part in the feud, moved west following his service in the Confederate Army. He was killed by Wild Bill Hickok on July 21, 1865 in one of the more famous Old West gunfights.
