= Waldo E. Koop =

American writer and historian

- Born: March 23, 1920; Kansas
- Died: April 23, 1990 (aged 70); Kansas
- Occupations: Engineer; Historian; Author; Researcher
- Years active: 1960–1990

Waldo E. Koop (1920–1990) was a writer on the history of the American West, a researcher, and author of publications about Billy the Kid and "Rowdy Joe" Lowe.

== Family ==
Waldo E. Koop was the son of John K. Koop and Katie Schmidt of Harvey County, Kansas. His father was a store keeper for a railroad, and his mother operated a laundry at home. He married Bette J. Young.

== Career ==
As a career, Waldo E. Koop was an engineer for Boeing. He was called one of the nation's finest researchers by local and state historians, and was credited in the series of Time Life books on the Old West for his research on gunfighters. Koop discovered that Henry McCarty, later known as Billy the Kid, spent time in Wichita, Kansas, where he saw his first gunfight. He published his findings in 1965 in the book, Billy the Kid: the Trail of a Kansas Legend.

== Publications ==
- Billy the Kid, The Trail of a Kansas Legend (Trail Guide), by Waldo E. Koop, 1965
- Rowdy Joe Lowe: Gambler With a Gun, by Joseph G. Rosa and Waldo E. Koop, Oct. 1989
- Book Review: ENCYCLOPEDIA OF WESTERN GUNFIGHTERS, The Journal of Arizona History, Vol. 20, No. 4, by Waldo E. Koop, 1979
- Waldo Koop Research Collection, by Waldo E. Koop, 1965-1990
