= Hickok–Tutt shootout =

1865 gunfight between Wild Bill Hickok and Davis Tutt

Wild Bill Hickok – Davis Tutt shootout
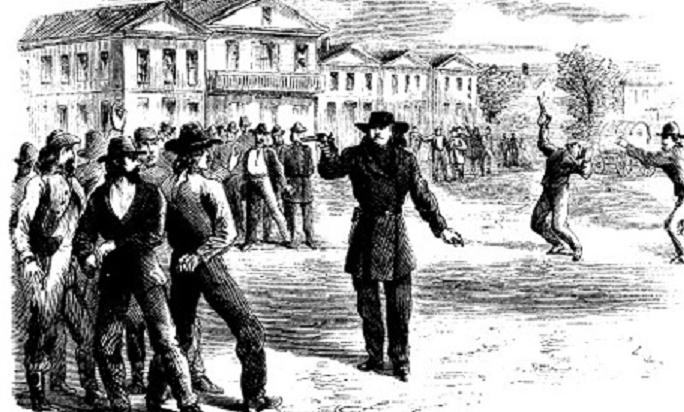
- Wild Bill Hickok threatens the friends of Davis Tutt after defeating Tutt in a duel. Harper's New Monthly Magazine, February 1867
- Date: July 21, 1865
- Location: Springfield, Missouri, United States
- Participants: Wild Bill Hickok; Davis Tutt
- Deaths: 1

The Hickok–Tutt shootout was a gunfight that occurred on July 21, 1865, in the town square of Springfield, Missouri between Wild Bill Hickok and gambler Davis Tutt. It is one of the few recorded instances in the Old West of a one-on-one pistol quick-draw duel in a public place, in the manner later made iconic by countless dime novels, radio dramas, and Western films such as High Noon. The first story of the shootout was detailed in an article in Harper's Magazine in 1867, making Hickok a household name and folk hero.

== Prelude ==
Tutt and Hickok, both gamblers, had at one point been friends, despite the fact that Tutt was a Confederate Army veteran, and Hickok had been a scout for the Union Army. Davis Tutt originally came from Marion County, Arkansas, where his family had been involved in the Tutt–Everett War, during which several of his family members had been killed. He had come north to Missouri following the Civil War. Hickok had been born in Illinois, coming west after mistakenly thinking he had killed a man in a drunken brawl.

The eventual falling out between Hickok and Tutt reportedly occurred over women. There were reports that Hickok had fathered an illegitimate child with Tutt's sister, while Tutt had been observed paying a great deal of attention to Wild Bill's paramour, Susanna Moore. When Hickok started to refuse to play with Tutt in any card game he was included in, Tutt retaliated by openly supporting other local card-players with advice and money in a dedicated attempt to bankrupt Hickok.

== The card game ==
The simmering conflict eventually came to a head during a game of poker at the Lyon House Hotel. Hickok was playing against several other local gamblers while Tutt stood nearby, loaning money as needed and "encouraging [them], coaching [them] on how to beat Hickok". The game was being played for high stakes, and Hickok had done well, winning about $200 ($4,207 as of 2025) of what was essentially Tutt's money. Irritated by his losses and unwilling to admit defeat, Tutt reminded Hickok of a $40 debt from a past horse trade. Hickok shrugged and paid the sum, but Tutt was unappeased. He then claimed that Hickok owed him an additional $35 from a past poker game. "I think you are wrong, Dave," said Hickok. "It's only twenty-five dollars. I have a memorandum in my pocket."

Tutt had a large following at the Lyon House and, encouraged by these armed associates, he decided to take the opportunity to humiliate his enemy. In the midst of their argument over the $10 difference in the debt (and while Hickok was still playing poker), Tutt grabbed one of Hickok's most prized possessions off the table, his Waltham repeater gold pocket watch, and announced that he would keep the watch as collateral until Hickok paid the full $35. Hickok was shocked and livid but, being outnumbered and outgunned, he was unwilling to resort to violence at the time. He quietly demanded that Tutt put the watch back on the table. Tutt reportedly replied only with an "ugly grin" and left the premises with the watch.

Aside from publicly humiliating Hickok and taking his property, Tutt's demand for collateral on a debt from a fellow professional card player implied he thought Hickok was an insolvent gambler trying to avoid his debts. To ignore such an insult from Tutt would have ruined Hickok's career as a gambler in Springfield, which was reportedly his only source of income. Further, groups of Tutt's friends reportedly continued to mock Hickok after the initial confrontation, baiting him with talk of the pocket watch to see if he could be goaded into drawing in anger so he could be shot down by the whole group. After several days of this, Hickok's patience was at its breaking point. When a group of Tutt's supporters at the Lyon House mocked Hickok and announced that they had heard Tutt was planning to wear the watch "in the middle of the town square" the next day, Hickok reportedly replied, "He shouldn't come across that square unless dead men can walk." Having apparently made up his mind, Hickok returned to his room to clean, oil and reload his pistols in anticipation of a confrontation with Tutt the next morning.

== Failed negotiations ==
Although Tutt had humiliated his rival, Hickok's ultimatum essentially forced his hand. To go back on his very public boast would make everyone think he was afraid of Hickok, and so long as he intended to stay in Springfield, he could not afford to show cowardice. The next day, he arrived at the town square around 10:00 a.m. with Hickok's watch openly hanging from his waist pocket. The word quickly spread that Tutt was making good on his pledge to humiliate Hickok, reaching Hickok's own ears within an hour.

According to the testimony of Eli Armstrong (and supported by two other witnesses, John Orr and Oliver Scott), Hickok met Tutt at the square and discussed the terms of the watch's return. Tutt now demanded $45. Armstrong tried to convince Tutt to accept the original $35 and negotiate for the rest later, but Hickok was still adamant that he owed only $25. Tutt then held the watch in front of Hickok and stated he would accept no less than $45. Both then said they did not want to fight and went for a drink together. Tutt soon left, however, returning once again to the square, still wearing the watch.

== The shootout ==
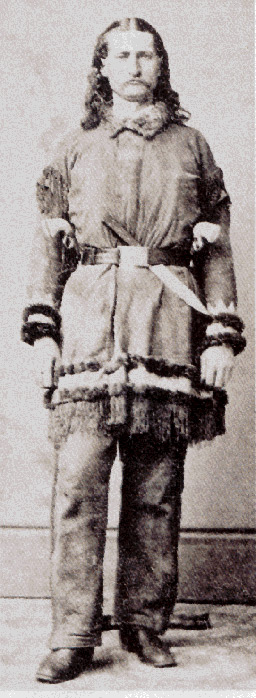
Wild Bill Hickok in 1869

At a few minutes before 6:00 p.m., Hickok was seen calmly approaching the square from the south, his Colt Navy in hand. His armed presence caused the crowd to immediately scatter to the safety of nearby buildings, leaving Tutt alone in the northwestern corner of the square. At a distance of about 75 yards, Hickok stopped, facing Tutt, and called out, "Dave, here I am." He cocked his pistol, holstered it on his hip, and gave a final warning, "Don't you come across here with that watch." Tutt did not reply, but stood with his hand on his pistol.

Both men faced each other sideways in the dueling position and hesitated briefly. Then Tutt reached for his pistol. Hickok drew his gun and steadied it on his opposite forearm. The two men fired a single shot each at essentially the same time, according to the reports. Tutt missed, but Hickok's bullet struck Tutt in the left side between the fifth and seventh ribs. Tutt called out, "Boys, I'm killed," ran onto the porch of the local courthouse and back to the street, where he collapsed and died.

== Trial and aftermath ==
The next day, a warrant was issued for Hickok's arrest and two days later he was arrested. Bail was initially denied, as is common in murder cases. Hickok eventually posted a bail of $2,000 (equivalent to $42,100 in present-day terms) on the same day, after the magistrate reduced the charge from murder to manslaughter based on the circumstances. Hickok was arrested under the name of William Haycocke (the name he had been using in Springfield) for the manslaughter of David Tutt. During the trial, the names were amended to J. B. Hickok and Davis Tutt/Little Dave, "little" being an equivalent to the present day "junior" to indicate having the same name as the father.

Hickok's manslaughter trial began on August 3, 1865, and lasted three days. Twenty-two witnesses from the square testified at the trial. Hickok's lawyer was Colonel John S. Phelps, former Union military Governor of Arkansas. The prosecution was led by Major Robert W. Fyan; the judge was Sempronius H. Boyd. The trial transcripts have been lost, but newspaper reports indicate that Hickok claimed self-defense. The most disputed fact at the trial was who fired first. Only four witnesses actually watched the fight. Two claimed both men fired, but they could not tell who drew first. One said he was standing behind Hickok so he saw only Hickok draw, as his view of Tutt was blocked. Another said Tutt did not fire, but admitted noticing Tutt's gun had a discharged chamber. The other witnesses all stated that while they did not see the shooting, they heard only one shot.

Despite Hickok's claim of self-defense being technically invalid under the state law pertaining to "mutual combat" (since he had come to the square armed and expecting to fight), the jury decided that he was justified in shooting Tutt. As Tutt was the initiator of the fight (by taking Hickok's watch) and the first to display overt aggression, and since two witnesses indicated that Tutt was the first to reach for his pistol, the unwritten law dictated that Hickok was justified and subsequently they absolved him of guilt. In fact, Hickok was seen as being honorable for giving Tutt several chances to avoid the conflict instead of shooting him the moment he felt he was shown disrespect.

Judge Boyd gave the jury two apparently contradictory instructions. He first instructed the jury that a conviction was its only option under the law. (Note: "The defendant cannot set up justification that he acted in self-defense if he was willing to engage in a fight with deceased. To be entitled to acquittal on the ground of self-defense, he must have been anxious to avoid a conflict, and must have used all reasonable means to avoid it. If the deceased and defendant engaged in a fight or conflict willingly on the part of each, and the defendant killed the deceased, he is guilty of the offense charged, although the deceased may have fired the first shot.") However, he then instructed them that they could apply the unwritten law of the "fair fight" and acquit, (Note: "That when danger is threatened and impending a man is not compelled to stand with his arms folded until it is too late to offer successful resistance & if the jury believe from the evidence that Tutt was a fighting character & a dangerous man & that Deft. was aware such was his character & that Tutt at the time he was shot by the Deft was advancing on him with a drawn pistol & that Tutt had previously made threats of personal injury to Deft ... & that Deft shot Tutt to prevent the threatened impending injury [then] the jury will acquit") an action known as jury nullification, which allows a jury to make a finding contrary to the law. The trial ended in acquittal on August 6, 1865, after the jury deliberated for "an hour or two" before reaching a verdict of not guilty, which was not popular at the time. A prominent Springfield attorney gave a speech to the crowd from the balcony of the court house, denouncing the verdict as "against the evidence and all decency" and there was talk of lynching Hickok.

The verdict was expected and well in keeping with the "trail law" of the day; as stated by a modern historian, "Nothing better described the times than the fact that dangling a watch held as security for a poker debt was widely regarded as a justifiable provocation for resorting to firearms." While Hickok felt humiliated by Tutt wearing the watch, Tutt could also claim the same humiliation if he failed to wear the watch, essentially bowing to Hickok's warning. Due to its notoriety, the gunfight has since received much research and attention. Several weeks after the gunfight, on September 13, 1865, Colonel George Ward Nichols, a writer for Harper's, sought out Hickok and began the interviews that would eventually turn the then-unknown gunfighter into one of the great legends of the Old West.

Davis Tutt's body was initially buried in the Springfield City Cemetery, but was disinterred and reburied in Maple Park Cemetery in March 1883 by his half-brother Lewis Tutt, a former slave who was the son of Tutt's father and his female slave.
