= Wild Bill Hickok =

American soldier, gunman, gambler, and actor (1837–1876)

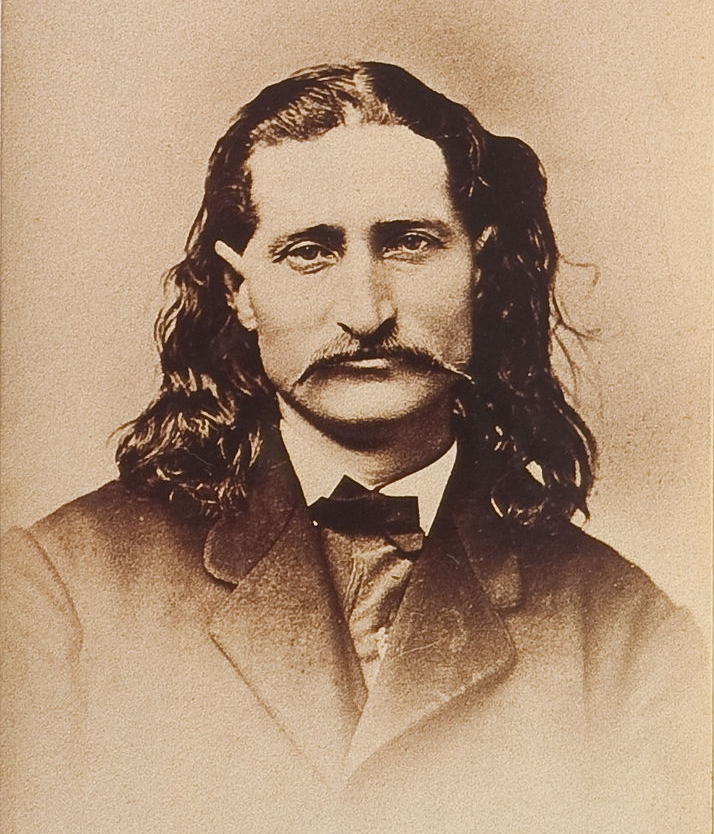
- Born: James Butler Hickok; May 27, 1837; Homer, Illinois, U.S. (now Troy Grove, Illinois, U.S.)
- Died: August 2, 1876 (aged 39); Deadwood, Dakota Territory, U.S.
- Cause of death: Gunshot wound
- Resting place: Mount Moriah Cemetery, Deadwood, Dakota Territory
- Other names: James B. Hickok, J. B. Hickok, William Hickok, William Haycock
- Occupations: Farmer; drover; lawman; soldier; scout; actor
- Years active: 1855−1876
- Spouse: Agnes Thatcher Lake (m. 1876)
- Parent(s): William Alonzo Hickok and Polly Butler
- Relatives: Oliver Cromwell Hickok (1830–1898, brother)

James Butler Hickok (May 27, 1837 – August 2, 1876), better known as "Wild Bill" Hickok, was a folk hero of the American Old West known for his life on the frontier as a soldier, scout, lawman, cattle rustler, gunslinger, gambler, showman, and actor, and for his involvement in many famous gunfights. He earned a great deal of fame in his own time, much of it bolstered by the many outlandish and often fabricated tales told and printed about him, occasionally by himself. Some contemporaneous reports of his exploits are known to be fictitious, but they remain the basis of much of his fame and reputation.

Hickok was born and raised on a farm in Northern Illinois at a time when lawlessness and vigilante activity were rampant because of the influence of the "Banditti of the Prairie". Drawn to this criminal lifestyle, he headed west at age 18 as a fugitive from justice, working as a stagecoach driver and later as a lawman in the frontier territories of Kansas and Nebraska. He served in and spied for the Union army during the American Civil War and gained publicity after the war as a scout, marksman, actor, and professional gambler. He was involved in several notable shootouts during the course of his life.

In 1876, Hickok was shot and killed while playing poker in a saloon in Deadwood, Dakota Territory (present-day South Dakota) by Jack McCall, an unsuccessful gambler. The hand of cards that he supposedly held at the time of his death has become known as the dead man's hand: two pairs, black aces and eights, and another unknown card, therefore having five cards in his hand at his death.

Hickok remains a popular figure of frontier history. Many historic sites and monuments commemorate his life, and he has been depicted numerous times in literature, film, and television. He is chiefly portrayed as a protagonist, although historical accounts of his actions are often controversial, and much of his career is known to have been exaggerated both by himself and by contemporary mythmakers. Hickok claimed to have shot numerous gunmen in his lifetime, and he killed six or seven, all between 1861 and 1871 according to Joseph G. Rosa, Hickok's biographer and the foremost authority on him.

== Early life ==
James Butler Hickok was born May 27, 1837, in Homer, Illinois, (present-day Troy Grove, Illinois) to William Alonzo Hickok (1801–1852), a farmer and abolitionist, and his wife, Pamelia Hickok (née Butler, 1804–1878). Hickok was of English ancestry. James was the fourth of six children. His father was said to have used the family house, now demolished, as a station on the Underground Railroad. William Hickok died in 1852, when James was 15.

Hickok was a good shot from a young age, and was recognized locally as an outstanding marksman with a pistol. Photographs of Hickok appear to depict dark hair, but all contemporaneous descriptions affirm that he had red hair. (Note: Red objects generally appear black in early photographs, as the photographic processes were insensitive to red light.)

In 1855, at age 18, James Hickok fled Illinois following a fight with Charles Hudson, during which both fell into a canal; each thought, mistakenly, that he had killed the other. Hickok moved to Leavenworth in the Kansas Territory, where he joined Jim Lane's Free State Army (also known as the Jayhawkers), an antislavery vigilante group active in the new territory during the Bleeding Kansas era. While there he met 12-year-old William Cody (later known as "Buffalo Bill"), who, despite his youth, served as a scout just two years later for the U.S. Army during the Utah War.

=== Nicknames ===
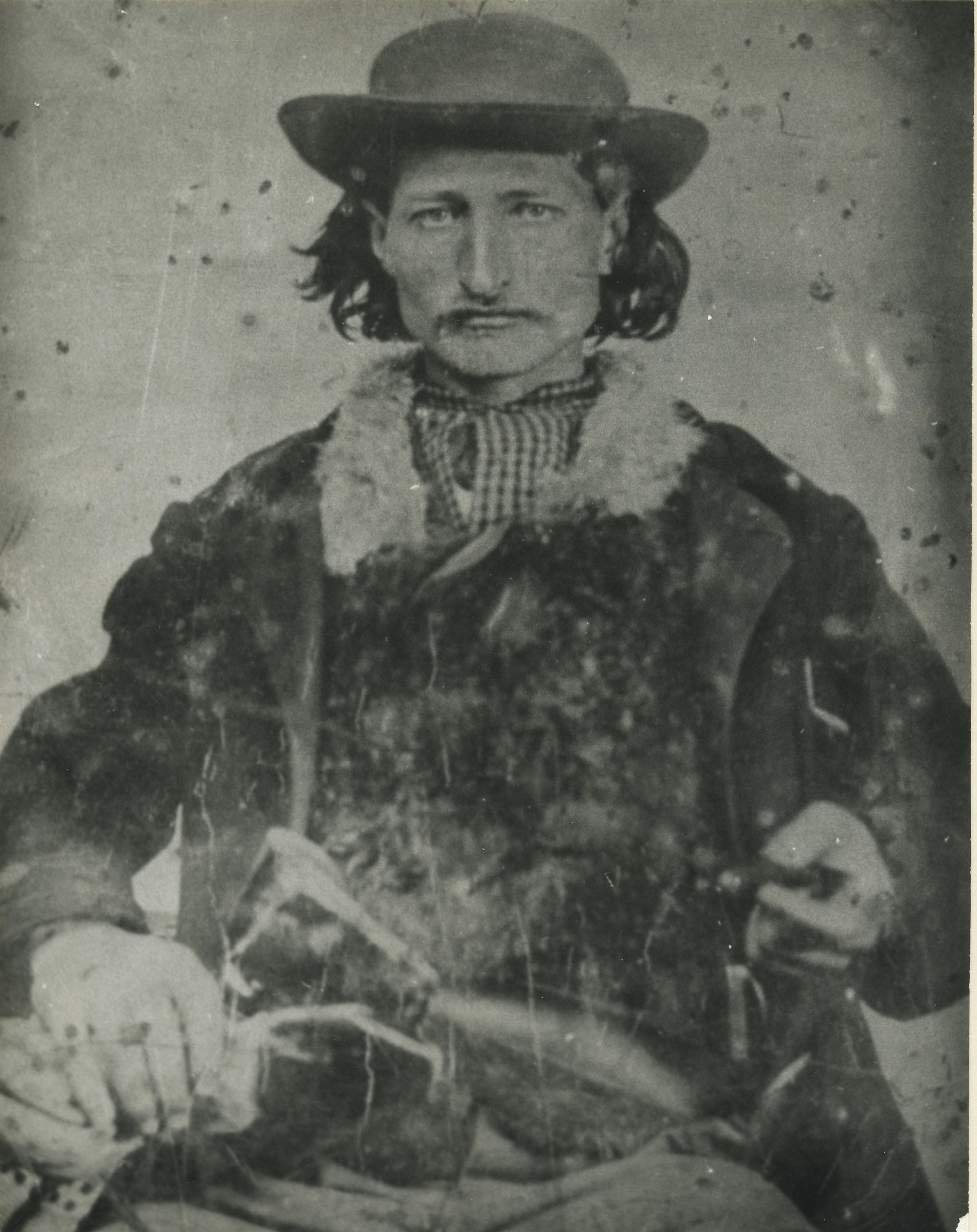
James B. Hickok in the 1860s, during his pre-gunfighter days

Hickok used his late father's name, William Hickok, from 1858, and the name William Haycock during the American Civil War. Most newspapers referred to him as William Haycock until 1869. He was arrested while using the name Haycock in 1865. He afterward resumed using his given name, James Hickok. Military records after 1865 list him as Hickok, but he was also known as Haycock. In an 1867 article about his shootout with Davis Tutt, his surname was misspelled as Hitchcock.

While in Nebraska, Hickok was derisively referred to by one man as "Duck Bill" for his long nose and protruding lips. He grew a moustache following the McCanles incident, and in 1861 began calling himself "Wild Bill".

== Early career ==
In 1857, Hickok claimed a 160-acre (65 ha) tract in Johnson County, Kansas, near present-day Lenexa. On March 22, 1858, he was elected one of the first four constables of Monticello Township. In 1859, he joined the Russell, Majors and Waddell freight company, the parent company of the Pony Express.

In 1860, Hickok was badly injured by a bear, while driving a freight team from Independence, Missouri, to Santa Fe, New Mexico. According to Hickok's account, he found the road blocked by a cinnamon bear and its two cubs. Dismounting, he approached the bear and fired a shot into its head, but the bullet ricocheted off its skull, infuriating it. The bear attacked, crushing Hickok with its body. Hickok managed to fire another shot, wounding the bear's paw. The bear then grabbed his arm in its mouth, but Hickok was able to grab his knife and slash its throat, killing it.

Hickok was severely injured, with a crushed chest, shoulder, and arm. He was bedridden for four months before being sent to Rock Creek Station in the Nebraska Territory to work as a stable hand while he recovered. There, the freight company had built a stagecoach stop along the Oregon Trail near Fairbury, Nebraska, on land purchased from David McCanles.

=== McCanles shooting ===
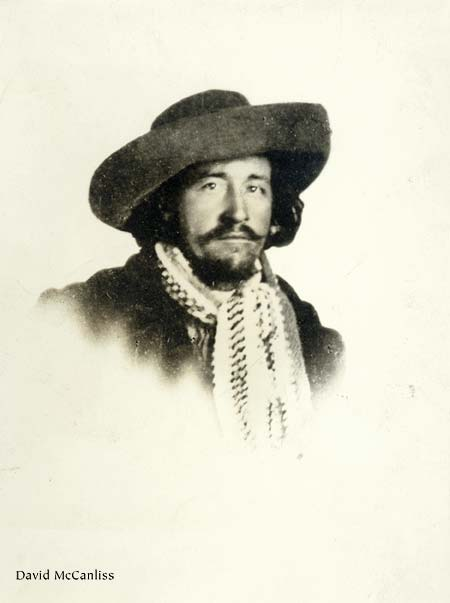
David C. McCanles, alleged leader of the McCanles Gang, in 1860

On July 12, 1861, David McCanles went to the Rock Creek Station office to demand an overdue property payment from Horace Wellman, the station manager. McCanles reportedly threatened Wellman, and either Wellman or Hickok, who was hiding behind a curtain, killed McCanles. Two men with McCanles (James Wood and James Gordon) were also killed. Hickok, Wellman, and another employee, J.W. Brink, were tried for killing McCanles, but were found to have acted in self-defense. McCanles may have been the first man Hickok killed. Hickok subsequently visited McCanles' widow, apologized for the killing, and offered her $35 [$1,254 in 2025 dollars] in restitution, all the money he had with him at the time. (Note: Personal account of the foreman of the Overland Stage Company stations, as given to The DeWitt Times News: At the time of this affair I was at a station farther west and reached this station just as Wild Bill was getting ready to go to Beatrice for his trial. He wanted me to go with him, and as we started on our way, imagine my surprise and uncomfortable feeling when he announced his intention of stopping at the McCanles home. I would have rather been somewhere else, but Bill stopped. He told Mrs. McCanles he was sorry he had to kill her man then took out $35 and gave it to her saying: "This is all I have, sorry I do not have more to give you." We drove on to Beatrice and at the trial, his plea was self-defense; no one appeared against him, and he was cleared. The trial did not last more than fifteen minutes.)

=== Civil War service ===
After the Civil War broke out in April 1861, Hickok became a teamster for the Union army in Sedalia, Missouri. By the end of 1861, he was a wagon master, but in September 1862, he was discharged for unknown reasons. He then joined Brigadier General Jim Lane's Kansas Brigade, and while serving with the brigade was reunited with his friend Buffalo Bill Cody, who was serving in it as a scout.

Buffalo Bill claimed that he encountered Hickok disguised as a Confederate States Army officer in Missouri in 1864. Hickok had not been paid for some time, and was hired as a scout by General John B. Sanborn by early 1865. In June, Hickok mustered out and went to Springfield, where he gambled. The 1883 History of Greene County, Missouri described him as "by nature a ruffian ... a drunken, swaggering fellow, who delighted when 'on a spree' to frighten nervous men and timid women."

== Lawman and scout ==
=== Duel with Davis Tutt ===
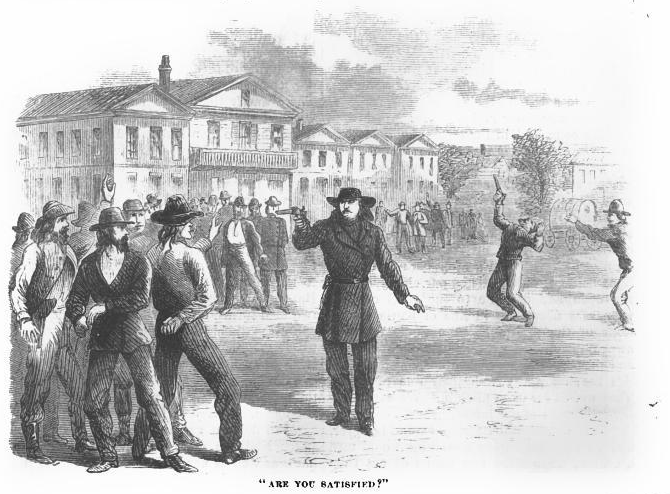
The Hickok–Tutt shootout, in an 1867 illustration accompanying the article by Nichols in Harper's magazine

While in Springfield, Hickok and a local gambler named Davis Tutt had several disagreements over unpaid gambling debts and their common affection for the same women. Hickok lost a gold watch to Tutt in a poker game. The watch had great sentimental value to Hickok, so he asked Tutt not to wear it in public. They initially agreed not to fight over the watch, but Hickok saw Tutt wearing it and warned him to stay away. On July 21, 1865, the two men faced off in Springfield's town square, standing sideways before drawing and firing their weapons. Their quick-draw duel was recorded as the first of its kind. Tutt's shot missed, but Hickok's struck Tutt through the heart from about 75 yards (69 m) away. Tutt called out, "Boys, I'm killed" before he collapsed and died.

Hickok was arrested for murder two days later, but the charge was reduced to manslaughter. He was released on $2,000 bail and stood trial on August 3, 1865. At the end of the trial, Judge Sempronius H. Boyd told the jury that they could not find that Hickok acted in self-defense if he could have reasonably avoided the fight. (Note: Judge Boyd told the jury, "The defendant cannot set up justification that he acted in self-defense if he was willing to engage in a fight with the deceased. To be entitled to acquittal on the ground of self-defense, he must have been anxious to avoid a conflict, and must have used all reasonable means to avoid it. If the deceased and defendant engaged in a fight or conflict willingly on the part of each, and the defendant killed the deceased, he is guilty of the offense charged, although the deceased may have fired the first shot.") However, if they felt that the threat of danger was real and imminent, he instructed that they could apply the unwritten law of the "fair fight" and acquit. (Note: Judge Boyd said, "That when danger is threatened and impending a man is not compelled to stand with his arms folded until it is too late to offer successful resistance, and if the jury believe from the evidence that Tutt was a fighting character and a dangerous man and that [Defendant] was aware such was his character and that Tutt at the time he was shot by the Deft. was advancing on him with a drawn pistol and that Tutt had previously made threats of personal injury to Deft.... and that Deft. shot Tutt to prevent the threatened impending injury the jury will acquit.") The jury voted to clear Hickok, resulting in public backlash and criticism of the verdict.

Several weeks later, Harper's New Monthly Magazine published an interview that Hickok gave to Colonel George Ward Nichols, a journalist who became known as the creator of the Hickok legend, under the name "Wild Bill Hitchcock". The article recounted the "hundreds" of men whom Hickok had personally killed and other exaggerated exploits. It was controversial wherever Hickok was known, and several frontier newspapers wrote rebuttals.

=== Deputy U.S. marshal in Kansas ===
In September 1865, Hickok came in second in the election for city marshal of Springfield, but he was recommended for the position of deputy federal marshal at Fort Riley, Kansas. This was during the Indian Wars, in which Hickok sometimes served as a scout for General George A. Custer's 7th Cavalry.

Henry M. Stanley of the Weekly Missouri Democrat reported Hickok to be "an inveterate hater of Indian People", perhaps to enhance his reputation as a scout and American fighter. But separating fact from fiction is difficult considering his recruitment of Indians to cross the nation to appear in his own Wild West show. Witnesses confirm that Hickok was attacked by a large group of Indians on May 11, 1867 while working as a scout at Fort Harker, Kansas. The Indians fled after he shot and killed two. In July, Hickok told a newspaper reporter that he had led several soldiers in pursuit of Indians who had killed four men near the fort on July 2. He reported returning with five prisoners after killing 10. Witnesses confirm that the story was true to the extent that the party had set out to find whoever had killed the four men, (Note: For details, see Evening Star, July 1, 1867, which contains a garbled report of 11 men killed by Indians at Fort Harker. It also reports the death of one railroad man and the wounding of a second by Indians near Fort Harker (the two casualties are confirmed). The report of the larger number of deaths may confuse this incident with another fight with Indians at Fort Wallace, Kansas, in which a number of soldiers were killed and wounded. For the Fort Wallace fight and casualties, see The Sun, July 15, 1867.) but the group returned to the fort "without nary a dead Indian" and without "even seeing a live one".

In December 1867, newspapers reported that Hickok had come to stay in Hays City, Kansas. He became a deputy U.S. marshal, and he picked up 11 Union deserters on March 28, 1868 who had been charged with stealing government property. Hickok was assigned to bring the men to Topeka for trial, and he requested a military escort from Fort Hays. He was assigned Buffalo Bill Cody, a sergeant, and five privates. They arrived in Topeka on April 2. Hickok remained in Hays through August 1868, when he brought 200 Cheyenne Indians to Hays to be viewed by "excursionists" as a tourist attraction.

On September 1, 1868, Hickok was in Lincoln County, Kansas where he was hired as a scout by the 10th Cavalry Regiment, a segregated black unit. On September 4, Hickok was wounded in the foot while rescuing several cattlemen in the Bijou Creek basin who had been surrounded by Indians. The 10th Regiment arrived at Fort Lyon in Colorado in October and remained there for the rest of 1868.

=== Marshal of Hays, Kansas ===
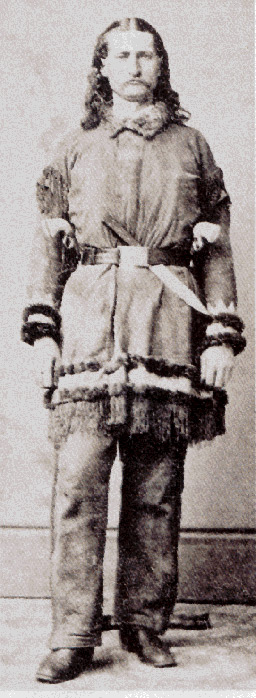
Wild Bill Hickok in 1869

In July 1869, Hickok returned to Hays and was elected city marshal of Hays and sheriff of Ellis County, Kansas, in a special election held on August 23, 1869. Three sheriffs had quit during the previous 18 months. Hickok may have been acting sheriff before he was elected; a newspaper reported that he arrested offenders on August 18, and the commander of Fort Hays wrote a letter to the assistant adjutant general on August 21 in which he praised Hickok for his work in apprehending deserters. (Note: The "special election" may not have been legal, as a letter dated September 17 to the governor of Kansas noted that Hickok had presented a warrant for an arrest which was rejected by the Fort Hays commander, because, when asked to produce his commission, Hickok admitted that he had never received one.)

The regular county election was held on November 2, 1869. Hickok ran as an Independent; but lost to his deputy, Peter Lanihan, who ran as a Democrat. Hickok and Lanihan, however, remained sheriff and deputy, respectively. Hickok accused a J.V. Macintosh of irregularities and misconduct during the election. On December 9, Hickok and Lanihan both served legal papers on Macintosh, and local newspapers acknowledged that Hickok had guardianship of Hays City.

=== Killings as sheriff ===
Hickok killed two men in September 1869 during his first month as sheriff. The first was Bill Mulvey, who was galloping through town on a rampage, drunk, shooting out mirrors and whisky bottles behind bars. Citizens warned Mulvey to behave because Hickok was sheriff, but Mulvey angrily declared that he had come to town to kill Hickok. When he saw Hickok, he leveled his cocked rifle at him. Hickok waved his hand past Mulvey at some supposed onlookers and yelled, "Don't shoot him in the back; he is drunk." Mulvey wheeled his horse around to face those who might shoot him from behind, and Hickok shot him through the temple before he realized that he had been fooled.

The second man killed by Hickok was Samuel Strawhun, a cowboy who was causing a disturbance in a saloon at 1:00 a.m. on September 27 when Hickok and Lanihan went to the scene. Strawhun "made remarks against Hickok", and Hickok killed him with a shot through the head. Hickok said that he had "tried to restore order". A jury at the coroner's inquest found the shooting justifiable, despite "very contradictory" evidence from witnesses.

On July 17, 1870, Hickok was attacked in a saloon by two troopers from the 7th U.S. Cavalry named Jeremiah Lonergan and John Kyle (sometimes spelled Kile). Lonergan pinned Hickok to the ground, and Kyle put his gun to Hickok's ear. Kyle's weapon misfired and Hickok shot Lonergan, wounding him in the knee, and then shot Kyle twice, killing him. Hickok again lost his re-election bid to his deputy.

=== Marshal of Abilene, Kansas ===
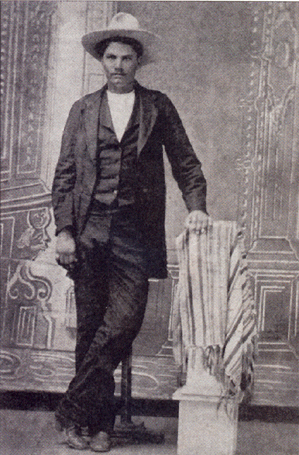
John Wesley Hardin, a well-known gunfighter, claimed to have killed at least 27 men. In his autobiography, Hardin made the unlikely claim that he had once disarmed Town Marshal "Wild Bill" Hickok with the use of the "road agent's spin" while surrendering his guns to the lawman due to a local ordinance.

On April 15, 1871, Hickok became marshal of Abilene, Kansas after being hired by mayor Joseph McCoy, who had won the mayoral election that same month. He replaced Tom "Bear River" Smith, who had been killed while serving an arrest warrant on November 2, 1870. Outlaw John Wesley Hardin arrived in Abilene at the end of a cattle drive in early 1871. Hardin was a well-known gunfighter, and is known to have killed more than 27 men. Hardin claimed in his 1895 autobiography that he was befriended by Hickok, the newly elected town marshal, after he had disarmed the marshal using the road agent's spin, but Hardin was known to exaggerate. In any case, Hardin appeared to have thought highly of Hickok.

Hickok later said that he did not know that "Wesley Clemmons" was Hardin's alias, nor that he was a wanted outlaw. He told Hardin to stay out of trouble in Abilene and asked him to hand over his guns, and Hardin complied. Hardin alleged that his cousin Mannen Clements was jailed for the killing of cowhands Joe and Dolph Shadden in July 1871, and Hickok arranged for his escape at Hardin's request.

In August 1871, Hickok sought to arrest Hardin for killing Charles Couger in an Abilene hotel "for snoring too loud", but Hardin left Kansas before Hickok could arrest him. A newspaper reported, "A man was killed in his bed at a hotel in Abilene, Monday night, by a desperado called 'Arkansas'. The murderer escaped. This was his sixth murder."

=== Shootout with Phil Coe ===
Hickok had a dispute with saloon owner Phil Coe that resulted in a shootout. Coe had established the Bull's Head Saloon in Abilene in partnership with gambler Ben Thompson. The two men had painted a picture of a bull with a large erect penis on the side of their establishment as an advertisement. Citizens of the town complained to Hickok, who requested that Thompson and Coe remove the image. They refused, so Hickok altered it himself. Infuriated, Thompson tried to incite John Wesley Hardin to kill Hickok by exclaiming to Hardin that "he's a damn Yankee. Picks on rebels, especially Texans, to kill." Hardin was in town under his assumed name Wesley Clemmons, but was better known to the townspeople by the alias "Little Arkansas". He seemed to have respect for Hickok's abilities and replied, "If Bill needs killing, why don't you kill him yourself?" Hoping to intimidate Hickok, Coe allegedly stated that he could "kill a crow on the wing".

On October 5, 1871, Hickok was standing off a crowd during a street brawl when Coe fired two shots. Hickok ordered him to be arrested for firing a pistol within the city limits. Coe claimed that he was shooting at a stray dog, (Note: At the time, shooting stray dogs within city limits was legal, and a 50-cent bounty was paid by the city for each one shot.) and then suddenly turned his gun on Hickok. Hickok fired first and killed Coe. Theophilus Little, the mayor of Abilene and owner of the town's lumber yard, recorded his time in Abilene in a notebook in 1911. He detailed his admiration for Hickok and included a paragraph on the shooting that differs considerably from the reported account:

"Phil" Coe was from Texas, ran the "Bull's Head" a saloon and gambling den, sold whiskey and men's souls. As vile a character as I ever met for some cause Wild Bill incurred Coe's hatred and he vowed to secure the death of the marshal. Not having the courage to do it himself, he one day filled about 200 cowboys with whiskey intending to get them into trouble with Wild Bill, hoping that they would get to shooting and in the melee shoot the marshal. But Coe "reckoned without his host". Wild Bill had learned of the scheme and cornered Coe, had his two pistols drawn on Coe. Just as he pulled the trigger, one of the policemen rushed around the corner between Coe and the pistols and both balls entered his body, killing him instantly. In an instant, he pulled the triggers again sending two bullets into Coe's abdomen (Coe lived a day or two) and whirling with his two guns drawn on the drunken crowd of cowboys, "and now do any of you fellows want the rest of these bullets?" Not a word was uttered.

After shooting Coe, Hickok caught a glimpse of someone running toward him and quickly fired two more shots in reaction, accidentally killing Abilene Special Deputy Marshal Mike Williams, who was coming to his aid. This was the last time that Hickok was ever involved in a gunfight; the accidental death of Deputy Williams was an event that haunted him for the remainder of his life.

Hickok was relieved of his duties as marshal less than two months after the accidental shooting, this incident being only one of a series of questionable shootings and claims of misconduct during his career.

== Later life ==
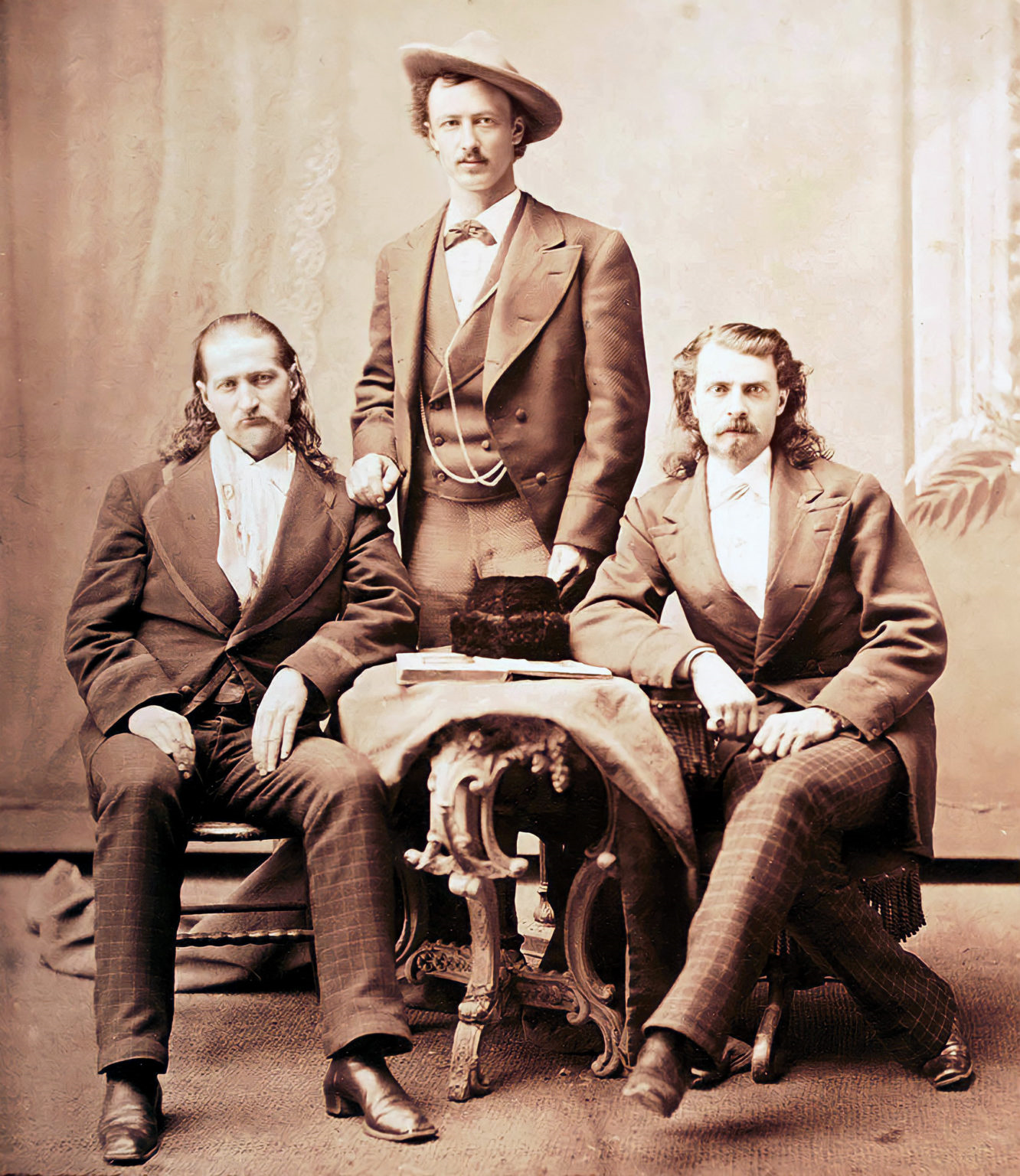
Hickok, Texas Jack Omohundro, and Buffalo Bill Cody as the "Scouts of the Plains" in 1873

In 1872, Hickok recruited six Native Americans and three cowboys to accompany him to Niagara Falls, where he put on an outdoor demonstration called The Daring Buffalo Chase of the Plains. Since the event was outdoors, he could not compel people to pay, and the venture was a financial failure. The show featured six buffalo, a bear, and a monkey, and one show ended in disaster when a buffalo refused to act, prompting Hickok to fire a bullet into the sky. This angered the buffalo and panicked audience members, causing the animals to break free of their wire fencing and chase audience members, some of whom were trampled. The incident helped contribute to the overall failure of the show.

In 1873, Buffalo Bill Cody and Texas Jack Omohundro invited Hickok to join their troupe after their earlier success. Hickok did not enjoy acting, and often hid behind scenery. In one show, he shot the spotlight when it focused on him. He was released from the group after a few months.

=== Eye trouble ===
From 1871 until his death in 1876, Hickok had vision problems. A former cavalryman, J. W. "Doc" Howard, who had known Hickok, stated that Hickok had left Buffalo Bill's Scouts of the Plains exhibition "because the lights affected his eyes, so he had to give it up".

Charles Snyder, the Lucien Howe Librarian of Ophthalmology at Harvard Medical School, said "Granular conjunctivitis, ophthalmia, trachoma—call it what you will—was common on the Western Frontier. Jesse James suffered from it."

In 1876, Hickok sought treatment from an eye specialist in Kansas City, Missouri. No definitive diagnosis has survived, but speculation ranges from secondary syphilis to glaucoma. Although he was just 39, his marksmanship and health were apparently in decline, and he had been arrested several times for vagrancy.

=== Marriage ===
Hickok met Agnes Thatcher Lake, at the time 45 years old, on July 31, 1871. Lake, a widow and the proprietor of Lake's Hippo-Olympiad circus, arrived in Abilene and went to the office of the town marshal to pay the performance fee. She and the circus departed the next day, but Lake and Hickok continued to correspond. On March 5, 1876, Hickok married Lake in Cheyenne, Wyoming Territory. Hickok left his new bride a few months later, joining Charlie Utter's wagon train to seek his fortune in the gold fields of South Dakota.

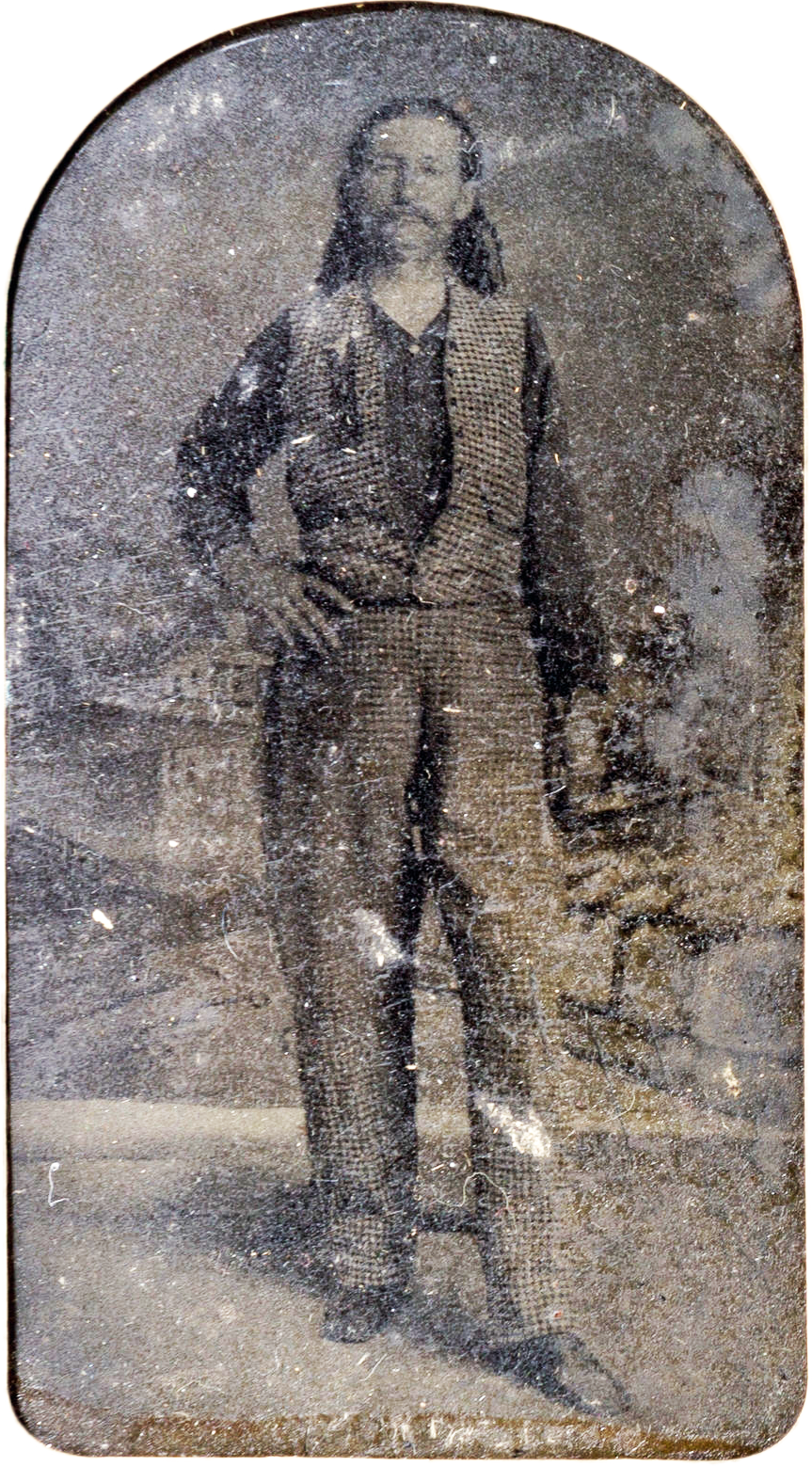
Tintype of Hickok c. 1870. It was found with the last letter he wrote to his wife, Agnes Thatcher Lake.

Shortly before his death, Hickok wrote a letter to his new wife, which read in part, "Agnes Darling, if such should be we never meet again, while firing my last shot, I will gently breathe the name of my wife—Agnes—and with wishes even for my enemies I will make the plunge and try to swim to the other shore."

Martha Jane Cannary, known popularly as Calamity Jane, claimed in her autobiography that she was married to Hickok and had divorced him so he could be free to marry Agnes Lake, but no records that support her account have been found. The two possibly met for the first time after Jane was released from the guardhouse in Fort Laramie and joined the wagon train in which Hickok was traveling. The wagon train arrived in Deadwood in July 1876.

== Death ==
On August 1, 1876, Hickok was playing poker at Nuttal & Mann's Saloon No. 10 in Deadwood, Dakota Territory. A seat opened up at the table and a drunk man named Jack McCall sat down to play. McCall lost heavily. Hickok encouraged him to quit the game until he could cover his losses, and offered to give him money for breakfast. McCall accepted the money, but he was apparently insulted.

The next day, Hickok was playing poker again. He usually sat with his back to a wall so that he could see the entrance, but the only seat available when he joined the game was a chair facing away from the door. He twice asked Charles Rich to change seats with him, but Rich refused. McCall then entered the saloon, walked up behind Hickok, drew his Colt Single Action Army .45-caliber revolver serial #2079, and shouted, "Take that!" as he shot Hickok in the back of the head at point-blank range.

Hickok died instantly. The bullet emerged through his right cheek and struck Captain William Massie in the left wrist. Hickok had told his friend Charlie Utter that he thought that he would be killed while in Deadwood.

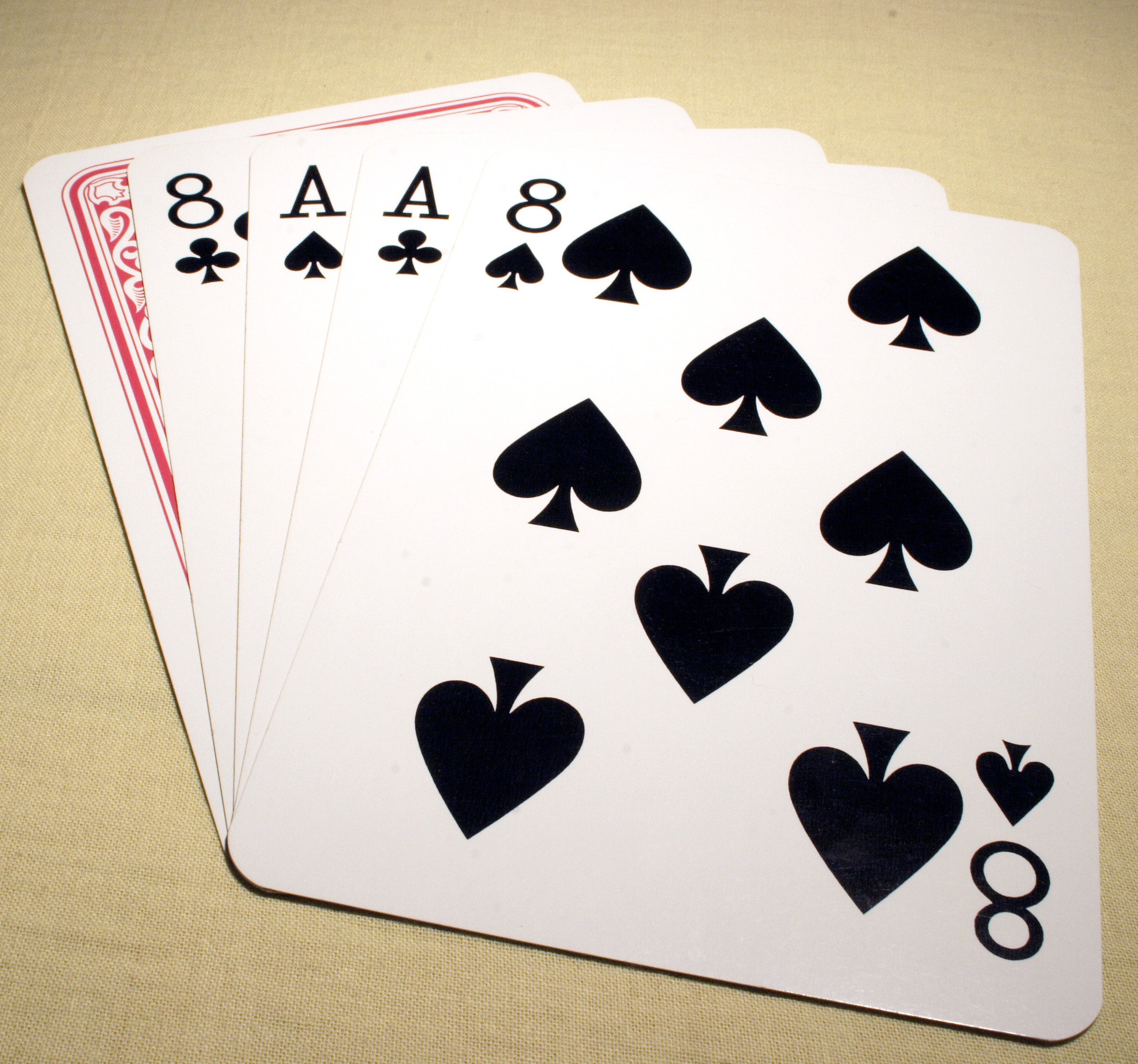
The poker hand purportedly held by Hickok at his demise

Hickok was playing five-card stud or five-card draw when he was shot. He was holding two pairs: black aces and black eights as his "up cards", which has since become widely known as the "dead man's hand". The identity of the fifth card is the subject of debate.

=== Jack McCall's two trials ===
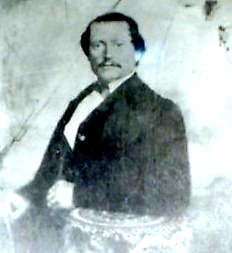
Jack McCall shot Hickok in the back of the head; the photo has been claimed to be of McCall, but is unsubstantiated.

McCall's motive for killing Hickok is the subject of speculation, largely concerning McCall's anger at Hickok's giving him money for breakfast the day McCall had lost heavily.

McCall was summoned before an informal "miners' jury", an ad hoc local group of miners and businessmen. He claimed that he was avenging Hickok's slaying of his brother, which may have been true; a man named Lew McCall had indeed been killed by an unknown lawman in Abilene, Kansas, but whether the two McCall men were related is unknown. McCall was acquitted of the murder, which prompted editorializing in the Black Hills Pioneer: "Should it ever be our misfortune to kill a man ... we would simply ask that our trial may take place in some of the mining camps of these hills." Calamity Jane is reputed to have led a mob that threatened McCall with lynching, but she was actually being held by military authorities at the time.

McCall was rearrested after bragging about Hickok's death. The second trial was not considered double jeopardy because of the irregular jury in the first trial, and because Deadwood was in unorganized Indian country at the time. The new trial was held in Yankton, the capital of the Dakota Territory. McCall was found guilty and sentenced to death.

Leander Richardson interviewed McCall shortly before his execution and wrote an article about him for the April 1877 issue of Scribner's Monthly. Lorenzo Butler Hickok spoke with McCall after the trial, and said that McCall showed no remorse.

As I write the closing lines of this brief sketch, word reaches me that the slayer of Wild Bill has been rearrested by the United States authorities, and after trial has been sentenced to death for willful murder. He is now at Yankton, D.T. awaiting execution. At the trial it was suggested that he was hired to do his work by gamblers who feared the time when better citizens should appoint Bill the champion of law and order – a post which he formerly sustained in Kansas border life, with credit to his manhood and his courage. (Note: McCall alleged that gambler John Varnes had paid him to murder Wild Bill. Varnes could not be found, so McCall then implicated Tim Brady in the plot. Brady had also disappeared from Deadwood and could not be found.)

Jack McCall was hanged on March 1, 1877 and buried in a Roman Catholic cemetery. The cemetery was moved in 1881, and the noose was still around McCall's neck when his body was exhumed.

=== Burial ===
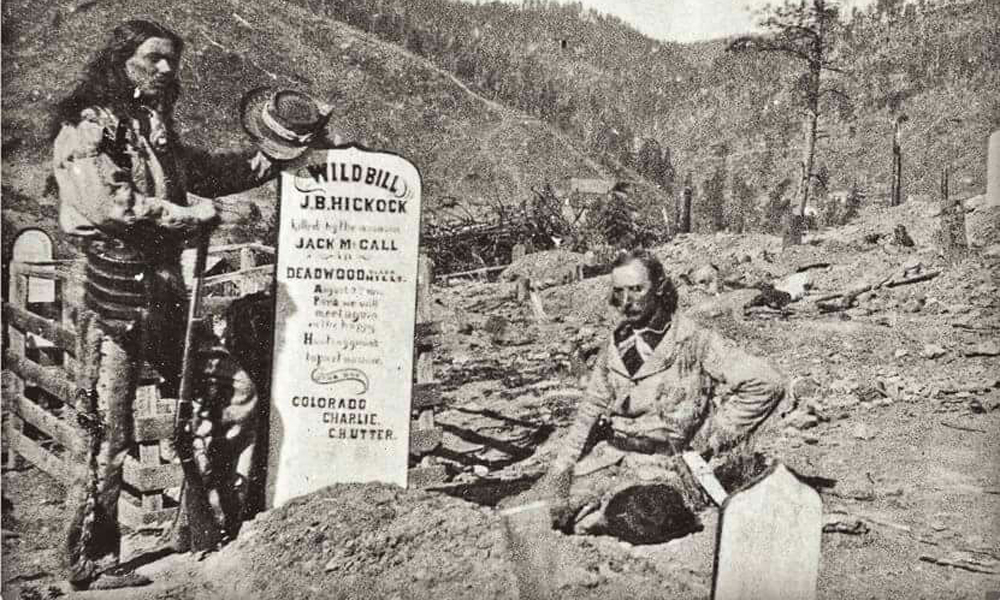
Arapaho Joe and Colorado Charlie Utter at Hickok's grave, photograph date unknown (sometime before 1915)

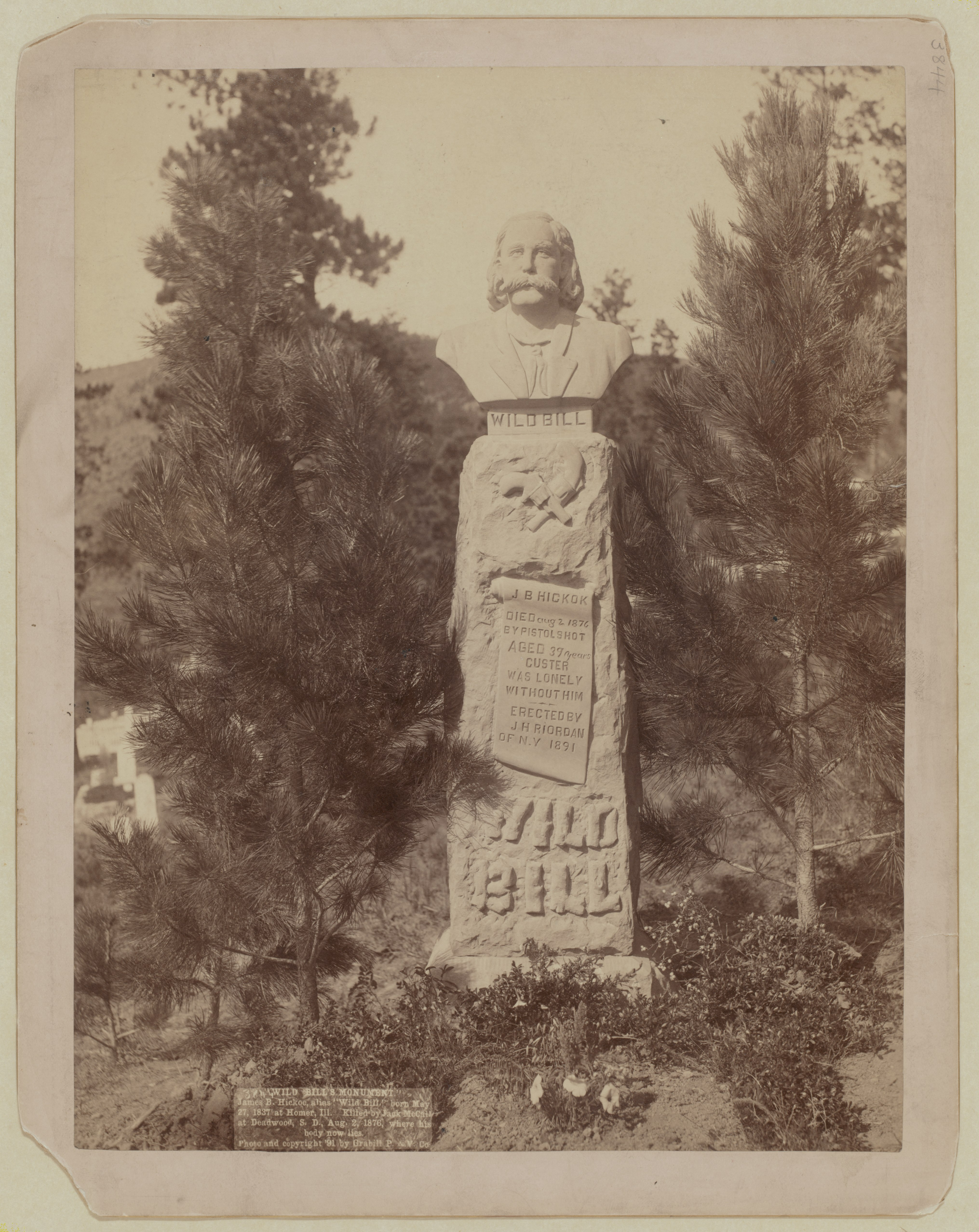
Hickok monument in 1891

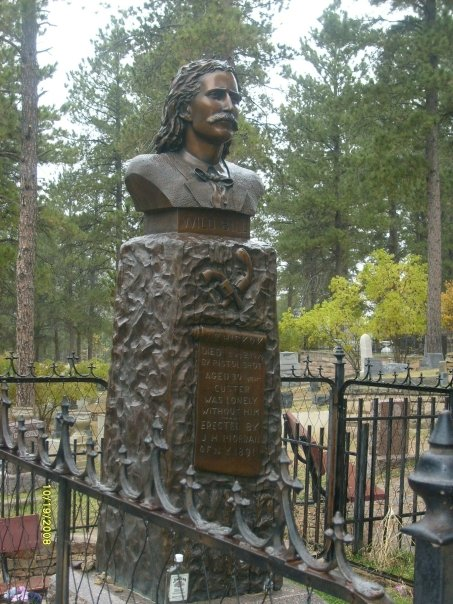
Hickok monument in 2008

Charlie Utter claimed Hickok's body and placed a notice in the Black Hills Pioneer:

Died in Deadwood, Black Hills, August 2, 1876, from the effects of a pistol shot, J. B. Hickock [sic] (Wild Bill) formerly of Cheyenne, Wyoming. Funeral services will be held at Charlie Utter's Camp, on Thursday afternoon, August 3, 1876, at 3 o'clock P. M. All are respectfully invited to attend.

Utter had Hickok buried with a wooden grave marker reading:

Wild Bill, J. B. Hickock [sic] killed by the assassin Jack McCall in Deadwood, Black Hills, August 2, 1876. Pard, we will meet again in the happy hunting ground to part no more. Good bye, Colorado Charlie, C. H. Utter.

Hickok is known to have fatally shot six men and is suspected of having killed a seventh. Despite his reputation, Hickok was buried in the Ingleside Cemetery, Deadwood's original graveyard. This cemetery filled quickly, and Utter paid to move Hickok's remains to the new Mount Moriah Cemetery in 1879, on the third anniversary of Hickok's burial. (Note: The old cemetery was in an area that was better suited for the constant influx of new settlers to live on, so the remaining bodies there were eventually also moved up the hill to the Mount Moriah Cemetery (in the 1880s).) Utter supervised the move and noted that Hickok had been imperfectly embalmed. As a result, calcium carbonate from the surrounding soil had replaced the flesh, leading to petrifaction. Joseph McLintock wrote a detailed description of the reinterment. McLintock used a cane to tap the body, face, and head, finding no soft tissue anywhere. He noted that the sound was similar to tapping a brick wall and believed that the remains weighed more than 400 lb (180 kg). Cemetery caretaker William Austin estimated 500 lb (230 kg). This made it difficult for the men to carry the remains to the new site. The original wooden grave marker was moved to the new site; it was destroyed by 1891 from souvenir hunters whittling pieces from it, and it was replaced with a statue. This, in turn, was destroyed by souvenir hunters and replaced in 1902 by a life-sized sandstone sculpture of Hickok. This, too, was badly defaced, and was then enclosed in a cage for protection. The enclosure was cut open by souvenir hunters in the 1950s, and the statue was removed.

Hickok is currently interred in a 10 ft (3 m) square plot at the Mount Moriah Cemetery, surrounded by a cast-iron fence, with a U.S. flag flying nearby. The flag never goes down on Mt. Moriah Cemetery, as Deadwood was granted permission by the U.S. Congress during World War I to fly the flag 24 hours a day to honor all veterans who have served their country.

Calamity Jane was reported to have been buried next to Hickok according to her dying wish. Albert Malter, Frank Ankeney, Jim Carson, and Anson Higby were on Calamity Jane's burial committee, and they later stated that Hickok had "absolutely no use" for Jane in this life, so they decided to play a posthumous joke on him by laying her to rest by his side.

=== Pistols known to have been carried by Hickok ===
Hickok's favorite guns were a pair of Colt 1851 Navy Model (.36 caliber) cap-and-ball revolvers. They had ivory grips and nickel plating, and were ornately engraved with "J.B. Hickok–1869" on the backstrap. He wore his revolvers butt-forward in a belt or sash (when wearing city clothes or buckskins, respectively), and seldom used holsters; he drew the pistols using a "reverse", "twist", or cavalry draw, as would a cavalryman. As Marshal of Hays, Hickok had an Adams and Deane percussion .44-caliber pistol.

At the time of his death, Hickok was wearing a Smith & Wesson Model No. 2 Army revolver, a five-shot, single-action, .32-caliber weapon, innovative as one of the first metallic cartridge firearms and favored by many Union officers during the Civil War. Bonhams auction company offered this pistol at auction on November 18, 2013, in San Francisco, California, described as Hickok's Smith & Wesson No. 2, serial number 29963, a .32 rimfire with a six-inch barrel, blued finish, and varnished rosewood grips. The gun did not sell because the highest bid of $220,000 was less than the reserve set by the gun's owners. A second pistol Hickok had at his death was a Sharps Model 1859 .32-caliber four-barreled rim-fire derringer.

== In popular culture ==
Hickok has remained one of the most popular and iconic figures of the American Old West, and is still frequently depicted in popular culture, including literature, film, and television. Actors who have played Bill are as follows:

- 1923 - Paramount Pictures' Western silent film Wild Bill Hickok (released on November 18, 1923) was directed by Clifford Smith and stars William S. Hart as Hickok. A print of the film is maintained in the Museum of Modern Art film archive.
- 1936 - Gary Cooper starred as Hickok in the movie The Plainsman (1936), which features the alleged romance between Calamity Jane and him as its main plot line. It is a loose adaptation of Hickok's life, ending with his famous aces-and-eights card hand.
- 1940 - Prairie Schooners is an American Western film directed by Sam Nelson, which stars Wild Bill Elliott as Hickok.
- 1951-1958 - Guy Madison and Andy Devine starred in the 1950s TV seriesThe Adventures of Wild Bill Hickok.
- 1953 -A later film (1953) and subsequent stage musical, both titled Calamity Jane, also portray a romance between Calamity Jane and Hickok. In the film version, Howard Keel co-stars as Hickok to Doris Day's Calamity Jane.
- 1954 - An episode of Gunsmoke on CBS radio featured John Dehner as Hickok. Hickok was sent from Abilene to arrest Matt Dillon (William Conrad) for the murder of a man he had thrown out of Dodge earlier that month. In the episode Dillon and Hickok are old friends.
- 1964 - Lloyd Bridges played Hickok in an episode of The Great Adventure.
- 1970 - revisionist Western film Little Big Man (1970), directed by Arthur Penn and starring Dustin Hoffman, Wild Bill Hickok is portrayed by Jeff Corey. The film presents Hickok as a larger-than-life but increasingly weary frontier legend, seen through the eyes of the film's fictional protagonist, Jack Crabb. Hickok's depiction emphasizes his declining eyesight and mythic reputation, blending historical detail with satire as part of the film's broader deconstruction of Old West heroism.
- 1977 - Charles Bronson starred as Hickok in The White Buffalo (1977), tells a tale of Hickok's hunt for a murderous white buffalo that follows him in his nightmares.
- 1989-1992 - ABC television series Young Riders, a fictional account of Pony Express riders, Hickok is portrayed by Josh Brolin.
- 1995 - A highly fictional film account of Hickok's later years and death, titled Wild Bill (1995), stars Jeff Bridges as Hickok and David Arquette as Jack McCall, and was written and directed by Walter Hill.
- 1995 - Bill was depicted as a character in an episode of Legend (TV series) by William Russ. The episode correctly relates Hickok's vision problems late in his life, and also includes his murderer, Jack McCall, although with an entirely fictionalized ending.
- 1999 - Sam Shepard portrays the town of Purgatory's sheriff, who is later revealed to be Wild Bill Hickok after his death, in the TV movie Purgatory.
- 2004–2006 - Wild Bill is played by Keith Carradine in the HBO series Deadwood (2004–2006).
- 2017 - Luke Hemsworth played a semifictionalized version of Hickok's time as marshal of Abilene, Kansas, titled Hickok (2017), with Trace Adkins as the Bull's Head Saloon keeper Phil Coe, Kris Kristofferson as Abilene mayor George Knox.
- 2018 - Hickok is a playable character in the board game Deadwood 1876 by Façade Games.
- 2018 - In the anthology movie The Ballad of Buster Scruggs, Scruggs refuses to play the dead man's hand upon entering a game of poker.

=== Memorials and honorable distinctions ===
Hickok's birthplace is now the Wild Bill Hickok Memorial and is a listed historic site under the supervision of the Illinois Historic Preservation Agency. The town of Deadwood, South Dakota, re-enacts Hickok's murder and McCall's capture every summer evening. In 1979, Hickok was inducted into the Poker Hall of Fame.

Abilene, Kansas hosts the Wild Bill Hickok rodeo every summer during the Central Kansas Free Fair.

== Notes ==
Police appointments
Preceded by Isaac "Doc" Thayer	sheriff of Ellis County, Kansas; August 23, 1869 – December 31, 1869	Succeeded by Peter R. "Rattlesnake Pete" Lanahan
Preceded by Thomas J. "Bear River" Smith	city marshal of Abilene, Kansas; April 15, 1871 – December 13, 1871	Succeeded by James A. Gauthie
