= Troy Grove, Illinois =

Troy Grove, Illinois Homer, Illinois
- Village
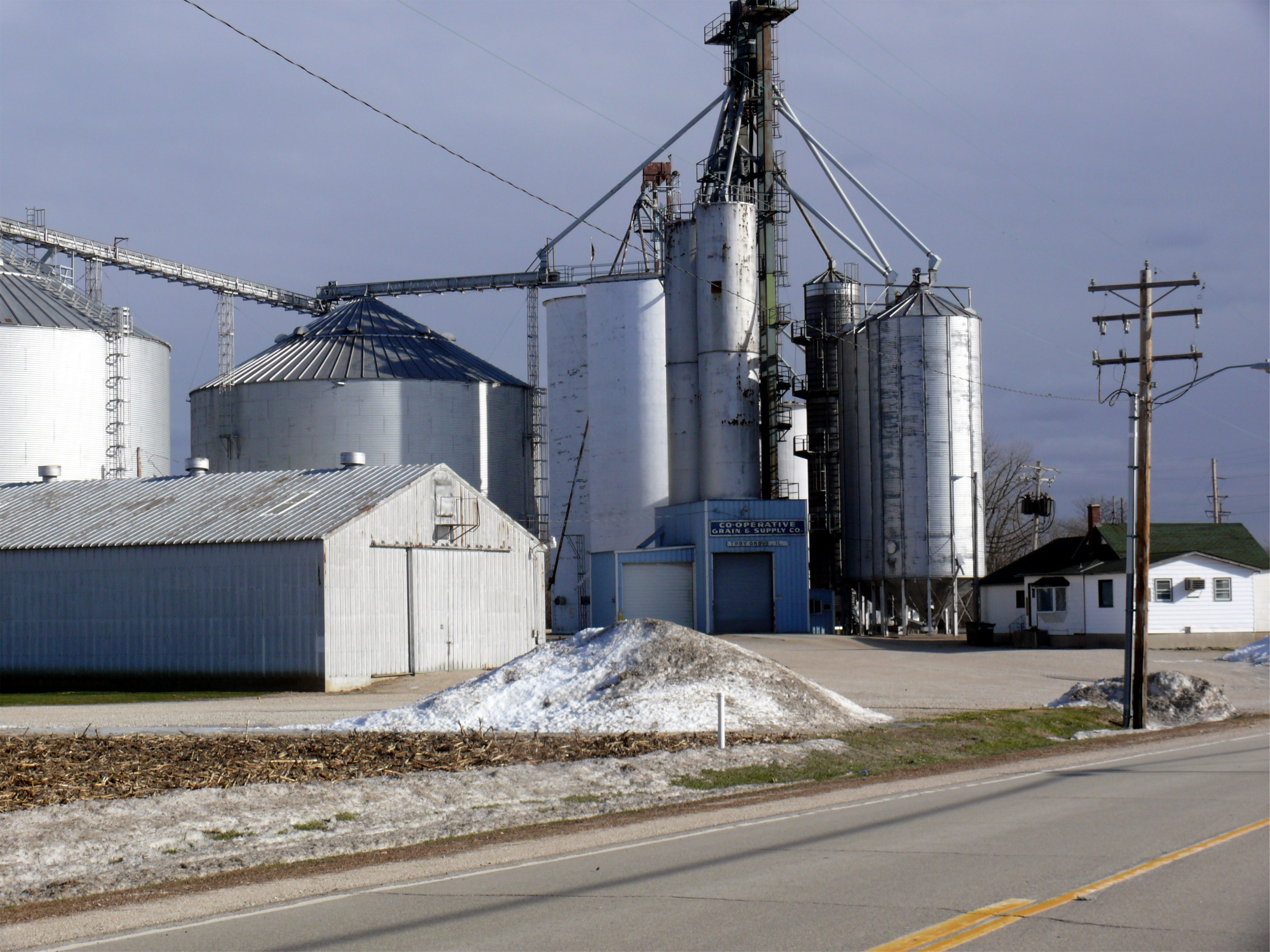
- Grain elevator in Troy Grove

- Location in LaSalle County, Illinois
- Coordinates: 41°27′57″N 89°04′54″W
- Country: United States
- State: Illinois
- County: LaSalle
- Township: Troy Grove
- Incorporated: April 3, 1886

Area
  - Total: 0.69 sq mi (1.78 km^{2})
  - Land: 0.69 sq mi (1.78 km^{2})
  - Water: 0 sq mi (0.00 km^{2})
- Elevation: 666 ft (203 m)

Population (2020)
  - Total: 225
  - Density: 327.6/sq mi (126.48/km^{2})
- Time zone: UTC-6 (CST)
  - Summer (DST): UTC-5 (CDT)
- ZIP code: 61372
- Area codes: 815 and 779
- FIPS code: 17-76225
- GNIS feature ID: 2400005

Troy Grove (formerly Homer) is a village in LaSalle County, Illinois, United States. The population was 225 at the 2020 census, down from 250 at the 2010 census. It is part of the Ottawa, IL Micropolitan Statistical Area.

Troy Grove is notable as the birthplace of Wild Bill Hickok and Kate Austin. It is home to the Wild Bill Hickok Memorial. The town also has another connection to the Wild West, as the last reported wild bison killed in Illinois happened near the town in 1837.

Silica sand, a fine white sand used in making glass, is mined in the vicinity of Troy Grove.

== History ==
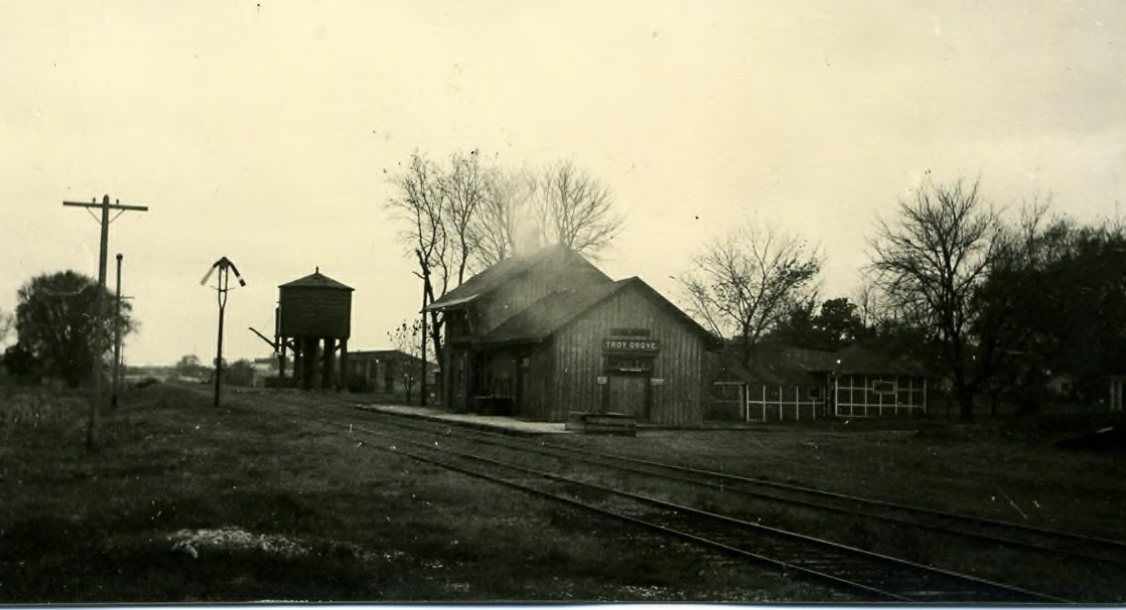
Troy Grove C&NW depot ca. 1920

Originally laid out as Homer, Illinois, the village was named by an early settler who emigrated from Homer, New York. As the town of Homer, Illinois already had a Post Office, the community took its name from a nearby grove, which was named for an early settler. A Post Office has been in operation under the name of Troy Grove since 1837.

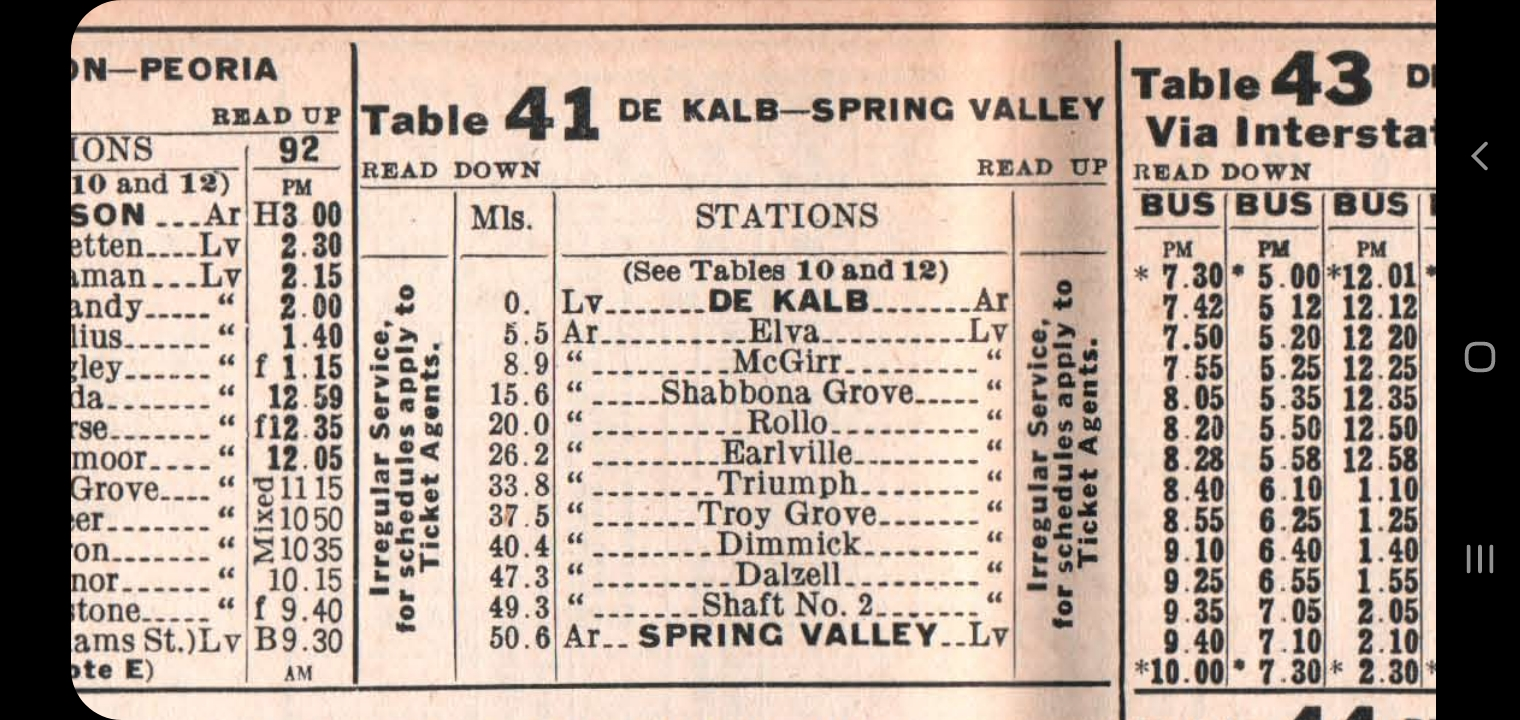
1939 C&NW Time Table listing the Troy Grove Depot

In the early 1830s a sawmill was built which facilitated the construction of a new schoolhouse in 1837. The village grew for several years and was home to several shops and businesses. The first store to open was owned by William Alonzo Hickok, father of Wild Bill Hickok. One of the first Presbyterian churches in the county was founded here in 1849 with a congregation of just 8 members. A gristmill was constructed in 1861

The village was previously served by the Northern Illinois Railroad and the Chicago & Northwestern Railroad. Passenger service was ended in the early 1950s. The railroad is today owned and operated by Union Pacific to haul raw material from the active silica mines.

== Geography ==
Troy Grove is located in northwestern LaSalle County. U.S. Route 52 passes through the north side of the village as North 37th Road; it leads northwest 8 miles (13 km) to Mendota and east 54 miles (87 km) to Joliet. Interstate 39 passes 1.5 miles (2.4 km) east of the village, with access from Exit 66 (US 52). I-39 leads north 62 miles (100 km) to Rockford and south 7 miles (11 km) to Interstate 80 at LaSalle.

According to the 2021 census gazetteer files, Troy Grove has a total area of 0.69 square miles (1.79 km^{2}), all land. The Little Vermilion River, a south-flowing tributary of the Illinois River, passes through the southeast corner of the village.

== Demographics ==
Historical population
| Census | Pop. | Note | %± |
|---|---|---|---|
| 1880 | 168 | | — |
| 1890 | 283 | | 68.5% |
| 1900 | 316 | | 11.7% |
| 1910 | 289 | | −8.5% |
| 1920 | 261 | | −9.7% |
| 1930 | 259 | | −0.8% |
| 1940 | 233 | | −10.0% |
| 1950 | 258 | | 10.7% |
| 1960 | 271 | | 5.0% |
| 1970 | 281 | | 3.7% |
| 1980 | 297 | | 5.7% |
| 1990 | 259 | | −12.8% |
| 2000 | 305 | | 17.8% |
| 2010 | 250 | | −18.0% |
| 2020 | 225 | | −10.0% |
U.S. Decennial Census

As of the 2020 census there were 225 people, 80 households, and 55 families residing in the village. The population density was 327.51 inhabitants per square mile (126.45/km^{2}). There were 106 housing units at an average density of 154.29 per square mile (59.57/km^{2}). The racial makeup of the village was 97.78% White, 1.33% from other races, and 0.89% from two or more races. Hispanic or Latino of any race were 4.89% of the population.

There were 80 households, out of which 46.3% had children under the age of 18 living with them, 52.50% were married couples living together, 11.25% had a female householder with no husband present, and 31.25% were non-families. 22.50% of all households were made up of individuals, and 7.50% had someone living alone who was 65 years of age or older. The average household size was 3.05 and the average family size was 2.63.

The village's age distribution consisted of 28.6% under the age of 18, 5.2% from 18 to 24, 25.7% from 25 to 44, 31.4% from 45 to 64, and 9.0% who were 65 years of age or older. The median age was 34.4 years. For every 100 females, there were 96.3 males. For every 100 females age 18 and over, there were 100.0 males.

The median income for a household in the village was $73,333, and the median income for a family was $83,438. Males had a median income of $61,250 versus $30,000 for females. The per capita income for the village was $34,519. About 10.9% of families and 9.6% of the population were below the poverty line, including 12.1% of those under age 18 and 15.8% of those age 65 or over.

== Notable people ==
- Ruth Emma Mitten (1876-1942), educator, superintendent of schools
