= Wild Bill Hickok Memorial =

Historic site in Troy Grove, Illinois

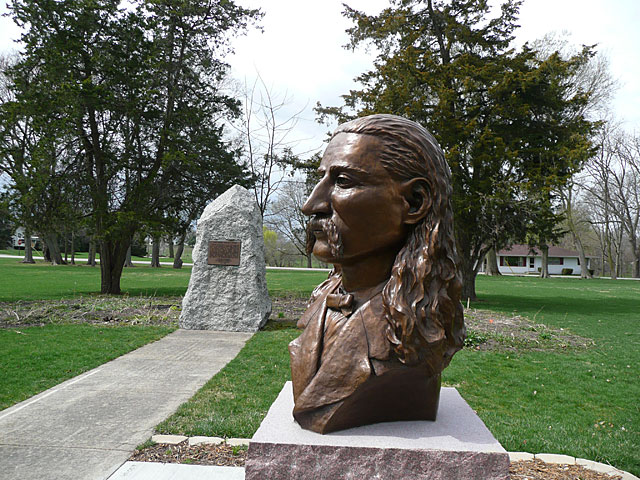
- Interactive map of Wild Bill Hickok Memorial
- Location: Troy Grove, LaSalle County, Illinois, U.S.
- Coordinates: 41°27′58″N 89°5′1″W
- Completion date: 1929
- Website: Official website

Wild Bill Hickok Memorial is a state historic site operated by the Illinois Historic Preservation Agency. It is located in a small park at the intersection of Main and Ottawa Streets in Troy Grove, Illinois. The memorial marks the site of the birthplace of "Wild Bill" Hickok and features a plaque on the granite monument that honors Hickok's services as a scout and spy in the western states during the American Civil War, and as a frontier express messenger. The monument was dedicated on August 29, 1930.

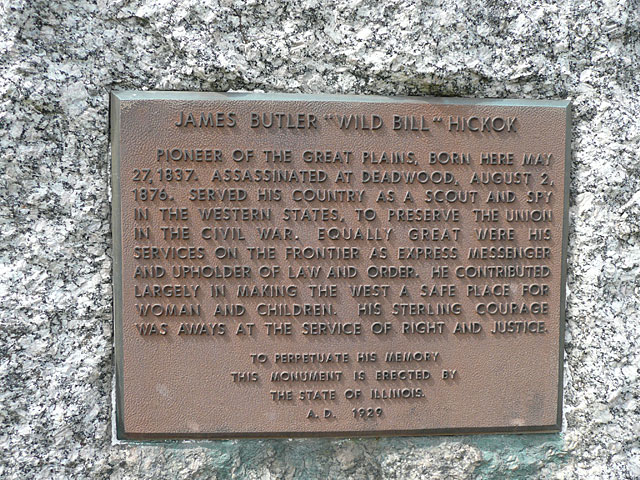
Plaque inscription.
