= Sumpter House =

19th century hotel, Arkansas

Coordinates: 34.512°N 93.055°W

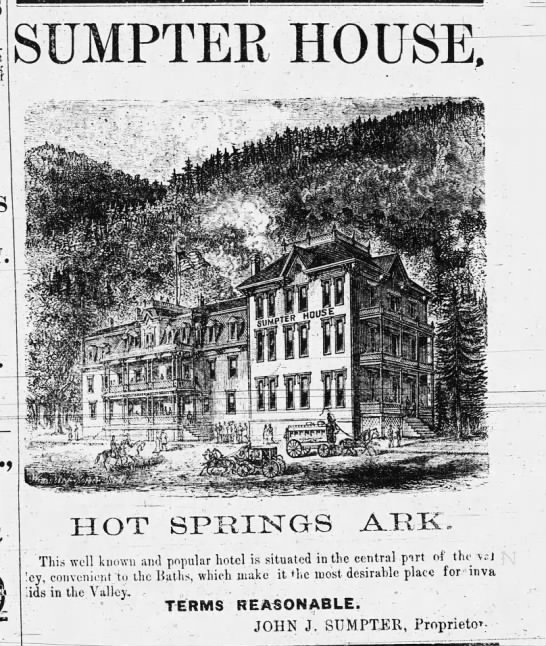
Drawing of the Sumpter House which was located about 200 feet from Central Avenue at the corner of Court and Exchange streets in Hot Springs, Arkansas

The Sumpter House was a centrally located hotel in Hot Springs, Arkansas during the mid 19th and early 20th century. It was located about 200 feet from Central Avenue at the corner of Court and Exchange streets. It was once one of the largest hotels in Hot Springs, Arkansas. For some time, the hotel was owned and operated by John J. Sumpter.

== History ==
John J. Sumpter's father, James Sumpter, was an early settler of Hot Springs, Arkansas and in 1844 purchased the land that the Sumpter House was built upon. James Sumpter was a sufferer of rheumatism and dyspepsia and when all of the remedies of his home physicians in Missouri failed, he, his wife Elizabeth and two sons, John and William, moved from Missouri to Hot Springs, Arkansas, a place then known for being a health resort.

The Sumpter brothers, William and John, and their mother built a small house that was, in 1889, adjoining the Sumpter Hotel, and began to keep boarders. The hotel was built by E. A. Sage, a resident of Hot Springs.

The Sumpter House was where Police Sergeant Tom Goslee escaped to and remained during the Gunfight at Hot Springs.

In the early 20th century, there was litigation among family members that occurred for several years over who the rightful owners of the Sumpter House were. A decision was made in July 1910, by Chancellor Curl.

By about 1913, a portion of the Sumpter House had become the West Mountain Hotel.
