= Road agent's spin =

Gunfighting maneuver

The road agent's spin, also known as the "Curly Bill spin" (after Curly Bill Brocius) or the "Border roll", was a gunfighting maneuver first identified in the days of the Old West. It was utilized as a ruse when forced to surrender a side arm to an unfriendly party.

== Description ==
Normal Old West procedure for surrender of a loaded pistol called for it to be handed over backwards (butt-first). A well-trained gunslinger could, upon demand for surrender, surreptitiously insert their forefinger through the trigger guard of the reversed pistol while extending it toward the party being surrendered to. When the other party reached for the pistol with their (presumably dominant) hand, a sharp, practiced motion of the wrist would pivot the gun around the forefinger, flipping it back into firing position for an immediate shot. This maneuver could also be done with the pistol upside down as well as backwards.

It is worth noting that the maneuver relied upon a suitably inexperienced or overly confident mark; an unwise captor might well underestimate their target's lethality and fail to carefully dictate the manner in which the surrendering party turned over their live weapon(s). A more experienced lawman or gunfighter could (and did) easily negate any trickery by a number of methods, including forcing the surrendering party to throw their gun(s) to the side or to return them to their holster, then drop their entire gun belt and step backwards several feet.

== Famous incidents ==
- In his autobiography, John Wesley Hardin claims to have demonstrated this technique to Wild Bill Hickok.
- Clint Eastwood recreated the border roll in a scene in The Outlaw Josey Wales where two buffalo hunters momentarily get the drop on him in an Indian agent's outpost.
- In the 1994 film Wyatt Earp, Curly Bill is depicted as using this method to ambush Sheriff White.
- In the 1993 film Tombstone Curly Bill is depicted as using this method to kill Sheriff White while feigning surrender.
