= Cavalry draw =

Method used to extract a pistol from a holster

Cavalry draw is a method used to extract a pistol from a holster, which is designed to carry the pistol butt forward.

== Origin ==
The name and technique come from the leather holsters used by the cavalry of both the United States Army and the Confederate States Army, during the Civil War. The pistol was in a covered holster carried high on the cavalryman's right side, but was placed butt-forward for crossdrawing by the left hand. The pistol was considered by the Army to be a secondary weapon, with the right hand used for the saber. Placement on the right permitted an alternative method to be used, allowing the right hand to draw the pistol if the sword were lost in battle.

In practice, however, the "alternative method" became the standard, with the sword being left in its sheath until the pistol and its spare loaded cylinders had been expended.

== Later use ==
Later, it was found that the reversed holster can be more comfortable, especially when worn while sitting down, than the normal type holster. In addition, cavalry draw can be performed while sitting, as well as retaining the original off-hand cross draw capability. For these reasons, the FBI used the cavalry draw when they were equipped with short .38 Special revolvers.

== Technique ==
External image
- Example of a cavalry draw

The cavalry draw is performed in three steps:

1. Rotate the wrist, placing the top of the hand toward the shooter's body.
2. Slip the hand between the body and the butt of the pistol, grasping the pistol's stock in normal shooting grip.
3. Draw the pistol, rotating the wrist to normal orientation as the arm is brought up to shooting position.

With practice, the cavalry draw can be as fast or even faster than drawing from a normal, butt-rearward holster, because of the assistance of the body in placement of the hand on the pistol stocks.

== History ==
Not all cavalry used this method of draw, or located their holsters on the right hand side of the body. In the "Manual of Arms for the Sharps Rifle, Colt Revolver and Swords (1861)", which was used by the Union Army, the revolver would have been worn on the left side, in front of the sabre-hook. To draw the revolver, the soldiers were instructed to "pass the right hand between the bridle-arm and the body, unbutton the pistol-case, seize the pistol at the butt, draw it".

"Wild Bill" Hickok was known to have used this draw style to great effect.

In modern times, some SASS members use the form of carry.

== Use in media ==
The characters Zorro (James Vega, played by John Carroll) in the 1937 film serial Zorro Rides Again, and Zorro (Diego Vega, played by Reed Hadley) in the 1939 film serial Zorro's Fighting Legion, both carry their pistol in a cavalier holster, with a sword and/or whip in the other hand.

The villain Liberty Valance uses the strong side cavalry draw in John Ford's The Man Who Shot Liberty Valance (1962).

The character of Sam Chisolm (played by Denzel Washington) in the 2016 movie The Magnificent Seven plays a bounty hunter and gunfighter who carries his pistol in a cavalier holster. It was alluded that the character fought for the Union in the Civil War.

The character of Rick O'Connell (played by Brendan Fraser) in the 1999 movie, The Mummy, uses this draw technique with guns on both left and right sides.

The primary antagonist character, Charlie Prince (played by Ben Foster) in the 2007 film 3:10 to Yuma carries two Smith & Wesson Model 3 Schofield Revolvers both worn in cavalry draw holsters.

Several characters in video game Red Dead Redemption 2, and the Red Dead series, use the cavalry draw method, including Micah Bell (played by Peter Blomquist) and gang co-founder Hosea Matthews (played by Curzon Dobell).

Wild Bill Hickok, as portrayed in the television show Deadwood, also uses the cavalry draw, which is seen 57 minutes into the first episode.
