= Ruth Emma Mitten =

American educator (1876–1942)

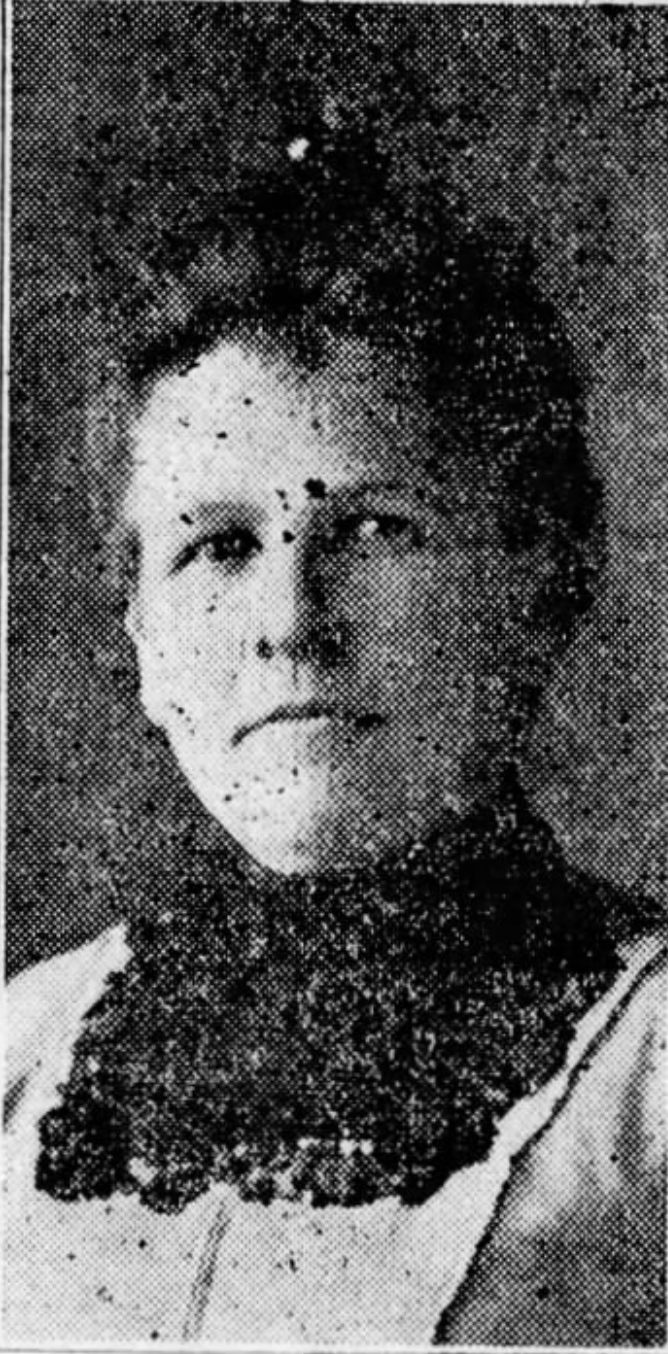
- Mitten in 1914
- Born: 1876; Troy Grove, Illinois, U.S.
- Died: November 9, 1942 (aged 65–66); Wichita, Kansas, U.S.
- Occupations: educator; county superintendent of schools

Academic background
- Education: Illinois Normal University; University of Illinois at Champaign

Ruth Emma Mitten (1876–1942) was an American educator who served for five consecutive terms as county superintendent of schools of Harvey County, Kansas. Employed in educational work during her entire career, she enjoyed many distinctions as a teacher and as a school administrator.

== Early life and education ==
Ruth Emma Mitten was born at Troy Grove, Illinois. She came of a family of educators and farmers. The Mitten family originally came from England to New Jersey in Colonial times. Mitten grew up on her father's Illinois farm.

Mitten's grandfather was born in New Jersey in 1810, and brought his family to LaSalle County, Illinois, in its early days. He farmed there, but finally retired and lived with Mitten's father and afterwards went to Chicago, where he died. He married a Miss Dunn, who died at Steward, Illinois.

J. H. Mitten, Ruth's father, was born near Newark, New Jersey, in 1837, and when a young man, moved west to Troy Grove, Illinois, where he married. He was an active farmer in Illinois for many years, but in 1896, moved to Kansas and bought a farm 2.5 miles (4.0 km) east of Newton on First Street. He owned a quarter section there. Politically, he was a prohibitionist and was an active member of the Christian Church (Disciples of Christ). He was a soldier in the Union Army in an Illinois regiment of infantry.

J. H. Mitten married Almira Bell Ransbarger. She was born at Troy Grove, Illinois, in 1839, and died on the Kansas homestead in January 1916. They were the parents of a family of ten children, Ruth being the fifth in age. Ruth's siblings included Philena Ellen, Catherine Rebecca, Lucetta Angeline, Charles William, David Oliver, Grace, Louis W., Inez Estelle, and John Franklin.

She attended local schools, and in 1894, graduated from the high school of Mendota, Illinois. While a teacher in LaSalle County, she completed her education in the Illinois Normal University (renamed Illinois State University) at Normal, Illinois and also took special work to fit her for teaching in the University of Illinois at Champaign. All this time, for five years, she taught in rural, graded, and high schools.

== Career ==
Coming to Kansas in 1902, Mitten made her home at Newton, where her parents had lived. Her first teaching in Kansas was as principal of a grade school in El Dorado for one year, but subsequently, she taught in Harvey County, either in rural schools or the city schools of Newton.

Mitten was elected county superintendent in the fall of 1910. She was re-elected in 1912, 1914, 1916, and 1918. In 1912, there was no opposing candidate, and in 1916, she was favored by an even larger majority than she had in 1914. Mitten was a democrat and was chosen on that ticket, though politics was not so much an element in her election as her generally recognized qualifications for the position. During her tenure, she solved difficult issues regarding the redistricting of territory and changing boundaries. She also opposed using money raised by taxation for German Schools, asserting that she did not intend to allow any community in the county to violate the law.

Mitten had a large and well organized school service under her supervision, the county having 75 schools, 125 teachers and an enrollment of 5,730 students. Mitten's offices were in the courthouse at Newton, and since beginning her term as county superintendent, she made her home in Newton.

Mitten was also active in church affairs as a member of the Christian Church. She served as superintendent of the junior department of the church and filled various other offices in the church.

She was a member of the Macon Township Grange, belonged to the Woman's Christian Temperance Union, and was a member in good standing of the Harvey County and the State Teachers' associations.

== Personal life ==
After resigning from her superintendent position, effective September 1, 1920, she retired and moved to Montana but returned to Kansas four years before her death.

Ruth Emma Mitten died in Wichita, Kansas, on November 9, 1942.
