= Davis Tutt =

19th-century American Old West gambler

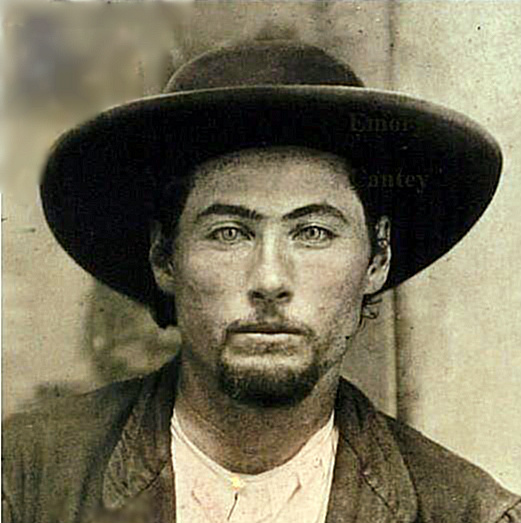
- Born: Davis Kasey Tutt c. 1836; Yellville, Arkansas
- Died: July 21, 1865 (aged 28–29); Springfield, Missouri
- Cause of death: Gunfight in Wild Bill Hickok – Davis Tutt shootout
- Occupations: Gambler and soldier
- Parents: Hansford Tutt (father); Nancy Anne Rose (mother)

Davis Kasey Tutt (c. 1836 – July 21, 1865) was an American Old West gambler and former soldier, best remembered for being killed during the Wild Bill Hickok – Davis Tutt shootout of 1865, which launched Wild Bill Hickok to fame as a gunfighter.

Tutt was born in Yellville, Arkansas, son of Hansford Tutt, a member of a politically influential family in Marion County, Arkansas, and his first wife. When he was a boy, Tutt's family became involved in the Tutt-Everett War, during which his father and other family members were killed.

Enlisting in 1862 in Company A, 27th Arkansas Infantry Regiment, Davis Tutt fought for the Confederate States of America in the Trans-Mississippi Theater during the American Civil War. At its end, he decided to go west, stopping first in Springfield, Missouri, where he met Wild Bill Hickok. Despite serving on opposite sides during the war, they became friends and often gambled together. Tutt even loaned Hickok money on occasion. Historians have debated the amount, but Hickok himself stated he owed Tutt $25. The fall out between Tutt and Hickok was due to Hickok's failure to repay the money he owed, worsened by Tutt taking Hickok's watch as collateral. Hickok allowed Tutt to take it, but warned him to never wear it in public, which Tutt ignored.

Hickok approached the square and called out Tutt. Tutt responded and the two men faced each other. Each fired one shot. Tutt missed, while Hickok's shot pierced Tutt's heart, killing him.
