= John J. Sumpter =

American politician

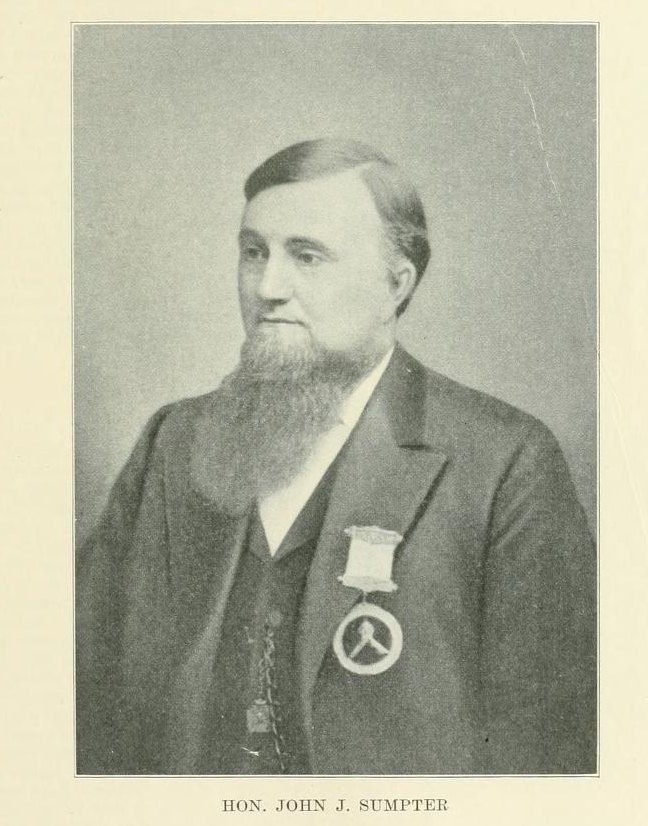
- John J. Sumpter - Arkansas state legislator

Member of the Arkansas Senate from the 31st district
- In office 1889–1891

Member of the Arkansas House of Representatives 1871
- In office 1873–1874

Personal details
- Born: July 7, 1842 Warrenton, Missouri
- Died: June 22, 1899 (aged 56) Hot Springs, Arkansas
- Party: Democratic
- Spouse: Nancy "Nannie" Etter Cayce (m. 1866)
- Relations: Thomas Sumter (great-grand-uncle)
- Children: 3
- Occupation: Military officer, proprietor of Sumpter House, lawyer, politician

Military service
- Allegiance: Confederate States of America
- Branch/service: Confederate States Army
- Rank: Colonel
- Unit: Company F of the 3rd Arkansas Cavalry Regiment
- Battles/wars: American Civil War; Sherman's March to the Sea; Carolinas campaign; Battle of Rivers' Bridge

John J. Sumpter (July 7, 1842 – June 22, 1899) was a lawyer and state legislator in Arkansas, military colonel, hotel proprietor, and lived in Hot Springs, Arkansas, for nearly all of his life. He served in the Arkansas House of Representatives and the Arkansas Senate.

== Life and education ==
He was born July 7, 1842, in Warrenton, Missouri, to James and Elizabeth Sumpter. His father with John and the rest of his family then moved to Arkansas in October 1843, and then to Hot Springs, Arkansas, in 1844.

John was a great grandson of Captain William Sumter and therefore great-grand-nephew to Brig. General Thomas Sumter, who Fort Sumter was named after.

He married Miss Nancy "Nannie" Etter Cayce from Tennessee on November 8, 1866, in Little Rock, Arkansas, and with whom he had two sons (John J. Jr and Orlando H.) and a daughter (Mary L.).

He was appointed as a grand steward for the local Masonic Grand Lodge in 1871. Then proceeded to raise in the ranks to be the state grand master in 1883 and 1884. He also was a member of the Ancient and Accepted Scottish Rite and of the Knights Templar.

He was a member of the Methodist Episcopal Church, South.

He studied law and was admitted to the bar in 1876.

His son Orlando H. "O.H." Sumpter, was a practicing attorney in Hot Springs for more than 50 years and also served as a county judge, state senator, and City Attorney and on the Arkansas Democratic state committee. At the time of his death, he was the oldest practicing attorney in Hot Springs.

His other son, John J. Sumpter Jr., when a constable was involved in the Arkansas Airship Mystery of 1897, during the airship wave of 1896-1897. Allegedly, he and Deputy Sheriff John McLemore were investigating reports of cattle rustling near the community of Jessieville when they came across an unexpected sight.

== Civil War ==
When the American Civil War started he enlisted as a private in the Confederate army joining Company F of the 3rd Arkansas Cavalry Regiment. During his service he served under General Forrest, Van Dorn and Wheeler and was involved in more than 200 battles and skirmishes. By the end of the war he had been promoted to the position of a company commander where he commanded the retreat from Dalton, Georgia, to Savannah, Georgia, then on to North Carolina where the company surrendered in 1865. His last rank in the military was Colonel.

== Career ==
He was proprietor of The Sumpter House, a hotel in Hot Springs, Arkansas.

He became one of the foremost attorneys of Hot Springs, Arkansas and was a member of the firm, Rice, Sumpter & Peck.

He served as a member of the Arkansas House of Representatives in 1871, 1873 and 1874. In 1872 he was the secretary of the Rockport and Ouachita Railroad Company. From 1874 to 1876 he served as the sheriff of Garland County, Arkansas. He was a member of the Democratic convention from 1876 until 1884.

In July 1888 was unanimously nominated to be the Democratic representative for State Senator. He was duly elected and served as State Senator from 1889 to 1891.

In 1892 he also ran to be the Democratic nomination for congress, standing against the incumbent of 10 years Clifton R. Breckinridge.

== Death ==
He died June 22, 1899, at his home in Hot Springs, Arkansas, after a protracted illness.
