= List of cultural depictions of Wild Bill Hickok =

Wild Bill Hickok (1837–1876), lawman, gunfighter and gambler, of the American Wild West has been depicted many times and in many forms of media. It is difficult to separate the truth from fiction about Hickok who was the first "dime novel" hero of the western era, with his exploits presented in heroic form, making him seem larger than life. In truth, most of the stories were greatly exaggerated or fabricated by both the writers and himself. Along with the frontiersman Davy Crockett, Hickok also became one of the first comic book heroes.

== Television and radio ==
- Portrayed by Guy Madison in the 1951–58 television series The Adventures of Wild Bill Hickok, and the concurrent Mutual Broadcasting radio series of the same title, 271 half-hour programs originally broadcast from 1951–54.
- Played by Lloyd Bridges in a 1964 episode of the television anthology The Great Adventure.
- In a Quick Draw McGraw cartoon, a number of people are shown fleeing in terror from the gunfire of the notorious gunslinger, Wild Bill Hiccup. In actuality, his gun kept going off because he could not control his hiccups.
- Portrayed by Josh Brolin in the 1989–92 television series The Young Riders.
- Legends of the Hidden Temple had an episode entitled "Wild Bill Hickok and the Dead Man's Hand."
- Portrayed by William Russ in episode 1.06 of the 1995 television series Legend, "The Life, Death and Life of Wild Bill Hickok". The episode depicts him faking his own death so that he can retire peacefully.
- Portrayed by Gerard Buehler in the 1998 TV documentary series Gunfighters of the West narrated by Brian Dennehy
- Histeria! featured Hickok in the episode "North America"; he appears in a sketch where Lydia Karaoke hosts a game show in which her contestants must guess Hickok's occupation.
- Dramatized in the HBO series Deadwood, in which he is portrayed by Keith Carradine (2004).
- In the television film Doctor Who, the eighth incarnation of the Doctor dons a costume of Wild Bill, found in a hospital locker room. Subsequent depictions of the Eighth Doctor's have been shown to wear this costume.
- In an episode of the Fox News Channel documentary series Legends and Lies: The Real West entitled "Wild Bill Hickok: Plains Justice" (season 1, episode 3, original airdate April 19, 2015), actor Brian Merrick (who bears a striking resemblance to the historical figure) portrays Hickok. Devin Albert portrays Hickok as a young boy.
- Three episodes of Woody Woodpecker show a parody called "Wild Bill Hiccup" (in different physiognomies). The first one appears briefly in the episode Wild and Woody, as an alcoholic old man who hiccups repeatedly and has his own name written on the back of his vest. The second one appears in Sissy Sheriff, also briefly, but only in a wanted poster. The guy in that version looks younger than the first one, and hiccups once Woody reads his name out loud. But the most notorious is the third one, who appears in the episode which the title is his own name, and this time as the main antagonist. Physically different than the other versions, he is redheaded, shorter and fatter, and always hiccups when saying his own name.
- Wild Bill Hickok appears in multiple episodes of The Legend of Calamity Jane, voiced by Clancy Brown. He is depicted as an old friend of Jane's who helps her on several occasions despite his reservations toward the law.

== Films ==
- Played by William S. Hart in the 1923 film Wild Bill Hickok
- Played by Gary Cooper in the 1936 film The Plainsman, featuring Jean Arthur as Calamity Jane and directed by Cecil B. DeMille
- In The Three Stooges short Goofs and Saddles (1937) Moe Howard's character is known as "Wild Bill Hiccup".
- Played by Wild Bill Elliott in the 1938 serial The Great Adventures of Wild Bill Hickok
- Played by Lane Chandler in the 1940 serial Deadwood Dick
- Played by Wild Bill Elliott in the 1940 film Prairie Schooners
- Played by Wild Bill Elliott in the 1940 film The Wildcat of Tucson
- Played by Roy Rogers in the 1940 film Young Bill Hickok, directed by Joseph Kane
- Played by Richard Dix in the 1941 film Badlands of Dakota
- Played by Bruce Cabot in the 1942 film Wild Bill Hickok Rides
- Played by Reed Hadley in the 1950 film Dallas
- Played by Howard Keel in the 1953 film Calamity Jane; later made into a stage musical of the same name
- Played by Forrest Tucker in the 1953 film Pony Express
- Played by Tom Brown in the 1956 film I Killed Wild Bill Hickok
- Played by Robert Culp in the 1963 film The Raiders, directed by Herschel Daugherty
- Played by Don Murray in a remake of 1936 film with the same title The Plainsman (1966 film)
- Portrayed by Jeff Corey in the 1970 Arthur Penn film Little Big Man
- Portrayed by Charles Bronson in the 1977 film The White Buffalo
- Portrayed by Richard Farnsworth in the 1981 film The Legend of the Lone Ranger
- Portrayed by Jeff Bridges in the 1995 film Wild Bill
- Played by Sam Elliott in the 1995 film Buffalo Girls. (TV film)
- Played by Sam Shepard in the 1999 film Purgatory. (TV film)
- Portrayed by Luke Hemsworth in the 2017 film Hickok
- Played by Stephen Amell in the 2024 film Calamity Jane.

== Novels ==
- 1964: Little Big Man by Thomas Berger
- 1970: Civil War: #5 Under the Stars and Bars by J.T. Edson
- 1975: The White Buffalo by Richard Sale
- 1978: The Kent Family Chronicles: The Lawless, Volume VII by John Jakes
- 1980: Darlin' Bill: A Love Story of the Wild West by Jerome Charyn
- 1981: Aces & Eights by Loren D. Estleman
- 1982: Flashman and the Redskins by George MacDonald Fraser
- 1986: Deadwood by Pete Dexter
- 1990: Buffalo Girls by Larry McMurtry
- 1996: The Memoirs of Wild Bill Hickok by Richard Matheson
- 1999: The Return of Little Big Man by Thomas Berger
- 2004: And Not to Yield by Randy Lee Eickoff
- 2017: Dragon Teeth by Michael Crichton
- A Breed Apart by Max Evans

== Comic Books ==
- Classics Illustrated No. 121, Wild Bill Hickok, published by Gilberton Co., Inc., July 1954; interior art by Sal Trapani and Medio Iorio.
- Cowboy Western #62 Wild Bill Hickok 1957
- Young Wild Bill Hickok appears as part of The League of Infinity, a team of teenage heroes from different eras in Supreme (1994), written by Alan Moore.
- Hickok has a prominent secondary role in Vertigo's mini-series, Jonah Hex: Two Gun Mojo wherein he survived being shot but was buried alive, only to be made into a mindless "zombie" by the antagonist of the story.
- Hickok has a supporting role in the 1997-1998 DC Comics mini-series The Kents as a close friend of Nathaniel Kent, ancestor of Superman's adoptive father.
- Hickok was also mentioned in the Franco-Belgian comic series Lucky Luke in the book Calamity Jane 1967 by Morris and Rene Goscinny.
- The events surrounding Hickok's murder and his relationship with Calamity Jane are explored in Tex nos. 593–594–595 (March–May 2010).

== Music ==
- "Deadwood Mountain", Big and Rich
- "Wild Bill Hickup", parody by Spike Jones
- "The Ace of Spades", Motörhead
- "Rhymes of the Renegades", Michael Martin Murphey
- "The Burial Of Wild Bill", John Wallace Crawford, performed by Norman Blake on Flower From the Fields of Alabama
- "Philadelphia Lawyer" by Woody Guthrie
- "Rambling, Gambling Willie", Bob Dylan
- "Wild Bill," Blue Highway
- “Wild Bill Hickok,” Colter Wall
