= Hot Springs gunfight =

1899 gunfight in Arkansas, United States

Hot Springs Gunfight
Date	March 16, 1899
Location	Hot Springs, Arkansas

Belligerents
Hot Springs Police Department	Garland County Sheriffs Office

Commanders and leaders
Chief Thomas C. Toler †; Captain Lee Haley	Sheriff Bob Williams

Strength
4 officers 1 bartender	5 officers

Casualties and losses
4 killed 1 bystander wounded	1 killed 1 wounded

The Hot Springs gunfight, also known as the Hot Springs Shootout, was a gunfight on March 16, 1899, between two separate law enforcement agencies that occurred in Hot Springs, Arkansas. Control of gambling was the main issue.

== Background ==
The spa town of Hot Springs, Arkansas, had a long history of illegal gambling, which had developed into frequent violence by the late 19th century. Beginning in the 1870s, two factions—the Flynns and the Dorans—fought one another for control over the gambling inside the city of Hot Springs, which by that time had a population of around 10,000. The two factions were involved in numerous gunbattles in downtown Hot Springs during the course of that feud.

=== The Flynn–Doran feud ===
Frank Flynn was the leader of the Flynn faction. By 1883, Flynn was firmly in control of gambling in Hot Springs. Through bribes made to officers on the Hot Springs Police Department, he prevented intervention by local law enforcement. Deputies from the Sheriff's Office also worked for him on occasion, but Flynn gave priority to, and paid more money to, the city police department. Flynn owned seven gambling houses, and any who dared to enter the city and attempt to open up a rival gambling house were dealt with by the police. In 1884, however, former Confederate Army Major Alexander S. Doran arrived, opening gambling houses of his own. Doran had a reputation as being good with a gun, and attempts at intimidating him were ineffective.

Flynn challenged Doran to a duel not long after Doran's arrival. That ended with Flynn being shot once in the chest, but not fatally. There were numerous subsequent clashes between the two factions with several murders suffered and inflicted by both sides. Doran killed ten men during the struggle for control of Hot Springs gambling before he was killed in downtown Hot Springs in 1888. Flynn remained in business and continued to favor using the city police department to collect debts owed to him or to force competition to leave town.

=== Local politics ===
Thomas C. Toler was the chief of police during this period, having originally been hired in the early 1870s by the first Garland County sheriff, William Little. By the mid-1890s, Toler had a falling out with Mayor W.W. Waters, leading Toler to support William L. Gordon in the 1897 mayoral election. The Hot Springs Police Department had acquired a reputation for enforcing the will of the gambling factions, often assisting gambling houses with the collection of unpaid debts or forcing unwanted competition to leave town.

Gordon once again appointed Toler as police chief but ordered him to enforce new regulations that would restrict gambling activities. Toler disagreed, preferring a more liberal policy. He had strong contacts inside the gambling community, alliances he did not want to lose.

Toler and his police department opposed the new regulations, but County Sheriff Bob Williams supported the mayor. Coffee Williams, the sheriff's brother, was also his chief deputy. Coffee Williams, a heavy drinker, frequented the gambling houses but was otherwise considered competent in his duties. As tensions built between the two law enforcement agencies over the proposed crackdown on gambling, there were several heated verbal disputes between law enforcement officers. Although from the outside it would appear that the county sheriff was siding with the mayor to rid Hot Springs of gambling, in reality the clash was ultimately over whether the county sheriff's office or the city police department would control the illegal profits.

== Gunfight ==
=== The first encounter ===
On the morning of March 16, 1899, a meeting of Independent Party members took place at Hot Springs City Hall. Mayoral candidate C.W. Fry and several police officers were present, indicating that Toler now supported Fry for the upcoming election. After the meeting concluded, someone, whose identity was never known, met with Sheriff Bob Williams, informing him of everything said during the meeting. Williams stormed from his office and went downtown, where he happened to meet his friend Dave Young, who worked occasionally as a deputy. The two men entered the Klondike Saloon, where they discussed the earlier meeting, at around 1:30 p.m.

Meanwhile, Hot Springs Police Sergeant Tom Goslee was eating at the Corrinne Remington Cafe. After finishing his meal, Goslee went to the Tobe and York's barbershop at 614 Central Avenue to have his hair cut. He had left his .44 caliber revolver in his desk at the police station, but had with him a two-shot derringer. Williams and Young left the Klondike Saloon, heading to the corner of Spring Street, where they saw Goslee leaving the barbershop. Sheriff Williams called out to Goslee from across the street, and Goslee crossed over to meet with the pair. Goslee held out his hand to greet Williams, who ignored it and instead gave him a piece of paper containing the names of the men present during the political meeting. Williams then said in part, "I want to know what you mean by working against me." Goslee denied nothing, and responded calmly, then began to defend Chief Toler.

Williams called Goslee a liar and a coward and began to yell at him. When it appeared Williams was reaching for something under his coat, Goslee quickly drew his derringer, saying, "I want no trouble with you, as you are the sheriff of the county, but I will defend myself if forced to." Young then stepped between both men, placing a hand on each mans shoulder and saying, "Boys, boys, this will not do." Young would later tell a friend he believed Goslee would have killed Williams had he not stepped in.

Sheriff Williams opened his coat to show Goslee that he was not armed and continued to yell at him. Williams then saw his son, Johnny, who worked part-time as a deputy, walking out of the City Hall Saloon. Sheriff Williams walked to him to greet him. According to witnesses, Johnny passed his father a .44 caliber revolver, then took another from a friend for himself. Sheriff Williams then opened fire on Goslee, who returned fire with his two-shot derringer. His shots expended, Goslee then retreated under fire from both Sheriff Williams and his son.

Unscathed, Goslee escaped down an alley to the Sumpter House, where he remained until Chief Toler and another officer arrived to escort him to city hall. Toler notified prosecutor David Cloud, who after taking statements from witnesses and the two men, issued a warrant for the arrest of Sheriff Williams. Fourteen shots had been fired during the exchange, but no one had been hurt. Toler suggested that Goslee meet with Johnny Williams to try to patch things up with him before the situation worsened, and Toler himself would meet with Sheriff Williams. Toler then called a private meeting at his home, asking Goslee, C.W. Fry, Captain Lee Haley, Arlington Hotel owner Samual H. Stitt, and property owner George M. French to attend. In that meeting they discussed how to best lessen tensions between the two police agencies.

Toler then contacted Sheriff Williams to arrange a meeting at 5:30pm, which Williams agreed to but said it had to be short as his daughter Florence was having her 21st birthday party. Sheriff Williams learned after his conversation with Chief Toler that his son Johnny was scheduled to meet with Sergeant Goslee. Williams then contacted his brother, Coffee, to accompany Johnny to that meeting.

=== The second encounter ===
Around 5:00 p.m. on the same day, Captain Haley and Sergeant Goslee walked down Central Avenue, meeting Johnny Williams, Coffee Williams, and Deputy Ed Spear in front of the Oliver and Finney grocery store. They greeted one another cordially, even jokingly, with Johnny Williams commenting that he wanted everyone to be his friend. Chief Toler and Captain Haley went to Lemp's Beer Depot, where Haley's brother-in-law, Louis Hinkle, was bartender. It was here they were to meet Sheriff Williams. Coffee Williams and Ed Spear soon joined them in the bar. It was after this that the encounter began to take a turn from bad to worse.

Haley told Spear, "Ed, I understand you have told people that if I put my head out, you're going to shoot it off." Spear seemed stunned for a moment, then replied that anyone who said that was lying. Louis Hinkle, standing behind the bar, became enraged. "Don't you make me out to be a liar," he told Spear. Then, with one swift motion, he grabbed Spear around the neck, pulled out a knife, and sliced Spear's throat. As Spear struggled to get himself free and stop the bleeding, Haley said to Hinkle, "For God's sake, stop!"

Hinkle, however, would not let go. Toler and Goslee moved quickly toward the struggle, but before they reached the men, Spear wrestled free, pulled his pistol, and shot Hinkle in the throat. As Hinkle staggered backward, wounded, Coffee Williams shot him in the chest one time. Goslee was then shot by Johnny Williams, who was outside the bar. Williams shot him twice, once in the right knee and once in the groin. Goslee returned fire, shooting Johnny Williams in the head but not killing him instantly. Coffee Williams then shot Goslee, killing him.

Captain Haley had fled when the first shots were fired, leaving Chief Toler outgunned and alone. Toler began shooting at Coffee Williams, who ran into the street and took refuge behind a freight wagon. Ed Spear, still bleeding badly, began shooting at Toler, as did Coffee Williams. Toler returned fire toward both, hitting Spear in the shoulder. Toler then moved to get a better position on Coffee Williams. They exchanged shots, and Toler was hit twice, killing him. One bullet was fired from Coffee Williams, hitting Toler in the head, and one bullet was fired by Spear, hitting Toler in the chest. Either shot would have been fatal. When Toler went down, the shooting stopped. Toler, Goslee, and Hinkle lay dead, and Johnny Williams lay dying. Bystander Alan Carter had been wounded by a stray bullet. Spear was bleeding badly but would survive.

However, the shooting was not over. Hot Springs Detective Jim Hart was notified by concerned citizens and responded to the shootout. Sheriff Williams had arrived by that time, found his son dying, and received a full report of what had happened from his brother Coffee. Seeing Hart, Sheriff Williams walked over to him and said, "Here's another of those sons of bitches!" Williams then pointed his pistol and shot Hart point blank in the face. Deputy Will Watt, nephew to Sheriff Williams, leaned over the sheriff and fired two more bullets into Hart's already dead body. By this time, Chief Toler's wife had arrived. Instead of crying, she simply glared at Sheriff Williams, who told her, "Yes, we got Toler, and I wish we had you where he is now." Toler's wife immediately left, retrieved a gun from her house, and returned with the intent to shoot Sheriff Williams. However, he had left the scene. By 9:30 p.m., Johnny Williams died, bringing the total to five killed and two wounded.

== Aftermath ==
Constable Sam Tate and his deputy Jack Archer removed the bodies, taking them to Gross Funeral Home. Mayor Gordon called an emergency meeting and replaced Chief Toler with L.D. Beldin. Gordon and Beldin selected 150 men to carry out armed patrols of the city, but tourists began leaving in large numbers. Newspaper reporters from the Arkansas Democrat and the Arkansas Gazette converged on the town. The following day an inquest was held with Governor Daniel Webster Jones present. Sheriff Bob Williams, Ed Spear, Will Watt and Coffee Williams were charged with murder. All four were arrested but made bail.

A series of trials followed. Spear and Coffee Williams were found to have acted in self defense. The trials of Bob Williams and Will Watt ended in a hung jury based on conflicting testimony from witnesses. Jim Hart's wife, who was blind, later filed a $20,000 lawsuit against Bob Williams but lost. The tensions between the Hot Springs Police Department and the Garland County Sheriffs Office continued well into the early 20th century over the affair. Although Frank Flynn was forced out of town following the shootout by a "Citizens Commission" formed by Mayor Gordon, illegal gambling did not go away, and corruption within both law enforcement agencies remained.
