= Joseph G. Rosa =

British historian (1932–2015)

- Born: November 20, 1932; West London, England
- Died: January 17, 2015 (aged 82); Ruislip, England
- Occupations: Historian; Author; Researcher; Communications
- Years active: 1958–2013

Joseph G. Rosa (November 20, 1932 – January 17, 2015) was a writer of Western history, notable for his many publications about Wild Bill Hickok. Rosa's book, They Called Him Wild Bill: The Life and Adventures of James Butler Hickok, was published in 1964 and is considered to be the first authentic biography of Wild Bill Hickok, and was accepted by historians as the definitive work on the subject. (See the Publications List below for information on Rosa's 1974 updated version of his 1964 original book.)

== Family ==
Joseph G. Rosa was born November 20, 1932, in West London, England and grew up in Woodville Gardens, Ruislip, Middlesex. From an early age, Rosa loved movies, and especially Westerns, a passion that he shared with his father.

== Career ==
Joseph G. Rosa's first job was as a copywriter for a firm that printed postage stamps and bank notes for the United Kingdom. He served in the Royal Air Force Signals, stationed in the United Kingdom and in Malta during the 1956 Suez Crisis. Rosa spent much of his career working in the communications industry, retiring in 1999. Throughout his over 50-year career as an historian, researcher and author, he compiled over 25 books and many articles for historic publications. He was wary of glamorization. Joseph died at age 82 on January 17, 2015, in Ruislip, England.

== Opinion on personalities of The American Old West in print ==
Rosa stated that "[some believe] a biography of a character like Jim Miller or John Wesley Hardin is justified on reputation and a list of killings. I don't agree. People like Hickok, Masterson or Tilghman and to some extent, perhaps, Earp in some way contributed toward the expansion of the United States, whereas the Hardins, Jesse Jameses retarded things."

== Publications ==
- Some shooting, Mr. Hickok! - By Joseph G. Rosa, 1958
- They Called Him Wild Bill: The Life and Adventures of James Butler Hickok - By Joseph G. Rosa, 1964
- Alias Jack McCall, a pardon or death?: An account of the trial, petition for a Presidential pardon, and execution of John McCall for the murder of Wild Bill Hickok - By Joseph G. Rosa; Westerners, 1967
- The Gunfighter: Man or Myth? - By Joseph G. Rosa, 1969
- Wild Bill Hickok, Peacemaker - By Joseph G. Rosa, 1973
- The Pleasure of Guns: The Intricate and Beautiful Work of Famous Gunsmiths - By Joseph G. Rosa; Robin May, 1974
- They Called Him Wild Bill: The Life and Adventures of James Butler Hickok, 1974 (This is an updated and revised edition of Rosa's 1964 book of the same name after he spent nine years with six trips visiting the U.S. locations that knew Wild Bill.)
- Colonel Colt, London: The History of Colt's London Firearms, 1851-1857 - By Joseph G. Rosa, 1976
- An Illustrated History of Guns and Small Arms - By Joseph G. Rosa; Robin May, 1976
- Gun Law: A Study of Violence in the Wild West - By Joseph G. Rosa; Robin May, 1977
- Gunsmoke: A Study of Violence in the Wild West - By Joseph G. Rosa; Robin May, 1977
- J.B. Hickok, Deputy U.S. Marshal - By Joseph G. Rosa, 1979
- The West of Wild Bill Hickok - By Joseph G. Rosa, 1982
- An Illustrated History of Guns and Small Arms - By Joseph G. Rosa; Robin May, 1984
- Guns of the American West - By Joseph G. Rosa, 1985
- Colt revolvers and the Tower of London - By Joseph G. Rosa, 1988
- Rowdy Joe Lowe: Gambler With a Gun - By Joseph G. Rosa; Waldo E Koop, 1989
- Buffalo Bill and His Wild West: A Pictorial Biography - By Joseph G. Rosa; Robin May, 1989
- Wild Bill - By Joseph G. Rosa, 1992
- The Taming of the West: Age of the Gunfighter: Men and Weapons on the Frontier, 1840-1900 - By Joseph G. Rosa, 1993
- Age of the Gunfighter: Men and Weapons on the Frontier, 1840-1900 - By Joseph G. Rosa, 1995
- Wild Bill Hickok: The Man and his Myth - By Joseph G. Rosa, 1996
- Jack McCall, Assassin: An Updated Account of his Yankton Trial, Plea for clemency, and Execution - By Joseph G. Rosa; English Westerners Society, 1999
- Wild Bill Hickok, Gunfighter: An Account of Hickok's Gunfights - By Joseph G. Rosa, 2003
- Wild Bill Hickok: Sharpshooter and U.S. Marshal of the wild West - By Joseph G. Rosa, 2004
- Wild Bill Hickok, Gunfighter: An Account of Hickok's Gunfights - By Joseph G. Rosa, 2013
