= Lionel Bordeaux =

Lakota educator and university president (1940–2022)

- Born: Lionel Raphael Bordeaux; February 9, 1940; Rosebud Indian Reservation, South Dakota, U.S.
- Died: November 16, 2022 (aged 82)
- Occupation: Educator
- Years active: 1964–2022
- Known for: Sinte Gleska University president (1973–2022)

Lionel Raphael Bordeaux (Lakota: Wakinyan Wanbli, lit. 'Thundering Eagle'; February 9, 1940 – November 16, 2022) was a Sicangu Lakota educator, advocate, and president of Sinte Gleska University (SGU) from 1973 until his death in 2022. At the time of his death, he was the longest-serving college or university president in the United States. During his time as university president, SGU became the first tribal university in the United States, and became the first tribal higher learning institution to achieve both bachelor's and master's degree accreditation.

Bordeaux also helped found or served as a boardmember of several organizations, including the American Indian Higher Education Consortium, American Indian College Fund, Native American Rights Fund, and Phelps Stokes Fund.

== Early life and education ==
Lionel Raphael Bordeaux was born on February 9, 1940, in Mellette County, South Dakota, to Ella Bordeaux. He was raised by his grandparents, Alex Jr. and Mary (née Jordan) Bordeaux. He attended several schools in his childhood, including Horse Creek Day School, St. Mary's School in Winner, and other public schools in White River, South Dakota, and Lincoln, Nebraska. He later returned to Rosebud, where he graduated from St. Francis Indian School.

Bordeaux initially began attending classes at Black Hills State University (BHSU; then known as the Black Hills Teachers College). During that time, both his grandfather and brother died, and his mother gave up her beauty business in Sioux Falls. Due to the emotional toll, Bordeaux returned home to White River, where he shared a small house with his grandmother, mother, and adopted sister. He eventually returned to his studies with the support of his family.

Bordeaux graduated from BHSU in 1964 with a BA in composite history and social science and a minor in psychology.

== Career ==
=== Bureau of Indian Affairs ===
After graduation, he took with the Bureau of Indian Affairs (BIA) as a counselor on the Jicarilla Apache reservation in Dulce, New Mexico. He initially planned to pursue his BIA career indefinitely. In 1966, the BIA's management training program took him to Washington, D.C., and then to Dallas, Texas, between 1967 and 1969, where he became a vocational counselor. During this time, he took classes at Adams State College and George Washington University. Bordeaux later credited his time in Dallas with teaching him about the struggles of Native Americans who had been relocated by the federal government to large cities under the Indian Relocation Act of 1956.

In 1969, Bordeaux returned to South Dakota, settling in Pine Ridge, where he began acting as a guidance counselor and instructor at several area schools. He also enrolled at the University of South Dakota. There, he earned a master's degree in guidance and counseling and then prepared to apply as area director for the BIA.

=== Sinte Gleska University president ===
Between 1971 and 1973, Bordeaux pursued a PhD in educational administration at the University of Minnesota. He completed his studies, but before he could finish his dissertation, he was approached by Stanley Red Bird Sr., founder of Sinte Gleska University (SGU), who asked Bordeaux to leave his studies and become the university's president. Tribal leadership wanted Bordeaux to lead the college, due to his knowledge and respect of Sicangu language and culture. Bordeaux accepted, resigned from the BIA, and was inaugurated on February 3, 1973, by 12 medicine men.

Bordeaux pushed a focus on preserving Lakota culture in the college's curriculum. Under his leadership, SGU became the first tribal college to become a tribal university. SGU also became the first tribal college to become accredited at both the bachelor's and master's degree levels. Its first master's degree program was offered in elementary education.

=== Educational advocacy ===
Bordeaux was also an advocate for Native American rights, particularly in access to education. He was a founder of the American Indian Higher Education Consortium (AIHEC), World Indigenous Nations Higher Education Consortium (WINHEC), American Indian College Fund (AICF), and Tribal College Journal. He served as president of AIHEC and the National Indian Education Association. He was a boardmember of several organizations, including AICF, the Native American Rights Fund, the National Indian Education Association, the Phelps Stokes Fund, the South Dakota Indian Education Association, the South Dakota State Education and Planning Commission, and Americans for Indian Opportunity. He was also regent of the Haskell Indian Junior College in Lawrence, Kansas.

During his career, Bordeaux was appointed to two presidential committees on Native American education: the National Advisory Council on Indian Education and the advisory board of the White House Initiative on Tribal Colleges and Universities. He was also appointed co-chair of the White House Conference on Indian Education in 1991.

Bordeaux also served as a tribal leader on councils for the Rosebux Sioux Tribe and its reservation for 14 years, including as chair of the tribal education committee and board. He also assisted the formation of tribal colleges at the Lower Brule Indian Reservation and Yankton Indian Reservation.

== Personal life ==
Bordeaux married Barbara Colombe and had four children with her.

== Death ==
Bordeaux died on November 16, 2022. He is buried in St. Ignatius Catholic Cemetery in White River. At the time of his death, he was still president of SGU, and at that time he was the longest-serving college or university president in the United States.

On December 2, 2022, U.S. Representative for South Dakota Dusty Johnson entered into the record a memoriam speech in Bordeaux's honor. The 2023 South Dakota Legislature issued House Commemoration 8002 to celebrate his life.

== Accolades ==
Bordeaux received several honors and awards during his lifetime, including:

- 1983: Outstanding Educator of the Year, National Congress of American Indians
- 1988: Outstanding Indian Educator, National Indian Education Association
- 1993: Inducted into the South Dakota Hall of Fame
- 2018: Inducted into the National Native American Hall of Fame
- Outstanding Administrator of the Year and Alumni/Special Achievement Award, Black Hills State University
- Alumni/Distinguished Achievement Award, University of South Dakota
- Outstanding Educator of the Year and Human and Civil Rights Award, South Dakota Indian Education Association
- First Lifetime Achievement Award, National Indian Education Association
- American Indian Distinguished Achievement Award, American Indian Resource Institute
- J.E.K. Aggrey Medal, Phelps Stokes Fund
- Living Legend Award, National Indian Gaming Association
- Living Legend Award, National American Indian Enterprise Development

He has also been awarded honorary doctorate degrees from South Dakota State University, Augustana University, and WINHEC'S World Indigenous Nations University. Black Hills State University named him among their top 25 graduates.

Rosebud Indian Reservation observes a Lionel R. Bordeaux Day on his birthday, February 9. In 2018, South Dakota Governor Dennis Daugaard issued a proclamation that February 9, 2018, be celebrated statewide as Lionel R. Bordeaux Day.

Black Hills State University named one of their residence halls, Lionel R. Bordeaux Residence Hall, in his honor on October 10, 2017.
