= Rosebud Indian Reservation =

Indian reservation in South Dakota, United States

Coordinates: 43°17′40″N 100°39′22″W

Rosebud Sioux Tribe of the Rosebud Indian Reservation Siċaƞġu Lak̇ota Oyate (Lakota)
- Indian reservation
- Flag

- Location in South Dakota
- Tribe: Rosebud Sioux Tribe
- Country: United States
- State: South Dakota
- Counties: Gregory; Lyman; Mellette; Todd (all); Tripp
- Established: 1889
- Headquarters: Rosebud

Government
  - Body: Rosebud Sioux Tribal Council
  - President: Kathleen Wooden Knife
  - Vice-President: Lisa White Pipe
  - Treasurer: Louise "Wayne" Boyd
  - Secretary: Nicole Marshall

Area
  - Total: 5,103.214 km^{2} (1,970.362 sq mi)

Population (2020)
  - Total: 26,305
  - Density: 5.1546/km^{2} (13.350/sq mi)
- Time zone: UTC-6 (CST)
  - Summer (DST): UTC-5 (CDT)
- Website: rosebudsiouxtribe-nsn.gov

The Rosebud Indian Reservation (Lakota: Uƞjiƞjiƞtka Oyaƞke) is an Indian reservation in South Dakota, United States. It is the home of the federally recognized Rosebud Sioux Tribe, who are Sicangu, a band of Lakota people. The Lakota name Siċaƞġu Oyate translates as the "Burnt Thigh Nation", also known by the French term, the Brulé Sioux.

The Rosebud Indian Reservation was established in 1889 after the United States' partition of the Great Sioux Reservation, which was created by the Treaty of Fort Laramie (1868). The Great Sioux Reservation had covered all of West River, South Dakota (the area west of the Missouri River), as well as part of northern Nebraska and eastern Montana. Since its founding, the Rosebud reservation has been reduced considerably in size, as has happened with the other Lakota and Dakota reservations. Now, it includes Todd County, South Dakota, and certain communities and lands in the four adjacent counties.

== Tripp County land opening, 1908–1909 ==
On March 2, 1907, Congress enacted legislation authorizing the opening of unallotted Rosebud Reservation lands in an area including Tripp County, South Dakota, to settlement under federal homestead laws. Lands already allotted to tribal members, designated for state purposes, or reserved for townsites were excluded from the opening.

On August 24, 1908, President Theodore Roosevelt issued a proclamation establishing a lottery system to distribute the available homesteads. Qualified applicants registered between October 5 and October 17, 1908, with the drawing beginning on October 19. Successful applicants were assigned numbers determining the order in which they could select and enter land beginning in 1909.

The opening attracted 114,769 applicants, competing for 6,000 numbered opportunities to enter homesteads. Successful applicants began filing land claims in 1909, contributing to the rapid expansion of non-Native settlement and the development of towns and farms throughout Tripp County.

== Reservation boundary litigation ==
The legal consequences of the early twentieth-century land-opening acts remained disputed. In Rosebud Sioux Tribe v. Kneip (1977), the United States Supreme Court ruled that the acts of 1904, 1907, and 1910 demonstrated congressional intent to diminish the reservation's boundaries. The Rosebud Sioux Tribe had argued that opening unallotted land to settlement had not changed the reservation's original boundaries.

== Geography and population ==
The Rosebud Indian Reservation is located in south central South Dakota. It includes within its recognized border all of Todd County, an unincorporated county of South Dakota. The Oyate also have communities and extensive lands and populations in the four adjacent counties, which were once within the Rosebud Sioux Tribe (RST) boundaries: Tripp, Lyman, Mellette, and Gregory counties, all in South Dakota. Mellette County, especially, has extensive off-reservation trust land, comprising 33.35 percent of its land area. Some 40.23 percent of the Sicangu Oyate population lives here.

The total land area of the reservation and its trust lands is 1,970.362 sq mi (5,103.214 km^{2}) with a population of 10,469 in the 2000 census. The main reservation (Todd County) has a land area of 1,388.124 sq mi (3,595.225 km^{2}) and a population of 9,050. The RIR is bounded on the south by Cherry County, Nebraska, on the west by the Pine Ridge Indian Reservation, on the north by the White River, and originally, on the east by the Missouri River.

The Oyate capital is the unincorporated town of Rosebud where the tribal headquarters is located. It was established when the Spotted Tail Indian Agency territory extended to the banks of Rosebud Creek near its confluence with the Little White River. It was previously located in northwestern Nebraska.

The largest town on the reservation is Mission, served by the intersections of US Highways 18 and 83. Mission's near neighbor of Antelope is one of the many tribal band communities established in the late 1870s. Another major town in the reservation is Saint Francis, located southwest of Rosebud. Saint Francis, with a current population of about 469 (2020 census)., is the largest incorporated town in South Dakota without a state highway for access.

Located on the Great Plains, just north of the Nebraska Sandhills, Rosebud Indian Reservation has large areas of Ponderosa Pine forest scattered in its grasslands. Deep valleys are defined by steep hills and ravines, often with lakes dotting the deeper valleys.

== Economy and services ==
Major employers include Rosebud Sioux Tribe, Bureau of Indian Affairs, and Todd County School District. The RST owns and operates Rosebud Casino on U.S. Route 83 just north of the Nebraska border. Nearby is a fuel plaza, featuring truck parking and a convenience store. Power for the casino is furnished in part by one of the nation's first tribally owned wind turbines, which generate electricity. In the early 21st century, the tribe built a new residential development, Sicangu Village, along Highway 83 near the casino and the state line.

The Tribe also owns QCredit, an online financial services company. The Tribe works with financial technology vendor Think Finance for assistance with compliance management, risk management, and loan services.

Like numerous other Native American tribes, the Rosebud government decided to legalize alcohol sales on the reservation. It found that many residents went off reservation to buy alcohol in nearby towns. By legalizing the sale, the tribe can use sales taxes and other revenues generated for the welfare and health of the tribe. It can directly police and regulate the use of alcohol on the reservation in an effort to reduce abuses, and has established health programs for treatment.

The Wolakota Buffalo Range is a nearly 28,000-acre native grassland (11,000 ha) for a bison herd on the reservation. The Rosebud Economic Development Corporation (REDCO), the economic arm of the Rosebud Sioux Tribe, is managing the land. Established in 2020, the herd will help develop ecological restoration, cultural practices, economic development, food security and public education.

== Government ==
Under the Indian Reorganization Act of 1934, the federally recognized Rosebud Sioux Tribe (RST) re-established self-government. It adopted a constitution and bylaws, to take back many responsibilities for internal management from the BIA. It followed the model of elected government: president, vice-president, and representative council, adopted by many Native American nations. At the time and since then, many tribal members opposed the elected government, preferring their traditional form of hereditary clan chiefs selected for life, contingent on approval by women elders, and a tribal council that operated by consensus.

Both women and male elders have continued to have influence within the nation, particularly among those who have followed more traditional lives. At times political factions have developed and continued along ethnic and cultural lines, with full-blood Sioux following traditional ways. Others, sometimes of mixed-blood or having had more urban or European-American experiences, support the elected government. Enrolled members living on reservation number 21,245. The RST population is estimated at 25,000 (2005).

The short two-year terms of office can make it difficult for elected tribal officials to carry out projects over the long term. In addition, BIA officials and police retain roles on the reservations, which the historian Akim Reinhardt calls a form of "indirect colonialism".

- Law: charter, constitution, and bylaws (approved November 23, 1935)
- Governing Body: Rosebud Sioux Tribal Council (20 members)
- Executive Officers: President, vice-president, Secretary, Treasurer, and Sergeant-At-Arms

=== Elections ===
- Primary elections, fourth Thursday of August; general elections, fourth Thursday of October
- President and vice-president elected at large for two-year terms; Tribal Council elected from members' districts every two years; Council appoints the secretary, treasurer, and sergeant-at-arms
- Number of election districts: 13
- Proportion of representatives: one representative per 750 members

=== Council meetings ===
- Meetings are held twice a month on Wednesday and Thursdays.
- Quorum: Need 11 members
- Aired locally on Goldenwest Channel 93 and Rosebud Sioux Tribe YouTube Channel.

== Education ==
Sinte Gleska University is a Tribally-chartered higher education institution operating on the reservation. The university is named after the 19th-century Sioux war chief and statesman, whose name in English was Spotted Tail.

- St. Francis Indian School (Sicangu Oyate Ho, Inc.), in Saint Francis is a private Catholic institution first established as a mission school.
- St. Joseph's Indian School, Chamberlain, South Dakota
- Todd County High School, Mission, South Dakota (Todd County School District 66–1)
- White River School District K-12, White River, South Dakota
- Akta Lakota Museum & Cultural Center, located since 1991 in an adapted 1968 building on the campus of St. Joseph's Indian School.

== Media ==
- Rosebud Media Network: Hits 96 (KINI) is a commercial radio station and KOYA 88.1 FM is a non-profit radio station both located in St. Francis, South Dakota, and both are tribally owned.
- Newspaper: Todd County Tribune, Mission, SD.
- Newspaper: Sicangu Sun-Times, Rosebud. Founded in 1990 as an independent weekly, the newspaper is Sicangu-owned. It celebrated its 25th anniversary in 2015. The Sicangu Sun-Times is sold on newsstands across the Rosebud Indian Reservation and maintains a website at: sicangusuntimes.com. It also has newsstands in Winner, South Dakota; Valentine, Nebraska; and on three other South Dakota Indian reservations. Due to area poverty, the newspaper survives on limited advertising.

The Sun-Times is the only news outlet to cover political news on the reservation, along with police, court, and community news. An economic decline forced the paper to cut back to a monthly edition in 2010.

== Notable tribal members and residents ==
Notable Rosebud tribal members include:

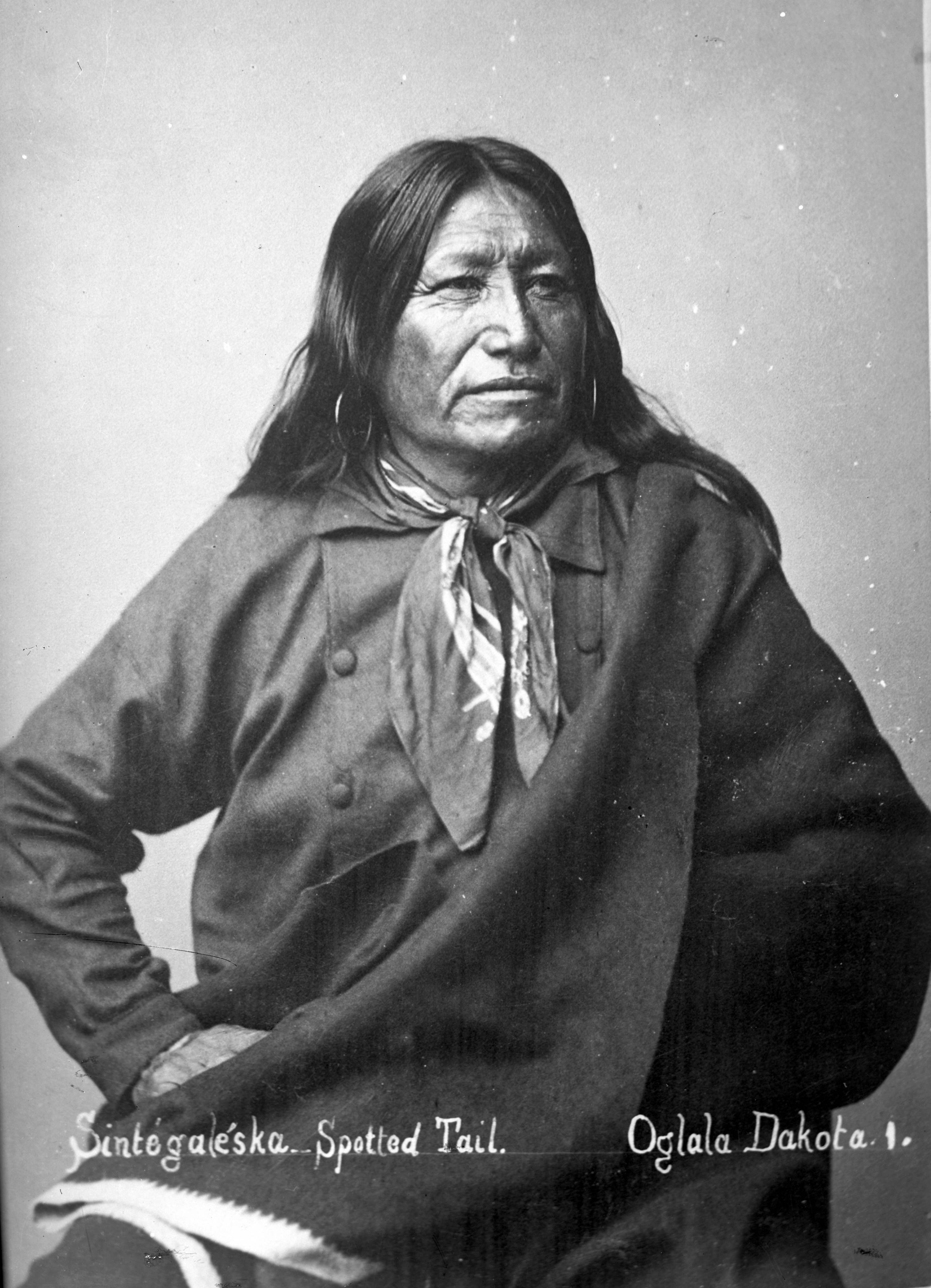
Chief Spotted Tail,
Brulé Lakota Leader

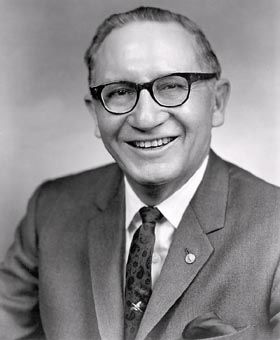
Ben Reifel "Lone Feather",
U.S. Representative, first Lakota Indian member of Congress.

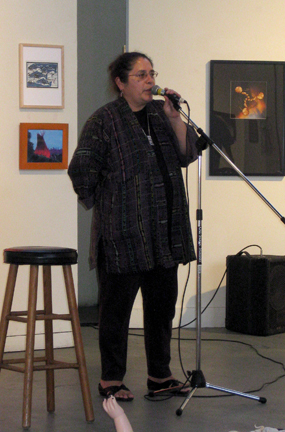
Janeen Antoine (Sicangu Lakota), curator, educator, and director of American Indian Contemporary Arts in San Francisco, grew up on the Rosebud Reservation.

- Susan Allen, the first Native American woman elected to the Minnesota state legislature, and the first openly lesbian Native American to win election to a state legislature.
- Janeen Antoine (Sicangu Lakota), curator, educator, and founder in 1983 of the American Indian Contemporary Arts in San Francisco, grew up on the Rosebud Reservation. Her gallery was one of the first in the nation to feature contemporary American Indian art and is important in encouraging new work. She is a co-host of Bay Native Circle, a weekly radio program broadcast on Wednesday evenings on Pacifica Radio station KPFA-FM, Berkeley.
- Bob Barker (1923–2023), game show host of The Price Is Right, the longest-running daytime game show in North American television history (1972–2007).
- Martin Brokenleg, is a psychologist and author in the fields of trauma, resilience, and Native American studies. An enrolled member of the Rosebud Sioux Tribe, he was a professor of Native American studies at Augustana University in South Dakota for 30 years.[1] He also served as Professor and Director of the Native Ministries Programme at the Vancouver School of Theology from 2004 to 2009.
- Belva Cottier (1920–2000), activist and social worker who planned the 1964 Occupation of Alcatraz.
- Paul Eagle Star, (1864–1891) (Brulé Sioux), member of Buffalo Bill's Wild West Show
- Troy Heinert (Rosebud Sioux), politician, businessman, and rodeo pick-up rider. He was elected to the South Dakota House in 2012 and to the SD Senate in 2014; he is Senate Assistant Minority Leader
- Hollow Horn Bear, son of Iron Shell, Sioux leader at the Fetterman Fight. He served as head of Indian police at the Rosebud Agency, and arrested Crow Dog for the murder of Spotted Tail.
- Chief Iron Shell, led the Brulé Orphan Band during the Powder River War of 1866–1868.
- Doris Leader Charge, Lakota instructor at Sinte Gleska University, dialogue coach on Dances with Wolves
- Joseph M. Marshall III, Lakota historian and writer, winner of the 2008 PEN/Beyond Margins Award for one of his histories
- Terry L. Pechota, American attorney who was the 32nd United States Attorney for the District of South Dakota; nominated by Jimmy Carter, confirmed by United States Senate 1979.
- Plenty Horses (1869–1933), a highly educated Lakota who was at the Drexel Mission Fight and was charged with the murder of Lieutenant Edward W. Casey soon after the Wounded Knee Massacre, but acquitted as the jury found a state of war had existed.
- Benjamin "Ben" Reifel (Rosebud Sioux) (1906–1990), five-term U.S. Congressman, served in the U.S. Army, worked as a field officer and regional administrator for the BIA, and earned master's and doctoral degrees in public administration from Harvard University. Reifel was elected as US Representative in 1960 and served until his retirement in 1971.
- Yvette Roubideaux (Rosebud Sioux), M.D., M.P.H., was Director of the United States Indian Health Service (IHS), appointed in 2009 as the first woman to hold the position.
- Chief Sinte Gleska, translated as "Spotted Tail" (1823–1881), was a war chief and later worked for peace. He was a Brulé Sioux relative of Crazy Horse. In 1868 he signed a peace treaty with the US in 1868 to cede lands. Sinte Gleska University, a Lakota Tribal college, is named for him.
- Richard Twiss (1954–2013), founder of Wiconi International ministry.
- Frank Waln, a Sicangu Lakota rapper
- Albert White Hat Sr.- Author, language teacher, and leader.
- Sandy White Hawk (born 1953), Founder, First Nations Repatriation Institute, writer, speaker, and indigenous rights activist.
- Dyani White Hawk (born 1976), Sicangu artist and former curator of All My Relations Arts gallery
- Chauncey Yellow Robe ("Kills in the Woods") (Canowicakte) (1867–1930), was an educator, lecturer and Native American activist. Raised in the Sicangu Lakota tradition, he was a founding member of the Society of American Indians. He fought for American Indian citizenship during the Progressive Era, and collaborated with American Museum of Natural History to produce silent drama The Silent Enemy, in which he starred as Chief Chetoga.

== Recent legal cases ==
In United States v. Sioux Nation of Indians, 448 U.S. 371 (1980), the people of the Rosebud Sioux Reservation joined the Oglala Lakota and other Sioux nations in suing the federal government in a land claim for its taking of the Black Hills in the late 19th century. In 1980 the case was heard by the United States Supreme Court, which agreed with the nations that the US had acted illegally in 1877. The US government offered financial compensation, which the Sioux have refused. They still demand the return of the land to their nation. The compensation fund is earning interest and has increased in value.

Members of the Rosebud Indian Reservation announced they were suing the federal government for its closure of the reservation's only emergency room, operated by the Indian Health Service, on April 28, 2016. The federal Centers for Medicare and Medicaid Services (CMS) refused to reimburse ER services due to poor conditions in November 2015. For seven months, citizens on the reservation lacked ER services; five babies were born in ambulances en route to the nearest hospitals—fifty miles away—and nine people died during transport to health facilities. CMS announced on July 14, 2016, that the emergency department would be reopened the next day.

While in Congress before 2018, former Representative Kristi Noem (R-South Dakota), now governor of South Dakota, authored legislation to improve conditions and staff at IHS facilities. She testified before Congress to gain support for the legislation.

In December 2020, the Jesuits returned 525 acres (212 ha) to the reservation. The scattered pieces had been given to them in the 1890s for religious use.

== Communities ==
The Rosebud Sioux Reservation has 20 communities represented on its tribal council:

- Antelope
- Okreek
- Parmelee
- Rosebud
- Saint Francis
- Spring Creek
- Two Strike
- Milks Camp
- Corn Creek
- Butte Creek
- Soldier Creek
- Upper Cut Meat
- Ring Thunder
- Black Pipe
- Bull Creek
- Swift Bear
- Grass Mountain
- Ideal
- He Dog
- Horse Creek
