= Joseph M. Marshall III =

American historian (1945–2025)

Joseph M. Marshall III (April 8, 1945 – April 18, 2025) was an American historian, writer, teacher, craftsman, administrator, actor, and public speaker of Native American descent. He was a founding board member in 1971 of Sinte Gleska University, the tribal college at the Rosebud Indian Reservation.

Marshall published numerous non-fiction books based on Lakota oral history and culture. His book, The Day the World Ended at Little Bighorn, won the 2008 PEN/Beyond Margins Award.

== Biography ==
Joseph Marshall III was born and raised on the Rosebud Indian Reservation in South Dakota, and is an enrolled member of the federally recognized Sicangu Oyate (Rosebud Sioux, Lakota) tribe. He was raised in a traditional Lakota household by his maternal grandparents, where his first language was Lakota. He grew up in the Horse Creek Community near White River (Maka Izita Wakpa, meaning "Smoking Earth River"). He learned English as a second language, but yet wrote and published in English.

After college, Marshall worked primarily as an English teacher at Todd County High School in Mission, South Dakota. In 1971, Marshall was a founding board member of Sinte Gleska University, the Sicangu Lakota's tribal college located at the reservation. He later taught at the college, helping develop a Native American studies curriculum.

Marshall helped form a non-profit advocacy group for Native American students and parents. He also worked as an educational and health programs administrator for the Rosebud Sioux Tribe. Along the way, he became a craftsman of traditional Lakota bows and arrows.

== Television ==
Marshall also worked as an actor, appearing in several episodes of The Real West. He worked in the mini-series Return to Lonesome Dove, adapted from novels in the Lonesome Dove series by Larry McMurtry. His most recent role was playing the elder, Loved by the Buffalo, in the Turner Network Television mini-series Into the West.

== Writing ==
Marshall wrote mainly historical non-fiction about Lakota history and culture. In 1998, Scholar Mona Kratzert praised his work for its intimate presentation of Lakota culture.

His works include the following:

- Keep Going
- Soldiers Falling into Camp: The Battles at the Rosebud and the Little Big Horn (1992, with Robert Kammen and Frederick Lefthand)
- Winter of the Holy Iron (1994)
- On Behalf of the Wolf and the First Peoples (1995)
- The Journey of Crazy Horse: A Lakota History (2004)
- The Day the World Ended at Little Bighorn (2008)
- In the Footsteps of Crazy Horse (2015)
- Sing For The Red Dress (2024)

He also wrote essays based on Lakota culture and collected stories:

- The Dance House: Stories from Rosebud (1998)
- How Not to Catch Fish: And Other Adventures of Iktomi
- The Lakota Way: Stories and Lessons for Living, (2002)
- Walking with Grandfather: The Wisdom of Lakota Elders (2005)
- Keep Going - The Art of Perseverance (2006)
- The Power of Four: Leadership Lessons of Crazy Horse

In 2008, his book, The Day the World Ended at Little Bighorn, won the PEN/Beyond Margins Arts. His fifth book, The Lakota Way: Stories and Lessons for Living (2002), was a finalist in the spiritual category for the prestigious "Books for a Better Life Award" from the Multiple Sclerosis Society of New York. It was also a finalist in the creative non-fiction category for the "PEN Center USA" award.

=== Death ===
Marshall died on April 18, 2025, at the age of 80 after battling a long illness, "leaving behind a powerful legacy of storytelling, cultural preservation, and education."
