= Cheryl Crazy Bull =

American academic administrator and Indigenous education activist

Cheryl Crazy Bull (Lakota: Wacinyanpi Win, lit. 'They Depend on Her') is an Native American academic administrator and Indigenous education activist. She has served as the president and chief executive officer of the American Indian College Fund since 2012. She was previously the third president of Northwest Indian College for ten years.

== Life ==
Crazy Bull is a member of the Sicangu Lakota Nation. She earned a B.S. in business administration with a management emphasis from University of South Dakota in 1979. She completed a M.Ed. in educational leadership at South Dakota State University.

Crazy Bull specializes in Native American issues, higher education, and tribal colleges and universities. She was a faculty member, department chair, dean of academic affairs, and vice president of administration at Sinte Gleska University. She was also the chief educational officer of St. Francis Indian School. Crazy Bull was the third president of Northwest Indian College for ten years. In 2012, Crazy Bull became the president and chief executive officer of the American Indian College Fund. In 2023, she was one of six winners of a Neighborhood Builders Social Equality Award from the Bank of America. She requested her $200,000 grant be awarded to the College Fund.
