= Doris Leader Charge =

American translator (1930–2001)

- Doris Millard (later Doris Leader Charge), from a 1956 newspaper
- Born: May 4, 1930; Rosebud Indian Reservation, South Dakota
- Died: February 20, 2001 (age 70); Mission, South Dakota
- Other names: Doris Millard, Doris Mae Bravebird, Doris Mae Brokenleg, Doris Mae Whiteface
- Education: Sinte Gleska University
- Occupations: Translator and educator
- Known for: Dances with Wolves (1990)
- Children: 6

Doris Leader Charge (May 4, 1930 – February 20, 2001), was an American translator and educator. She taught Lakota language and culture courses at Sinte Gleska University for 28 years, and worked on the film Dances With Wolves (1990) as a translator and dialogue coach; she also appeared on-screen in a minor part.

== Early life and education ==
Doris Leader Charge was born on the Rosebud Indian Reservation in South Dakota. She was raised by her grandmother. She attended He Dog Elementary School, St. Francis Indian School and St. Mary's School for Girls until she left school at age 14. At age 54, she earned a degree in education at Sinte Gleska University.

== Career ==
Doris Millard worked as a nurse's aide, a waitress, and a cook to support her family as a young woman and as a widow. Her son Gerald "Coco" Millard appeared in The Last Hunt (1956), when he was a toddler, and she traveled with him and her newborn daughter to Sioux Falls for the premiere.

Later, Leader Charge taught Lakota Sioux language and culture courses at Sinte Gleska University. She took a sabbatical from her college job to appear onscreen as "Pretty Shield" in Dances with Wolves (1990), and to serve as a translator and dialogue coach in the making of the film, working with actors to learn to speak their Lakota lines with accents appropriate to their characters' stories. "I thought they were pulling my leg," she said later, about being hired for the film. "Yeah sure, production companies come to South Dakota all the time looking for someone to translate Lakota." When the film won a 1991 Academy Award for Best Adapted Screenplay, she stood beside the screenwriter on stage and translated his acceptance speech into Lakota.

Leader Charge was also credited as language coordinator on the television miniseries Son of the Morning Star (1991). In 1992, she made a national speaking tour, addressing audiences about her experiences with bringing better representation to the popular screen.

== Personal life ==
In 1947, she married her first husband, Wallace Millard. They had three children and she was pregnant with their fourth when Millard died in a car accident in 1956. Her second husband was Air Force veteran Fred Leader Charge; they had two more children together. She died in 2001, at the age of 70. Her grave was moved to Black Hills National Cemetery.
