= Sicangu Village, South Dakota =

- Census-designated place
- Location within South Dakota Location within the United States
- Coordinates: 43°00′50″N 100°34′33″W
- Country: United States
- State: South Dakota
- County: Todd

Area
  - Total: 0.24 sq mi (0.62 km^{2})
  - Land: 0.24 sq mi (0.62 km^{2})
  - Water: 0 sq mi (0.00 km^{2})
- Elevation: 2,772 ft (845 m)

Population (2020)
  - Total: 276
  - Density: 1,162.0/sq mi (448.66/km^{2})
- Time zone: UTC-6 (Central (CST))
  - Summer (DST): UTC-5 (CDT)
- ZIP Code: 69201 (Valentine, NE)
- Area code: 605
- FIPS code: 46-58680
- GNIS feature ID: 2813064

Sicangu is an unincorporated community and census-designated place (CDP) in Todd County, South Dakota, United States, within the Rosebud Indian Reservation. It was first listed as a CDP prior to the 2020 census. The population of the CDP was 276 at the 2020 census.

It is in the southern part of the county, on the east side of U.S. Route 83. It is 1 mile (1.6 km) north of the Nebraska border and 21 miles (34 km) south of Mission.

== Demographics ==
Historical population
| Census | Pop. | Note | %± |
|---|---|---|---|
| 2020 | 276 | | — |
U.S. Decennial Census
