= KOYA =

- Rosebud, South Dakota; United States
- Broadcast area: Rosebud Indian Reservation
- Frequency: 88.1 MHz
- Branding: KOYA Radio 88.1 FM

Programming
- Format: Community radio

Ownership
- Owner: Rosebud Sioux Tribe
- Sister stations: KINI

History
- First air date: February 24, 2011

Technical information
- Licensing authority: FCC
- Facility ID: 173502
- Class: C1
- ERP: 51,000 watts
- HAAT: 195 meters (640 ft)
- Transmitter coordinates: 43°13′1″N 100°47′28″W

Links
- Public license information: Public file; LMS
- Website: koyaradio.org

KOYA (88.1 FM) is a Community radio station, owned and operated by the Rosebud Sioux Tribe. Licensed to Rosebud, South Dakota, the station serves the Rosebud Indian Reservation.

KOYA signed on February 24, 2011. The station was the result of 18 years of work, and had the blessings of the Rosebud Sioux tribe.

In 2024, KOYA received a grant from the Corporation for Public Broadcasting which allowed for technical upgrades. KOYA's specific grant was to replace and upgrade infrastructure to ensure emergency alerts could be sent by local and tribal authorities in emergencies.

== See also ==
- List of community radio stations in the United States
