= Upper Cut Meat, South Dakota =

Settlement in South Dakota, US

Coordinates: 43°14′50″N 101°06′15″W

Upper Cut Meat is a small settlement on the Rosebud Indian Reservation, Todd County, South Dakota, United States. It consists of 11 homes and several others in the surrounding area. The town has a Community Center and a basketball court, as well as a playground.
