= Hendrika B. Cantwell =

American pediatrician and educator (1925–2025)

- Born: Hendrika Bestebreurtje; May 3, 1925; Berlin, Germany
- Died: July 24, 2025 (aged 100)
- Citizenship: American
- Education: B.A. Barnard College, 1944; M.D., University of Rochester Medical School, 1949
- Known for: Advocate for abused and neglected children
- Spouse: William Cantwell

Hendrika Bestebreurtje Cantwell (May 3, 1925 – July 24, 2025) was a German-born American physician, professor emerita of pediatrics at the University of Colorado Denver, advocate for abused and neglected children and parenting educator. She was one of the first physicians in the United States to work for a child protection agency, serving with the Denver Department of Social Services from 1975 to 1989. Her work there brought her in contact with an estimated 30,000 cases of suspected child abuse and she testified as an expert witness in thousands of court cases. An author of peer-reviewed journal articles, book chapters, and teaching manuals on the detection and treatment of child abuse, she has also conducted workshops and training programs for professionals throughout Colorado. She was inducted into the Colorado Women's Hall of Fame in 1990.

== Early life and education ==
Bestebreurtje was born on May 3, 1925, in Berlin, Germany, to Dutch nationals; her father had been transferred by his firm to Berlin before her birth. She was the youngest of four children. At age 6 she moved with her family to Zürich, Switzerland. In November 1940 the family fled wartime Europe by traveling to the neutral port of Lisbon, Portugal. They booked passage on a Portuguese ship built to hold 300, which departed with 1,000 passengers and arrived in New York City in April 1941. Two years later Hendrika attained U.S. citizenship.

She earned her B.A. from Barnard College in 1944 at the age of 19, and enrolled at the University of Rochester Medical School, planning to specialize in pediatrics. After receiving her medical degree in 1949, she interned at Buffalo Children's Hospital. Following her internship, in 1952 she and her husband William Cantwell relocated to Denver, Colorado, attracted by the nearby skiing opportunities.

== Career ==
In 1954 Cantwell became a part-time physician for school immunization programs and well-baby clinics in Denver. From 1966 to 1975 she was a full-time staffer of Project Child, a neighborhood health program for low-income children. She also began teaching nursing students, medical students, pediatric residents, and pediatric nurse practitioners. She joined the University of Colorado Health Sciences Center as a clinical professor of pediatrics.

Cantwell became one of the first physicians in the country to work for a child protection agency when she was hired by the Denver Department of Social Services (DDSS) in 1975. Her hiring grew out of the 1973 death of a child whose case, it was alleged, had been mishandled by the department. Under Cantwell's direction, the DDSS opened a Family Crisis Center on its premises, to which parents could bring children suspected of being abused for interviews with physicians and social workers. If abuse was determined, the child could be kept at the facility and a juvenile court case would be opened within 48 hours. Up to 40 percent of girls questioned at the center admitted to having been sexually abused, and 98 percent of children under age 7 had been abused by family members or friends.

Concomitant with the establishment of the Family Crisis Center, more and more child abuse cases were filed in court. As Cantwell interviewed abusive parents, she realized that many were unaware of the reasons for their behavior. She said in an interview:

No one had listened to these parents. Most had been abused. ... They felt singled out by drunken fathers. It's normal to take our perceptions of child-rearing from our parents. It was amazing that they didn't realize how mistreated they were. Instead, they blamed themselves for being rotten kids. Schools had punished them for inattention, fighting, failing to do their work. But no one asked why they did poorly. Most painful was their recurring question, "Where were you when I needed protection?"

As many parents were considered unsuitable candidates for treatment due to dysfunctional upbringing, alcohol and drug addictions, and mental incapacity, DDSS social workers proposed that they be given parenting classes. Cantwell wrote a curriculum for court-ordered parenting education in 1975. These classes were led by teachers at the Emily Griffith Opportunity School for the next decade.

In her 14 years of work with the DDSS, Cantwell came in contact with an estimated 30,000 cases of suspected child abuse and neglect. She often served as an expert witness, with an estimated 95 percent of her court appearances coming on behalf of the prosecution. Her 1983 study of normal hymenal openings in young girls, published in Child Abuse & Neglect, was often cited as a determinant of whether sexual penetration had taken place.

Cantwell retired from the DDSS in August 1989. Thereafter she worked as a part-time consultant on child abuse and neglect for the Colorado State Department of Social Services, and continued to train nursing students, child advocates, and case workers to identify and assist child abuse victims. She conducted workshops throughout the state for "social workers, school employees, police officers, attorneys, doctors, public health and clinic nurses, judges, county officials, foster parents, and the general public". She published her research in peer-reviewed journals, book chapters, and teaching manuals. In 1996 she and her husband formally retired and moved to Driggs, Idaho, near the ski slopes of the Teton Range.

== Personal life ==
In 1945, she met her husband, William P. Cantwell (1921–2003), a law student, while skiing at Lake Placid, New York. They married in 1947 and had two sons and a daughter. William established his first legal practice in Buffalo, New York, while Hendrika interned in the Buffalo Children's Hospital. He practiced estate law for many years in Denver and was a past president of the Denver Bar Association, the Colorado Bar Association, and the American College of Probate Counsel.

Hendrika B. Cantwell died on July 24, 2025, at the age of 100.

== Awards and honors ==
Cantwell was honored with two proclamations of "Dr. Hendrika Cantwell Day", in 1983 by Governor of Colorado Richard Lamm and in 1989 by Mayor of Denver Federico Peña. The Colorado Bar Association established a Hendrika B. Cantwell Annual Award in 1983. Cantwell was inducted into the Colorado Women's Hall of Fame in 1990 and was the recipient of the C. Henry Kempe Award in 1991.

She was the subject of the television documentary Dr. Hendrika Cantwell, produced by the British Film Institute and aired on July 28, 1988, by BBC One.

== Selected bibliography ==
=== Book chapters ===
- Cantwell, Hendrika B. (1999). Helfer, Mary Edna; Kempe, Ruth S.; Krugman, Richard D. (eds.). The Neglect of Child Neglect. University of Chicago Press. pp. 347–373. ISBN 978-0226326238.
- Cantwell, Hendrika B. (1995). Hunter, Mic (ed.). Sexually Aggressive Children and Societal Response. SAGE. pp. 79–108. ISBN 978-0803971950.

=== Articles and papers ===
- Cantwell, Hendrika B. (1988). "Standards of Child Neglect". Denver Department of Social Services.
- Cantwell, Hendrika B. (1988). "Child sexual abuse: Very young perpetrators". Child Abuse & Neglect. 12 (4): 579–582. doi:10.1016/0145-2134(88)90075-0. PMID 3233523.
- Cantwell, Hendrika B. (1987). Physical Neglect. National Committee for the Child. ISBN 978-0937906590.
- Cantwell, Hendrika B. (1987). "Update On Vaginal Inspection As It Relates To Child Sexual Abuse In Girls Under Thirteen". Child Abuse & Neglect. 11 (4): 545–546. doi:10.1016/0145-2134(87)90080-9. PMID 3427515.
- Cantwell, Hendrika B. (1984). "Child Protective Services In Parental Mismanagement Of Diabetes". The Diabetes Educator. 9 (4): 41–43. doi:10.1177/014572178400900407. PMID 6559688. S2CID 12191014.
- Cantwell, Hendrika B. (1983). "Vaginal Inspection As It Relates To Child Sexual Abuse In Girls Under Thirteen". Child Abuse & Neglect. 7 (2): 171–176. doi:10.1016/0145-2134(83)90069-8. PMID 6685559.
- Cantwell, Hendrika B. (1981). "Sexual abuse of children in Denver, 1979: Reviewed with implications for pediatric intervention and possible prevention". Child Abuse & Neglect. 5 (2): 75–85. doi:10.1016/0145-2134(81)90024-7.

== Sources ==
- Nathan, Debbie; Snedeker, Michael (2001). Satan's Silence: Ritual Abuse and the Making of a Modern American Witch Hunt. iUniverse. ISBN 978-0595189557.
- Varnell, Jeanne (1999). Women of Consequence: The Colorado Women's Hall of Fame. Big Earth Publishing. ISBN 978-1555662141.
