= KINI =

Radio station in Crookston, Nebraska

- Crookston, Nebraska; United States
- Broadcast area: Rosebud Indian Reservation; St. Francis, South Dakota
- Frequency: 96.1 MHz
- Branding: "Hits 96"

Programming
- Format: Contemporary Hit Radio
- Affiliations: AP Radio

Ownership
- Owner: Rosebud Sioux Tribe
- Sister stations: KOYA

History
- First air date: January 26, 1978

Technical information
- Licensing authority: FCC
- Facility ID: 66334
- Class: C1
- ERP: 90,000 watts
- HAAT: 152.0 meters (498.7 ft)
- Transmitter coordinates: 43°7′50″N 100°54′2″W

Links
- Public license information: Public file; LMS
- Webcast: http://listen.streamon.fm/kini
- Website: Official website

KINI (96.1 FM) is a radio station broadcasting a CHR music format. Licensed to Crookston, Nebraska, United States, the station is currently owned by Rosebud Sioux Tribe and features programming from AP Radio and Premiere Networks.

KINI first signed on the air on January 26, 1978. It was founded and operated by the St. Francis Mission.

In 2017, KINI was sold by St. Francis Mission to the Rosebud Sioux Tribe for $1.00. The sale included the station’s building, 40 acres of land, and all broadcasting equipment. Following the transfer, the operations of the Tribe's existing non-commercial station, KOYA (88.1 FM), were moved into the KINI facility.
