= Sandy White Hawk =

American Indigenous activist

- Born: 1953 (age 72–73); Rosebud Indian Reservation, South Dakota, U.S.
- Children: Dyani White Hawk

Sandra "Sandy" White Hawk, Lakota name Cokata Najinn Winyan (born 1953), is a Native American (Sicangu Lakota) writer, speaker, and indigenous rights activist.

She is the founder and executive director of First Nations Repatriation Institute, the Elder in Residence at the National Native American Boarding School Healing Coalition in Minneapolis, Minnesota, she formed the First Nations Orphans Association, and she was named the 2017 Champion for Native Children by the National Indian Child Welfare Association

In October 2026, White Hawk and her daughter, visual artist Dyani White Hawk, appeared on the ICT Newscast to discuss her removal from her birth family and adoption by a white family. Their discussion addressed the abuse White Hawk experienced following her adoption and their experiences of overcoming intergenerational trauma.

== Early and personal life ==
White Hawk was born in South Dakota on the Rosebud Indian Reservation, the third of nine children. In 1955, at 18 months of age, she was adopted by a white missionary couple. In her memoir, A Child Of The Indian Race, she recalls being forcefully removed from her birth parents and being put into a red pickup truck by a social worker. On her adoption papers she was listed as "a child of the Indian race". White Hawk was abused by her adoptive mother, and both of her adoptive parents addressed her Native identity as "something to be despised, not celebrated". At age four, White Hawk and her adoptive parents moved to 400 miles from her birthplace, to Wisconsin.

White Hawk continued to struggle into her teenage years, beginning to drink and to do drugs. In the 1976, she gave birth to a daughter, Dyani White Hawk. Beginning in 1980, she entered recovery and got sober. On May 3, 1982, White Hawk and John Reynolds had a son, John Asher Reynolds. John dedicated his life to Dakota language preservation and land management, and died on October 20, 2024, at age 42.

In 1988, she returned home to the Rosebud Sioux Reservation in South Dakota, and to her people, the Sicangu Lakota. White Hawk shared, "When I first went home, my family actually said to me, ‘welcome home.’ My uncles sat me down and told me who I am".

White Hawk was given the Lakota name Chokta Najinn Winyan (Stands in the Center Woman). As of 2023, she lives in Shakopee, Minnesota with her daughter.

== Activism ==
=== First Nations Orphans Association ===
White Hawk's founding of the First Nations Orphans Association was inspired by a vision she had of fostered and adopted adults being welcomed home with a song. Prior to the association's establishment, she organized a Welcome Home Powwow for adoptees. White Hawk was featured in Blood Memory, and was filmed in the process of organizing a welcome home ceremony. As an adoptee herself, her story of isolation 400 miles from her birthplace is told during the film. Blood Memory was selected and won several categories at film festivals.

=== First Nations Repatriation Institute ===
White Hawk founded the First Nations Repatriation Institute (FNRI) in Minneapolis in 2012. The institute's primary objective is to provide a support system for First Nations individuals affected by foster care or adoption. FNRI aims to assist them in returning home, rediscovering their roots, and reclaiming their cultural identity. Additionally, the Institute strives to enhance the abilities and expertise of practitioners who work with First Nations people.

White Hawk has dedicated herself to promoting healing and reconciliation within her community. She has organized forums that bring together adoptees, fostered individuals, and their families, along with professionals. These forums aim to identify post-adoption issues and devise effective strategies to prevent the removal of First Nations children. Additionally, she founded a support group for adoptees and birth relatives in the Twin Cities Area, providing ongoing support and resources to those who need it.

=== Legal Rights Center of Minneapolis ===
White Hawk serves on the board of directors for the Legal Rights Center of Minneapolis, whose mission is "to work with our communities to seek justice and promote racial equity for those to whom it has been historically denied".

=== Association for American Indian Affairs ===
White Hawk serves on the board of directors of the Association on American Indian Affairs, which has served Native Country as a non-profit organization since 1922. The Association's primary objectives are protecting sovereignty, preserving culture, educating youth, and building capacity.

White Hawk has appeared on Red Hoop Talk, the organization's podcast. She was one of four guests for the podcast's Women's History Month episode.

=== Truth And Reconciliation Commission work ===
White Hawk was a commissioner for the Maine Wabanaki State Child Welfare Truth and Reconciliation Commission. She was also an Honorary Witness of the Truth and Reconciliation Commission on Residential Schools in Canada.

== Cited in studies ==
Sandy White Hawk has been cited in numerous studies focusing on the reunification of American Indian families and the experiences adopted and fostered individuals where victimization had played a significant role in the prediction of reunification. She was cited a study exploring the differences in the social connection to tribe and tribal enrollment of American Indian fostered and adopted adults in 2018 in Children and Youth Services Review. The study showed that reunified participants were 8 times more likely to be enrolled.

In February 2024, the academic journal, Child Abuse & Neglect, published a study titled "Longing to belong: The ambiguous loss of Indigenous fostered/adopted individuals." Indigenous Elder, White Hawk guided the study and contributed her expertise and experience to the project. She conceptualized the idea for the study, having spent many years facilitating adoptee support groups and welcoming home ceremonies in the Indigenous community. She also played a key role in developing the open-ended questions analyzed in this study and in collecting the original data.

Also in 2024, The Experiences of Adopted and Fostered Individuals Project conducted an analysis of data collected from 70 Indigenous individuals who had been fostered or adopted and went through reunification during their adulthood. To examine the experience of reunification, researchers employed inductive thematic analysis on the open-ended survey data provided by the participants. The study and its findings were published in volume 148 of Child Abuse & Neglect. White Hawk and her organization, FNRI were cited.

In 2021, in an earlier edition of the same academic journal, White Hawk and the First Nations Repatriation Institute (FNRI) were cited in "Abuse after abuse: The recurrent maltreatment of American Indian children in foster care and adoption," where some findings published highlighted that American Indian children were "more likely to report physical maltreatment, sexual maltreatment, and spiritual maltreatment recurrence."

in 2015, An article from the journal, First Peoples Child & Family Review, first published "Finding their way home: The reunification of First Nations adoptees." The FNRI and White Hawk were cited in this study to help explain that First Nation adoptees have more than a biological or birth family to return to, but also ancestral land and a tribe. According to adoptees, establishing a strong connection with their extended family and community plays a significant role in improving the experience of reunification.

== Writing ==
White Hawk released a memoir, A Child of the Indian Race, in December 2023.

== Documentary and Film ==
White Hawk is featured in The People's Protectors, a documentary directed by Leya Hale exploring the military service and cultural identities of Native American veterans who served during the Vietnam War. She is scheduled to join Hale for a discussion following a screening in Bloomington, Minnesota, on November 13, 2026, as part of the city's Indigenous film series.

White Hawk, who served as a communications specialist in the United States Navy during the Vietnam War, is one of four Native American veterans featured in Leya Hale’s documentary The People's Protectors, which premiered on Twin Cities PBS in November 2018. The film explores their military experiences, relationships with the United States government, and Indigenous traditions of community service and protection. White Hawk discusses intergenerational trauma and the complexities of military service for Indigenous people.

In February 2019, White Hawk and fellow documentary participant Valerie Barber were honoured for their military service at a ceremony hosted by Minnesota Governor Tim Walz and Lieutenant Governor Peggy Flanagan. White Hawk was unable to attend, and her recognition was accepted on her behalf. The ceremony’s organizer had met the two women at the documentary’s premiere.

White Hawk is scheduled to participate in a discussion with Hale following a screening of the film in Bloomington, Minnesota, on November 13, 2026, as part of the city’s Indigenous film series.

== Speaking engagements and training ==
White Hawk has been on panels and has spoken a numerous conferences across the United States. She continues to tell her story and advocate for others. In November 2023, she was the Keynote speaker at Washington State's Fourth Annual Indigenous Children Youth and Family Conference.

In her role as Founder and Director of the First Nations Reparation Institute, White Hawk participated at the 42nd Annual Protecting Our Children Conference in April 2024, put together by the National Indian Child Welfare Association (NICWA). During the conference, White Hawk facilitated, "a special meeting intended for American Indian and Alaska Native adoptees, former foster children, and birth parents. Birth parents are parents whose children were adopted out. Birth relatives are relatives who have a sibling, cousin, or other relative who was or is adopted out or in foster care." In her capacity as a trainer and speaker, White Hawk also led a group on Community Healing–Community Building.

On October 16, 2024, led and workshop called "Truth, Healing, and Reconciliation in Indian Child Welfare" focusing on the psychological outcomes for adoptees and former foster children, in an effort to provide a better understanding to service providers in the industry.

=== Tribal Training and Certification Partnership (TTCP) ===
White Hawk is a consultant and community trainer for the Tribal Training Certification Partnership for the University of Minnesota Duluth (UMD). The Tribal Training and Certification Partnership offers training and certification programs to Minnesota's child welfare workforce regarding the Indian Child Welfare Act (ICWA) and the Minnesota Indian Family Preservation Act (MIFPA). ICWA is a federal law that mandates the involvement of American Indian children in specific cases. MIFPA is Minnesota's version of ICWA, which offers enhanced protection to American Indian children, families, and tribal nations. All social workers must possess adequate knowledge of MIFPA, a state law that is applicable to ICWA cases, to ensure its proper application. The TTCP also trains the Minnesota Guardian Al Litem Program.

== See also ==
- Clyde Bellecourt (American Indian Movement)
