= Paul Eagle Star =

Paul Eagle Star (1866 – 24 August 1891) was a Lakota Sioux known for being a performer with Buffalo Bill's Wild West Show.

Eagle Star grew up on the Rosebud Indian Reservation in Dakota Territory. From November 1882 until 1888, he attended the Carlisle Indian Industrial School (CIIS) in Carlisle, Pennsylvania. In 1889, Eagle Star returned to the Rosebud Agency and began working in a blacksmith shop alongside fellow former CIIS student Frank Locke; during this time, it is also speculated that Eagle Star may have been a member of the Rosebud Indian Police. According to a correspondence between Oglala Sioux George Means and Captain R. H. Pratt, Eagle Star traveled to the Pine Ridge Indian Reservation during the Battle of Wounded Knee, but did not take part in the fighting.

== Buffalo Bill's Wild West show ==
Two years later, in early 1889, Eagle Star was contracted as a performer in "Buffalo Bill" Cody's Wild West show. As a member of the show, Eagle Star toured Belgium, Germany, and England. While performing in Sheffield, England, Eagle Star suffered a tragic accident that led shortly after to his early death. According to the Sheffield Evening Star and Telegraph, on August 14, 1891 Eagle Star's horse suffered a fall while exiting the performance arena after a show, causing a compound dislocation of one of Eagle Star's ankles. The following Saturday, due to infections to the injury, Eagle Star contracted tetanus. His leg was amputated in an attempt to save his life, but by Monday, Eagle Star had died from the infection while being treated at the Sheffield Royal Infirmary.

== Repatriation ==
At his death, Bill Cody had Eagle Star's remains buried in London's Brompton Cemetery, where fellow Lakota Surrounded by the Enemy had been buried after dying on an earlier Wild West tour. Eagle Star was survived by his wife and child. In March 1999, his remains were exhumed and transported to the United States. Eagle Star's two grandchildren, Moses and Lucy Eagle Star, accompanied the repatriation of their grandfather's remains. The reburial took place as a private ceremony in the Rosebud Lakota cemetery two months later.
