= Soldier Creek, South Dakota =

- Unincorporated community
- Location within South Dakota Location within the United States
- Coordinates: 43°19′30″N 100°52′32″W
- Country: United States
- State: South Dakota
- County: Todd

Area
  - Total: 12.24 sq mi (31.70 km^{2})
  - Land: 12.24 sq mi (31.69 km^{2})
  - Water: 0.0039 sq mi (0.01 km^{2})
- Elevation: 2,343 ft (714 m)

Population (2020)
  - Total: 205
  - Density: 16.8/sq mi (6.47/km^{2})
- Time zone: UTC-6 (Central (CST))
  - Summer (DST): UTC-5 (CDT)
- Area code: 605
- GNIS feature ID: 2584569

Soldier Creek is an unincorporated community and census-designated place in Todd County, South Dakota, United States, on the Rosebud Reservation. Its population was 205 as of the 2020 census. U.S. Route 18 passes through the community.

== Geography ==
According to the U.S. Census Bureau, the community has an area of 12.238 square miles (31.70 km^{2}); 12.235 square miles (31.69 km^{2}) of its area is land, and 0.003 square miles (0.0078 km^{2}) is water.

== Demographics ==
Historical population
Census	Pop.	Note	%±
2020	205		—
U.S. Decennial Census
