= Okreek, South Dakota =

Okreek
- Unincorporated community
- Location within the state of South Dakota Okreek (the United States)
- Coordinates: 43°21′12″N 100°22′57″W
- Country: United States
- State: South Dakota
- County: Todd

Area
  - Total: 45.05 sq mi (116.67 km^{2})
  - Land: 45.00 sq mi (116.55 km^{2})
  - Water: 0.046 sq mi (0.12 km^{2})
- Elevation: 2,346 ft (715 m)

Population (2020)
  - Total: 190
  - Density: 4.2/sq mi (1.63/km^{2})
- Time zone: UTC-6 (Central (CST))
  - Summer (DST): UTC-5 (CDT)
- ZIP codes: 57563
- FIPS code: 46-46660
- GNIS feature ID: 2584563

Okreek is an unincorporated community in Todd County, South Dakota, United States. As of the 2020 Census, the population was 190. The town is wholly within the jurisdiction of the Rosebud Indian Reservation, and the populace is almost entirely Sioux-American. Okreek consists primarily of two long blocks of inhabited tract housing, and has about 30 private telephone subscribers within town limits. There is also an elementary school and a Post Office which has been assigned the ZIP Code of 57563.

The name Okreek is a corruption of Oak Creek, a stream near the town site.

== Demographics ==
Historical population
Census	Pop.	Note	%±
2020	190		—
U.S. Decennial Census
