= White Horse, South Dakota =

White Horse, South Dakota Šuŋgská Oyáŋke
- Census-designated place
- Location in Todd County and the state of South Dakota
- Coordinates: 43°18′22″N 100°35′41″W
- Country: United States
- State: South Dakota
- Counties: Todd

Area
  - Total: 3.2 sq mi (8.3 km^{2})
  - Land: 3.2 sq mi (8.2 km^{2})
  - Water: 0.039 sq mi (0.1 km^{2})
- Elevation: 2,566 ft (782 m)

Population (2020)
  - Total: 234
  - Density: 87/sq mi (33.7/km^{2})
- Time zone: UTC-6 (Central (CST))
  - Summer (DST): UTC-5 (CDT)
- GNIS feature ID: 2393851

White Horse or Šuŋgská Oyáŋke (Lakota: "White Horse Community") is a census-designated place (CDP) in Todd County, South Dakota, United States. The population was 234 at the 2020 census.

== Geography ==
According to the United States Census Bureau, the CDP has a total area of 3.2 square miles (8.3 km^{2}), of which 3.2 square miles (8.2 km^{2}) is land and 0.04 square mile (0.1 km^{2}) (1.25%) is water.

== Demographics ==
As of the census of 2000, there were 180 people, 39 households, and 37 families residing in the CDP. The population density was 57.1 inhabitants per square mile (22.0/km^{2}). There were 39 housing units at an average density of 12.4/sq mi (4.8/km^{2}). The racial makeup of the CDP was 1.67% White and 98.33% Native American. Hispanic or Latino of any race were 0.56% of the population.

There were 39 households, out of which 76.9% had children under the age of 18 living with them, 25.6% were married couples living together, 61.5% had a female householder with no husband present, and 2.6% were non-families. No households were made up of individuals, and none had someone living alone who was 65 years of age or older. The average household size was 4.62 and the average family size was 4.32.

In the CDP, the population was spread out, with 51.7% under the age of 18, 12.2% from 18 to 24, 25.0% from 25 to 44, 10.0% from 45 to 64, and 1.1% who were 65 years of age or older. The median age was 17 years. For every 100 females, there were 91.5 males. For every 100 females age 18 and over, there were 61.1 males.

The median income for a household in the CDP was $24,545, and the median income for a family was $23,977. Males had a median income of $27,750 versus $25,000 for females. The per capita income for the CDP was $6,963. About 31.4% of families and 41.5% of the population were below the poverty line, including 53.9% of those under the age of 18 and none of those 65 or over.
