= Richard Twiss =

Richard Twiss - Taoyate Obnajin "He Stands with His People"
- Born: June 11, 1954; Rosebud Indian Reservation, South Dakota
- Died: February 9, 2013 (aged 58); Washington, D.C.
- Occupations: Educator, Author
- Spouse: Katherine Twiss

Richard Twiss (June 11, 1954 – February 9, 2013) was a Native American educator and author. He was a member of the Sicangu Lakota Oyate. He was the Co-Founder and President of Wiconi International (Lakota: Wee-choe'-nee, lit. 'life').

== Biography ==
Richard's father, Franklin "Buster" Twiss (May 7, 1927– August 17, 1999) was an enrolled member of the Pine Ridge Oglala Lakota tribe in South Dakota and was a SFC Army veteran. His mother, Winona LaPointe is from the Sicangu Lakota from the Rosebud Indian Reservation in Norris, South Dakota, and she attended the St. Francis Indian Mission School as a young girl through high school graduation.

In 1972, Richard Twiss was a participant in the forced occupation of the Bureau of Indian Affairs Building in Washington, D.C., with the radical political group, the American Indian Movement. Twiss later became a Christian minister, author, and public speaker. He married his wife Katherine in 1976 and had four grown sons, residing in Vancouver, Washington since 1981.

Richard Twiss was a founding board member of NAIITS: An Indigenous Learning Community.

Twiss was a Board Member of the Christian Community Development Association, founded by John M. Perkins in 1989.

In 2011, he earned a doctorate in Inter-Cultural Studies (cultural anthropology, primal and folk religions and the history of Christian mission) from Asbury Theological Seminary.

On February 6, 2013, Twiss suffered a major heart attack in Washington, D.C. He died on February 9, with his wife and sons at his side. His interment was next to his father at Black Hills National Cemetery.

== Works ==
- Twiss, Richard (July 9, 2015). Rescuing the Gospel from the Cowboys: A Native American Expression of the Jesus Way. Downers Grove, IL: IVP Books. ASIN B01316U4IW.
- Twiss, Richard (August 25, 2011). One Church Many Tribes - Serving Jesus the Way God Made You. Ada, MI: Chosen Books. ASIN B00LA9GUEK.
- Dancing Our Prayers
- Culture, Christ, & Kingdom Study Guide
