= Parmelee, South Dakota =

Parmelee, South Dakota Wósoso
- Census-designated place
- Location in Todd County and the state of South Dakota
- Coordinates: 43°19′27″N 101°02′28″W
- Country: United States
- State: South Dakota
- County: Todd

Area
  - Total: 5.80 sq mi (15.01 km^{2})
  - Land: 5.71 sq mi (14.80 km^{2})
  - Water: 0.081 sq mi (0.21 km^{2})
- Elevation: 2,654 ft (809 m)

Population (2020)
  - Total: 606
  - Density: 106.1/sq mi (40.95/km^{2})
- Time zone: UTC-6 (Central (CST))
  - Summer (DST): UTC-5 (CDT)
- ZIP code: 57566
- Area code: 605
- FIPS code: 46-48500
- GNIS feature ID: 2393179

Parmelee, also Wósoso (Lakota: "cut meat"), is a census-designated place (CDP) in Todd County, South Dakota, United States, which lies within the Rosebud Indian Reservation. The population was 606 at the 2020 census.

== History ==
Founded in 1916 as Cut Meat, the town was renamed to Parmelee in 1921. The present name honors Dave Parmelee, a pioneer settler.

== Geography ==
According to the United States Census Bureau, the CDP has a total area of 5.8 square miles (15 km^{2}), of which 5.7 square miles (15 km^{2}) is land and 0.1 square miles (0.26 km^{2}) (1.22%) is water.

== Demographics ==
Historical population
Census	Pop.	Note	%±
1990	618		—
2000	650		5.2%
2010	562		−13.5%
2020	606		7.8%
U.S. Decennial Census

As of the census of 2000, there were 650 people, 151 households, and 122 families residing in the CDP. The population density was 114.3 inhabitants per square mile (44.1/km^{2}). There were 160 housing units at an average density of 28.1 per square mile (10.8/km^{2}). The racial makeup of the CDP was 2.31% White, 97.38% Native American, and 0.31% from two or more races. Hispanic or Latino of any race were 0.31% of the population.

There were 151 households, out of which 51.7% had children under the age of 18 living with them, 37.7% were married couples living together, 35.8% had a female householder with no husband present, and 19.2% were non-families. 15.9% of all households were made up of individuals, and 1.3% had someone living alone who was 65 years of age or older. The average household size was 4.30 and the average family size was 4.95.

In the CDP, the population was spread out, with 49.1% under the age of 18, 11.5% from 18 to 24, 22.9% from 25 to 44, 12.8% from 45 to 64, and 3.7% who were 65 years of age or older. The median age was 18 years. For every 100 females, there were 95.8 males. For every 100 females age 18 and over, there were 94.7 males.

The median income for a household in the CDP was $11,063, and the median income for a family was $12,083. Males had a median income of $4,464 versus $15,625 for females. The per capita income for the CDP was $2,946. About 71.4% of families and 77.9% of the population were below the poverty line, including 84.4% of those under age 18 and 51.4% of those age 65 or over.
