= Tribal College Librarians Institute =

Event for librarians from tribal colleges in the USA

TCLI Group Picture 2007

The Tribal College Librarians Institute (TCLI) is a week-long professional development experience for tribal college librarians from all over the United States and Canada, normally held in Bozeman, Montana.

== History ==
The groundwork for TCLI was formed in 1989 when Kathy Kaya, a recently retired Montana State University – Bozeman reference librarian, had a conversation with tribal librarians at Salish Kootenai College about the lack of professional development opportunities for them in Montana. Kathy turned words into action and worked with the Montana State University Libraries and the Montana State University Department of Native American Studies to create TCLI. The first Institute was held in 1990 at Montana State University in Bozeman and was attended by librarians from every tribal college in Montana.

TCLI has grown from a three to a five-day institute and is currently open to all tribal college librarians, tribal college library staff, and any librarians whose mandate it is to serve tribal college students. Funding for TCLI is provided by MSU Libraries and supplemented with grants from private and government institutions. The bulk of the budget is spent on providing travel funds to participants. To date, the institute has been able to offer limited travel funds to all those requesting assistance. While the majority of participants are from the US, librarians from New Zealand and Canada have also attended. In all there have been approximately 200 different participants from 60 institutions and a total of nearly 500 participants overall.

== Subjects of sessions ==
The institute has offered sessions on information literacy, grant writing, collection development, Building Library Policies, digitization, preservation, Web 2.0, government information, database training and a host of other subject areas and topics. In addition to the library related topics, the Institute attempts to include sessions on cultural topics as well. In recent years, there have been sessions on the American Indian Movement, Navajo Code Talkers and Ho-Chunk ethnobotany.

== Venues ==
TCLI is primarily held in Bozeman, Montana; however, funding was received from the National Agricultural Library in 2001 and from the National Museum of the American Indian in 2006 to hold the Institute in Washington, D.C. TCLI 2008 was held June 9–13 in Bozeman on the Montana State University campus. The cultural theme for 2008 focused on native languages and coincided with the United Nations declaration of 2008 as the International Year of Languages.

=== 2007 Institute ===
In 2007, TCLI was attended by 38 participants from 27 institutions, including:

- Blackfeet Community College Library
- College of Menominee Nation Library
- Diné College Libraries
- First Nations University of Canada’s Libraries
- Fort Belknap College Library
- Fort Peck Tribal Library
- Institute of American Indian Arts Library
- Little Priest Tribal College
- Ojibwa Community Library
- LCO Ojibwa College Community Library
- Little Big Horn College Library
- Salish Kootenai College D'Arcy McNickle Library
- Sitting Bull College Library
- Southwestern Indian Polytechnic Institute Library
- Tohono O'odham Community College Library
- Turtle Mountain Community College Library
- United Tribes Technical College Library
- White Earth Tribal and Community College Library
