= Dyani White Hawk =

American contemporary artist (born 1976)

- Born: 1976 (age 49–50); Madison, Wisconsin, U.S.
- Website: dyaniwhitehawk.com

Dyani White Hawk Polk (born 1976) is an American contemporary artist and curator of Sicangu Lakota, German, and Welsh ancestry based out of Minnesota. From 2010 to 2015, White Hawk was a curator for the Minneapolis gallery All My Relations. As an artist, White Hawk's work aesthetic is characterized by a combination of modern abstract painting and traditional Lakota art. White Hawk's pieces reflect both her Western, American upbringing and her indigenous ancestors mediums and modes for creating visual art.

White Hawk's work has been featured in group exhibitions at the Minneapolis College of Art and Design, the Ca' Foscari University in Venice, Italy, the Museum of Contemporary Native Arts in Santa Fe, the Institute of American Indian Arts Museum in Santa Fe, and Minneapolis Institute of Art. Many of White Hawk's works have also been acquisitioned into the collections of the Smithsonian National Museum of the American Indian and the Tweed Museum of Art. In October 2023, she was named one of the MacArthur Fellows to recognize her art "revealing the underrecognized yet enduring influence of Indigenous aesthetics on modern and contemporary art." In April 2024, she received a Guggenheim Fellowship for Fine Arts.

== Early life and education ==
White Hawk was born and raised in Madison, Wisconsin. Her mother, author, speaker, and indigenous rights activist, Sandy White Hawk, was adopted from the Rosebud Indian Reservation in South Dakota to non-Native Wisconsin parents, and as a young child in Wisconsin, the artist had very little connection to her Rosebud family. It was not until she was a teen that she began learning about her Lakota ancestry and grappling with issues of heritage and identity. According to White Hawk "my life experiences have been a continual negotiation of both Western and Indigenous educations, value systems, and worldviews."

White Hawk received her first undergraduate degree in 2003 from Haskell Indian Nations University. In 2008, she earned a BFA in 2-D Studio Arts from the Institute of American Indian Arts (IAIA), and in 2011 she graduated from University of Wisconsin-Madison with an MFA in Studio Arts.

White Hawk credits her mother with encouraging her artistic talent at a young age, but the artist's first painting was completed as part of her IAIA admission portfolio. Her early artwork tends to borrow influence from popular culture and street art. White Hawk cites later influences ranging from abstract modernists such as Mark Rothko and Marsden Hartley, to Native history traditional tribal art forms. Although she tends to favor artistic traditions specific to her Lakota tribe, White Hawk has also found influence in other Native artistic traditions, such as Navajo weaving.

== Work ==
White Hawk is known for her easel-sized paintings that depict abstract compositions emphasizing saturated colors arranged in symmetrical and asymmetrical patterns. She often privileges patterns and lines that replicate quillwork, beadwork, and textiles. In the painting Seeing (2010), for instance, the square canvas is divided into nine smaller squares to create a gridded composition. But the grid yields to deep blue sky peppered with cumulus clouds that appear to recede into the distance; this interruption to the grid is also contained by it, as the sky occupies the central cruciform shape of the composition. Appearing to overlap this firmament are four beige-and-blue striped squares that anchor the painting in each corner.

Primarily through abstraction, White Hawk examines the relationship of traditional art making in Native American communities to more contemporary practices. Often, her work comments on the problematic minimizing of Native artists versus the recognition given to Western artists who take influence from Native art forms. Moccasin toes, ledger drawings, blanket designs, porcupine quills, teepee forms and other Native American motifs often are the subjects of White Hawk's exacting oil paintings.

Though thoroughly modern/contemporary in the expression of her ideas and themes, White Hawk, both as a curator and as an artist, explores her cultural heritage. She writes: "As a woman of Sicangu Lakota and European ancestry, raised among Native communities within urban American environments, my work is an investigation of communal and personal definitions. It is a journey into understanding the history of this land and our relationships with and within it." White Hawk has exhibited work at the Museum of Contemporary Native Arts, and the Indian Arts and Culture Museum. Her work has been collected by the Akta Lakota Museum, the University of Wisconsin-Madison's Wisconsin Union Art Collection, the Robert Penn Collection of Contemporary Northern Plains Indian Art of the University of South Dakota and the Minneapolis Institute of Art.

White Hawk's work has been featured in group exhibitions at the Minneapolis College of Art and Design, the Ca' Foscari University in Venice, Italy, the Museum of Contemporary Native Arts in Santa Fe, and the Institute of American Indian Arts Museum in Santa Fe. White Hawk is currently represented by Shiprock Santa Fe and Bockley Gallery.

White Hawk's painting earned the "Best of Classification" award at the 2011 Santa Fe Indian Art Market and a First Place in painting at the 2011 Northern Plains Indian Art Market. She was a SWAIA discovery fellowship recipient in 2012. In 2013, White Hawk was the recipient of the McKnight Visual Artist Fellowship.

White Hawk is known for her art that represents the Native American culture. White Hawk included several messages in her artwork. "I am your Relative," was created to depict eight Native women sharing their prayer and personal stories related to their Native land." White Hawks art is located in many different museums and she also has participated in cross-cultural residences in at least 4 different countries. White Hawk used "abstraction to bring American Indian tradition into a dynamic contemporary context." This is depicted in her artwork "I am your relative." White Hawk was awarded the Joan Mitchell Foundation Painters & Sculptors Grant in 2014. In 2015 and 2017, the artist was awarded a Native Arts and Cultures Foundation Regional Artist Fellowship. She is also a recipient of the 2018 Nancy Graves Grant for Visual Artists and the 2019 U.S. Fellowship for Visual Art.

White Hawk was commissioned to create Wopila | Lineage (2022), a 14-by-8-foot work composed of a half million glass bugle beads, for the 2022 Whitney Biennial. The piece's title references the Lakota word for deep gratitude. The piece, she states, is "meant to honor and show gratitude for the lineage of Lakota women and their contributions to abstraction, for Indigenous women at large and their contributions to art on this continent, for the generations of practiced abstraction that helped nurture and guide the work of the Western artists that were inspired by their work and brought that back into their studios with them as they created easel paintings. I'm pulling from those histories—from my own very specific history of Lakota abstraction, from Indigenous abstract practices at large, from abstract easel painting practices—and hoping to create opportunities for conversation around how connected those histories are and the fact that one doesn't happen without the other."

Following up on her 2020 work, I Am Your Relative, which looked at stereotypes and violence again Indigenous women and girls, White Hawk created a video series with Razelle Benally, Listen. Listen is a series of videos of Indigenous women speaking their native languages. Lacking any subtitles, the intent of the video series was to raise awareness of the sounds of Indigenous languages.

White Hawk was The Minnesota Star Tribune's artist of the year in 2025. Additionally, White Hawk will debut work at both JFK International Airport in New York and the Portland International Airport.

== Solo exhibitions ==
- 2025 - Love Language, Walker Art Center, Minneapolis, MN
- 2022 - Dyani White Hawk: Speaking to Relatives, Museum of Contemporary Art Denver, Denver, CO
- 2016 - Storied Abstraction, Bockley Gallery, Minneapolis, MN
- 2015 - Dyani White Hawk, Shiprock Santa Fe Gallery, Santa Fe, NM
- 2014 - Into the Light: Paintings and Prints by Dyani White Hawk, Bockley Gallery, Minneapolis, MN
- 2013 - An Exhibition of Works by Dyani White Hawk, Gallery 110, University of South Dakota, Vermillion, SD
- 2012 - Dyani White Hawk, Bockley Gallery, Minneapolis, MN
- 2011 - Inseparable, Art Lofts Gallery, Madison, WI

== Group exhibitions ==
- 2019-2020 - Hearts of Our People: Native Women Artists, traveling exhibition, June 2 - August 18, 2019 at Minneapolis Institute of Art, Minneapolis, MN; September 27, 2019 - January 12, 2020 at Frist Art Museum, Nashville, TN; February 21 - May 17, 2020 at Renwick Gallery, Smithsonian American Art Museum, Washington, D.C.; June 27 - September 13, 2020 at Philbrook Museum of Art, Tulsa, OK.
- 2020 - Indelible Ink: Native Women, Printmaking, Collaboration. University of New Mexico Art Museum.
- 2024 Making Their Mark: Works from the Shah Garg Collection, Berkeley Art Museum and Pacific Film Archive (BAMPFA).
