= Sinte Gleska University =

American Indian tribal college

Coordinates: 43°18′18″N 100°38′30″W

- Motto: Wahope unglawa sakapi hecel oyate ki Wolakota gluha tokatakiya unya pi kte.
- Motto in English: Reenforcing our foundation for the people to go forward in the Lakota Way.
- Type: Public, tribal, land-grant university
- Established: 1970; 56 years ago
- Affiliations: Brulé Lakota
- Academic affiliations: American Indian Higher Education Consortium, Space-grant
- President: Erica Moore
- Students: approximately 1,000
- Location: Mission, South Dakota, United States
- Campus: rural
- Website: sintegleska.edu

Sinte Gleska University (SGU) is a public tribal land-grant university in Mission, South Dakota, on the Rosebud Indian Reservation. It is a Brulé Lakota Indian Reservation home to the Sicangu (Burnt Thigh). SGU has an enrollment of 828 full and part-time students. It is regionally accredited by the Higher Learning Commission.

== History ==
SGU was charted by the Rosebud Sioux Tribe in 1970 and held its first classes on February 3, 1971. SGU was named for the Brulé Lakota chief Sinte Gleska. The founding Board President was Lakota elder Stanley Red Bird Sr., and Joseph M. Marshall III, the first published writer in Lakota, was a founder as well. In 1994, the college was designated a land-grant college alongside 31 other tribal colleges.

== Partnerships ==
The college is a member of the American Indian Higher Education Consortium, a community of tribally and federally chartered institutions working to strengthen tribal nations. Tribal colleges generally serve geographically isolated populations who have no other means accessing higher education; they also are a means for the tribes to teach subjects from the perspectives of their cultures, as well as specific classes in their cultures.

== Academics ==
Undergraduate demographics as of Fall 2023
Race and ethnicity	Total
American Indian/Alaska Native	93%
White	7%
Economic diversity
Low-income (Note: The percentage of students who received an income-based federal Pell grant intended for low-income students.)	52%
Affluent (Note: The percentage of students who are a part of the American middle class at the bare minimum.)	48%

SGU describes its approach to higher education as focusing on "an educational direction and philosophy that both promotes and preserves our Lakol Wicohan (traditional way of life) for the benefit of our future generations."

The university offers associate degrees, bachelor's degrees, master's degrees, certificates, and vocational programs through seven academic undergraduate departments:

- Great Plains Art Institute
- Arts and Sciences
- Business
- Education
- Human Services
- Lakota Studies
- Institute of Technologies (vocational/career education)

The college has programs in Lakota studies, including the language and aesthetics.

The Great Plains Art Institute of the University offers AA and BA degrees in art and a BAAE degree in art education.

In 1988, SGU established the annual Northern Plains Indian Art Market in Sioux Falls, South Dakota, which included a juried art show, art market, powwow, and Oscar Howe lecture. The market aimed to educate students and the community about Northern Plains art, philosophy, dance, and music. In 2023, SGU canceled the market, citing financial issues and decreasing participation from students.

SGU has partnered with Red Crow Community College and Old Sun Community College, both in Alberta, Canada, enabling them to offer a master's degree in education, with an emphasis in early childhood special education.

== Notable faculty ==
- LeAnne Howe (Choctaw Nation of Oklahoma)
- Joe L. Kincheloe (1950–2008)
- Simon J. Ortiz (Acoma Pueblo)
- Albert White Hat (1929–2013)
- Doris Leader Charge (1930–2001)

== See also ==
- American Indian College Fund (AICF)
