= Spring Creek, South Dakota =

- Census-designated place
- Location in Todd County and the state of South Dakota
- Coordinates: 43°07′43″N 101°00′40″W
- Country: United States
- State: South Dakota
- Counties: Todd

Area
  - Total: 9.3 sq mi (24.1 km^{2})
  - Land: 9.3 sq mi (24.1 km^{2})
  - Water: 0 sq mi (0 km^{2})
- Elevation: 2,667 ft (813 m)

Population (2020)
  - Total: 236
  - Density: 29/sq mi (11.1/km^{2})
- Time zone: UTC-6 (Central (CST))
  - Summer (DST): UTC-5 (CDT)
- GNIS feature ID: 2393246

Spring Creek is a census-designated place (CDP) in Todd County, South Dakota, United States. The population was 236 at the 2020 census.

== Geography ==
According to the United States Census Bureau, the CDP has a total area of 9.3 square miles (24.1 km^{2}), all land.

== Demographics ==
As of the census of 2000, there were 136 people, 29 households, and 26 families residing in the CDP. The population density was 14.6 people per square mile (5.6/km^{2}). There were 33 housing units at an average density of 3.5/sq mi (1.4/km^{2}). The racial makeup of the CDP was 0.00% White and 100.00% Native American.

There were 29 households, out of which 37.9% had children under the age of 18 living with them, 27.6% were married couples living together, 51.7% had a female householder with no husband present, and 10.3% were non-families. 6.9% of all households were made up of individuals, and none had someone living alone who was 65 years of age or older. The average household size was 4.69 and the average family size was 4.92.

In the CDP, the population was spread out, with 43.4% under the age of 18, 14.7% from 18 to 24, 22.1% from 25 to 44, 14.0% from 45 to 64, and 5.9% who were 65 years of age or older. The median age was 21 years. For every 100 females, there were 97.1 males. For every 100 females age 18 and over, there were 87.8 males.

The median income for a household in the CDP was $28,194, and the median income for a family was $28,194. Males had a median income of $0 versus $21,250 for females. The per capita income for the CDP was $4,045. There were 30.8% of families and 44.8% of the population living below the poverty line, including none under 18 and none of those over 64.

== Education ==
The CDP is served by Todd County School District 66-1.
