= Antelope, South Dakota =

- Census-designated place
- Location in Todd County and the state of South Dakota
- Coordinates: 43°18′30″N 100°37′35″W
- Country: United States
- State: South Dakota
- Counties: Todd

Area
  - Total: 2.3 sq mi (5.9 km^{2})
  - Land: 2.3 sq mi (5.9 km^{2})
  - Water: 0 sq mi (0 km^{2})
- Elevation: 2,602 ft (793 m)

Population (2020)
  - Total: 830
  - Density: 360/sq mi (140/km^{2})
- Time zone: UTC-6 (Central (CST))
  - Summer (DST): UTC-5 (CDT)
- GNIS feature ID: 2393317

Antelope is a census-designated place (CDP) in Todd County, South Dakota, United States. The population was 830 at the 2020 census.

== Geography ==
According to the United States Census Bureau, the CDP has a total area of 2.3 square miles (6.0 km^{2}), of which 2.3 square miles (6.0 km^{2}) is land and 0.44% is water.

== Demographics ==
Historical population
Census	Pop.	Note	%±
1990	744		—
2000	867		16.5%
2010	826		−4.7%
2020	830		0.5%
U.S. Decennial Census

As of the census of 2000, there were 867 people, 225 households, and 177 families residing in the CDP. The population density was 379.7 inhabitants per square mile (146.6/km^{2}). There were 233 housing units at an average density of 102.0 per square mile (39.4/km^{2}). The racial makeup of the CDP was 2.19% White, 96.89% Native American, and 0.92% from two or more races. Hispanic or Latino of any race were 2.65% of the population.

There were 225 households, out of which 52.9% had children under the age of 18 living with them, 25.3% were married couples living together, 42.2% had a female householder with no husband present, and 21.3% were non-families. 16.9% of all households were made up of individuals, and 8.9% had someone living alone who was 65 years of age or older. The average household size was 3.80 and the average family size was 4.24.

In the CDP, the population was spread out, with 47.8% under the age of 18, 10.3% from 18 to 24, 23.3% from 25 to 44, 11.5% from 45 to 64, and 7.2% who were 65 years of age or older. The median age was 19 years. For every 100 females, there were 91.0 males. For every 100 females age 18 and over, there were 84.1 males.

The median income for a household in the CDP was $8,125, and the median income for a family was $11,923. Males had a median income of $15,167 versus $17,273 for females. The per capita income for the CDP was $4,105. About 62.4% of families and 65.9% of the population were below the poverty line, including 72.1% of those under age 18 and 63.4% of those age 65 or over.
