= Todd County, South Dakota =

County in South Dakota, United States

- County
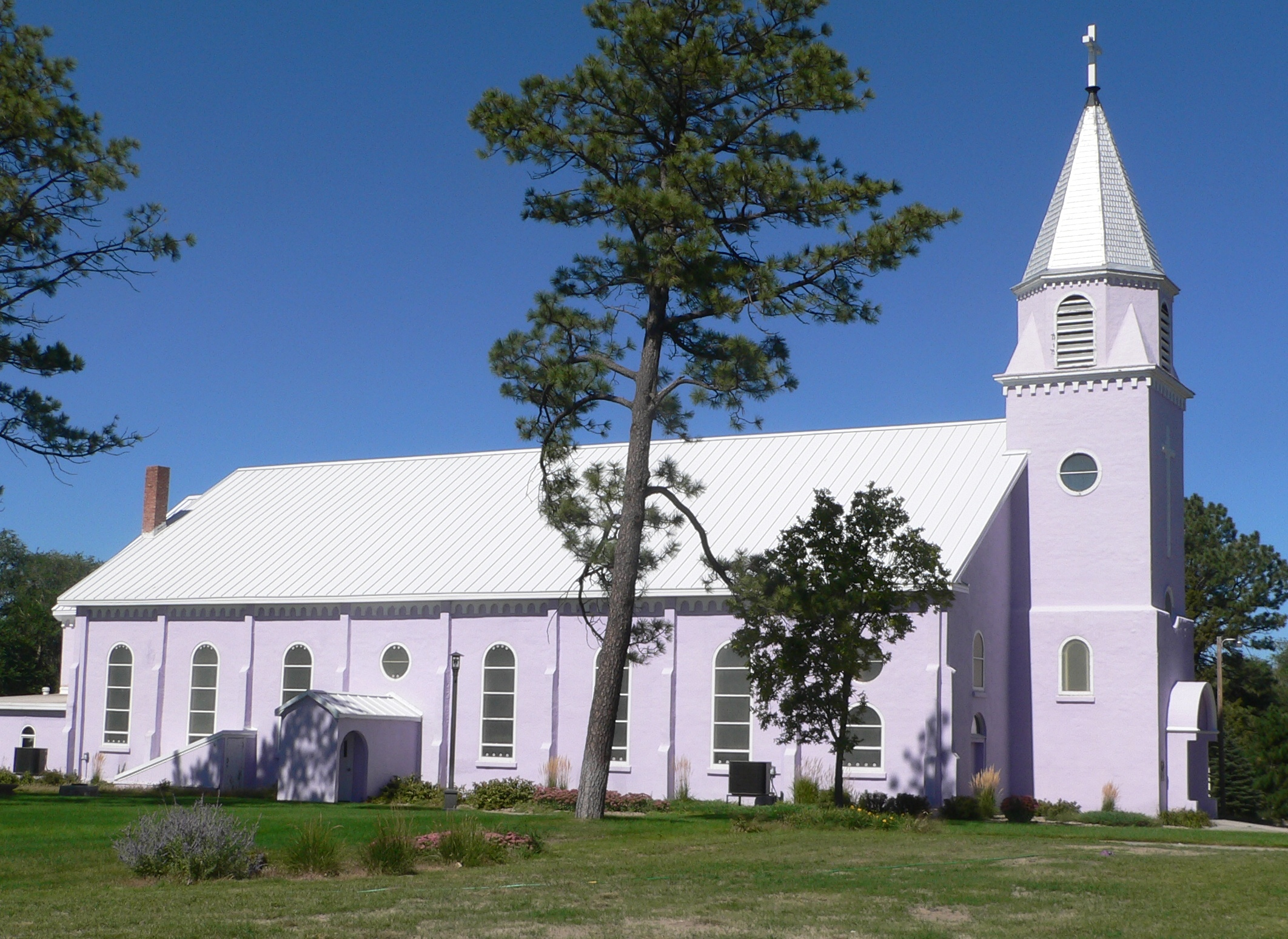
- St. Charles Borromeo church in St. Francis, South Dakota at the Rosebud Indian Reservation

- Location within the U.S. state of South Dakota
- Coordinates: 43°11′N 100°44′W
- Country: United States
- State: South Dakota
- Founded: 1909
- Named for: John Blair Smith Todd
- Seat: None (de jure); Winner (de facto)
- Largest city: Mission

Area
  - Total: 1,391 sq mi (3,600 km^{2})
  - Land: 1,389 sq mi (3,600 km^{2})
  - Water: 2.3 sq mi (6.0 km^{2}) 0.2%

Population (2020)
  - Total: 9,319
  - Estimate (2025): 8,863 ▼
  - Density: 6.709/sq mi (2.590/km^{2})
- Time zone: UTC−6 (Central)
  - Summer (DST): UTC−5 (CDT)
- Congressional district: At-large
- Winner in neighboring Tripp County serves as Todd County's administrative center.

Todd County is a county in the U.S. state of South Dakota. As of the 2020 census, the population was 9,319. Todd County does not have its own county seat. Instead, Winner in neighboring Tripp County serves as its administrative center. Its largest city is Mission. The county was created in 1909, although it remains unorganized. The county was named for John Blair Smith Todd, a delegate from Dakota Territory to the United States House of Representatives and a Civil War general.

The county lies entirely within the Rosebud Indian Reservation and is coterminous with the main reservation (exclusive of off-reservation trust lands, which lie in four nearby counties). Its southern border is with the state of Nebraska. It is one of five South Dakota counties entirely within an Indian reservation. The county's per-capita income makes it the third poorest county in the United States. Unlike many rural counties in South Dakota, since 1960, its net population has increased.

== History ==
Until 1981 Todd, Shannon (now Oglala Lakota), and Washabaugh were the last unorganized counties in the United States. Although then organized, Todd did not receive a home rule charter until 1983. It contracts with Tripp County for its Auditor, Treasurer, and Registrar of Deeds.

== Geography ==
Todd County lies on the south line of South Dakota. Its south boundary line abuts the north boundary line of the state of Nebraska. Its terrain consists of semi-arid rolling hills, cut by gullies and drainages which flow to the northeast. The land is partially dedicated to agriculture, including center pivot irrigation. The terrain slopes to the northeast, and its highest point is near the SW corner, at 3,176 ft (968 m) ASL.

The eastern portion of South Dakota's counties (48 of 66) observe Central Time; the western counties (18 of 66) observe Mountain Time. Todd County is the westernmost of the SD counties to observe Central Time.

Todd County has a total area of 1,391 square miles (3,600 km^{2}), of which 1,389 square miles (3,600 km^{2}) is land and 2.3 square miles (6.0 km^{2}) (0.2%) is water.

=== Major highways ===
- U.S. Highway 18
- U.S. Highway 83
- South Dakota Highway 63

=== Adjacent counties ===
- Mellette County – north
- Tripp County – east
- Cherry County, Nebraska – south (western half observes Mountain Time)
- Keya Paha County, Nebraska – southeast
- Bennett County – west (observes Mountain Time)
- Jackson County – northwest (observes Mountain Time)

=== Protected areas ===
- Hollow Horn Bear Village

=== Lakes ===
- Antelope Lake
- He Dog Lake
- White Lake

== Demographics ==
Historical population
Census	Pop.	Note	%±
1910	2,164		—
1920	2,784		28.7%
1930	5,898		111.9%
1940	5,714		−3.1%
1950	4,758		−16.7%
1960	4,661		−2.0%
1970	6,606		41.7%
1980	7,328		10.9%
1990	8,352		14.0%
2000	9,050		8.4%
2010	9,612		6.2%
2020	9,319		−3.0%
2025 (est.)	8,863	▼	−4.9%
U.S. Decennial Census; 1790–1960 1900–1990; 1990–2000 2010–2020

=== 2020 census ===
Todd County, South Dakota – Racial composition Note: the US Census treats Hispanic/Latino as an ethnic category. This table excludes Latinos from the racial categories and assigns them to a separate category. Hispanics/Latinos may be of any race.
Race (NH = Non-Hispanic)	% 2020	% 2010	% 2000	Pop 2020	Pop 2010	Pop 2000
White alone (NH)	7.4%	9.5%	12.5%	685	913	1,127
Black alone (NH)	0.1%	0.2%	0.1%	10	16	8
American Indian alone (NH)	87.2%	86.3%	84.4%	8,122	8,297	7,642
Asian alone (NH)	0.5%	0.2%	0.1%	45	18	13
Pacific Islander alone (NH)	0%	0%	0%	0	0	0
Other race alone (NH)	0%	0%	0%	0	1	4
Multiracial (NH)	2.5%	1.5%	1.3%	235	140	118
Hispanic/Latino (any race)	2.4%	2.4%	1.5%	222	227	138

The most reported detailed ancestries in 2020 were Rosebud Sioux Tribe (75.1%), Sioux (4.8%), German (3.3%), Mexican (1.7%), Irish (1.7%), Oglala Sioux Tribe (1.2%), and English (1.1%).

As of the 2020 census, there were 9,319 people, 2,570 households, and 1,889 families residing in the county. The population density was 6.7 inhabitants per square mile (2.6/km^{2}).

Of the residents, 39.7% were under the age of 18 and 8.3% were 65 years of age or older; the median age was 25.1 years. For every 100 females there were 94.1 males, and for every 100 females age 18 and over there were 89.4 males.

The racial makeup of the county was 7.6% White, 0.1% Black or African American, 88.7% American Indian and Alaska Native, 0.5% Asian, 0.2% from some other race, and 2.9% from two or more races. Hispanic or Latino residents of any race comprised 2.4% of the population.

There were 2,570 households in the county, of which 53.7% had children under the age of 18 living with them and 39.4% had a female householder with no spouse or partner present. About 22.0% of all households were made up of individuals and 6.9% had someone living alone who was 65 years of age or older.

There were 2,875 housing units, of which 10.6% were vacant. Among occupied housing units, 49.5% were owner-occupied and 50.5% were renter-occupied. The homeowner vacancy rate was 0.2% and the rental vacancy rate was 6.8%.

=== 2010 census ===
As of the 2010 census, there were 9,612 people, 2,780 households, and 2,091 families in the county. The population density was 6.9 inhabitants per square mile (2.7/km^{2}). There were 3,142 housing units at an average density of 2.3 units per square mile (0.89 units/km^{2}). The racial makeup of the county was 88.1% American Indian, 9.6% white, 0.2% black or African American, 0.2% Asian, 0.2% from other races, and 1.8% from two or more races. Those of Hispanic or Latino origin made up 2.4% of the population. In terms of ancestry, 5.1% were German, and 1.1% were American.

Of the 2,780 households, 55.9% had children under the age of 18 living with them, 28.5% were married couples living together, 34.7% had a female householder with no husband present, 24.8% were non-families, and 21.1% of all households were made up of individuals. The average household size was 3.45 and the average family size was 3.95. The median age was 24.0 years.

The median income for a household in the county was $25,196 and the median income for a family was $29,010. Males had a median income of $26,971 versus $30,211 for females. The per capita income for the county was $11,010. About 44.2% of families and 48.8% of the population were below the poverty line, including 59.0% of those under age 18 and 45.7% of those age 65 or over.

== Communities ==
=== City ===
- Mission

=== Town ===
- St. Francis

=== Census-designated places ===
- Antelope
- Okreek
- Parmelee
- Rosebud
- Sicangu Village
- Soldier Creek
- Spring Creek
- Two Strike
- White Horse

=== Other unincorporated communities ===
- Grass Mountain
- He Dog
- Hidden Timber
- Olsonville

=== Unorganized territories ===
- East Todd
- West Todd

== Politics ==
Todd County heavily leans Democratic in politics. Similar to most other Native American-majority counties, Hillary Clinton won the majority of votes in Todd County in 2016. In 2020, Joe Biden received a larger majority of the county vote. The last election in which the Republican nominee won the county was in 1960 which the Richard Nixon-Henry Cabot Lodge Jr. ticket carried the county.

United States presidential election results for Todd County, South Dakota
Year	Republican		Democratic		Third party(ies)	
Year	No.	%	No.	%	No.	%
1924	837	67.01%	237	18.98%	175	14.01%
1928	789	48.43%	831	51.01%	9	0.55%
1932	533	26.20%	1,485	73.01%	16	0.79%
1936	624	31.74%	1,318	67.04%	24	1.22%
1940	1,245	50.14%	1,238	49.86%	0	0.00%
1944	737	51.90%	683	48.10%	0	0.00%
1948	625	43.46%	796	55.35%	17	1.18%
1952	1,025	62.65%	611	37.35%	0	0.00%
1956	748	47.31%	833	52.69%	0	0.00%
1960	909	50.14%	904	49.86%	0	0.00%
1964	723	36.20%	1,274	63.80%	0	0.00%
1968	683	38.78%	987	56.05%	91	5.17%
1972	806	46.78%	907	52.64%	10	0.58%
1976	583	40.66%	826	57.60%	25	1.74%
1980	803	41.76%	972	50.55%	148	7.70%
1984	679	39.61%	1,022	59.63%	13	0.76%
1988	535	31.92%	1,117	66.65%	24	1.43%
1992	456	27.98%	915	56.13%	259	15.89%
1996	482	24.21%	1,380	69.31%	129	6.48%
2000	478	31.99%	993	66.47%	23	1.54%
2004	889	25.23%	2,543	72.16%	92	2.61%
2008	571	20.19%	2,208	78.08%	49	1.73%
2012	498	19.94%	1,976	79.13%	23	0.92%
2016	487	22.92%	1,505	70.82%	133	6.26%
2020	532	20.95%	1,963	77.31%	44	1.73%
2024	497	23.38%	1,570	73.85%	59	2.78%

== See also ==
- National Register of Historic Places listings in Todd County, South Dakota
