= Two Strike, South Dakota =

- Census-designated place
- Location in Todd County and the state of South Dakota
- Coordinates: 43°12′34″N 100°53′52″W
- Country: United States
- State: South Dakota
- County: Todd

Area
  - Total: 18.57 sq mi (48.09 km^{2})
  - Land: 18.53 sq mi (48.00 km^{2})
  - Water: 0.035 sq mi (0.09 km^{2})
- Elevation: 2,884 ft (879 m)

Population (2020)
  - Total: 282
  - Density: 15.2/sq mi (5.87/km^{2})
- Time zone: UTC-6 (Central (CST))
  - Summer (DST): UTC-5 (CDT)
- Area code: 605
- FIPS code: 46-64840

Two Strike is a census-designated place (CDP) in Todd County, South Dakota, United States, named after Brulé, Lakota chief Two Strike who lived at that location for a period of time. The population was 282 at the 2020 census.

== Geography ==
According to the United States Census Bureau, the CDP has a total area of 3.8 square miles (9.9 km^{2}), of which 3.8 square miles (9.9 km^{2}) is land and 0.26% is water.

== Demographics ==
Historical population
Census	Pop.	Note	%±
2020	282		—
U.S. Decennial Census

As of the census of 2000, there were 33 people, 9 households, and 7 families residing in the CDP. The population density was 8.7 people per square mile (3.3/km^{2}). There were 11 housing units at an average density of 2.9/sq mi (1.1/km^{2}). The racial makeup of the CDP was 3.03% White and 96.97% Native American.

There were 9 households, out of which 44.4% had children under the age of 18 living with them, 11.1% were married couples living together, 22.2% had a female householder with no husband present, and 22.2% were non-families. 22.2% of all households were made up of individuals, and 11.1% had someone living alone who was 65 years of age or older. The average household size was 3.67 and the average family size was 3.86.

In the CDP, the population was spread out, with 45.5% under the age of 18, 12.1% from 18 to 24, 18.2% from 25 to 44, 18.2% from 45 to 64, and 6.1% who were 65 years of age or older. The median age was 20 years. For every 100 females, there were 106.3 males. For every 100 females age 18 and over, there were 100.0 males.

The median income for a household in the CDP was $56,250, and the median income for a family was $23,750. Males had a median income of $23,333 versus $17,500 for females. The per capita income for the CDP was $7,815. There were no families and 10.3% of the population living below the poverty line, including none under 18 and none of those over 64.

== Education ==
The CDP is served by Todd County School District 66-1.
