= St. Francis, South Dakota =

St. Francis, South Dakota Sápauŋ Thí
- City
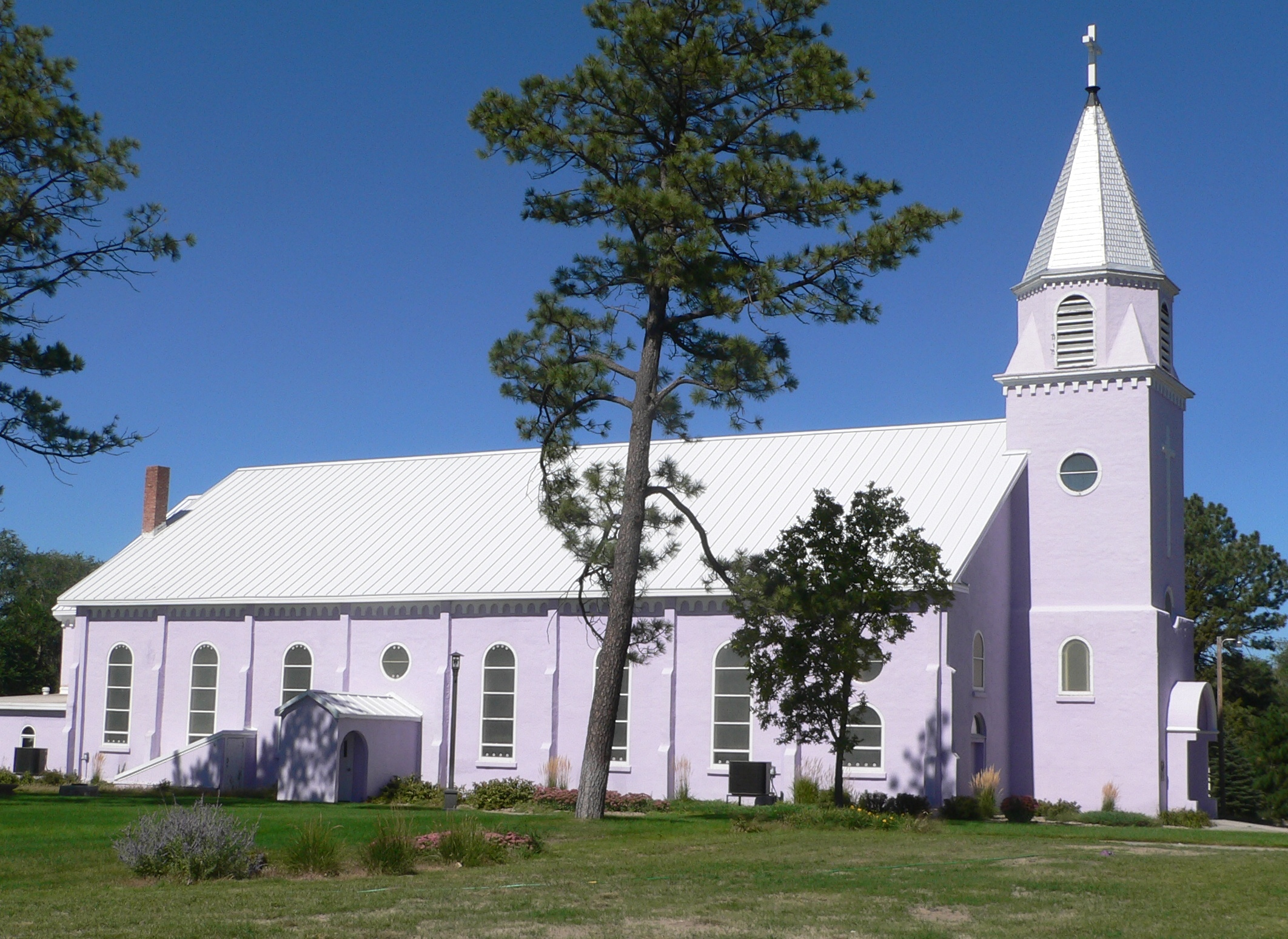
- St. Charles Borromeo Catholic Church in St. Francis

- Location in Todd County and the state of South Dakota
- Coordinates: 43°08′33″N 100°54′10″W
- Country: United States
- State: South Dakota
- County: Todd

Area
  - Total: 0.36 sq mi (0.94 km^{2})
  - Land: 0.36 sq mi (0.94 km^{2})
  - Water: 0 sq mi (0.00 km^{2})
- Elevation: 3,002 ft (915 m)

Population (2020)
  - Total: 469
  - Density: 1,295.2/sq mi (500.08/km^{2})
- Time zone: UTC-6 (Central (CST))
  - Summer (DST): UTC-5 (CDT)
- Area code: 605
- FIPS code: 46-57140
- GNIS feature ID: 1267558

St. Francis or Saint Francis, also known as Sápauŋ Thí (Lakota: Sápauŋ Thí; "Catholic House") is a city in the Rosebud Indian Reservation in Todd County, South Dakota, United States. The population was 469 at the 2020 census.

St. Francis is named after the St. Francis Indian School, which was named after Francis of Assisi and was operated by the Catholic Franciscan order.

== Geography ==
According to the United States Census Bureau, the town has a total area of 0.36 square miles (0.93 km^{2}), all land.

== Demographics ==
Historical population
Census	Pop.	Note	%±
1940	273		—
1950	241		−11.7%
1960	421		74.7%
1970	300		−28.7%
1980	766		155.3%
1990	815		6.4%
2000	675		−17.2%
2010	709		5.0%
2020	469		−33.9%
U.S. Decennial Census

=== 2010 census ===
As of the census of 2010, there were 709 people, 189 households, and 139 families living in the town. The population density was 1,969.4 inhabitants per square mile (760.4/km^{2}). There were 211 housing units at an average density of 586.1 per square mile (226.3/km^{2}). The racial makeup of the town was 5.1% White, 0.4% African American, 93.8% Native American, and 0.7% from two or more races. Hispanic or Latino of any race were 1.8% of the population.

There were 189 households, of which 56.6% had children under the age of 18 living with them, 17.5% were married couples living together, 40.7% had a female householder with no husband present, 15.3% had a male householder with no wife present, and 26.5% were non-families. 19.0% of all households were made up of individuals, and 2.6% had someone living alone who was 65 years of age or older. The average household size was 3.75 and the average family size was 4.27.

The median age in the town was 24.1 years. 38.8% of residents were under the age of 18; 13.2% were between the ages of 18 and 24; 24.6% were from 25 to 44; 18.8% were from 45 to 64; and 4.5% were 65 years of age or older. The gender makeup of the town was 51.8% male and 48.2% female.

=== 2000 census ===
As of the census of 2000, there were 675 people, 183 households, and 131 families living in the town. The population density was 1,860.9 inhabitants per square mile (718.5/km^{2}). There were 204 housing units at an average density of 562.4 per square mile (217.1/km^{2}). The racial makeup of the town was 3.26% White, 96.15% Native American, 0.15% Asian, 0.30% from other races, and 0.15% from two or more races. Hispanic or Latino of any race were 1.78% of the population.

There were 183 households, out of which 47.5% had children under the age of 18 living with them, 19.1% were married couples living together, 34.4% had a female householder with no husband present, and 27.9% were non-families. 21.3% of all households were made up of individuals, and 9.3% had someone living alone who was 65 years of age or older. The average household size was 3.50 and the average family size was 4.12.

In the town, the population was spread out, with 42.4% under the age of 18, 9.9% from 18 to 24, 24.9% from 25 to 44, 14.4% from 45 to 64, and 8.4% who were 65 years of age or older. The median age was 23 years. For every 100 females, there were 97.4 males. For every 100 females age 18 and over, there were 99.5 males.

The median income for a household in the town was $18,750, and the median income for a family was $20,000. Males had a median income of $18,333 versus $18,750 for females. The per capita income for the town was $7,026. About 48.6% of families and 57.1% of the population were below the poverty line, including 69.8% of those under age 18 and 35.8% of those age 65 or over.

== Politics ==
Saint Francis has a representative from its district on the Rosebud Tribal Council. Scott Herman is the current Tribal Council President (2021).

== Education ==
St. Francis Indian School is in St. Francis. Students also have the option of attending schools run by Todd County School District 66-1.
