= American Indian College Fund =

Non-profit organization in the US

- Founded: 1989
- Type: Non-governmental organization
- Purpose: Education
- Headquarters: Denver
- Region served: United States
- President and CEO: Cheryl Crazy Bull
- Website: collegefund.org

The American Indian College Fund is a nonprofit organization that helps Native American students, providing them with support through scholarships and funding toward higher education. The fund provides an average of 6,000 annual scholarships for American Indian students and also provides support for other needs at tribal colleges ranging from capital support to cultural preservation activities. Charity Navigator gave the College Fund an overall rating of 88.36 out of 100.

== Information ==
The American Indian College Fund (the College Fund) was established in 1989 as a non-profit 501(c)(3) organization to provide American Indians with student scholarships. The College Fund also helps support tribal colleges and universities (TCUs) located on or near Indian reservations through capital grants and programs such as cultural and language preservation, early childhood education programs on-campus for children of students and community members; fellowships for faculty development; and college readiness, internship, career readiness, and leadership development programs.

Today American Indians account for only 1% of all college students, and 13.6% of American Indians over age 25 years old have a bachelor's degree compared to 29.3% of the overall population. Poverty is part of the reason so few American Indians and Alaska Natives go to college, with current data showing that 28.3% of the American Indian and Alaska Natives living below the poverty level compared to 15.5% of the overall population.

== History and mission ==
During the Civil Rights Acts and Native American self-determination movements in the 1960s and 1970s, tribal leaders decided there was a need for change in what they described as failed federal education policy to improve education for American Indian students to serve their communities, leading to the creation of tribal colleges and universities (TCUs).

In 1968, the Navajo Nation created the first-of-its-kind educational institution—a college controlled by the tribe, located on the Navajo reservation, to provide a quality higher education to the surrounding community, known as a tribal college and university. TCU presidents established the College Fund in 1989 in New York City to raise private-sector funds for scholarships for American Indian students and to raise money for financial support for the tribal colleges, while broadening awareness of those institutions and the College Fund itself.

In 2015-16, the College Fund distributed more than $8.1 million in direct support to students, including scholarships, internships, leadership training, career readiness, and other programmatic support. Scholarship recipients are selected on the basis of academic success, financial need, community involvement, and commitment to their tribal communities. To date the College Fund has provided more than 100,000 scholarships since its inception and an average of 6,000 scholarships per year to American Indian students. The College Fund also helps support accredited tribal colleges with research and leadership grants, cultural preservation programs, early childhood education programs, and faculty development fellowships as well as with institutional funding.

The American Indian College Fund has received top ratings from independent charity evaluators. It earned the Best in America Seal of Excellence from America's Best Charities. The College Fund meets the Standards for Charity Accountability of the Better Business Bureau's Wise Giving Alliance. The College Fund received a B+ rating from CharityWatch. The College Fund received a gold rating from GuideStar in 2017, a four-star rating from Charity Navigator for fiscal year 2016, and a three star rating for 2018.

Originally headquartered in New York City, the College Fund relocated to Denver, Colorado, in 2002.

== Tribal colleges ==
According to supporters, tribal colleges and universities (TCUs) are vital to Native Americans and are beneficial to the country as a whole. They help Native communities and students gain a valuable education and also preserve Native language, culture and traditions through language curriculum and American Indian studies.

Since the first tribal college was established in 1968, the number of tribal colleges and universities has grown to 37 in the United States in 2016.

According to the American Indian Higher Education Consortium, TCUs are chartered by their respective tribal governments, including the ten tribes within the largest reservations in the United States. They operate more than 75 campuses in 16 states—virtually covering Indian Country—and serve students from well more than 230 federally recognized Indian tribes. TCUs vary in enrollment (size), focus (liberal arts, sciences, workforce development/training), location (woodlands, desert, frozen tundra, rural reservation, urban), and student population (predominantly American Indian). Despite their diversity, tribal identity is the core of every TCU, and they all share the mission of tribal self-determination and service to their respective communities.

TCUs engage in partnerships with organizations including U.S. Department of the Interior, U.S. Department of Agriculture, U.S. Department of Housing and Urban Development, the National Science Foundation, National Aeronautics and Space Administration, and universities nationwide to support research and education programs that focus on issues such as climate change, sustainable agriculture, water quality, wildlife population dynamics, and diabetes prevention. Many support distance learning involving state-of-the-art learning environments.

== See also ==
- Jan Crull Jr.
