= Child Abuse & Neglect =

- Subject: Child abuse, child neglect
- Language: English
- Edited by: Christine Wekerle

Publication details
- History: 1977–present
- Publisher: Elsevier (South Africa)
- Frequency: Monthly
- Impact factor: 2.899 (2017)

Standard abbreviations
- ISO 4: Child Abuse Negl.

Indexing
- CODEN: CABND3
- ISSN: 0145-2134 (print); 1873-7757 (web)
- LCCN: 81642299
- OCLC no.: 03475531

Links
- Journal homepage; Online archive

Child Abuse & Neglect is a monthly peer-reviewed interdisciplinary social science journal covering child protection. It was established in 1977 and is the official journal of the International Society for Prevention of Child Abuse and Neglect. It is published by Elsevier and the editor-in-chief is Christine Wekerle (McMaster University). According to the Journal Citation Reports, the journal has a 2017 impact factor of 2.899.
