= Mission, South Dakota =

- City
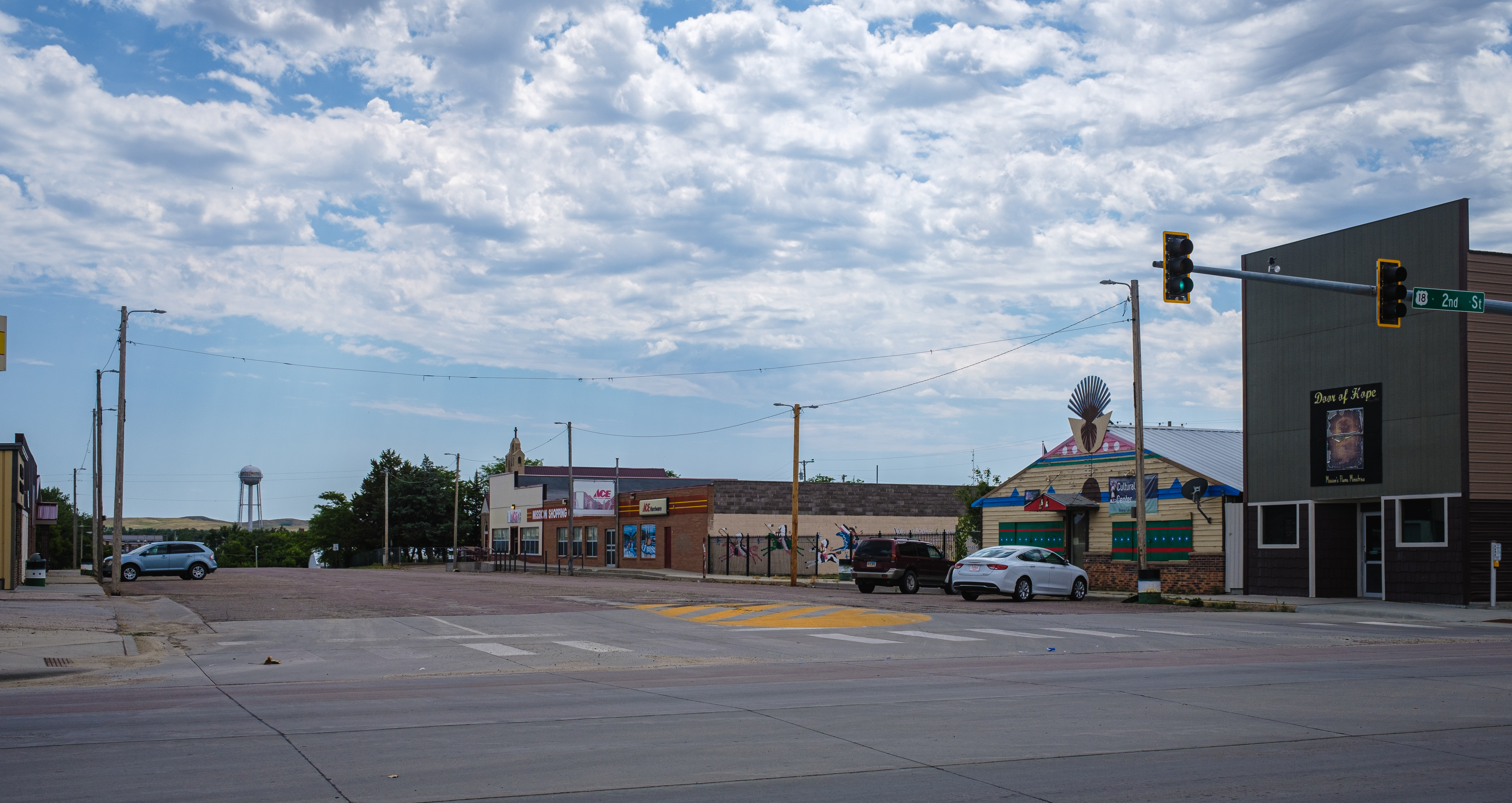
- Downtown Mission, South Dakota

- Location in Todd County and the state of South Dakota
- Coordinates: 43°18′23″N 100°39′39″W
- Country: United States
- State: South Dakota
- County: Todd
- Founded: 1915

Area
  - Total: 0.59 sq mi (1.52 km^{2})
  - Land: 0.59 sq mi (1.52 km^{2})
  - Water: 0 sq mi (0.00 km^{2})
- Elevation: 2,579 ft (786 m)

Population (2020)
  - Total: 1,156
  - Density: 1,969.5/sq mi (760.42/km^{2})
- Time zone: UTC-6 (Central (CST))
  - Summer (DST): UTC-5 (CDT)
- ZIP code: 57555
- Area code: 605
- FIPS code: 46-42940
- GNIS feature ID: 1267478
- Website: missionsd.gov

Mission is a city on the Rosebud Indian Reservation in northern Todd County, South Dakota, United States. The population was 1,156 at the 2020 census.

Mission is home of the Sinte Gleska University. It is the largest incorporated community in the county, but is smaller than the unincorporated community of Rosebud, the capital of the Rosebud Sioux Tribe.

Mission is named for one of the many missions established by religious groups in the late 19th century to educate and assist the Sicangu Lakota (Rosebud Sioux) and other Native American people. The major economic center of the county, it is located at the junction of U.S. routes 18 and 83. The city contains part of the Oyate Trail, the headquarters of the Todd County School District, Cherry-Todd Rural Electric Cooperative, and various federal/tribal agencies.

== Geography ==
According to the United States Census Bureau, the city has a total area of 0.59 square miles (1.53 km^{2}), all land.

=== Climate ===
According to the Köppen Climate Classification system, Mission has a hot-summer humid continental climate, abbreviated "Dfa" on climate maps. The hottest temperature recorded in Mission was 114 °F (45.6 °C) on July 24, 2007, while the coldest temperature recorded was −31 °F (−35.0 °C) on December 22, 1990.

Climate data for Mission, South Dakota (Mission 14 S), 1991–2020 normals, extremes 1951–present
Month	Jan	Feb	Mar	Apr	May	Jun	Jul	Aug	Sep	Oct	Nov	Dec	Year
Record high °F (°C)	71 (22)	75 (24)	86 (30)	95 (35)	98 (37)	109 (43)	114 (46)	108 (42)	104 (40)	95 (35)	85 (29)	74 (23)	114 (46)
Mean maximum °F (°C)	57.4 (14.1)	61.6 (16.4)	74.9 (23.8)	82.8 (28.2)	89.3 (31.8)	94.4 (34.7)	101.0 (38.3)	99.0 (37.2)	96.0 (35.6)	86.0 (30.0)	73.9 (23.3)	58.5 (14.7)	102.6 (39.2)
Mean daily maximum °F (°C)	33.1 (0.6)	36.6 (2.6)	47.3 (8.5)	57.0 (13.9)	67.8 (19.9)	78.9 (26.1)	87.0 (30.6)	85.7 (29.8)	77.0 (25.0)	61.4 (16.3)	46.8 (8.2)	35.3 (1.8)	59.5 (15.3)
Daily mean °F (°C)	22.1 (−5.5)	25.0 (−3.9)	34.6 (1.4)	44.0 (6.7)	55.1 (12.8)	66.1 (18.9)	73.1 (22.8)	71.4 (21.9)	62.3 (16.8)	47.8 (8.8)	34.7 (1.5)	24.6 (−4.1)	46.7 (8.2)
Mean daily minimum °F (°C)	11.1 (−11.6)	13.4 (−10.3)	22.0 (−5.6)	30.9 (−0.6)	42.4 (5.8)	53.3 (11.8)	59.2 (15.1)	57.0 (13.9)	47.5 (8.6)	34.3 (1.3)	22.6 (−5.2)	13.8 (−10.1)	34.0 (1.1)
Mean minimum °F (°C)	−11.6 (−24.2)	−8.0 (−22.2)	1.6 (−16.9)	15.8 (−9.0)	28.0 (−2.2)	41.8 (5.4)	49.2 (9.6)	46.5 (8.1)	33.0 (0.6)	16.8 (−8.4)	3.3 (−15.9)	−7.3 (−21.8)	−17.1 (−27.3)
Record low °F (°C)	−28 (−33)	−30 (−34)	−26 (−32)	3 (−16)	19 (−7)	31 (−1)	39 (4)	37 (3)	20 (−7)	0 (−18)	−21 (−29)	−31 (−35)	−31 (−35)
Average precipitation inches (mm)	0.40 (10)	0.66 (17)	1.08 (27)	2.68 (68)	3.65 (93)	3.94 (100)	3.10 (79)	2.18 (55)	1.82 (46)	1.63 (41)	0.74 (19)	0.62 (16)	22.50 (572)
Average snowfall inches (cm)	5.3 (13)	6.8 (17)	6.9 (18)	7.4 (19)	0.1 (0.25)	0.0 (0.0)	0.0 (0.0)	0.0 (0.0)	0.0 (0.0)	2.1 (5.3)	5.1 (13)	7.1 (18)	40.8 (103.55)
Average extreme snow depth inches (cm)	4.7 (12)	4.7 (12)	5.3 (13)	4.6 (12)	0.0 (0.0)	0.0 (0.0)	0.0 (0.0)	0.0 (0.0)	0.0 (0.0)	1.4 (3.6)	3.8 (9.7)	5.3 (13)	9.9 (25)
Average precipitation days (≥ 0.01 in)	4.2	4.8	6.2	9.0	11.0	11.1	8.2	7.3	6.1	6.9	4.5	4.5	83.8
Average snowy days (≥ 0.1 in)	3.1	3.7	3.3	2.2	0.0	0.0	0.0	0.0	0.0	1.1	2.7	3.7	19.8
Source 1: NOAA
Source 2: National Weather Service

Climate data for Mission, South Dakota, 1991–2020 normals, extremes 1966–2012
Month	Jan	Feb	Mar	Apr	May	Jun	Jul	Aug	Sep	Oct	Nov	Dec	Year
Record high °F (°C)	75 (24)	74 (23)	85 (29)	95 (35)	98 (37)	107 (42)	111 (44)	108 (42)	104 (40)	95 (35)	85 (29)	71 (22)	111 (44)
Mean maximum °F (°C)	58.0 (14.4)	61.5 (16.4)	73.8 (23.2)	82.3 (27.9)	89.1 (31.7)	94.9 (34.9)	101.4 (38.6)	99.4 (37.4)	95.6 (35.3)	84.0 (28.9)	71.2 (21.8)	57.9 (14.4)	102.5 (39.2)
Mean daily maximum °F (°C)	34.2 (1.2)	37.5 (3.1)	47.8 (8.8)	57.4 (14.1)	68.4 (20.2)	79.4 (26.3)	87.4 (30.8)	85.8 (29.9)	77.1 (25.1)	61.6 (16.4)	47.7 (8.7)	37.0 (2.8)	60.1 (15.6)
Daily mean °F (°C)	22.9 (−5.1)	25.7 (−3.5)	35.3 (1.8)	44.9 (7.2)	56.2 (13.4)	67.1 (19.5)	74.1 (23.4)	72.2 (22.3)	62.8 (17.1)	48.2 (9.0)	35.5 (1.9)	25.6 (−3.6)	47.5 (8.6)
Mean daily minimum °F (°C)	11.6 (−11.3)	13.9 (−10.1)	22.8 (−5.1)	32.3 (0.2)	44.0 (6.7)	54.8 (12.7)	60.9 (16.1)	58.5 (14.7)	48.4 (9.1)	34.9 (1.6)	23.3 (−4.8)	14.2 (−9.9)	35.0 (1.7)
Mean minimum °F (°C)	−11.2 (−24.0)	−8.6 (−22.6)	0.2 (−17.7)	15.8 (−9.0)	28.3 (−2.1)	41.3 (5.2)	49.0 (9.4)	45.7 (7.6)	31.2 (−0.4)	16.7 (−8.5)	2.8 (−16.2)	−9.7 (−23.2)	−19.5 (−28.6)
Record low °F (°C)	−28 (−33)	−30 (−34)	−27 (−33)	6 (−14)	15 (−9)	27 (−3)	35 (2)	36 (2)	18 (−8)	1 (−17)	−16 (−27)	−32 (−36)	−32 (−36)
Average precipitation inches (mm)	0.48 (12)	0.67 (17)	1.12 (28)	2.50 (64)	3.38 (86)	3.68 (93)	2.61 (66)	1.80 (46)	1.75 (44)	1.69 (43)	0.68 (17)	0.56 (14)	20.92 (530)
Average snowfall inches (cm)	7.2 (18)	7.5 (19)	7.1 (18)	5.7 (14)	0.1 (0.25)	0.0 (0.0)	0.0 (0.0)	0.0 (0.0)	0.0 (0.0)	1.2 (3.0)	6.1 (15)	6.6 (17)	41.5 (104.25)
Average extreme snow depth inches (cm)	5.8 (15)	4.8 (12)	5.8 (15)	3.9 (9.9)	0.0 (0.0)	0.0 (0.0)	0.0 (0.0)	0.0 (0.0)	0.1 (0.25)	0.7 (1.8)	4.3 (11)	5.9 (15)	11.2 (28)
Average precipitation days (≥ 0.01 in)	5.8	5.7	6.6	9.2	10.5	11.8	8.8	7.3	6.7	7.2	4.9	4.7	89.2
Average snowy days (≥ 0.1 in)	4.0	3.8	3.2	1.7	0.0	0.0	0.0	0.0	0.0	0.7	2.5	3.7	19.6
Source 1: NOAA
Source 2: National Weather Service (mean maxima/minima, snow depth 1981–2010)

== Demographics ==
Historical population
Census	Pop.	Note	%±
1940	452		—
1950	388		−14.2%
1960	611		57.5%
1970	739		20.9%
1980	748		1.2%
1990	730		−2.4%
2000	904		23.8%
2010	1,182		30.8%
2020	1,156		−2.2%
U.S. Decennial Census

The closely linked communities of Antelope and White Horse, and other nearby settlements, including School District and Bureau of Indian Affairs housings and private communities, are located outside the city limits.

=== 2020 census ===
As of the 2020 census, Mission had a population of 1,156. The median age was 22.7 years. 44.9% of residents were under the age of 18 and 7.8% of residents were 65 years of age or older. For every 100 females there were 88.3 males, and for every 100 females age 18 and over there were 83.0 males age 18 and over.

0.0% of residents lived in urban areas, while 100.0% lived in rural areas.

There were 360 households in Mission, of which 56.7% had children under the age of 18 living in them. Of all households, 25.6% were married-couple households, 18.9% were households with a male householder and no spouse or partner present, and 43.6% were households with a female householder and no spouse or partner present. About 22.8% of all households were made up of individuals and 8.6% had someone living alone who was 65 years of age or older.

There were 438 housing units, of which 17.8% were vacant. The homeowner vacancy rate was 0.0% and the rental vacancy rate was 10.5%.

Racial composition as of the 2020 census
Race	Number	Percent
White	127	11.0%
Black or African American	3	0.3%
American Indian and Alaska Native	975	84.3%
Asian	0	0.0%
Native Hawaiian and Other Pacific Islander	0	0.0%
Some other race	3	0.3%
Two or more races	48	4.2%
Hispanic or Latino (of any race)	34	2.9%

=== 2010 census ===
As of the census of 2010, there were 1,182 people, 398 households, and 298 families living in the city. The population density was 2,003.4 inhabitants per square mile (773.5/km^{2}). There were 443 housing units at an average density of 750.8 per square mile (289.9/km^{2}). The racial makeup of the city was 11.7% White, 0.3% African American, 85.4% Native American, 0.1% Asian, 0.2% from other races, and 2.5% from two or more races. Hispanic or Latino of any race were 2.1% of the population.

There were 398 households, of which 57.0% had children under the age of 18 living with them, 21.9% were married couples living together, 39.7% had a female householder with no husband present, 13.3% had a male householder with no wife present, and 25.1% were non-families. 21.4% of all households were made up of individuals, and 5.8% had someone living alone who was 65 years of age or older. The average household size was 2.97 and the average family size was 3.30.

The median age in the city was 23.2 years. 40.1% of residents were under the age of 18; 14.3% were between the ages of 18 and 24; 23.1% were from 25 to 44; 17.2% were from 45 to 64; and 5.2% were 65 years of age or older. The gender makeup of the city was 46.1% male and 53.9% female.

=== 2000 census ===
As of the census of 2000, there were 904 people, 302 households, and 214 families living in the city. The population density was 1,523.4 inhabitants per square mile (588.2/km^{2}). There were 339 housing units at an average density of 571.3 per square mile (220.6/km^{2}). The racial makeup of the city was 74.89% Native American, 22.01% White, 0.11% African American, and 2.99% from two or more races. Hispanic or Latino of any race were 1.33% of the population.

There were 302 households, out of which 46.7% had children under the age of 18 living with them, 33.4% were married couples living together, 27.5% had a female householder with no husband present, and 29.1% were non-families. 24.5% of all households were made up of individuals, and 7.0% had someone living alone who was 65 years of age or older. The average household size was 2.82 and the average family size was 3.34.

In the city, the population was spread out, with 40.2% under the age of 18, 9.8% from 18 to 24, 25.6% from 25 to 44, 17.7% from 45 to 64, and 6.7% who were 65 years of age or older. The median age was 25 years. For every 100 females, there were 87.2 males. For every 100 females age 18 and over, there were 82.8 males.

As of 2000 the median income for a household in the city was $23,631, and the median income for a family was $21,375. Males had a median income of $25,417 versus $22,778 for females. The per capita income for the city was $11,374. About 29.5% of families and 30.8% of the population were below the poverty line, including 39.0% of those under age 18 and 24.4% of those age 65 or over.

== Notable people ==
- Bob Barker, host of The Price Is Right

== See also ==
- List of cities in South Dakota
