= Tribal colleges and universities =

Type of American higher education institution

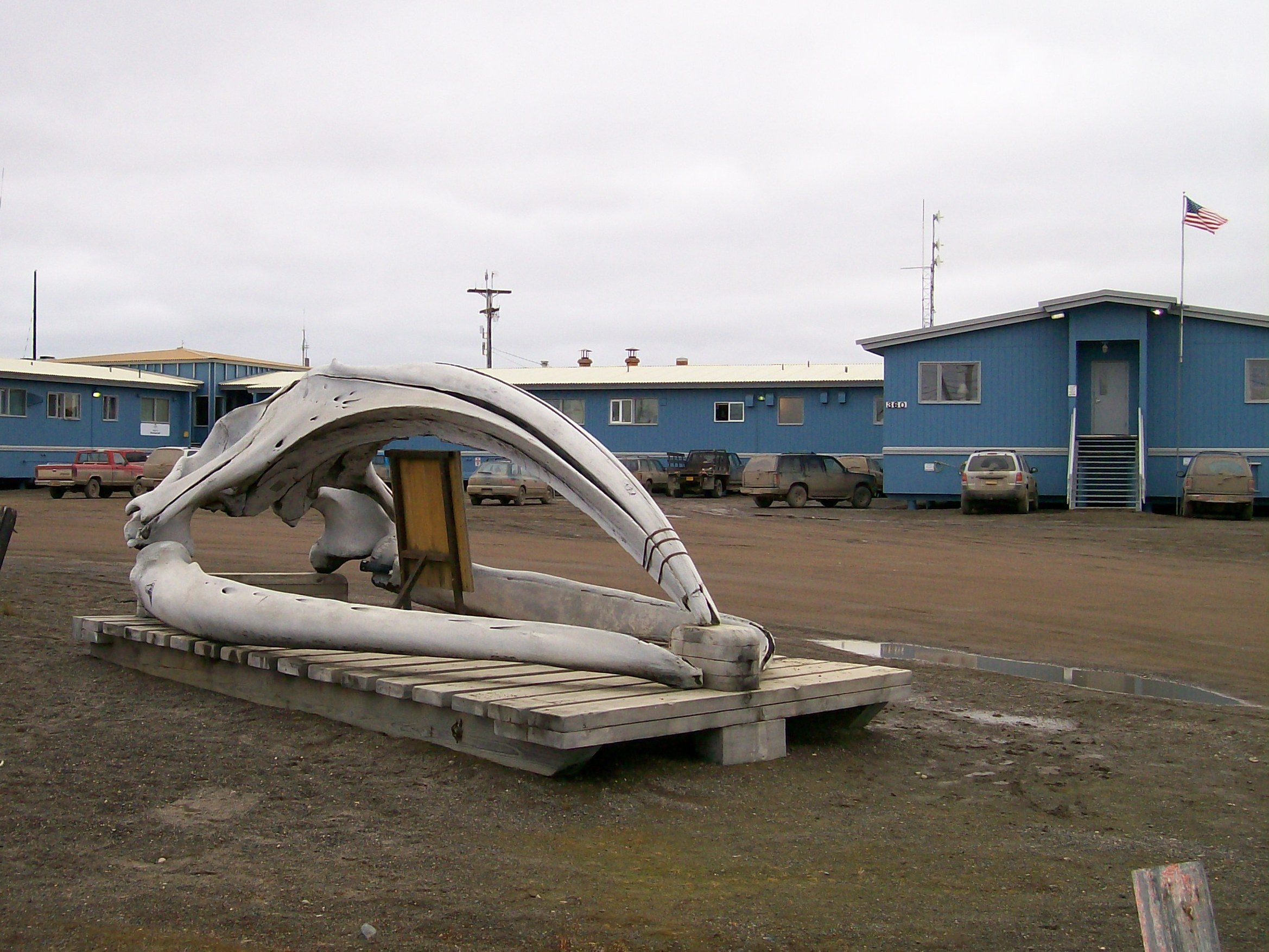
Bowhead whale skull in front of Iḷisaġvik College's main building in Utqiaġvik, Alaska

Tribal colleges and universities (TCUs) are a category of higher education, minority-serving institutions in the United States defined in the Higher Education Act of 1965. Each qualifies for funding under the Tribally Controlled Colleges and Universities Assistance Act of 1978 (25 U.S.C. 1801 et seq.) or the Navajo Community College Act (25 U.S.C. 640a note); or is cited in section 532 of the Equity in Educational Land-Grant Status Act of 1994 (7 U.S.C. 301 note).

These educational institutions are distinguished by being controlled and operated by federally recognized American Indian tribes; they have become part of Native Americans' institution-building in order to pass on their own cultures. The first was founded by the Navajo Nation in 1968 in Arizona, and several others were established in the 1970s. As of 1994, they have been authorized by Congress as land-grant colleges.

As of 2018, there are 32 fully accredited Tribal Colleges and Universities (TCUs) in the United States, with one formal candidate for accreditation.

Native American-Serving Nontribal Institutions (NASNTIs) are institutions other than TCUs that serve an undergraduate population that is both low income (at least 50% receiving Title IV needs-based assistance) and in which Native American students constitute at least 10% (e.g., Southeastern Oklahoma State University).

== History ==
The Tribal College movement developed as part of the Native American "self-determination" movement of the 1960s. Federally recognized tribes wanted to have more control over the education of their children and ways to pass on their culture, and develop contemporary skills to build economic capacity. They have developed tribal colleges on or near Indian reservations. These provide access to post-secondary education, accredited degrees, and vocational training for both Indian and non-Indian students in many rural areas.

The first tribal college was Navajo Community College, now called Diné College, founded on the reservation in Tsaile, Arizona, in 1968. It was accredited in 1979. Tensions immediately arose between advocates of two philosophies: one that the tribal colleges should have the same criteria, curriculum, and procedures for educational quality as mainstream colleges, and the other that the faculty and curriculum should be closely adapted to the particular historical culture of a tribe. Faculty and staff had a high rate of turnover, exacerbated by very tight budgets. Several other tribal colleges were established in the 1970s, and enrollment at such institutions has steadily increased.

Since the 1970s, when many of these colleges were founded, most tribes have developed curricula that incorporate their Native culture and tradition. These institutions are generally located on reservations and face problems similar to those of other rural educational institutions: recruitment and retention of students and faculty because of relative isolation (in some cases quite strong) and competition from other institutions, and curriculum issues. Lack of funding, along with the minimal resources of some tribes, have been obstacles. For some Native American nations, revenues from casino gambling have aided in their building educational institutions.

In general, enrollment has increased significantly, particularly in areas where reservations have significant populations. In 1982, the total enrollment at tribal colleges in the United States was approximately 2,100; by 2003, it had increased to 30,000. This also reflects a return to reservations by numerous American Indians, for instance, on the Great Plains. Since the 1990s, the movement to place greater emphasis on culturally appropriate education specific to Native Americans has also helped boost enrollment.

By contrast, California's only tribal college, D-Q University located west of Davis, California, closed in 2005. It re-opened briefly with six students in 2006. Unlike most of the institutions, it is not affiliated with a single tribe or reservation.

In 1994 under the Elementary and Secondary Education Reauthorization Act, the tribal colleges were authorized by the US Congress as land-grant colleges. Most offer two-year degrees, although six are four-year institutions, and three have master's degree programs. Several colleges, such as the College of the Menominee Nation, have developed transfer agreements with affiliated state universities to allow students who graduate from the two-year tribal college to receive junior status at the state university system. Sinte Gleska University in South Dakota has a master's program affiliated with Red Crow Community College and Canadian universities in Alberta.

On December 2, 2011, President Barack Obama signed Executive Order 13592—Improving American Indian and Alaska Native Educational Opportunities and Strengthening Tribal Colleges and Universities, which ordered the Department of Education to work closely with tribal governments to help improve educational opportunities provided to all AI/AN students, including students attending post-secondary institutions such as Tribal Colleges and Universities. This executive order was signed to address the high drop out rate, to help close the achievement gap between AI/AN students and their non-native peers, while also preserving and revitalizing Native languages. This executive order was run by the White House Initiative on American Indian and Alaska Native Education. This initiative has been implemented by the Department of Education, and it supports activities that will expand educational opportunities and improve education outcomes for all AI/AN students.

As of 2013, Montana is the only state in which each Indian reservation has established a fully accredited tribal college. The University of Montana "was the first to establish dual admission agreements with all of the tribal colleges and as such it was the first institution in the nation to actively facilitate student transfer from the tribal colleges." In addition, the Montana legislature passed the Indian Education for All Act, creating the only state mandate for public schools to "teach American Indian history, culture, and heritage to preschool through higher education students."

== Research ==
=== Faculty development ===
In 2017 Ahmed Al-Asfour and Suzanne Young conducted a survey study of the professional development needs of faculty at TCUs. The areas of greatest concern were workload and low salary. Low teacher salaries may be attributed to the unique situation TCUs have related to funding. Most tribal colleges are located on reservations and therefore are not supported by local taxes, nor do they pay them. They receive financial support only from the federal government, chiefly through the Bureau of Indian Affairs, and remain chronically underfunded. Al-Asfour and Young say that this underfunding and subsequent low faculty salaries may be a cause of low retention of faculty. As a result, mostly inexperienced faculty accept positions at TCUs.

Additionally, Al-Asfour and Young found that non-Native American faculty reported significantly greater challenges in learning Native American culture compared to Native American faculty. They say that faculty development should focus on training the non-native staff in regard to Native American culture, to better serve their population of students. TCUs are unique institutions and therefore require special attention to understand the needs of their faculty and to allocate resources as needed.

=== Role of mentorship ===
Research done by Carol Ward, Kacey Widdison Jones, Ryan Coles, Loren Rich, Stan Knapp and Robert Madsen at Chief Dull Knife College (CDKC) found that AI/AN students had a special need for direct culturally sensitive mentoring and social support. The case study of CDKC explored the outcome which students attributed to their experiences working on a research project under a mentor, and the effects this participation had on student attitudes.

They studied students who were involved in a variety of research collaborations with the University of Montana and Montana State University under mentorship from the research director. From this one-on-one instruction and mentorship, the students' perceptions of themselves, their abilities, and their futures increased significantly. After being mentored, they believed they could incorporate science into their educational and career future. They completed upper-level science research methods courses despite having previously struggled in math and science instruction. Most importantly, the students were able to recognize their academic strengths rather than viewing themselves negatively, and they changed how they envisioned their futures. Ward et al. found that "student involvement in instructor-led mentored research projects as well as independent and student-led research activities improved student performance and confidence in math and science, improved course retention and completion, and resulted in more students planning to pursue four-year degrees."

=== Role in preserving native languages ===
As the use of native languages decreases, Paskus explored the role TCUs have in language preservation among college-age students and youth. Many TCUs have Native language courses and are also beginning to bring those programs to elementary students and younger. Implementers of these programs have already begun to see small achievements, such as more often hearing greetings and other exchanges on campus taking place in native languages. Some of these programs focus on a model that connects the children with elders, and help the parents to learn the language too. TCUs may be lighting the spark in this movement.

=== Study of TCU drug and alcohol problem and solutions ===
Duran, Magarati, Parker, Egashira, and Kipp conducted a web-based survey of 340 students, faculty and staff to better understand how TCU members perceived drug and alcohol problems and their readiness to address these issues, with results published in 2013. They found that both students and staff perceive alcohol and drug problems as being a serious problem, but also the TCUs have strong systems of social capital in place to address them. These systems include staff who will intervene, traditional activities that bring people together, and overall respect for one another. TCUs have been able to gain grants to enhance academic achievement by addressing alcohol and drug needs on campuses and continuing to study them. Duran et al. argue "these are the first steps to develop a culturally appropriate and sustainable alcohol and drug abuse treatment and prevention strategy for TCUs, which in turn enhances post-secondary academic success among Native students".

== Affiliations ==
In 1973, the first six American Indian tribally controlled colleges established the American Indian Higher Education Consortium (AIHEC) to provide a support network as they worked to influence federal policies on American Indian higher education. Today, AIHEC has grown to 37 Tribal Colleges and Universities in the United States. Each of these institutions was created and chartered by its own tribal government or the federal government for a specific purpose: to provide higher education opportunities to American Indians through programs that are locally and culturally based, holistic, and supportive. Through AIHEC, the colleges continue to work together to influence policy and build programs in all facets of higher education. They receive technical assistance in key areas; network with one another, federal agencies, other institutions, and potential partners; mentor new institutions; and plan new initiatives to address evolving areas of need. AIHEC provides leadership and influences public policy on American Indian and Alaska Native higher education issues through advocacy, research, and programmatic initiatives; promotes and strengthens Indigenous languages, cultures, communities, lands, and tribal nations; and through its unique position, serves member institutions and emerging TCUs. AIHEC activities are supported by member dues, grants and contracts. AIHEC is a 501(c)(3) organization governed by a board of directors, which is composed of the presidents of the accredited United States-based TCUs. The board elects from its membership an executive committee to oversee the activities of the collective body and the AIHEC staff.

== Special programs ==
TCLI group photo, 2007

Based in Huntsville, Alabama, Tribal Earth Science & Technology Education (TRESTE) is a NASA-funded team of nine tribal higher education institutions and the Universities Space Research Association's Earth System Science Program. The collaboration is designed to enhance Earth system science and geospatial education using problem-based teaching techniques in order to inspire undergraduate students for careers in Earth system science, the physical sciences, and other fields of engineering or science.

Alternate tribal higher education programs are available, including the Tribal College Librarians Institute (TCLI), founded in 1989. Library faculty at Montana State University Library responded to a request for a special workshop to address the professional needs of librarians at Montana's seven tribal colleges. In 1992, as tribal college librarians in the region learned of this successful annual workshop, TCLI widened participation to include tribal college librarians from North Dakota and South Dakota, and in 1993 to include the state of Washington.

In 1994, TCLI received a grant from the American Indian Higher Education Consortium (AIHEC) to expand the program in order to include librarians from all AIHEC-affiliated libraries. Funding for TCLI is provided by MSU Libraries and supplemented with grants from private and government institutions. Most recently, TCLI has been funded by IMLS grants for the years 2010–2021. Other funding sources have included businesses and foundations such as EBSCO and the Paul G. Allen Foundation, and academic and governmental sources, such as the MSU Center for Native American Studies, the National Agriculture Library, the National Museum of the American Indian, and the Institute for Museum and Library Services. The bulk of the program budget is spent on providing travel funds to participants. To date, the institute has been able to offer limited travel funds to all those requesting assistance.

TCLI has been held primarily in Bozeman, Montana. Funding was received from the National Agricultural Library in 2001 and from the National Museum of the American Indian in 2006 to hold the Institute in Washington, D.C. In 2012, TCLI convened in Tulsa, Oklahoma, in conjunction with the Association of Tribal Archives, Libraries and Museums (ATALM) annual conference, through IMLS funding. Evaluations each year are overwhelmingly positive. Participants regard the institute as a unique opportunity to meet with other tribal college librarians. Many librarians have come to regard this as 'the meeting' they will attend each year, because no other addresses their particular needs as well.

== Publications ==
Tribal College Journal of American Indian Higher Education is a culture-based publication that addresses issues in American Indian and Alaska higher education. The award-winning journal has published articles by both journalists and scholars. It provides a forum for tribal students, staff, faculty, and college administrators to discuss their needs, successes, and missions. Paul Boyer founded the journal after traveling among tribal colleges for a study, and realizing there was no central forum for them to share information about their programs.

On November 14, 1989, the tribal college presidents on the American Indian Higher Education Consortium (AIHEC) board passed a motion to support the journal with $15,000 to cover four quarterly issues, a huge commitment at the time for the tribal colleges. The AIHEC board gave it the editorial independence it needed to maintain credibility, so it was not a typical in-house publication.

The journal was assisted financially particularly by the Lannan Foundation and W.K. Kellogg Foundation, and the Christian A. Johnson Foundation, Carnegie Foundation, Phillips Petroleum Foundation, and Handsel Foundation.

== Scholarships ==
The American Indian College Fund, originally located in New York City, but now based in Denver, Colorado, provides scholarships for students at US tribal colleges and universities. Foundation and private-sector donations are crucial to its success. The Fund is dedicated to increasing the number of American Indians who hold college degrees. In 2008, some 14.5% of American Indians had a college degree, less than half the national average. The Fund provides scholarships to more than 4,000 American Indian students annually. As of 2008, the Fund had provided 143,281 scholarships and $237.1 million to support American Indian communities. The Fund is the largest and highest-rated American Indian nonprofit organization in the United States.

Other scholarship programs are sometimes unique to a specific program, geographic, area or tribe. Examples are the Tribal Training Grant, Tribal Higher Education Scholarship program, and Alyeska Match Scholarship, for Alaskan Natives. and Intertribal Higher Education Program.

The Native American Journalists Association (NAJA), founded by journalist and publisher Tim Giago (Oglala Lakota), also has a foundation that offers scholarships and internships to American Indian students in journalism. It sponsors three seminars annually for working American Indian journalists and those in the business end.

University College Cork, a university in Ireland, offers scholarships to members of the Choctaw to undertake a master's degree at the university, to include both tuition and living expenses. The program was established to commemorate the generous donation given in the mid-19th century by members of the Choctaw to the Irish people during the Great Famine.

== Legal codes ==
Specific Executive Orders govern Indian tribe higher education operations in the United States:

- E.O. 13021 Tribal Colleges and Universities

E.O. 13021 is the main Executive Order involving Tribal Colleges and Universities. Signed by President Clinton on October 19, 1996, this Executive Order was put into place for the purposes of helping to : (a) ensure that tribal colleges and universities are more fully recognized as accredited institutions, have access to the opportunities afforded other institutions, and have Federal resources committed to them on a continuing basis; (b) establish a mechanism that will increase accessibility of Federal resources for tribal colleges and universities in tribal communities; (c) promote access to high-quality educational opportunity for economically disadvantaged students; (d) promote the preservation and the revitalization of American Indian and Alaska Native languages and cultural traditions; (e) explore innovative approaches to better link tribal colleges with early childhood, elementary, and secondary education programs; and (f) support the National Education Goals.

- E.O. 13096 American Indian and Alaska Native Education

Executive Order 13096, signed by President Clinton on August 6, 1998, states that "The Federal Government has a special, historic responsibility for the education of American Indian and Alaska Native students. Improving educational achievement and academic progress for American Indian and Alaska Native students is vital to the national goal of preparing every student for responsible citizenship, continued learning, and productive employment. The Federal government is committed to improving the academic performance and reducing the dropout rate of American Indian and Alaska Native students. To help fulfill this commitment in a manner consistent with tribal traditions and cultures, Federal agencies need to focus special attention on six goals: (1) improving reading and mathematics; (2) increasing high school completion and post-secondary attendance rates; (3) reducing the influence of long-standing factors that impede educational performance, such as poverty and substance abuse; (4) creating strong, safe, and drug-free school environments; (5) improving science education; and (6) expanding the use of educational technology." The Order claims a strategy of a comprehensive Federal response to address the fragmentation of government services available to American Indian and Alaska Native students and the complexity of inter-governmental relationships affecting the education of those students. The purpose of the Federal activities described in this order was to develop a long-term, comprehensive Federal Indian education policy that will accomplish those goals. Title 25 of the United States Code defines the role of Indians in the United States Code:

- 25 U.S.C. ch. 20—Tribally Controlled College or University Assistance
- E.O. 13592 Improving American Indian and Alaska Native Educational Opportunities and Strengthening Tribal Colleges and Universities

== Tribal colleges and universities in other countries ==
In Aotearoa New Zealand, similar universities are termed wānanga. They serve the Māori community and in the case of Te Whare Wānanga o Awanuiārangi confer degrees up to a doctoral level.

== See also ==
- List of tribal colleges and universities
