= St. Francis Indian School =

School in South Dakota, United States

Coordinates: 43.1408°N 100.9007°W

Information
- Established: 1886; 140 years ago
- Grades: K-12
- Language: English; Lakota
- Affiliation: Bureau of Indian Education

St. Francis Indian School is a K-12 Native American school in St. Francis, South Dakota. It is tribally controlled and is affiliated with the Bureau of Indian Education (BIE).

Lakota people are served by the school.

== History ==
In 1886 the school, initially a Christian elementary school of St. Francis Mission meant to serve Native students with English as a second language, was established. It had 200-person boarding facilities, with all students boarding, and had one building, though a second was later added and the boarding facilities filled. A fire destroyed the existing facilities in January 1916. Concrete replacement facilities were built and school resumed in fall 1916. The high school classes began in 1931. It had a peak enrollment of 500 in the 1940s and 1950s. The dormitories were decommissioned in the 1960s after improvements to the roads were implemented. Tribal control came in 1979. Residents had a positive reception to gaining tribal control.

By 2004 the school began hiring teachers from other countries to fill vacancies.

== Curriculum ==
In 1986, in addition to English and Lakota, the school had the following foreign languages available: German, Latin, Russian, and Spanish. Some languages classes were only open to high school students.
