= Iron Shell =

Brulé Sioux chief

- Thukíha Máza
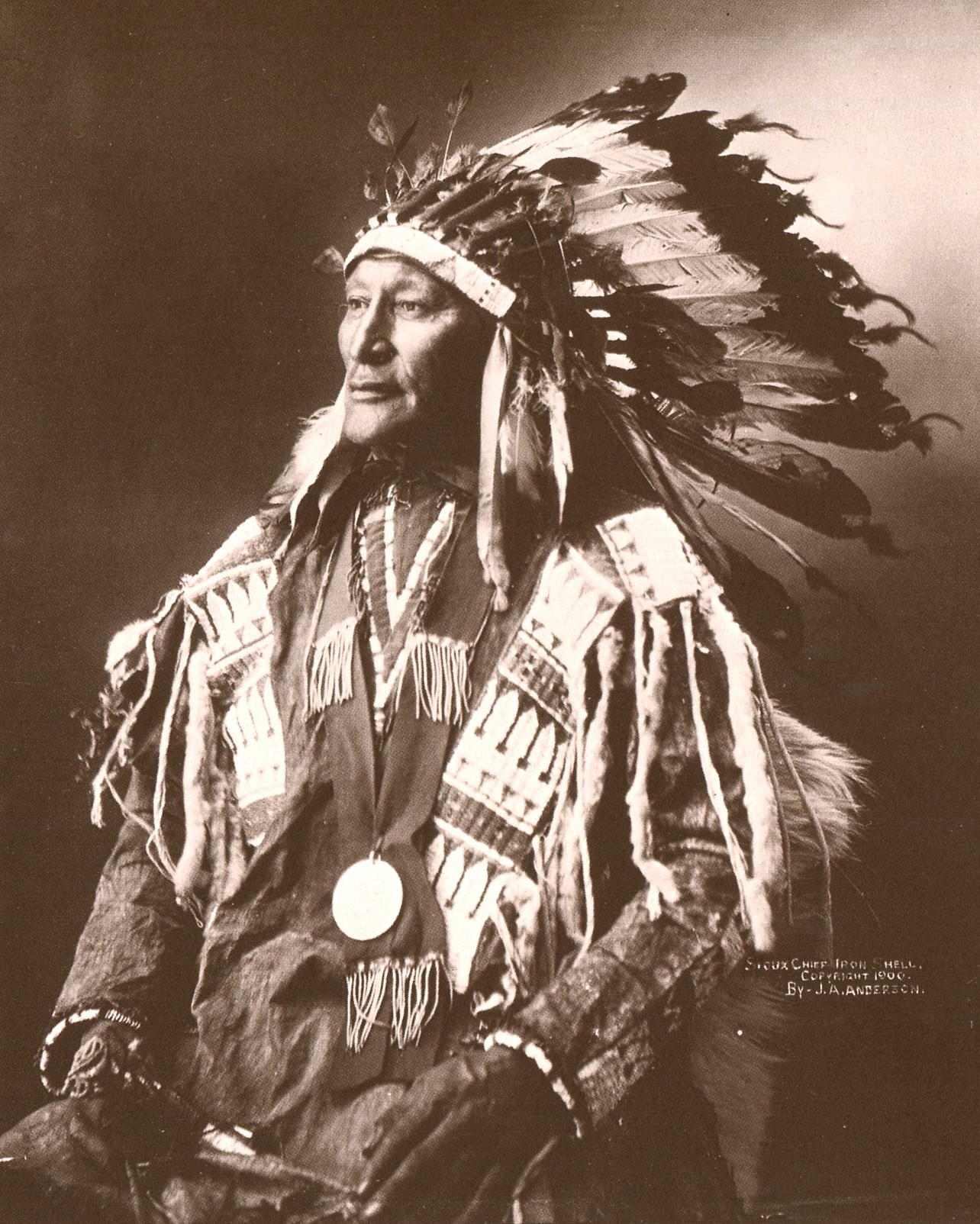
- Iron Shell (image copyright 1900)

Brulé Sioux leader

Personal details
- Born: c. 1816
- Died: 1896
- Children: Hollow Horn Bear
- Parent: Sicangu Chief Bull Tail

Iron Shell (Lakota: Thukíha Máza; c. 1816 – 1896) was a Brulé Sioux chief. He initially became prominent after an 1843 raid on the Pawnee, and became sub-chief of the Brulé under Little Thunder. He became chief of the Brulé Orphan Band during the Powder River War of 1866-1868.

After the Sioux broke the United States wagon train of gold payments for the civil war, he signed the Fort Laramie Treaty of 1868, and settled within the Great Sioux Reservation. He lived the remainder of his life on what is now known as the Rosebud Indian Reservation. (The Great Sioux Reservation was broken up by the US in 1889, and divided among five smaller reservations.) Hollow Horn Bear was the son of Iron Shell.

== Biography ==
Iron Shell was born in about 1816. He was the son of Sicangu Chief Bull Tail. "Sicangu" meant "burnt thighs", the name given to some of the Lakota people who had been caught in a prairie fire that burned their legs. The French later gave them the name Brulé.

During a raid on the Pawnee by the Brulé in 1843, Iron Shell received recognition for his actions. Thirteen years later, at Fort Pierre, under Little Thunder, Iron Shell was made a sub-chief of the Brulé.

When General William Harney and his 600 troops made a surprise attack in 1855 in the Battle of Ash Hollow against the Brulé at present-day Lewellen, Nebraska, Chief Iron Shell was there and fought against Harney's troops, who greatly outnumbered the Sioux. Two of Iron Shell's wives were captured that day, though Iron Shell escaped. A total of 86 Sioux were killed, including many women and children. That confrontation and massacre constituted the largest loss of life through death or capture and loss of property that the Sicangu had ever suffered.

Iron Shell became chief of the Brulé's Orphan Band during the Powder River War of 1866-1868. He led many attacks against the Omaha and Pawnee. On September 4, 1867, Chief Iron Shell and 180 of his followers arrived at North Platte. He eventually signed the Fort Laramie Treaty of 1868 and settled in the Upper Cut Meat District in the Great Sioux Reservation, established under that treaty in the West River area of present-day South Dakota. In 1889 the reservation was broken up by the US prior to North Dakota and South Dakota being admitted to the Union; his area was made part of what is known as the Rosebud Indian Reservation. He was buried near St. Francis, South Dakota.
