= Hollow Horn Bear =

Lakota chief and policeman

- Matȟó Héȟloǧeča
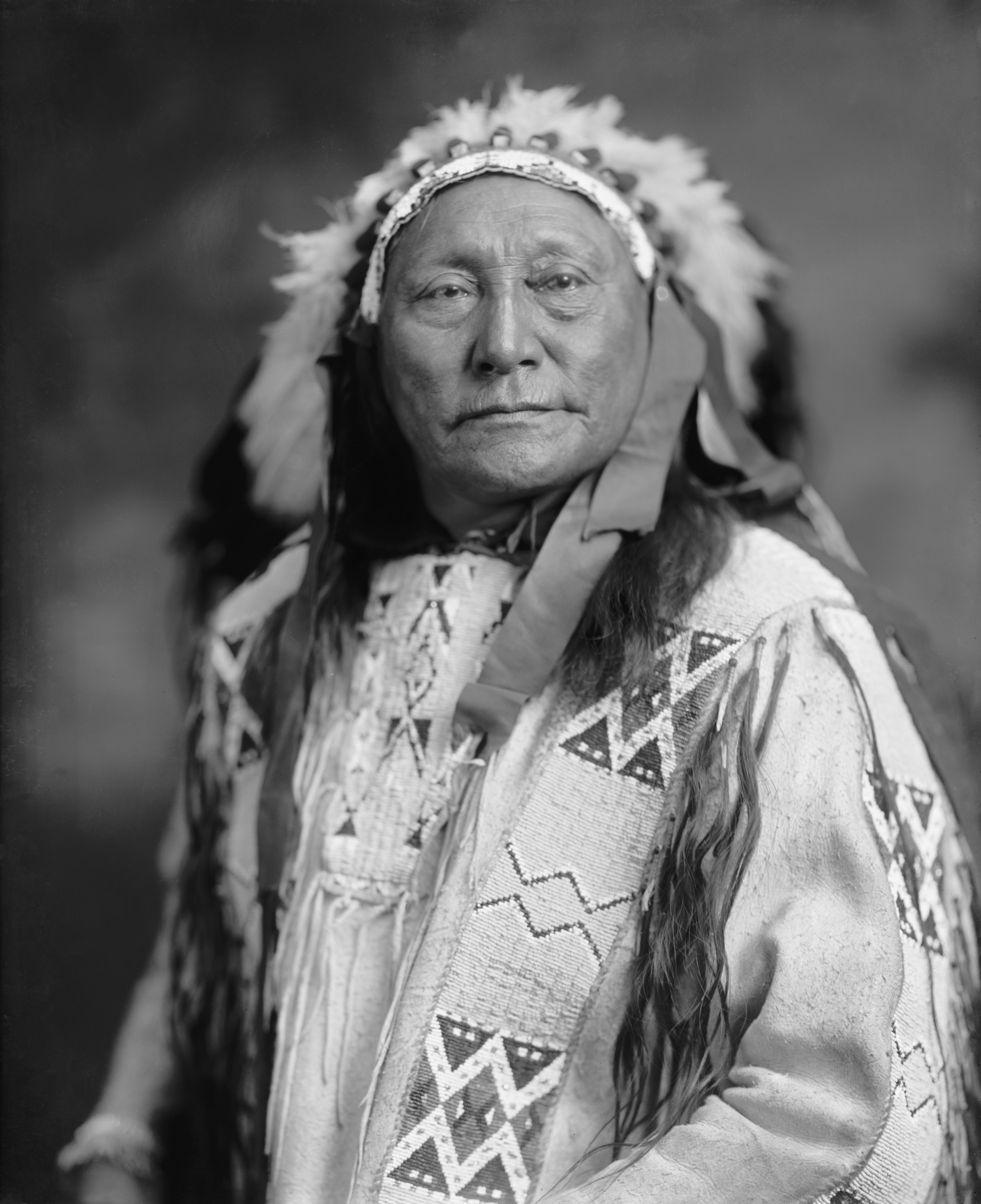

Brulé Lakota leader

Personal details
- Born: March 1850 Nebraska Territory, U.S.
- Died: March 15, 1913 (aged 62–63) Washington, D.C., U.S.
- Spouse: Good Bed (Note: Also recorded as Good Bed Woman. One source records Hollow Horn Bear as having a harem of seven wives, "as befitted a great chief," but lists only Good Bed by name.) (Note: Also transcribed Wastewin or Wisica Wacin Win)
- Relations: Grandson, Albert White Hat
- Children: John Hollow Horn Bear
- Parent(s): Father, Iron Shell

Hollow Horn Bear (Note: Christian name, Daniel) (Lakota, Matȟó Héȟloǧeča; (Note: Also transcribed as Mato Heli Dogeca and Mato He Oglogeca) March 1850 – March 15, 1913) was a Brulé Lakota chief. He fought in many of the battles of the Sioux Wars, including the Battle of Little Big Horn.

Later, while serving as police chief of the Rosebud Indian Reservation, he arrested Crow Dog for the murder of Spotted Tail, and later testified in the case of Ex parte Crow Dog, argued before the Supreme Court of the United States. He was the chief Speaker and negotiator for the Lakota, making multiple trips to Washington, D.C. to advocate on their behalf. He later took part in the inaugural parades for both presidents Theodore Roosevelt and Woodrow Wilson. He died of pneumonia in Washington in 1913 after the last of these trips.

Hollow Horn Bear was featured on a 1922 US postage stamp and a 1970 $10 Military Payment Certificate. Some sources record him as the basis for the image on the 1899 US five-dollar silver certificate and other depictions of Native Americans. A historical marker was erected in his honor in South Dakota in 1962.

In 2021 the Museum der Weltkulturen in Frankfurt, Germany, repatriated a leather shirt belonging to Chief Hollow Horn Bear, which it had legally acquired in the early 20th century. The museum gave the shirt to his great-grandson Chief Duane Hollow Horn Bear in a ceremony on June 12 in Rosebud, South Dakota. The museum said it returned the shirt for moral and ethical reasons, citing its high significance to the family and the Teton Lakota community.

== Early life ==
Hollow Horn Bear was born in modern Sheridan County, Nebraska. Named for his grandfather, he was one of seven sons of Chief Iron Shell and his wife. (Note: The seven sons are listed as Bear Dog, Hollow Horn Bear, Peter Iron Shell, Bird Necklace, He Frightens, Pretty Bird, and Stephen Brave Bird) His mother was Wants Everything. (Note: Transcribed as Wisica Wacin Win) During the Battle of Ash Hollow, the boy and his mother were captured by Federal soldiers and held at Fort Laramie, until they were released in October 1855.

Hollow Horn Bear took part in 31 battles of the Sioux Wars. (Note: One source says specifically "Hollow Horn Bear was in all the battles fought during the Sioux uprising," although it is unclear specifically to which portion or portions of the Sioux Wars this refers.) He took part in his first battle at age 12. At age 16 he and his father fought the Pawnee near present-day Genoa, Nebraska, and, still a teenager, he participated in raids against settlers and miners across the present-day states of Montana, Wyoming, and North and South Dakota. He went on to fight against the US Army in Wyoming and near present-day Crow Agency, Montana, and, in 1869, in actions against workers constructing the Union Pacific Railroad.

In 1874 Hollow Horn Bear married Good Bed, with whom he would have seven children. The same year he began working with the US Army as a scout.

In 1876 Hollow Horn Bear was with a band of Two Kettles Lakota searching for lost horses, when they happened upon a group of soldiers under the command of Alfred Terry. After two days of following Terry's men, they broke off and went ahead of the column to meet with the camp of those under Sitting Bull. After five days there, the Lakota took part in the Battle of the Little Bighorn. For his part, Hollow Horn Bear claimed to have personally fought there against Marcus Reno as well as George Armstrong Custer.

In 1880 Hollow Horn Bear traveled to Washington, D.C. to discuss issues regarding the reservation with the US government.

=== Arrest and trial of Crow Dog ===
Hollow Horn Bear was appointed the head of police of the Rosebud Agency in South Dakota, as part of the Indian Police on the reservation, organized by the Bureau of Indian Affairs. He arrested Crow Dog for the murder of Spotted Tail on August 5, 1881. Testifying in 1883 at the trial in Ex parte Crow Dog, Hollow Horn Bear recounted:

Mr. Lelar gave me a paper for the arrest of Crow Dog. Found defendant on a hill between White River and Rosebud Creek, where I made the arrest. Defendant had no clothes at the time, except a blanket, breechclout, and leggings and was on horseback. I did as I was ordered and took defendant to Fort Niobara.

Once found, Hollow Horn Bear testified he told Crow Dog he "wanted him to go with me to the post", to which he and Black Crow, who was with him at the time, agreed. Hollow Horn Bear had been a long-time friend of Crow Dog, and testified he had attended his wedding when he was nine years old. The case, argued before the US Supreme Court, became an important milestone in federal legal dealings with tribes, and contributed to the passage of the 1885 Major Crimes Act. Hollow Horn Bear resigned the position as head of police five years later due to illness.

== Later life ==
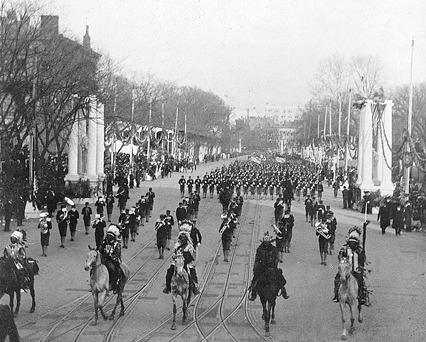
Hollow Horn Bear (far right) riding in the 1905 inaugural parade for Theodore Roosevelt, along with Buckskin Charlie, American Horse, Little Plume, and Geronimo

Hollow Horn Bear was an advocate for the Lakota throughout repeated negotiations from 1890 to 1910. One source noted, he was unable "to prevent the government from violating the 1868 treaty", (Note: See Treaty of Fort Laramie (1868)) but his "presence at the negotiations clearly pushed the agreements in the direction of Lakota interests", without which "things would have been much worse" for them.

In 1895 he was arrested over a dispute involving reduction of wages paid to members of his tribe who were working for the railroad. The company had originally cut the wages by half, although at the time of his arrest, they had changed it to a cut of 35%. The New York Times report summarized the tension saying:

Hollow Horn Bear appears to have an excellent record, extending back nearly twenty years. Col. Guy V. Henry is quoted as saying, in view of his services in 1876 and again in 1890, consideration should have been shown him unless he had committed some grievous fault more than the reports from that region have indicated. Still, threatening to burn the agency buildings and summoning large bodies of Indians to intimidate the agent must be accounted a grievous fault... (Note: It is unclear, but this may be a reference to Guy Vernor Henry, who was serving in the area at the time.)

In 1889 he was chosen to represent his tribe in negotiations with George Crook, over land sales aimed at opening up eastern parts of the Dakota Territory to include the Black Hills. He opposed selling of native lands in the Black Hills as part of the Black Hills Land Claim dispute. He instead wished to sell land in modern-day Gregory and Tripp counties in South Dakota, which "he saw as worthless prairie lands in comparison to the rich Black Hills." Hollow Horn Bear believed that individual ownership of land would protect his people legally, while commonly held land would "always be open to unilateral annexation by Congress".

The US government had earlier made the decision to improve their offer from the previous $1.00 per acre to $1.25, 160 acres (65 ha) to 320 acres (130 ha) of land for homesteads to the family heads, and provide horses for plowing rather than oxen. Hollow Horn Bear asked instead for $1.50 for the best land.

As reported by The Brooklyn Daily Eagle, Hollow Horn Bear was part of a delegation to Washington, D.C., in 1891, which met with Secretary of the Interior John Willock Noble. According to the paper, after taking the floor he:

asked that those Indians who had lost property during the late trouble might be reimbursed and went into financial matters in connection with the old and unfulfilled treaties.

He asked that money which was owed the tribe, and was to be spent on beef, instead be spent on cattle and horses, as crops had been a failure, but raising cattle had been successful. He asked for more housing to be built, and for construction of promised school houses. As the paper phrased it, "He wanted the children to have an opportunity to learn something."

In 1901, Hollow Horn Bear served as part of the Sioux delegation to Washington, D.C. after the Great Sioux Reservation was broken up into smaller reservations. (Note: See also the Dawes Act of 1887) In 1905, he was invited to take part in the presidential inauguration of Theodore Roosevelt, and was one of the Native Americans who rode in the inaugural parade on March 4, 1905. The others were Geronimo (Apache), Quanah Parker (Comanche), Buckskin Charley (Ute), Little Phime (Note: Recorded by modern sources as Little Plume) (Blackfoot) and American Horse (Oglala Lakota). (Note: American Horse appears to be incorrectly identified in the contemporary newspaper source as Cheyenne. He is elsewhere identified as Oglala.) Along with Geronimo and American Horse, he also took part that year in the Louisiana Purchase Exposition held in St. Louis.

Hollow Horn Bear converted to Catholicism in later life. The church had established St. Francis Mission at the reservation, as well as missions in other locations in South Dakota. Hollow Horn Bear's daughter was baptized in 1907, taking the Christian name "Emelie". Much of the family was later baptized. Hollow Horn Bear was baptized and took the name "Daniel"; his mother Wants Everything took the name "Susie". Many other Lakota were baptized along with them. He was a guest speaker in the 1906 convention of the American Federation of Catholic Societies in Boston, after having influenced much of his tribe to join the Catholic Church.

=== Death ===
In 1913, Hollow Horn Bear attended the dedication of the National American Indian Memorial, where he spoke on behalf of the tribes represented at the ceremony. He also took part in the inaugural parade for President Woodrow Wilson, and presented Wilson with "a peace pipe made of South Dakota red clay".

The chief caught pneumonia during the visit to the capital and died on March 15 at Providence Hospital. A funeral service was held in Washington, D.C., and newspapers reported several hundred in attendance. The crowd was so large that police were needed to clear the aisle so that the coffin could be brought in.

Writing on March 22, 1913, the Sacred Heart Review described the scene at the funeral:

Chiefs of the Blackfoot, Crow, and Sioux Indians, resplendent in feathers and colors, followed the body to the altar with heads bowed in grief. Kneeling in the front pews of the dimly-lit church, the red men paid their last homage to the dead chief. The funeral attracted a great crowd.

The chief's body left Washington via the train at Union Station; it was given a military escort by order of Secretary of the Interior Franklin Knight Lane. It was returned and buried at the Rosebud Reservation, at the St. Francis Mission there.

In 1917 his son Henry Hollow Horn Bear, requested permission to attend the inauguration of President Woodrow Wilson, to continue his father's role as chief. The Washington Times reported that he was assured he would be given "a warm reception" and a "prominent section in the parade." It took place Monday, March 5, 1917.

== Commemoration ==
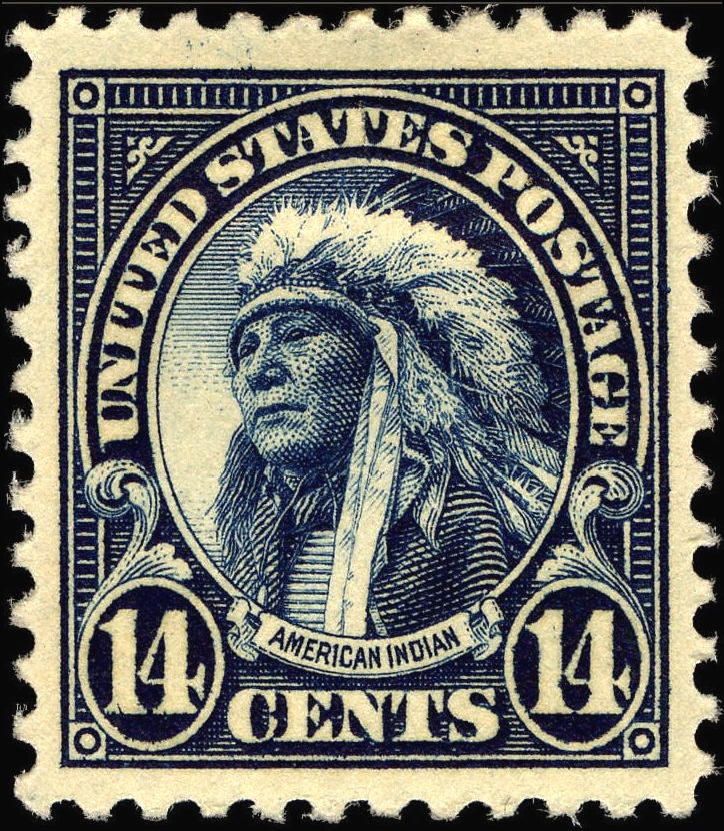
Hollow Horn Bear as featured on a 1922 US postage stamp

Hollow Horn Bear was featured on a 14-cent postage stamp and on a five dollar bill. Although identified as simply an "American Indian," the stamp, designed by Clair Aubrey Huston, was based on a photograph of Hollow Horn Bear taken by De Lancey Gill.

A historical marker was erected in Todd County, South Dakota on U.S. Route 18 in 1962 which states in part:

Hollow Horn Bear, born in 1850, fought the whiteman where he could find him in Wyoming and Montana, but after Spotted Tail was killed in 1881, he became Police Captain at Rosebud and in the Treaty of 1889, with General Crook, was the Indians chief orator and negotiator.

=== On currency ===
A number of sources report Hollow Horn Bear as the basis for the image featured on a US five-dollar bill, including The National Magazine and The Numismatist, a publication of the American Numismatic Association. One newspaper recounted in 1909, that upon visiting the Indian Bureau to secure about $300,000 in federal payments owed his tribe, "Hollow Horn Bear hopes to take home about 50,000 copies of his picture on the $5 certificates." Another contemporary source records him commemorated on both the five and 20-dollar-bills, stating "Hollow Horn Bear made a great speech in congress in 1889, and as he is a good looking specimen [sic] of his race, his picture was engraved on both the $5 and $20 dollar bills." However, this is disputed by other sources which record that the image on the five-dollar note was instead based on that of Running Antelope, a leader of the Hunkpapa Lakota.

At least one source says that Hollow Horn Bear was represented on the buffalo nickel. But, the coin's designer, Janes Earle Frasier, stated "Before the nickel was made I had done several portraits of Indians, among them Iron Tail, Two Moons, and one or two others, and probably got characteristics from those men in the head on the coins, but my purpose was not to make a portrait but a type."

Hollow Horn Bear was featured on the 1970 to 1973 Series 692 Military Payment Certificate issued by the US Military.

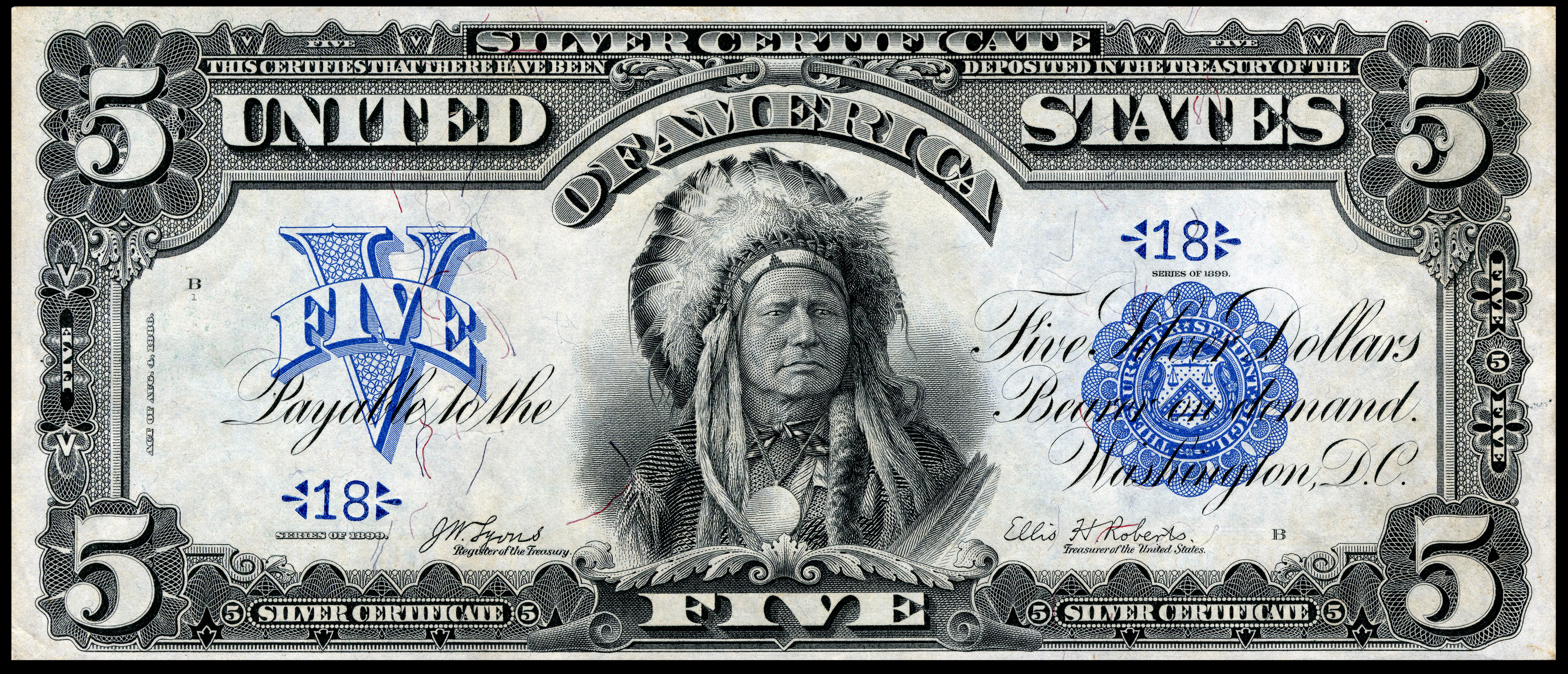
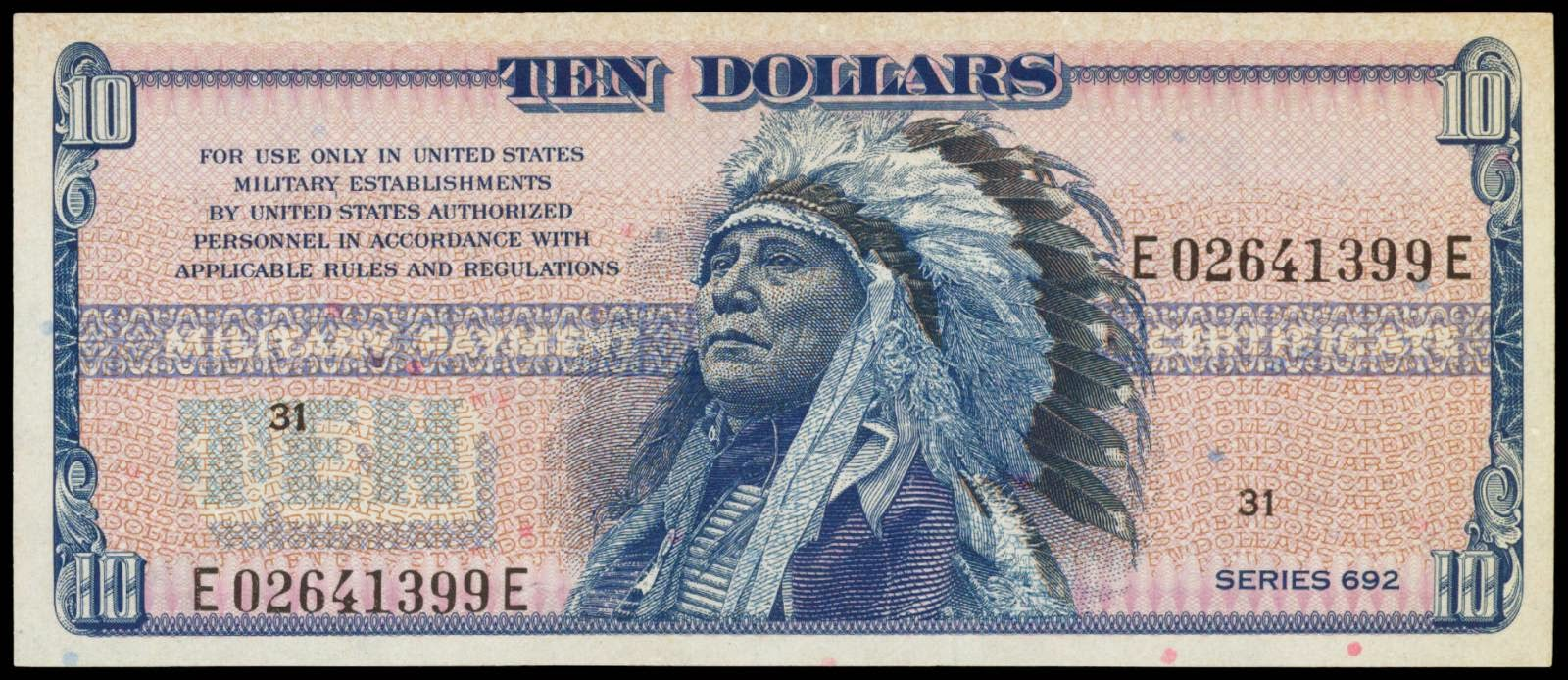
The 1899 US five-dollar-bill (top) described as depicting either Hollow Horn Bear or Running Antelope, and the 1970 $10 US Military Payment Certificate (bottom) depicting Hollow Horn Bear

== Repatriation ==
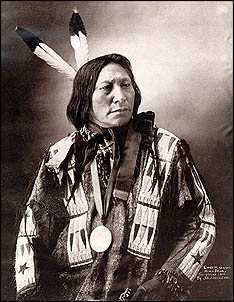
Chief Hollow Horn Bear in a tribal leather shirt, 1900

The Frankfurt-based Museum der Weltkulturen (Museum of World Cultures) repatriated a leather shirt belonging to Chief Hollow Horn Bear to his great-grandson Chief Duane Hollow Horn Bear, his family, and the Teton Lakota people in a ceremony on June 12, 2021 in Rosebud, South Dakota. The shirt had been part of the museum's collection since 1908, when it was legally acquired as part of an exchange of items with the American Museum of Natural History in New York. That museum had received it two years earlier as a donation by Graham Phelps Stokes. Chief Duane Hollow Horn Bear had a 1900 photograph of his great-grandfather wearing the shirt, which was taken by John Alvin Anderson. He used this documentation as part of his repatriation request in 2019.

The Museum made a statement:

“The Chief’s shirt is a culturally specific, identity-forming object of religious significance to the Teton Lakota Indigenous community. It bears special patterns of brightly colored glass beads and human hair, which are undoubtedly attributable to the Hollow Horn Bear family and prove personal possession prior to 1906. . . . For Chief Duane Hollow Horn Bear and his family, the return of the shirt is like the return of the great-grandfather himself.”

== See also ==
- Cultural assimilation of Native Americans
- List of Native American leaders of the Indian Wars
- List of American Indian Wars
- List of Native Americans of the United States
- U.S.–Native American treaties
- Population history of indigenous peoples of the Americas
