= Grattan massacre =

1854 killing of U.S. soldiers by Sioux in present-day Goshen County, Wyoming

- Part of the First Sioux War
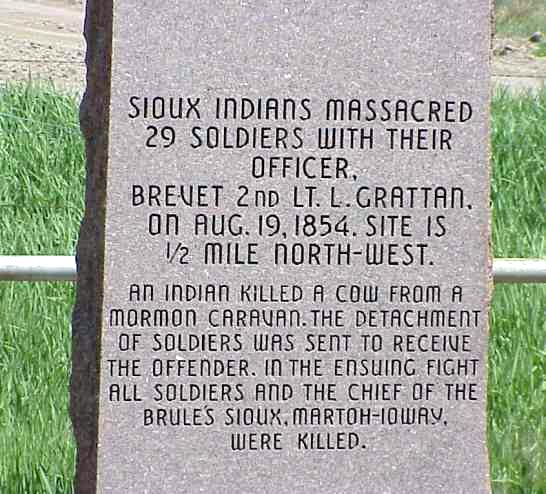
- Grattan Massacre marker, 2003
Date	August 19, 1854
Location	East of Fort Laramie, Nebraska Territory 42°7′56″N 104°24′21″W
Result	Lakota victory: Start of the First Sioux War

Belligerents
Lakota Sioux	United States

Commanders and leaders
Conquering Bear †; Little Thunder	John Grattan †

Strength
~ 500	31

Casualties and losses
2 killed	31 killed

The Grattan massacre, also referred to as the Grattan Fight, was the initial conflict of the First Sioux War, occurring on August 19, 1854, between the United States Army and the Lakota Sioux warriors. This event took place east of Fort Laramie, located in the Nebraska Territory, which is now part of Goshen County, Wyoming.

A small contingent of soldiers entered a large Sioux camp to apprehend an individual accused of killing a settler's cow, despite the fact that such issues were supposed to be resolved by the US Indian agent according to treaty agreements. After one of the soldiers fatally shot Chief Matȟó Wayúhi (Conquering Bear), the Sichangu Lakotas returned fire, resulting in the deaths of 29 soldiers, including Lieutenant John Grattan and a civilian interpreter.

== Background ==
From 1845–56, the Great Plains suffered a severe drought. Conditions of this drought dramatically reduced grass coverage, and Kiowa tribes recorded few to no bison on the Plains by the late 1840s. The lack of bison, in turn, caused hunger and starvation among the Plains American Indians. By 1853, U.S. Indian Agents noted, "many of the Cheyennes, Arapahoes, and Sioux, in a starving condition, on account of the scanty supply of buffalo[.]"

Late in summer of 1854, about 4,000 Sichangu and Oglala were camped east of Fort Laramie, in accordance with the terms of the Treaty of 1851. On August 17, a cow belonging to Mormon Christian J. Larsen (chaplain of the Hans P. Olsen Company of Danish immigrants) traveling on the nearby Oregon Trail, strayed and was killed by a visiting Miniconjou (Sioux) named High Forehead. Larsen barely noticed the incident in his journal, writing, "We passed a large encampment of Indians before we reached 'Fort Laramie'. They shot one of our cows, that was lame, and we let them have the meat. They also shot one, belonging to Hans Monsen, and it came into our camp, wounded, where we had it butchered."

Lt. Hugh Fleming, the senior officer of the small garrison, consulted with the chief, Matȟó Wayúhi, also known as Conquering Bear, to discuss the loss of livestock. Lt. Fleming was either unaware, or chose to ignore that these matters were supposed to be handled by the local Indian agent according to the terms of the Treaty of 1851. The Indian agent in this case was John Whitfield, who was due to arrive within days with annuities with which restitution could be made.

Despite knowing that the matter was not under the purview of the military, Conquering Bear still attempted to negotiate with Lt. Fleming, offering a horse from his personal herd or a cow from the tribe's herd; however, Larsen, the owner of the cow, reportedly persisted in demanding $25 ($1,000 in 2024) instead. Lt. Fleming asked the Sioux to arrest High Forehead and deliver him to the fort, which Conquering Bear refused; he had no authority over the Miniconjou and did not want to violate his people's tradition of hospitality. The day's talk ended in stalemate.

On August 19, 1854, Second Lieutenant John Lawrence Grattan of the U.S. 6th Infantry Regiment, a recent graduate of West Point and supernumerary waiting for a vacancy in the regiment, led an armed detachment into the Indian encampment to take custody of High Forehead and bring him back to the fort. Grattan was inexperienced and described as contemptuous of the Lakotas' ability as warriors. This was his first (and only) encounter with the Sioux.

A commander at Laramie later recalled, "There is no doubt that Lt. Grattan left this post with a desire to have a fight with the Indians, and that he had determined to take the man at all hazards." In Grattan's party were a sergeant, a corporal, 27 privates, and a French-Indian interpreter named Lucien Auguste; the military forces had two artillery pieces in addition to arms.

== Events ==
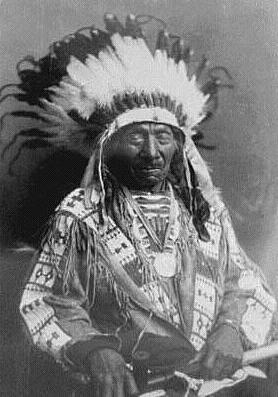
Red Cloud, late life photo.

By the time the detachment reached the encampment, the interpreter Auguste was intoxicated from drinking along the way, as he feared the encounter. Grattan broke his bottle and scolded him. Auguste was not well liked by the Sioux; he spoke only broken Dakota and had little grasp of other dialects. As they entered the encampment, he began to taunt the Sioux, calling their warriors women, and saying the soldiers were not there to talk, but to kill them all. James Bordeaux, who owned the nearby trading post and observed the encounter, later recounted Auguste's comments. (Note: Beck spells the trader's surname as Bordeau; the John Hunton Diary (1963) spells it as Bordeaux (the same as the city).)

Historians estimate the encampment had some 1,200 warriors among the total 4,800 population. According to Bordeaux, Lt. Grattan began to realize the risk and stopped to discuss the situation with the trader. Bordeaux advised him to talk directly with Conquering Bear and let him handle the situation. Grattan seemed to understand and continued on into the encampment. Going first to the lodge of High Forehead, he ordered him to surrender to the US forces. High Forehead said he would die first.

Grattan went to Conquering Bear, saying the Sioux should arrest the guilty party and turn him over. Conquering Bear refused but tried to negotiate, offering a horse as compensation for the cow. Bordeaux reportedly said the interpreter Auguste taunted the Sioux, and failed to fully or accurately translate Conquering Bear and Grattan's comments, as there seemed to be confusion between them. Conquering Bear asked for the trader Bordeaux to act as interpreter, as the Sioux trusted him and his language ability. Called by the Sioux, Bordeaux rode to the meeting place; later he said he could see the situation was out of hand. As Grattan pressed Conquering Bear, numerous Sioux warriors moved into flanking positions around the soldiers. Bordeaux returned to the trading post, where he told associates to arm themselves, as a fight was brewing.

Ending the discussion, Grattan began walking back to his column. A nervous soldier fired his gun, shooting a Sioux. The warriors started shooting arrows while leaders tried to take control. Conquering Bear was mortally wounded and died nine days later near the Niobrara River. The Sichangu Sioux warriors, led by Spotted Tail, then a rising war chief within their people, quickly killed Grattan, 11 of his men, and the interpreter. A group of some 18 soldiers retreated on foot trying to reach some rocks for defense, but they were cut off and killed by overcoming warriors led by Red Cloud, a rising war chief within the Oglala Sioux. One of Grattan's soldiers survived the immediate situation but later died of his wounds.

Conquering Bear was the only Lakota who was killed. The Sioux spared Bordeaux, both because he was married to a Sichangu Sioux woman and because he had a friendly relationship with the tribes.

== Aftermath ==
The enraged warriors "rampaged throughout the night, swearing to attack other whites." They rode against Fort Laramie the next morning but withdrew; they looted the trading post but did not harm Bordeaux. On the third day after the US attack, the Sichangu and Oglala abandoned the camp on the North Platte River and returned to their respective hunting grounds.

On the fourth day, the military asked Bordeaux to arrange a burial party. His team went to the scene and found that the slain soldiers had been ritually mutilated. Grattan's body was identified by his watch and was returned to the trading post for burial. The remains of the troops were interred at the site in a shallow mass grave. The soldiers' remains were later exhumed (unburied) and re-interred at Fort McPherson National Cemetery, where a white marble monument was erected in their memory. Grattan's remains were moved later and reinterred to Fort Leavenworth National Cemetery in Kansas. A historical marker was later erected about one-half mile from the site of the events.

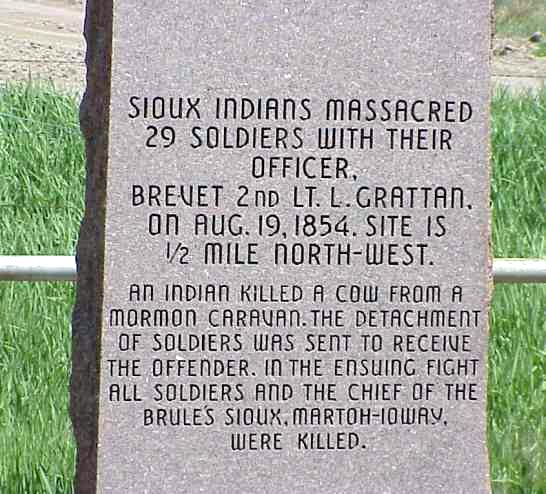
Historical marker near the site

The U.S. press called the event the "Grattan Massacre." Accounts generally ignored the US soldiers' instigation of the event by their failures: first, to leave it up to the Indian agent to settle, as called for in the treaty; and second, shooting chief Conquering Bear in the back.

When news of the fight reached the War Department, officials started planning retaliation to punish the Sioux. Secretary of War Jefferson Davis characterized the incident as "the result of a deliberately formed plan."

Col. William S. Harney was recalled from Paris in April 1855 and sent to Fort Kearny, where he assembled a command of 600 troops, consisting of men from the 6th Infantry, 10th Infantry, 4th Artillery, and his own 2nd US Dragoons. In total, he had four mounted companies led by Lt. Col. Philip St. George Cooke and five companies of infantry under Major Albemarle Cady. They set out on August 24, 1855, to find the Sioux and exact retribution. Harney was quoted as saying, "By God, I'm for battle—no peace."

Warned by Thomas S. Twiss of the Indian Bureau that the army had put a force in the field, half of the Lakota who were camped north of the Platte River went into Fort Laramie for protection as "friendlies". The other half, generally led by Conquering Bear's successor Little Thunder, remained at large. They considered themselves peaceful but knew that Harney was out with a force. They continued to harbor warriors sought by the army.

Harney engaged them in the Battle of Ash Hollow (also known as the Battle of Bluewater Creek) on September 3, 1855. U.S. soldiers killed 86 Sichangu Sioux, half of them women and children, in present-day Garden County, Nebraska. The New York Times and other newspapers recounted the battle as a massacre because so many women and children were killed. The village of 230 persons was caught between an assault by the infantry and a blocking force by the cavalry. Spotted Tail, principal war chief of the Sichangu, was surprised while unarmed and taking part in the parley; he was seriously wounded four times and two bullets passed through his chest, but still he killed or wounded 13 "long knives".

Harney returned to Fort Laramie with 70 prisoners, most of them women and children, including Spotted Tail's mother, wife and three children, and the wife of Iron Shell (Maza Pangeska). To make the Sichangu Women and children free, Harney claimed the delivery of the leaders of Grattan Fight, and Spotted Tail, Red Leaf (Waba Sha), Long Chin (Iku Hanska) and, some days later, Standing Elk (Hehaka Najin) and Red Plume (Wiyaka Sha), went to Fort Pierre, escorted by Iron Shell and the whole Sichangu crowd. On October 25, the three warriors sought by the expedition surrendered, were held for a year at Fort Leavenworth (where Spotted Tail was reached by his wife several months later), and were released.

Harney ordered the tribes to send representatives to a treaty council at Fort Pierre in March 1856, where a treaty was signed on terms dictated by the War Department. Twiss tried to undermine the treaty, and Harney had him removed from office, although he did not have the authority to do so; George W. Manypenny, Commissioner of Indian Affairs, successfully lobbied the Senate to reject the treaty, and Twiss was reinstated.

Harney's actions against the Lakota restrained them for nearly ten years. The US was soon involved in the American Civil War, and did not have resources to fight on the Great Plains.

Historians such as Griske believe the following nearly quarter-century of intermittent warfare on the Great Plains was triggered by the Grattan massacre. Others suggest numerous factors, especially US desire for control of lands that were Sioux territory, that contributed to make warfare inevitable.

In addition, Red Cloud admitted to having been present in the battle where thirty people died.

== See also ==
- List of battles won by Indigenous peoples of the Americas
- List of massacres in Wyoming

== Notes ==
Footnotes

Citations
