= Battle of Ash Hollow =

1855 massacre during the First Sioux War

Coordinates: 41°17′55″N 102°07′22″W

- Part of the First Sioux War, American Indian Wars
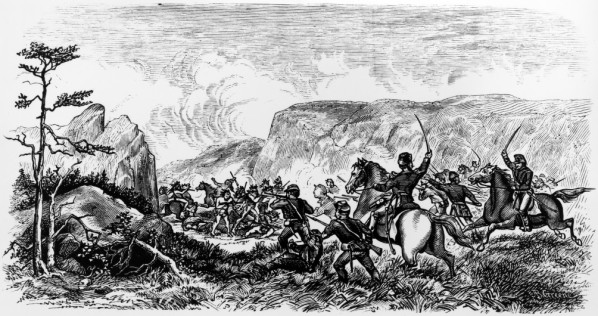
- An 1878 depiction of the Battle of Ash Hollow.
Date	September 3, 1855
Location	Ash Hollow, Nebraska
Result	United States victory

Belligerents
Sicangu	United States

Commanders and leaders
Little Thunder	(United States) William S. Harney

Strength
~250	~600

Casualties and losses
86 killed, 70 women and children captured	27 killed

The Battle of Ash Hollow, also known as the Battle of Blue Water Creek or the Harney Massacre, was an engagement of the First Sioux War, fought on September 2 and 3, 1855, between United States Army soldiers under Brig. Gen. William S. Harney and a band of the Sicangu Lakota along the Platte River in present-day Garden County, Nebraska. In the 20th century, the town of Lewellen, Nebraska, was developed here as a railroad stop.

The American force won the battle: the Sicangu women and children they killed made up nearly half the fatalities; other women and children made up most of the prisoners they took. The Army planned this punitive expedition in retaliation for the "Grattan Massacre" in August 1854, and for raids by Lakota in its wake.

== Overview ==
The battle was the defining engagement of a short war between the US and the Lakota Sioux over disputes concerning violations of the 1851 Treaty of Fort Laramie. In this battle 600 soldiers attacked 250 Sioux, killing 86 and capturing 70 women and children.

In March 1856, without authority to do so, commanding Gen. William Harney negotiated a peace treaty to stop further bloodshed with the Sioux. He required a centralized tribal government among the Lakota, by which he intended to hold leaders accountable for the actions of bands. The people were highly decentralized.

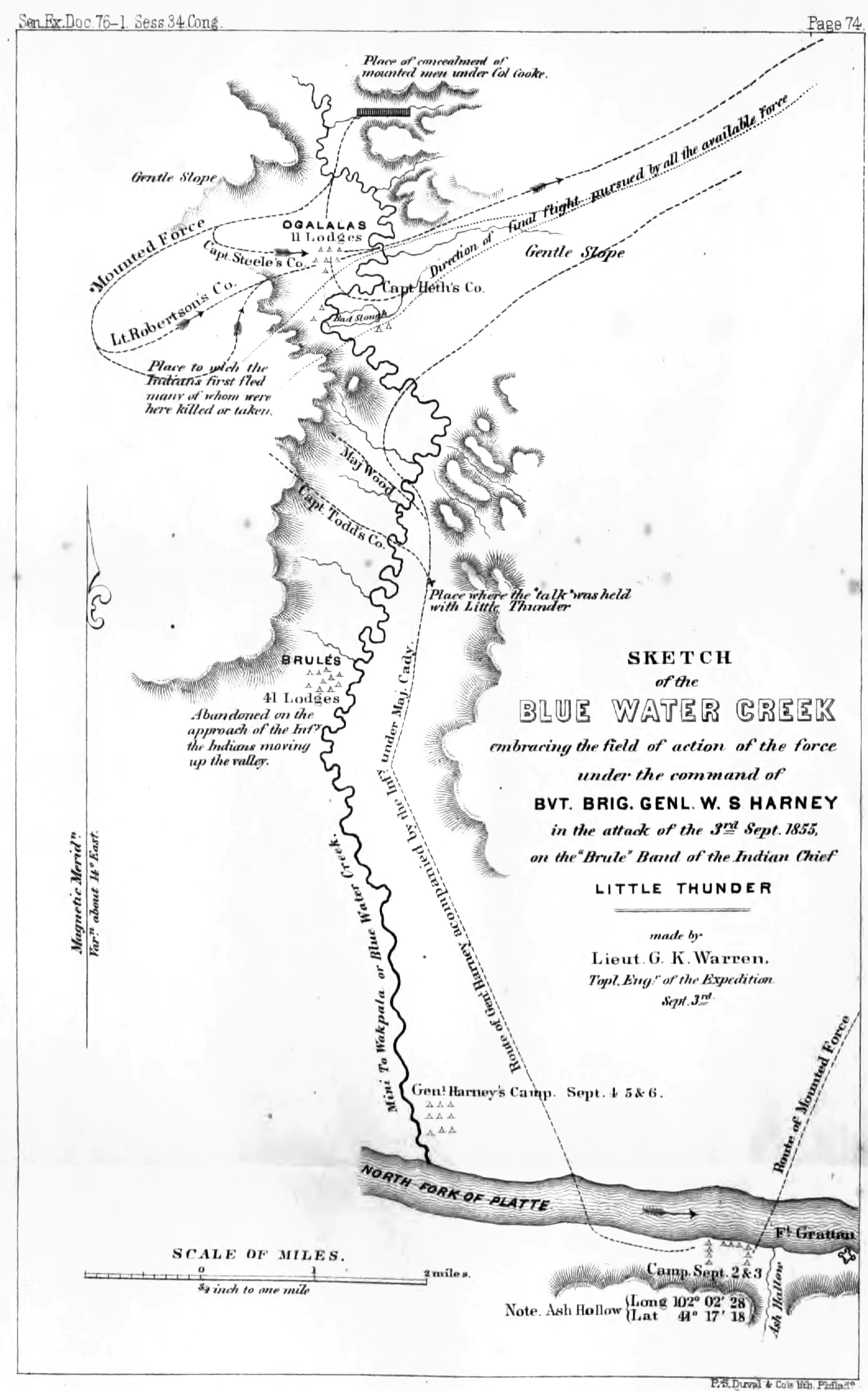
"Sketch of the Blue Water Creek embracing the field of action of the force under the command of Bv. Genl. W.S. Harney in the attack of the 3rd Sept. 1855, on the "Brule" Band of the Indian Chief Little Thunder."

While the battle was hailed by many newspapers as a heroic victory over the Indians, the New York Times called it a massacre and other critics decried it as "outright butchery," because of the killings of numerous women and children.

The lamentable butcheries of Indians by Harney's command on the Plains have excited the most painful feelings," wrote a New York Times correspondent in an 1855 dispatch from Washington. "The so-called battle was simply a massacre, but whether those Indians were really the same who have cut off emigrant trains with so many circumstances of savage cruelty, or whether it is possible to distinguish between the innocent and the guilty in retaliating these outrages, are points on which we have no reliable information.

Some others claimed that the battle was fought only to justify growth in the American army, which was being encouraged by Secretary of War Jefferson Davis.

== Background ==
=== Grattan “Massacre” ===
The first decisive event that initialized the First Sioux war was catalyzed when a Mormon emigrant lost a cow while traveling with his party on the Oregon Trail; the animal wandered into a Sicangu Lakota camp. A Miniconjou Sioux named High Forehead killed the cow for food. The Mormon farmer reported the cow as stolen to army officers at Fort Laramie.

The fort's commander sent out an inexperienced officer, Lt. John Lawrence Grattan—said to be contemptuous of the Indians—to arrest High Forehead. But under the treaty of 1851, such matters related to livestock and relations with settlers were supposed to be handled by the Indian Agent, who was due to arrive soon. Grattan vowed to take the wanted Indian "at all hazards" and took along 30 men and artillery. He pressed the chief to surrender the Sioux man. One of his soldiers shot the chief, Conquering Bear, in the back and killed him. In the ensuing battle the Sioux killed Grattan and 29 of his men. One soldier survived the fighting but died later in the Fort Laramie hospital.

President Franklin Pierce vowed to avenge the Grattan Massacre, as it was called by the press. The War Department appointed Harney to command, with instructions to "whip the Indians." In the ensuing debate, Grattan was blamed for the fracas in which he and the men under his command were killed.

=== Harney Expedition ===
The Harney expedition finally set out in August 1855. On September 1, 1855, the expedition caught up with a Sioux encampment along the Platte River in a place known as Blue Waters. Harney sent a regiment in a long night flanking maneuver to set up a blocking position against which he would drive the Sioux. The flanking maneuver was led by Lt. Col. Philip St. George Cooke and Capt. Henry Heth.

Harney moved up in the morning to drive the Sioux against Cooke and Heth. He first attempted to parlay with the Sioux chief, Little Thunder, but his demands to hand over the men responsible for the Grattan attack were rebuffed. The Sioux felt justified in having killed Grattan and his men, as they had shot first. During the parlay, several Sioux braves discovered Cooke's men.

== Battle ==
Upon the Sioux discovery of Cooke's men, Harney opened the fight by attacking the Sioux camp. Some of the Sioux took refuge in caves along the river. Harney had his men fire into the caves, where they killed many women and children. A large group of mounted warriors rode toward an escape route away from Cooke's and Harney's forces, but Heth saw them and led his forces to block them.

The warriors broke through Heth's men, but were pursued on horseback by cavalry with Heth in the lead. They had a running fight for about five miles, which lasted several hours. At some point Heth got so far ahead of his men that he was presumed killed in action. His death was reported in newspapers around the country and he later took satisfaction in the obituaries his friends had written. The American forces were victorious, killing 86 Sioux and taking 70 prisoners, mostly women and children. Women and children also accounted for about half of the Sioux deaths.

Among other American participants of the battle was Gouverneur K. Warren. He wrote in his diary about the horror of killing native women and children.. John Buford also fought with the Americans. Both became Union generals during the American Civil War.

Afterward, the army made a wide sweep of the surrounding Sioux country but encountered no further resistance. The Sioux called Harney "The Butcher" for the battle at Blue Water, "the Hornet" for invading their territory, and "the Big Chief Who Swears" for the treaty he forced. Following this battle, there were about ten years of peace between the US and the Sioux. The latter tried to ignore the many emigrants on the Oregon Trail, which passed through their territory. The emigrants took game, plants, and water that the Sioux themselves needed for survival.

== Order of battle ==
=== United States Army ===
Sioux Expedition: Brevet Brig. Gen. William S. Harney

- Topographical Engineer: 2nd Lt. Gouverneur K. Warren
- 2nd U.S. Dragoons: Lt. Col. Philip S. Cooke
  - Company E: 1st Lt. Beverly Robertson
  - Company K: Capt. William Steele
- 6th U.S. Infantry: Maj. Albemarle Cady
  - Company A: Capt. John Blair Smith Todd
  - Company E: Capt. Samuel Woods
  - Company H: 2nd Lt. John McCleary
  - Company I: Capt. Henry W. Wharton
  - Company K: 1st Lt. Robert E. Patterson
- 10th U.S. Infantry, Company E: Capt. Henry Heth
- 4th U.S. Artillery, Company G: Capt. Albion P. Howe

=== Native Americans ===
Sicangu Lakota

- Chief Little Thunder

== Legacy ==
After this battle, one of the expeditions renamed Hinhan Kaga, the highest peak in the sacred Black Hills, as Harney Peak for the commander of the military unit. The Harney expedition however had not come within five miles of it, and the Lakota people had resented this sacred peak being named after a man who had killed so many of their people.

Although the Great Sioux Reservation was established in 1868 under another Treaty of Fort Laramie, which included the territory of West River and preserved the sacred Black Hills for the Lakota, within several years gold was discovered in the hills. The US violated its treaty, taking over the Black Hills and other property to enable European-American development. In 1889 the government broke up the Great Sioux Reservation into five smaller ones, and sold off 9,000,000 acres of former Lakota communal land.

In 2016 the United States Board on Geographic Names renamed Harney Peak as Black Elk Peak.

== See also ==
- List of battles fought in Nebraska
- American Indian wars

== Notes ==
Footnotes

Citations

- Paul, R. Eli, Blue Water Creek and the First Sioux War, 1854-1856
- Swanson, Clifford L., The Sixth United States Infantry Regiment, 1855 to Reconstruction
