= Lewellen, Nebraska =

- Village
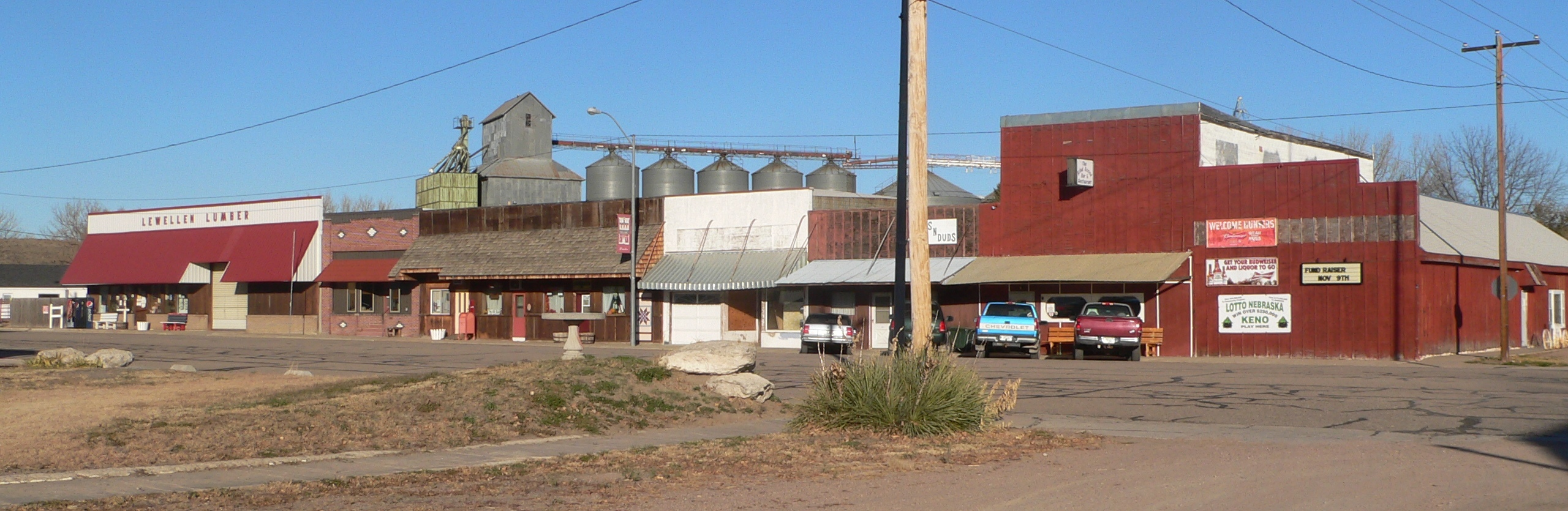
- Main Street

- Location of Lewellen, Nebraska
- Coordinates: 41°19′50″N 102°08′37″W
- Country: United States
- State: Nebraska
- County: Garden

Area
  - Total: 0.37 sq mi (0.96 km^{2})
  - Land: 0.37 sq mi (0.96 km^{2})
  - Water: 0 sq mi (0.00 km^{2})
- Elevation: 3,307 ft (1,008 m)

Population (2020)
  - Total: 175
  - Density: 472.8/sq mi (182.55/km^{2})
- Time zone: UTC-7 (Mountain (MST))
  - Summer (DST): UTC-6 (MDT)
- ZIP code: 69147
- Area code: 308
- FIPS code: 31-26805
- GNIS feature ID: 2398427

Lewellen is a village in Garden County, Nebraska, United States. The population was 175 at the 2020 census.

== Geography ==
According to the United States Census Bureau, the village has a total area of 0.37 square miles (0.96 km^{2}), all land.

== History ==
The site of the September 1855 Battle of Ash Hollow (also called the Battle of Blue Water Creek and Harney Massacre), part of the First Sioux War, is near the modern-day settlement of Lewellen. The United States Army, with 600 troops under the command of William Selby Harney, made a surprise punitive attack on a Brule Sioux encampment led by Chief Little Thunder, in retaliation for the Grattan incident. Army infantry and cavalry killed a total of 86 people, including women and children, and taking another 70 women and children as captives.

Samuel P. Delatour arrived in the area in 1884, founding a ranch at Blue Creek. Lewellen was platted (laid out) in 1906, around the time the railroad was extended to that point. Originally part of the Deuel County, Lewellen became part of Garden County in 1910. It was named for Frank Lewellen, who arrived in the area in 1886 and established a small store and post office. The population by the end of 1919 was about 400.

== Demographics ==
Historical population
Census	Pop.	Note	%±
1930	419		—
1940	532		27.0%
1950	510		−4.1%
1960	411		−19.4%
1970	376		−8.5%
1980	368		−2.1%
1990	307		−16.6%
2000	282		−8.1%
2010	224		−20.6%
2020	175		−21.9%
U.S. Decennial Census

=== 2010 census ===
As of the census of 2010, there were 224 people, 130 households, and 53 families residing in the village. The population density was 605.4 inhabitants per square mile (233.7/km^{2}). There were 200 housing units at an average density of 540.5 per square mile (208.7/km^{2}). The racial makeup of the village was 94.6% White, 0.4% African American, 1.8% Native American, 0.9% from other races, and 2.2% from two or more races. Hispanic or Latino of any race were 4.5% of the population.

There were 130 households, of which 13.1% had children under the age of 18 living with them, 30.0% were married couples living together, 6.9% had a female householder with no husband present, 3.8% had a male householder with no wife present, and 59.2% were non-families. 54.6% of all households were made up of individuals, and 40.7% had someone living alone who was 65 years of age or older. The average household size was 1.72 and the average family size was 2.55.

The median age in the village was 58.4 years. 12.9% of residents were under the age of 18; 5.4% were between the ages of 18 and 24; 14.7% were from 25 to 44; 26.8% were from 45 to 64; and 40.2% were 65 years of age or older. The gender makeup of the village was 49.1% male and 50.9% female.

=== 2000 census ===
As of the census of 2000, there were 282 people, 137 households, and 69 families residing in the village. The population density was 789.5 inhabitants per square mile (304.8/km^{2}). There were 172 housing units at an average density of 481.5 per square mile (185.9/km^{2}). The racial makeup of the village was 93.97% White, 1.06% African American, 0.71% Native American, 1.06% Asian, 1.06% from other races, and 2.13% from two or more races. Hispanic or Latino of any race were 1.77% of the population.

There were 137 households, out of which 14.6% had children under the age of 18 living with them, 39.4% were married couples living together, 8.8% had a female householder with no husband present, and 49.6% were non-families. 44.5% of all households were made up of individuals, and 27.7% had someone living alone who was 65 years of age or older. The average household size was 1.86 and the average family size was 2.55.

In the village, the population was spread out, with 14.5% under the age of 18, 3.9% from 18 to 24, 16.7% from 25 to 44, 27.0% from 45 to 64, and 37.9% who were 65 years of age or older. The median age was 57 years. For every 100 females, there were 79.6 males. For every 100 females age 18 and over, there were 75.9 males.

As of 2000 the median income for a household in the village was $19,191, and the median income for a family was $30,417. Males had a median income of $18,000 versus $15,625 for females. The per capita income for the village was $13,124. About 15.9% of families and 20.1% of the population were below the poverty line, including 34.2% of those under the age of eighteen and 15.4% of those 65 or over.

== See also ==
- Interstate 80 in Nebraska
- Ash Hollow Cave
