= Conquering Bear =

19th century Lakota leader

Matȟó Wayúhi ("Conquering Bear") (c. 1800 – August 19, 1854) was a Brulé Lakota chief who signed the Fort Laramie Treaty (1851). He was killed in 1854 when troops from Fort Laramie entered his encampment to arrest a Sioux who had shot a cow belonging to a Mormon emigrant. All 30 troopers in the army detachment were killed, in what would be called the Grattan massacre or "the Mormon Cow War" according to Army Historian S.L.A. Marshall in his book Crimsoned Prairie. Little Thunder took over as chief after his death.

== Early life and leadership ==
Conquering Bear was born around 1800, a Brulé Lakota Sioux. At the Fort Laramie treaty council in 1851, the Americans demanded the name of the head chief of each tribe who could sign for his people. However, none of the tribes responded with a single name of a leader, so the white men arbitrarily picked chiefs for them. Conquering Bear was chosen to represent the Lakota.

Conquering Bear was basically a man of peace, but was also a proud warrior. The advent of the white men into the Native American ancestral homeland was at first just a nuisance to the original inhabitants. The Indians only wanted to live in peace and tolerated the first white men. Given the encroachment of white settlers with their wagon trains and disease, the Native Americans feared the loss of their way of life and culture. So over and over again they signed the white men's treaties to try to slow the flow of white men onto their land. However, younger warriors within the Sioux were beginning to tire of broken treaties, and it fell to the older leaders such as Conquering Bear to try to hold these young warriors in line. Without leadership and guidance from older warriors they surely would not have survived.

In August, 1854, Conquering Bear and his people were encamped near Fort Laramie in a state of strained peace, adhering to the treaties as they understood them. Supplies and food were to be delivered, as per the treaty agreement, and many different bands of the Sioux had gathered together for this purpose along the North Platte River. It is estimated that some 600 lodges made up the encampment, making a total population of some 4,000 people, 1,200 of which were warriors or of fighting age.

A Mormon wagon train passing through had with it a straggling cow, which fell behind. The Indians had not eaten for quite some time awaiting the promised delayed supplies, and the wayward cow was killed and eaten by a hungry Miniconjou Lakota warrior, High Forehead, and his family who were visiting Conquering Bear's camp. A Mormon settler reported to the army at Fort Laramie that the animal had been stolen by the Native Americans. Lt. John Fleming, the senior officer at the fort, called for Conquering Bear to meet with him at the fort on the matter. Conquering Bear attempted to negotiate compensation for the cow, offering several of his own horses in exchange. The Mormon cow owner refused, demanding $25 in payment instead. Lt. Fleming also demanded that Conquering Bear turn over the guilty warrior. Conquering Bear refused, stating that he had no authority over a brave from another band, and that the warrior was his guest.

Lt. Fleming was swayed by the migrating Mormons, and his second in command, Second Lieutenant John Lawrence Grattan, was eager to take a detachment to arrest High Forehead.

== The massacre ==
With cannon trained on the Indian encampment, the fragile peace was about to shatter. Lt. Grattan ordered Conquering Bear to surrender the Miniconjou Lakota warrior and Conquering Bear again refused. The negotiations went on for quite some time, during which the translator, Auguste, repeatedly mistranslated. Auguste also was quite intoxicated by the time the negotiations began, from drinking along the way, as he feared the encounter. Although Grattan had scolded him before the meeting, he failed to take charge of him and return him to the fort.

Trader James Bordeau, who owned a nearby trading post, was in the encampment at the time, and later relayed the most reliable accounts of what transpired. Bordeau stated that Auguste had taunted the Sioux warriors, calling them women, and was openly boasting that the soldiers would kill them all. Evidently seeing that their situation was not good, and that negotiations were going poorly, Lt. Grattan concluded the proceedings. However, before he reached his column, a shot rang out, fired by a nervous trooper. Conquering Bear had been shot in the back as he walked away, and another shot had been fired by another trooper, hitting another Indian nearby, wounding him. Angered by the shooting, the Lakota rose up and counterattacked the troopers and with the aid of warriors like Spotted Tail, the Lakota quickly killed the entire detachment. Lt. Grattan was one of the first killed. Some 18 troopers broke away for a group of rocks nearby. However, they were cut off by warriors led by Red Cloud, then an up-and-coming war leader, and all the troopers were annihilated.

Out of respect, the Brulé took the dying Conquering Bear out into the vast prairie, far away from white people, to die with dignity. It was there on his prairie that they buried him, laying to rest a leader, warrior, and peacemaker. The incident would spark a response from the US Army, who ignored the fact that Lt. Grattan had instigated the affair. This event would greatly influence the First Sioux War.
