= Ash Hollow State Historical Park =

Park in Nebraska, USA

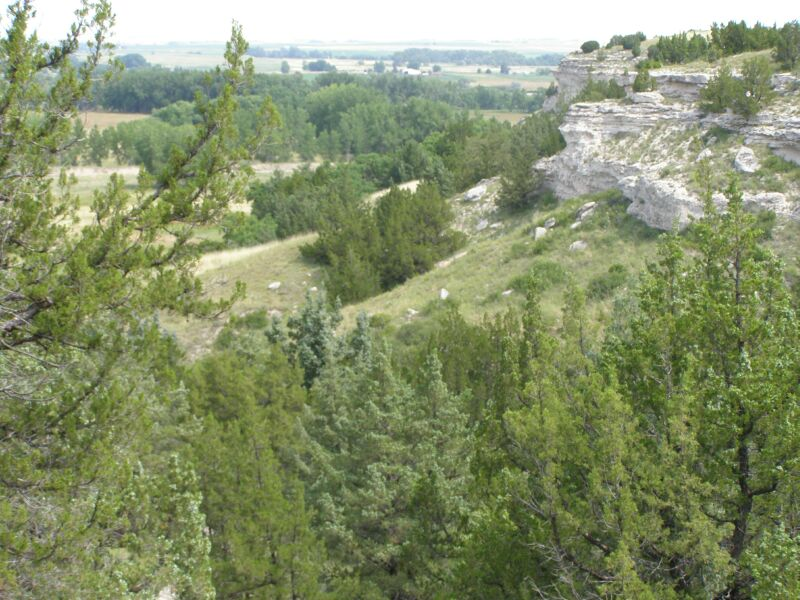

- Location within Nebraska Location within the United States
- Location: Garden County, Nebraska, United States
- Nearest town: Lewellen, Nebraska
- Coordinates: 41°17′53″N 102°07′12″W
- Area: 1,001.03 acres (405.10 ha)
- Elevation: 3,363 ft (1,025 m)
- Designation: Nebraska state historical park
- Established: 1962
- Administrator: Nebraska Game and Parks Commission
- Website: Ash Hollow State Historical Park
- Ash Hollow Cave
- U.S. National Register of Historic Places
- U.S. National Historic Landmark
- Location: Garden County, Nebraska, USA, near Lewellen, Nebraska
- Area: 8.9 acres (3.6 ha)
- NRHP reference No.: 66000445

Significant dates
- Added to NRHP: October 15, 1966
- Designated NHL: July 19, 1964

Ash Hollow State Historical Park is located five miles (8.0 km) south of Lewellen in Garden County, Nebraska. The park comprises two attractions located 2.5 miles (4.0 km) from each other: Ash Hollow Cave and Windlass Hill.

== Ash Hollow cave ==
A spring in the vicinity of Ash Hollow Cave made it an attractive site for periodic human habitation. Archaeological explorations of the cave have revealed that at least four distinct indigenous cultures occupied this area, during a period of more than 1,500 years. These include the Apache from A.D. 1675-1725; the Central Plains tradition from A.D. 900-1450; the Woodland tradition from A.D. 0-1100; and the Late Archaic tradition from 1000 B.C.-A.D. 500. The cave was used as a base camp for hunting and food collecting.

From the early 18th century, this became an area predominantly of Lakota Sioux occupation. The September 1855 Ash Hollow Massacre took place near here. The United States Army, with 600 troops, made a punitive attack on a Brule Sioux encampment, killing a total of 86 people, including women and children, and taking another 70 women and children as captives. The attack on the Lakota Sioux was launched as a result of the Grattan Massacre of 1854 near Ft Laramie, Wyoming.

In 1962, the site was protected as part of a 312-acre Nebraska state park. Ash Hollow Cave was named as a National Historic Landmark in 1964, and listed on the National Register of Historic Places in 1966. The surrounding area was named the Ash Hollow Historic District in 1975. In 1978, a visitor center was built overlooking the canyon.

== Windlass Hill ==
Windlass Hill is located along the Oregon-California Trail. The hill marked the entrance from the high table lands to the south into the Ash Hollow area and the North Platte River valley. Wagon ruts are visible on the hill. The name "Windlass Hill" was not used by the emigrants, and the source of the name is unknown. Emigrants had a hard time going down the hill at a 25-degree angle, going down for about 300 feet.

== See also ==
- Courthouse and Jail Rocks
- List of Registered Historic Places in Nebraska

== Bibliography ==
- Champe, J.L. Ash Hollow Cave, A Study of Stratigraphic Sequence in the Central Great Plains. University of Nebraska Studies, 1946.
