= Albert White Hat =

Native American language activist (1938–2025)

- Natan Tokahe, ("The First One to Charge")

Sicangu Lakota (Sičháŋǧu Oyáte, Brulé) leader

Personal details
- Born: November 18, 1938 Rosebud Indian Reservation, South Dakota, U.S.
- Died: June 13, 2013 (aged 74) Rosebud, South Dakota
- Relations: Hollow Horn Bear (grandfather)
- Children: 7
- Education: St. Francis Jesuit Mission School; Lakota language teacher and scholar at Sinte Gleska University

Albert White Hat (November 18, 1938 – June 13, 2013) was a teacher of the Lakota language, and an activist for Sičháŋǧu Lakȟóta traditional culture. He translated the Lakota language for Hollywood movies, including the 1990 movie Dances with Wolves, and created a modern Lakota orthography and textbook.

== Early life ==
Albert White Hat was born near St. Francis, South Dakota, on the Rosebud Reservation to a traditional family. "His grandfather was Chief Hollow Horn Bear."

He spoke only Lakota as a child. He attended day school in Spring Creek, South Dakota. Unlike many of his peers at St. Francis Jesuit Mission School, who were sent to boarding school at age five, he was not sent until age sixteen.

I grew up with a lot of the older people, listened to the stories. And those stories were inside of me. And I went into a boarding school system, and they killed those stories in that system. I came out of there totally ashamed of who I am, what I am. In the late sixties, I went back to the culture, on my own. I let my hair grow, I started speaking my language. And one of those times, I fasted. I did the vision quest, for five years.

== Teacher of Lakota language and culture ==
After graduating from St. Francis Jesuit Mission School, he held various jobs. White Hat pushed for instruction in the Lakota language in the Todd County, South Dakota school district when his children entered school in the 1960s. Lakota language was not a part of the South Dakota state curriculum at the time. Eventually he learned to create his own lesson plans, and became a Lakota language teacher himself. He became chair of the "Committee for the Preservation of the Lakota Language" in 1982.

White Hat spent twenty-five years teaching the Lakota language at Sinte Gleska University on the Rosebud Indian Reservation, and became the head of the Sinte Gleska Lakota Studies Department." He developed a teaching method that uses extensive examples from the culture of the Brule Lakota, and became known as a scholar of the language. He would teach Lakota culture to "both tribal members and non-Native Americans." He has been quoted as saying, "When we teach a language to a student, we should develop in that student another heart and another mind." He assembled his notes into a book in 1999, Reading and Writing the Lakota Language. He was the "first native Lakota speaker to publish a Lakota textbook and glossary."

He was active in traditional Lakota spiritual life. Rosebud Sioux Tribal President Cyril Scott called him "a great teacher" and "spiritual leader." White Hat spoke at conferences and gatherings, including the 2008 "Planning for Seven Generations" conference in Boulder, Colorado, and was well known on the powwow circuit. A "Lakota Documentaries" video by Don Moccasin (1948–2009) features Albert White Hat speaking about the survival of the Lakota language, in Lakota with English language subtitles.

== Works ==
- White Hat Sr., A. (1999). Reading and Writing the Lakota Language. Salt Lake City: The University of Utah Press; ISBN 9780874805727
- White Hat, A. Sr. (1983). "Lakota ceremonial songs". Mission, South Dakota: Sinte Gleska University.
- White Hat Sr., Albert (2012). "Life's Journey - Zuya: Oral Teachings". Salt Lake City: The University of Utah Press; ISBN 978-160781-177-0 (cloth); ISBN 978-1-60781-184-8 (paperback)

== Awards ==
- Living Indian Treasure Award (2007)
- National Indian Education Association Indian Elder of the Year (2001)
- Outstanding Indian Educator Award (1995)
