= Nellie Star Boy Menard =

American quiltmaker

- Nellie Star Boy Menard, from a 1968 newspaper
- Born: Nellie Zelda Star Boy; June 3, 1910; Rosebud Reservation, South Dakota
- Died: September 23, 2001 (aged 91)
- Occupations: Quiltmaker, educator

Nellie Zelda Star Boy Menard (June 3, 1910 – September 23, 2001) was an American quiltmaker and educator. In 1995, she received a National Heritage Fellowship.

== Early life ==
Nellie Zelda Star Boy was born on the Rosebud Indian Reservation in South Dakota, the daughter of Burton (Bert) Star Boy and Grace Jane Long Warrior. She was a member of the Sicangu Lakota (or Brulé) people. She graduated from the Flandreau Indian School.

== Career ==
Menard worked as an educator at the Flandreau as a young woman. During World War II, she operated the Rosebud Arts and Crafts Store in South Dakota and the Northern Plains Arts and Crafts Store in Browning, Montana. In 1941, she was one of four Native American artists invited to participate in an exhibition at the Museum of Modern Art in New York, where she met First Lady Eleanor Roosevelt. She worked for the Bureau of Indian Affairs in Rapid City for 30 years, assisting Dorothy Field as director of the Rapid City Museum, among other responsibilities.

Menard became known as a community quiltmaker in the Northern Plains style, which involves one large colorful star made of diamond-shaped fabric pieces. She worked with the Michigan Traditional Arts Program at Michigan State University. In 1995, she received a National Heritage Fellowship from the National Endowment for the Arts, and the South Dakota Living Indian Treasure Award.

== Personal life and legacy ==
Star Boy married Clarence Menard. They had children Jack, Martina, D'Arcy, William, and Luther, and raised a number of other children. Her husband died in 1989, and she died in 2001, aged 91 years. Her quilts are in the collections of the National Museum of the American Indian, South Dakota Art Museum, Michigan State University, and the New England Quilt Museum.
