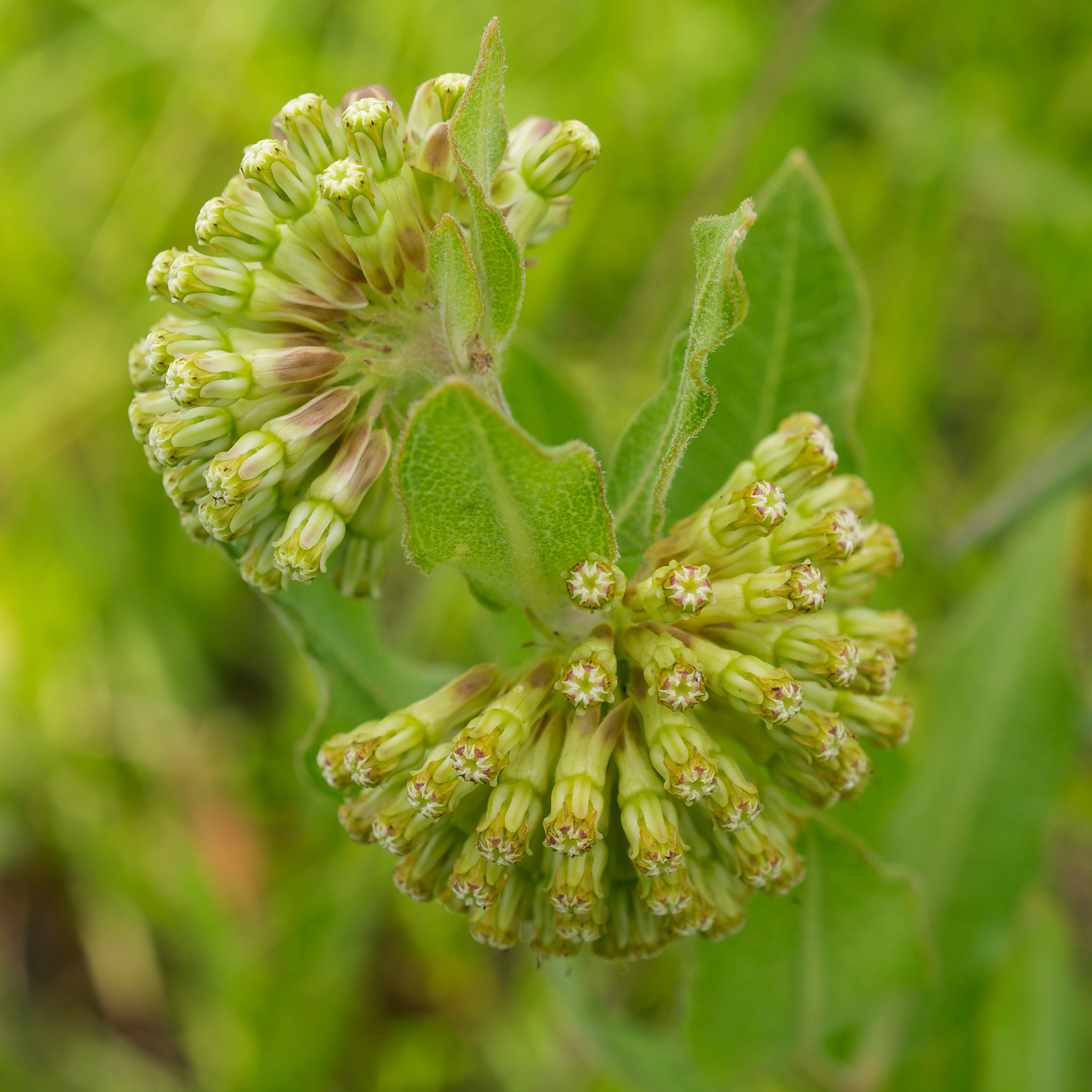

Conservation status
- Secure (NatureServe)

Scientific classification
- Kingdom: Plantae
- Clade: Tracheophytes
- Clade: Angiosperms
- Clade: Eudicots
- Clade: Asterids
- Order: Gentianales
- Family: Apocynaceae
- Genus: Asclepias
- Species: A. viridiflora

Binomial name
- Asclepias viridiflora Raf.

Synonyms
- Acerates ivesii (Britton) Wooton & Standl.; Acerates lanceolata Steud.; Acerates viridiflora (Raf.) Eaton; Acerates viridiflora var. ivesii Britton; Acerates viridiflora var. lanceolata (E.Ives) A.Gray; Asclepias ivesii (Britton) Wooton & Standl.; Asclepias lanceolata Ives; Asclepias viridiflora var. lanceolata (E.Ives) Torr.; Asclepias viridiflora var. linearis (A.Gray) Fernald; Asclepias viridiflora var. pubescentitomentosa Hook.; Gomphocarpus viridiflorus (Raf.) Spreng.; Otanema ovata Raf.; Polyotus heterophyllus Nutt.

= Asclepias viridiflora =

Green milkweed

Species of plant

Asclepias viridiflora; also known as green comet milkweed, green-flower milkweed, and green milkweed; is a species of milkweed (Asclepias). The plant is located in the eastern and central United States, ranging between Connecticut to Georgia and Arizona to Montana, and is also in southern Canada and northern Mexico. The Latin epithet viridiflora translates as "green-flowered".

Asclepias viridiflora is an erect to ascending herb up to 50 cm tall, with greenish-white flowers. The pods lack the warts and tubercules common on other species of Asclepias. It grows in moist to dry shaded roadsides, fields, and prairies.

== Conservation status ==
It is listed as endangered in Florida, as threatened in New York, and as endangered in Connecticut.

== Native American ethnobotany ==
The Blackfoot apply a poultice of chewed roots to swellings, rashes, sore gums of nursing infants, and sore eyes. They also chew the root for sore throats, use the plant to spice soups, and use the fresh roots for food. The Brulé Lakota give pulverized roots to children with diarrhea, and an infusion of the whole plant is taken by mothers to increase their milk.
