= Little Thunder =

Brulé Lakota chief

Wakíŋyaŋ Čík’ala (Little Thunder) (c. 1820–1879) was a Sicangu Lakota chief. He took over as chief of the Sicangu after the death of Conquering Bear by U.S. Army soldiers in a dispute about a wandering Mormon cow in 1854, which had prompted the Grattan Massacre of 30 U.S. Army troops on August 19, 1854, and led to the First Sioux War. The U.S. Army sent 600 troops led by Brevet Gen. William S. Harney to Little Thunder's village on Blue Water Creek, a tributary of the North Platte River in Nebraska, near what is now known as Ash Hollow State Historical Park.

Harney attempted to parlay with the Sioux chief, Little Thunder, but his demands to hand over the men responsible for the Grattan attack were rebuffed. The American forces then attacked during the Battle of Ash Hollow of September 3, 1855, in which approximately 86 Sioux were killed, women and children accounting for about half of the Sioux deaths. Another 70, mostly women and children, were taken prisoners. Little Thunder was wounded and captured during the Battle of Ash Hollow. He was then deposed, although his son would lead a rebellion in 1865, and a teenager who witnessed the massacre, Crazy Horse, would become a war leader two decades later and defeat U.S. Cavalry at the Battle of Little Big Horn in 1876. Little Thunder lived his final years on the Rosebud Indian Reservation of the Dakota Territory.
