= Thomas S. Twiss =

Thomas Sanders Twiss (1802/1803 – 1870) was an American official and academic. He was an Indian agent who negotiated with the Cheyenne on the Upper Platte. He was a professor of mathematics at South Carolina College.

== Early life and education ==
He was born in New York in 1802 or 1803. He attended West Point. After graduating, he taught mathematics at West Point.

== Career ==
He lived in the McCutchen House at South Carolina College from 1835 to 1846. He was on the faculty of South Carolina College until 1846. He worked Nesbitt Manufacturing Company from 1847 to 1850 before joining the Buffalo and New York City Rail Road Company as an engineer.

Twiss was nominated to be an Indian agent for the Upper Platte District by President Franklin Pierce on March 1, 1855. He resigned in 1861.

He was a critic of slavery, but also held slaves when he lived in Georgia prior to joining the faculty of South Carolina College.

== Personal life and death ==
He was married to Elizabeth Sherrill Twiss, who died in 1866.

He lived in poverty for the last years of his life. He died in 1870.
