= John Lawrence Grattan =

US Cavalry officer (1830–1854)

- Born: June 1, 1830; Corinth, Vermont
- Died: August 19, 1854 (aged 24); Near Fort Laramie, Wyoming
- Burial place: Fort Leavenworth, Kansas
- Military career
- Allegiance: United States of America
- Branch: United States Army
- Service years: 1853–1854
- Rank: Second Lieutenant
- Unit: 6th Infantry Regiment
- Conflicts: American Indian Wars

John Lawrence Grattan (June 1, 1830 – August 19, 1854) was a mid-19th-century U.S. Army officer, whose poor judgement and inexperience led to the Grattan massacre, which was a major instigator for the First Sioux War.

== Early life and military career ==
Grattan was born in Corinth, Vermont on 1 June 1830. His mother, Sarah Rogers, died when he was only five. His father, Peter Grattan, relocated with his young son, John, and daughter, Mary, to Lisbon, New Hampshire where he worked as a wheelwright.

John L. Grattan entered West Point in 1849, but did very poorly in his courses. Out of a class of 63, he finished 51st in French, and 43rd in Engineering, failing mathematics altogether. Due to this, he was held back for a year. He applied himself the following year, finishing in the top third of his class for that year, only to again fall to the bottom third by his final year.

In 1853, he graduated 36th out of a class of 55. Fellow graduates that year were James B. McPherson, Philip Sheridan, John Bell Hood, and John Schofield, all of whom went on to fame during the American Civil War. Grattan, however, would achieve what fame he did receive due to a mistake during his very first command, which ended in his death and the death of 29 soldiers under his command as well as a civilian interpreter.

== Military service on the frontier ==
After graduation, Grattan was appointed a second lieutenant by brevet in the 6th Infantry. Given the customary three months leave following his graduation, Grattan was to have reported to Company G, 6th Infantry, at Fort Laramie, by October 1, 1853, but he arrived on November 16. Within his first month, according to recorded reports from Post Surgeon Charles Page, Grattan received a reputation as being brash and boastful, while also giving off the impression that he was proud to serve in the army. The most disturbing trait, according to later accounts given by Page, was that Grattan displayed a disdain and dislike of the American Indians, despite having had no contact with them whatsoever up to that point, save seeing or meeting any who were in or around the post.

In July and August, 1854, new settlers moving west were plagued by raids from the Cheyenne, and calling on the army to do something about it. After one mid-August raid, settlers and traders encountered the Cheyenne warriors and pursued them, only to give up the chase before engaging. When Grattan was told this, he ridiculed the pursuers for fearing a confrontation with the Cheyenne. The settlers and traders who were pursuing the band of warriors had enough experience to recognize that the Cheyenne seemed to be baiting them into a possible ambush. Thus they stopped their pursuit and reported the incident to Fort Laramie. During his ridicule of the men, Grattan stated that with 10 men he could defeat the entire Cheyenne nation.

Around this same time, in expectation that treaty annuities were soon to come, elements of the Lakota and Oglala had camped near the fort. Collectively the Sioux villages spread across a three-mile area along the North Platte River. In the Native American camps, seasoned chiefs were struggling to control the more impatient young warriors, who were angered by the sight of their people starving, and over former broken promises by the whites. This would be compounded by the fact that Fort Laramie was at the time under the command of two young inexperienced officers, with one being a brash and totally untested young Second Lieutenant.

== Tensions build ==
The Indians were starving, and had been hungry for weeks awaiting the arrival of the annuities. By most reports, a Mormon wagon train passing through had lost a straggling and lame cow. With any game being scarce in the area, the Sioux butchered the cow, and feasted on it. On August 18, 1854, the wagon train reached Fort Laramie, where the owner of the cow complained to Lt. Hugh Fleming that his cow had been stolen by the Indians. Reports vary, with the most reliable accounts stating that the owner noticed that the cow was missing, and returned to find that the Indians had butchered it. Lt. Fleming sent for Conquering Bear, the leader of the band where the cow had been butchered. Although Conquering Bear did not agree with all of the details in the Treaty of 1851, he did understand quite clearly that restitution was required for any property stolen from white settlers.

Conquering Bear also knew full well that, by the terms of the treaty, this was not a military matter, a fact that Lt. Fleming was not aware of. In reality, a matter of this sort should have been handled by John Whitfield, the Indian Agent assigned to the area, who was due to arrive within the week. Lt. Fleming wanted the brave who had initially killed the cow, High Forehead, arrested and delivered to the fort.

By later Indian accounts, Conquering Bear entered the fort feeling confident that it was a minor affair and would be settled easily enough. As negotiations went on, it was quickly evident that Lt. Fleming's inexperience led to him being easily swayed and influenced, in this case by the civilians involved. Conquering Bear offered the owner the choice of any of his 60 horses, but the owner refused. The owner of the cow instead wanted $25 in cash, equivalent to $900 in 2025.

By this time, Lt. Grattan had joined the negotiations, and immediately taken the side of the cow owner. Finding himself encouraged by Lt. Grattan's support, the formerly uncertain Lt. Fleming now demanded that High Forehead be arrested and brought to the fort. Alarmed, Conquering Bear attempted to explain that he had no authority over High Forehead, who was of another tribe and who was a guest in his village, therefore making it impossible by his tribe's traditions to arrest him. Conquering Bear left the fort, riding back to the village. He had offered to show the soldiers the lodge of High Forehead, but insisted that neither he nor any of his people would assist in his arrest. Lt. Fleming was known to the Sioux, and had previously led an attack on a village, with minor casualties, but nonetheless enough to give Lt. Fleming confidence in dealing with the Indians.

Lt. Fleming led a detail into the village, but getting the feeling that an arrest would most certainly result in violence, Fleming initially made a solid decision, that being to await the arrival of the Indian Agent, John Whitfield. However, Lt. Grattan pressed Fleming when the latter returned to the fort, pushing him to allow Grattan to lead a force into the Indian village to arrest High Forehead. The next morning, Lt. Grattan was authorized by Lt. Fleming to depart with a force of 22 troopers. Another poor decision on the part of Fleming, as the entire post was made up of only 75 soldiers, and that day 32 were away on wood and hay cutting details.

Once Lt. Grattan left the fort, Fleming was left with only a small number of soldiers. To make matters worse, Lt. Grattan took 29 troopers, 7 more than Fleming had authorized, in addition to two artillery pieces. Sergeant Leodegar Schnyder, would later say he did not volunteer due to his belief that the two inexperienced officers were making bad decisions, and thus, not being ordered to go, he did not. Most of the soldiers accompanying Lt. Grattan were experienced soldiers. The detachment's translator was Luciene Auguste, who spoke the Dakota language poorly, and who was despised by the Sioux. Lt. Grattan, having no prior experience with the Indians whatsoever, was now leading his small force into a major Sioux encampment, which was filled with young warriors tired of what they considered to be lies told by the white government.

== Grattan Battle ==
Auguste was drinking heavily while en route to the encampment, and Lt. Grattan either did not notice or ignored this. By the time the party reached the encampment, Auguste was completely intoxicated. Lt. Grattan noticed this intoxication after their arrival, angrily taking Auguste's bottle and smashing it against his saddle. Had he ordered Auguste back to the fort at that point, it might possibly have altered the events that followed. For the first time Lt. Grattan saw the size of the village into which he had led his men. The village was made up of some 600 Sioux lodges, with a population of some 4,800 people, of which approximately 1,200 were warriors. By this point, some of the more experienced soldiers were voicing quietly that their small force was not in a good position, and leaving would be advisable.

Halfway into the village, now seeing painted warriors who were openly hostile and riding aggressively around the column, Lt. Grattan stopped, and asked the advice of James Bordeau, an experienced trader who had lived on the frontier for many years. Bordeau had been at Fort Laramie when the earlier incident happened with Conquering Bear, and was in the village trading when the army column entered. He was not aware that the army intended on arresting High Forehead.

Bordeau would later state that Auguste, the translator, was openly intoxicated and yelling to the Indians that the army had come to kill them all. Lt. Grattan spoke with Bordeau and asked how this matter could more easily be solved without bloodshed, to which Bordeau responded that Grattan should speak again with Conquering Bear, and let him handle the matter in his own time.

At this point the translator Auguste was calling the Sioux warriors women, and was riding wildly around on his horse saying they had come to fight, not to talk. Lt. Grattan led his force deeper into the village, and located High Forehead, who upon being ordered to surrender High Forehead, dared Lt. Grattan to come fight him man to man, and that he would die rather than surrender. This annoyed Grattan greatly, who now turned to negotiating with Conquering Bear.

The Indian leader requested that Lt. Grattan have soldiers go and retrieve James Bordeau to translate, as Auguste would not translate correctly, and, he was intoxicated. One of the Indian leaders, Man-Afraid-Of-His-Horse, went and retrieved Bordeau. Before Bordeau arrived, the tension between Lt. Grattan and Conquering Bear had increased. Bordeau quickly realized before he reached the meeting spot that violence was obviously unavoidable, and he turned back.

At some point, Lt. Grattan ordered his two artillery pieces turned to point at the village. Immediately hundreds of warriors surrounded the soldiers. An up-and-coming young warrior at the time, Red Cloud led a group of warriors around to flank the soldiers. Bordeau again decided to go and see what he could do to halt any violence. When he reached about twenty five yards distance from the meeting spot, he observed the flanking movements of the Indians, and could hear the heated exchange between Lt. Grattan and Conquering Bear, he again retreated. Bordeau returned to his trading post, where he told all traders inside to load their weapons, as a fight was coming.

Lt. Grattan concluded his meeting, and was apparently intending on departing, as Conquering Bear turned and walked toward his lodge. Before Lt. Grattan reached his detachment, a nervous soldier fired into some approaching warriors, wounding one man. Grattan initially moved to his artillery. His gun crews were the first to fall, being hit by a volley of arrows. Lt. Grattan died near to the artillery. His force, now down to 18 men, banded together and attempted to reach a rocky area where they could make a stand. They had to cross an open prairie before reaching that point, and encountered Red Cloud's warriors in between. The remainder of Grattan's force were quickly overwhelmed and annihilated.
