= Sicangu =

Traditional tribal grouping within the Lakota people

Siċaƞġu / Sičháŋǧu / Sičhą́ǧu Brulé
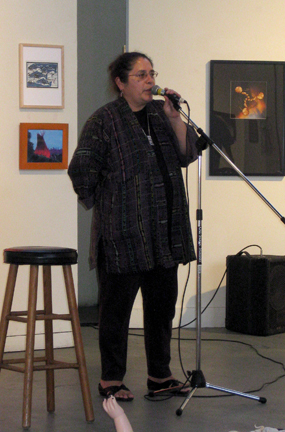
- Janeen Antoine (Sičhą́ǧu Lakóta), curator and educator

Regions with significant populations
- United States (South Dakota)

Languages
- Lakȟóta, English

Religion
- traditional tribal religion, Sun Dance, Native American Church, Christianity

Related ethnic groups
- other Lakȟóta people

The Sicangu (also spelled Siċaƞġu or Sičháŋǧu or Sičhą́ǧu) are one of the seven oyates, nations or council fires, of Lakota people, an Indigenous people of the Northern Plains. Today, many Sicangu people are enrolled citizens of the Rosebud Sioux Tribe of the Rosebud Indian Reservation and Lower Brule Sioux Tribe of the Lower Brule Reservation in South Dakota.

== Distribution ==
Many Sičhą́ǧu people live on the Rosebud Indian Reservation in southwestern South Dakota and are enrolled in the federally recognized Rosebud Sioux Tribe, also known in Lakȟóta as the Sičhą́ǧu Oyáte. A smaller population lives on the Lower Brule Indian Reservation, on the west bank of the Missouri River in central South Dakota, and on the Pine Ridge Indian Reservation, also in South Dakota, directly west of the Rosebud Indian Reservation. The different federally recognized tribes are politically independent of each other.

== Name ==
The Sicangu Lakota are known as Sičhą́ǧu Oyáte in Lakȟóta, which translates to "Burnt Thighs Nation". Learning the meaning of their name, the French called them the Brûlé, also Brulé, meaning "burnt". The name may have derived from an incident where they were fleeing through a grass fire on the plains that occurred on the Coteau des Prairies while migrating from the Mississippi to the Missouri in 1762-1763 according to Brown Hat’s winter count.

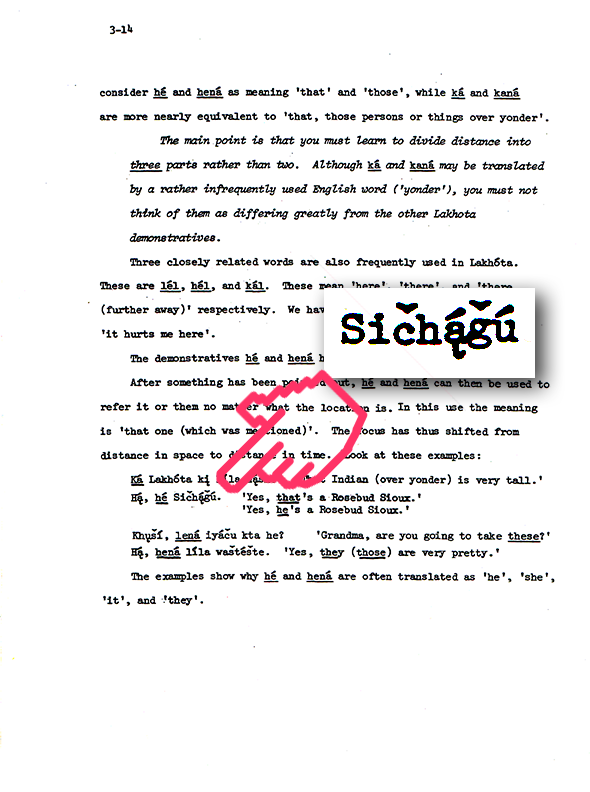
Sičhą́ǧu on page 3.-14 of Beginning Lakhóta, 1976.

The term "Sičhą́ǧu" appears on page 3-14 of Beginning Lakhóta, using the Colorado University spelling.

"Ká Lakȟóta kį líla hą́ske. 'That Indian (over yonder) is very tall.'"
"Hą, hé Sičhą́ǧú. 'Yes, that's a Rosebud Sioux.'"

It appears to be a compound word of the Thítȟųwą Lakȟóta dialect, meaning "burned thigh".

The Rosebud Sioux Tribe official 2012 orthography, based on Albert White Hat’s orthography, uses the spelling Siċaƞġu (also sometimes Siċaŋġu). The Lakota Language Consortium orthography used in New Lakota Dictionary uses the spelling Sičháŋǧu.

== Historic Sicangu Thiyóšpaye or bands ==
Together with the Oglála Lakȟóta, who are mostly based at the Pine Ridge Indian Reservation, they are often called Southern Lakȟóta.

They were divided in three great regional tribal divisions:

- Lower Brulé (Khúl Wičháša Oyáte, "Lowland People", lived along the White River to its mouth at the Missouri River (Mnišóše) as well in the Missouri River Valley in South Dakota; some ventured south to the Niobrara River).
- Upper Brulé (Ȟeyáta Wičháša Oyáte - ″Highland People″, ventured further south and west onto the Plains along the Platte River between the North and South Platte River in Nebraska in the search for buffalo. The allied Southern Cheyenne and Southern Arapaho accepted the Upper Brulé into their alliance, as well as upon their claimed lands along the Loup River - the former center of the Skidi Pawnee. They went south to plunder enemy Pawnee and Arikara camps, and were therefore also known as Kheyatawhichasha, or ″People away from the (Missouri) River″)
- (Upper) Brulé of the Platte River (a splinter group of the Upper Brulé and the southernmost Sicangu group, generally along the South Platte River in Colorado, with hunting bands south to the Republican River - home to the enemy Kithehaki / Kitkehaxki of the South Bands Pawnee, also known as: Kheyatawhichasha - ″People away from the (Missouri) River″)

According to the Kul Wicasa (Lower Brulé) Medicine Bull (Tatȟą́ka Wakȟą́), the people were decentralized and identified with the following thiyóšpaye, or extended family groups, who collected in various local thiwáhe (English: camps or family circles):

- Apewantanka
- Chokatowela
- Ihanktonwan
- Iyakoza (Note: Also spelled A-a-ko-za or Aakoza.)
- Kanghi yuha
- Nakhpakhpa
- Pispiza wichasha
- Shawala
- Shiyolanka
- Wacheunpa
- Waleghaunwohan

== Ethnobotany ==
The Sicangu give pulverized roots of green comet milkweed to children with diarrhea. Nursing mothers take an infusion of the whole plant to increase their milk flow. They brew the leaves of prairie redroot into a tea.

== Notable Sicangu ==
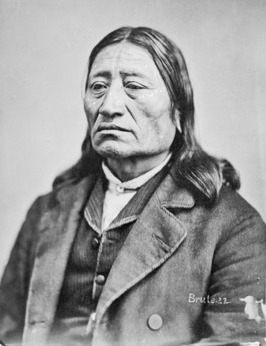
Chief Iron Nation

- Bob Barker, game show host of Truth or Consequences and The Price is Right
- Pappy Boyington, WWII Marine Corps fighter ace and Medal of Honor recipient
- Mary Brave Bird, author
- Leonard Crow Dog, spiritual leader, American Indian Movement activist
- Paul Eagle Star, performer with Buffalo Bill's Wild West Show
- Hollow Horn Bear, chief
- Iron Nation, chief
- Iron Shell, chief
- Little Thunder, chief
- Lone Feather, Republican public administrator from South Dakota, first Lakota elected to the U.S. House of Representatives
- Arnold Short Bull, a Sicangu holy man, who brought the Ghost Dance to the Lakota in South Dakota in 1890
- Eddie Spears, actor
- Michael Spears, actor
- Spotted Tail or "Sinte Gleska", 19th-century chief
- Nellie Star Boy Menard, quiltmaker
- Moses Stranger Horse, artist
- Two Strike, chief
- Frank Waln, rapper
- Albert White Hat, Lakota language teacher
- Dyani White Hawk, contemporary painter and former curator of All My Relations Arts gallery
- Rosebud Yellow Robe, folklorist, educator and author

== See also ==
- Bois-Brûlés
