= List of higher education associations and organizations in the United States =

There are many higher education associations, organizations, and alliances in the United States of America. These groups are relevant to the structure of higher education in the United States. One way the associations distinguish themselves is if their members are presidents of institutions or not.

These organizations for post-secondary education have a common purpose and mission for advocacy in numerous areas of both institutional management and the general public interest. The organizations have specific purpose for issues from faculty unionization to public policy research and service to institutions. Most are focused on the organization and governance of higher and tertiary education, but some are involved in service and research at all levels of education.

For information about accrediting bodies for higher education, see Higher education accreditation in the United States.

== Notable organizations by category ==
Umbrella organizations
- American Association of Colleges and Universities
- American Association of Community Colleges
- American Association of State Colleges and Universities
- American Council of Education
- American Council of Learned Societies
- Association of American Universities
- Association of Public and Land-grant Universities
- National Association of Independent Colleges and Universities

Compacts

- Education Commission of the States
- Midwestern Higher Education Compact
- New England Board of Higher Education
- Southern Regional Education Board
- Western Interstate Commission for Higher Education
Faculty union
- American Association of University Professors
- American Federation of Teachers
- National Education Association

Governing boards and legal

- Association of Community College Trustees
- Association of Governing Boards of Universities and Colleges
- National Association of College and University Attorneys
Research
- American Educational Research Association
- Center for the Study of Higher Education
- Educational Policy Institute
- Higher Education Research Institute
- Institute for Higher Education Policy
- National Center for Education Statistics
- National Center for the Study of Collective Bargaining in Higher Education

== Umbrella organizations ==
=== Association of American Colleges and Universities (AAC&U) ===
Founded in 1915, the Association of American Colleges and Universities (AAC&U) is a non-profit association of nearly 1,300 member institutions, including accredited public and private colleges, community colleges, research universities, and comprehensive universities of every type and size.

AAC&U is a leading national association concerned with the quality, vitality, and public standing of undergraduate liberal-arts education. AAC&U works to reinforce the commitment to liberal education at both the national and the local level and to help individual colleges and universities keep the quality of student learning at the core of their work as they evolve to meet new economic and social challenges.

=== American Association of Community Colleges (AACC) ===
Founded in 1920, the American Association of Community Colleges (AACC), headquartered in the National Center for Higher Education in Washington, D.C., is the primary advocacy organization for community colleges at the national level and works closely with directors of state offices to inform and affect state policy.

AACC is member of "The Group of The Six"

The association has ongoing interaction with key federal departments and agencies including the U.S. departments of Labor, Education, Energy, Homeland Security, and Commerce and the National Science Foundation.

AACC represents almost 1,200 community colleges from the U.S. in which there are enrolled more than 11 million students.

=== American Association of State Colleges and Universities (AASCU) ===
Founded in 1951, the American Association of State Colleges and Universities (AASCU) is an organization of state-supported colleges and universities that offer degree programs leading to bachelor's, master's or doctoral degrees. AASCU grew out of the Association of Teacher Education Institutions that had been organized in 1951 to serve public comprehensive institutions most of them having begun as single purpose institutions, most of them normal schools.

Members of AASCU work to extend higher education to all citizens, including those who have been traditionally underrepresented on college campuses. By Delivering America’s Promise, these institutions fulfill the expectations of a public university by working for the public good through education and engagement, thereby improving the lives of people in their community, their region and their state. The American Association of State Colleges and Universities represents more than 400 public colleges, universities and systems of higher education throughout the United States and its territories.

=== American Council on Education (ACE) ===
Established in 1918, the American Council on Education (ACE) is a United States organization comprising over 1,800 accredited, degree-granting colleges and universities and higher education-related associations, organizations, and corporations.

ACE is being known as the "umbrella" higher education association in the United States. Based in Washington, D.C. at the National Center for Higher Education, ACE convenes the "Group of The Six" which brings together the six most important presidentially based higher education associations in the United States, in order to foster collaboration, to monitor and influence federal policy and to collaborate on issues of common interest.

The associations belonging to the "Group of The Six" are: ACE, AACC, APLU, AASCU, AAU and NAICU.

=== Association of American Universities (AAU) ===
Founded in 1900, the Association of American Universities (AAU) is an organization of 71 leading research universities devoted to maintaining a strong system of academic research and education. It consists of sixty-nine universities in the United States (both public and private) and two universities in Canada.

The primary purpose of the AAU is to provide a forum for the development and implementation of institutional and national policies, in order to promote strong programs in academic research and scholarship and undergraduate, graduate, and professional education. AAU is headquartered in Washington, D.C.

=== Association of Public and Land-grant Universities (APLU) ===
Founded in 1886, the Association of Public and Land-grant Universities (APLU) is a non-profit association of 218 public research universities, land-grant institutions, and state university systems with member campuses in all 50 states, U.S. territories and the District of Columbia.

The APLU membership includes 76 land-grant institutions, of which 18 are the historically black institutions and the interests of the nation’s 33 American Indian land-grant colleges through the membership of the American Indian Higher Education Consortium (AIHEC). APLU institutions enroll more than 3.5 million undergraduate students and 1.1 million graduate students, employ more than 645,000 faculty members, and conduct nearly two-thirds of all federally funded academic research, totaling more than $34 billion annually.

=== National Association of Independent Colleges and Universities (NAICU) ===
Founded in 1976, the National Association of Independent Colleges and Universities (NAICU) is an organization of private US colleges and universities. NAICU has over 1,000 independent higher education institutions.

=== American Indian Higher Education Consortium (AIHEC) ===
The American Indian Higher Education Consortium (AIHEC) was established in 1972 to represent the interests of the newly developed tribal colleges and universities, which are controlled and operated by American Indian nations. The four founders were Gerald One Feather of the Oglala Sioux Community College (now Oglala Lakota College), David Reisling of D–Q University, Pat Locke of the Western Interstate Commission for Higher Education (WICHE), and Helen Schierbeck of the United States Office of Education (USOE). They organized the initial meeting and brought together all who wanted to form such a national organization. One of the most significant achievements of AIHEC was to work with the United States Congress to authorize in 1994 land-grant status to 29 tribal colleges, achieved in October 1994 under the Elementary and Secondary Education Reauthorization Act.

As a result, AIHEC is eligible to have a representative participate in the National Association of State Universities and Land-Grant Colleges' Council of Presidents. With administrative headquarters in Alexandria, Virginia. AIHEC's membership consists of 36 tribal colleges and universities (TCUs) in the United States and one in Canada, whose first tribal college achieved independent status in 1995. The presidents jointly govern AIHEC from the member institutions. The organization offers technical assistance to its member colleges and develops institutions, and leads efforts to promote the Tribal College Movement.

In 1989, AIHEC established the American Indian College Fund (AICF) to raise scholarship funds for American Indian students at qualified tribal colleges and universities.

=== University Professional and Continuing Education Association (UPCEA) ===
Founded in 1915, University Professional and Continuing Education Association (UPCEA) is a higher education association non-profit which focuses on professional, continuing, and online higher education. UPCEA serves more than 400 institutions, including most of the leading public and private colleges and universities in North America. For over 100 years, the association has served its members with conferences and specialty seminars, research and bench marking information, professional networking opportunities and timely publications. The major organizational structure defers to the Networks, or communities of practice, and Regions, location-based groups. Based in Washington, D.C., UPCEA also builds greater awareness of the vital link between contemporary learners and public policy issues.

== Compacts ==
=== Education Commission of the States ===
Created in 1965, the Education Commission of the States is an interstate organization for information exchange to improve public education. The website offers a wide range of resources from publications to general news, projects and institutes. The organization has collaborated with the National Center for Public Policy and Higher Education and the National Center for Higher Education Management systems to create the National Collaborative for Postsecondary Education Policy. The collaborative focuses on meeting the needs of the students of home states. Findings from the collaboration emphasize state leadership and citizen groups to inform public opinion.

=== Western Interstate Commission for Higher Education ===
The Western Interstate Commission for Higher Education (WICHE) was created in 1951 and is an interstate organization that promote collaboration between state governments and also provides data and policy analysis for educators, policymakers and governors of 15 states in the Western part of the United States.

== Faculty union ==
=== American Association of University Professors ===
The American Association of University Professors (AAUP) stated purpose is "to define fundamental professional values and standards for higher education", and "to ensure higher education's contribution to the common good". Established in 1915, the organization began at a time when there were concerns over academic freedom. Also an era of laissez-faire economics, there was increased need for labor unionizing. University professors organized themselves to ensure their rights and freedoms in academic scholarship, ironically catalyst from a debate over economics. The organization advocates for the protection of academic freedom and promotes shared democratic governance for postsecondary education in the United States.

=== American Federation of Teachers ===
The American Federation of Teachers (AFT) was founded in 1916 to promote the professional interests of teachers, including their economic and social interests through affiliation with international unionization. The organization hosts the Quality Education Standards in Teaching (QuEST) conference.

=== National Education Association ===
The National Education Association (NEA) offers resources and tools for research in education. The NEA Research Center provides detailed studies on issues related to governance in Higher Education. The research includes a variety of topics from the changing trends in European Higher Education and its potential effects for Europe and the United States to information on Community College faculty. The NEA also features a number of publications, including Update, The Almanac, Thought and Action, Advocate Online (each of which are available for visitors online), and several publications focused on academic justice and excellence.

== Governing boards and legal ==
=== Association of Community College Trustees ===
The Association of Community College Trustees (ACCT) notes that it is the only national association organized specifically to meet the needs of community college governing boards in the United States. The organization represents more than 6,500 elected and appointed trustees who govern over 1,200 community, technical and junior colleges in the United States. The organization hosts the annual National Community College Leadership Congress and the National Community College Legislative Summit delivered by experts on governance and public policy. The association hosts governance leadership institutes and provides other board leadership services for community college trustees, as well as advocates for community colleges at the federal level in Washington, D.C. ACCT's is the publisher of numerous books and booklets to promote effective community college governance, all of which are available for purchase online.

=== Association of Governing Boards of Universities and Colleges (AGB) ===
Founded in 1921, the Association of Governing Boards of Universities and Colleges (AGB) is a non-profit association of more than 1,250 member institutions: colleges and universities of all types (independent and public, four-year and two-year, and general and specialized) plus public college and university foundation boards. AGB notes that it is the only national association organized to meet the needs of governing boards for higher education in the United States. The organization serves the trustees and regents, professional staff members, senior level administrators and associated CEOs of university governing boards with purpose to “foster cooperation among all education stakeholders” (AGB, 2006). The organization hosts conferences and workshops delivered by expert practitioners in higher education. The association offers consulting services. The AGB is also the host of the Zwingle Library and Resource Center and the Richard T. Ingram Center for Public Trusteeship and Governance.

=== National Association of College and University Attorneys ===
The purpose of the National Association of College and University Attorneys (NACUA) is to educate and assist administrators and attorneys of legal issues in higher education. The association was founded in the 1960s by a group of legal specialists that provided counsel to colleges and universities (the first group of attorneys of such kind in the United States). The website states its mission “to advance the effective practice of higher education attorneys for the benefit of the colleges and universities they serve” (NACUA, 2006). The NACUA offers news from its own bulletin, service for legal reference, educational programs (workshops, seminars and learning materials), and publications related to legal issues in higher education. The publications consist of pamphlets, brochures, a scholarly journal, and a number of academic books that are available for mail order and purchase online.

=== State Higher Education Executive Officers Association ===
Established in 1954, the mission of the State Higher Education Executive Officers Association (SHEEO) is to "equip ... state higher education executive officers and their staffs with the tools to effectively advance the value of higher education; promoting public policies and academic practices that enable Americans to achieve success in the 21st century; and serving as an advocate for state higher education leadership." SHEEO focuses on professional development, research and analysis of postsecondary issues at the state level, advocacy for the value of higher education at the state and national levels, and "advoca[cy] ... for postsecondary infrastructure and initiatives that bolster equitable support and opportunities for student success and workforce alignment."

== Research ==
=== American Educational Research Association (AERA) ===
Founded in 1916, American Educational Research Association (AERA) is a professional organization representing educational researchers in the United States and around the world. Headquartered in Washington, D.C., AERA strives to advance knowledge about education and promote the use of research to improve education and the public good.

In addition to publishing six education research journals, AERA is involved in education policy initiatives, professional development, and its annual meeting attended by over 12,000 members of the global education research community.

=== Educational Policy Institute ===
The Educational Policy Institute is a non-profit, non-partisan research organization dedicated to the study of educational opportunity. Based in Virginia Beach, Virginia, EPI also has offices in Toronto, Canada, and Melbourne, Australia. EPI conducts policy analysis, program evaluation, and professional development in the K-12, postsecondary, and workforce areas. EPI conducts several conferences and workshops in the US, Canada and abroad each year.

=== Higher Education Research Institute ===
The Higher Education Research Institute is an organization at the UCLA Graduate School of Education and Information Studies (GSE&IS). The institute serves as a center for interdisciplinary research in postsecondary education. Research and publications are available online and for purchase. The institute does provide detailed summaries of the research that is available for purchase.

=== Institute for Higher Education Policy ===
The Institute for Higher Education Policy (IHEP) is an independent, nonprofit organization that is dedicated to access and success in postsecondary education around the world. Established in 1993, the Washington, D.C.-based organization uses unique research and innovative programs to inform key decision makers who shape public policy and support economic and social development.

==== Presidents ====
- Jamie Merisotis (1993–2007)
- Thomas D. Parker (2008; interim)
- Michelle Asha Cooper (2008–2021)
- Mamie Voight (since 2021)

=== National Center of Education Statistics ===
Through the US Department of Education, the National Center for Education Statistics (NCES) provides statistics for both K–12 and Higher Education.

=== National Center for the Study of Collective Bargaining in Higher Education ===
The National Center for the Study of Collective Bargaining in Higher Education and the Professions (NCSCBHEP) was established in 1972. The center is supported by the Hunter College at the City University of New York. The NCSCBHEP is an impartial and non-profit educational institution and serves as a clearinghouse forum for those engaged in the study and practice of collective bargaining. The center's services include an annual conference, workshops and publications. Publications from the NCSCBHEP include texts on the proceedings of the annual conference and commentary from the national executive, a directory of statistical analysis on collective bargaining, a bibliography of literature reviews, and monographs contributed by scholars.

== See also ==
- Educational research
- Governance in higher education
- Higher education
