= Hamid Shirvani =

American academic (born 1950)

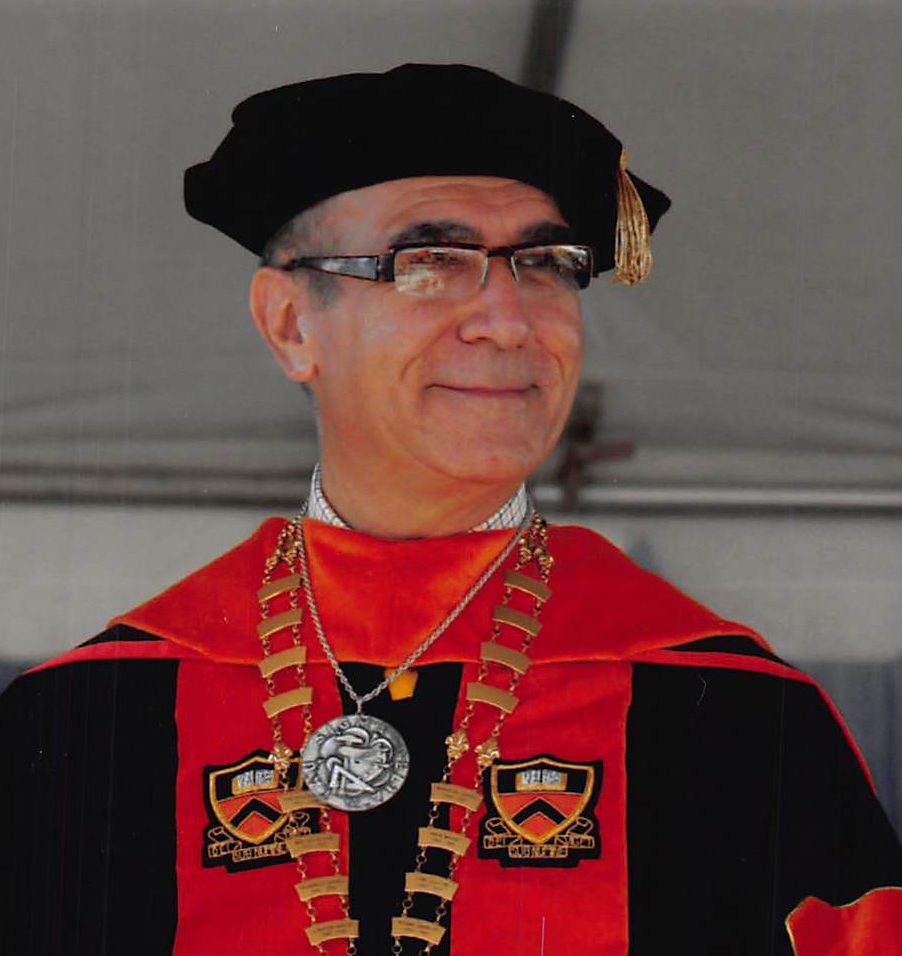
- Born: October 20, 1950 (age 75); Tehran, Iran
- Organization(s): Briar Cliff University; North Dakota University System; California State University Stanislaus; Chapman University; Queens College of the City University of New York; University of Massachusetts Lowell; University of Colorado Denver; SUNY Environmental Science and Forestry; Pennsylvania State University
- Title: Chancellor and President Emeritus

Hamid Augustine Shirvani (born October 20, 1950) is an architecture scholar, university president and chancellor emeritus.

== Early life and education ==
Shirvani was born in Tehran, Iran, and raised in London, England; he was educated in the United Kingdom and attended graduate schools in the United States. He holds a BA in Architecture from the Polytechnic of Central London, a M.Arch from Pratt Institute, a M.S. from Rensselaer Polytechnic Institute, an M.L.A. from Harvard University and both an M.A. and Ph.D. from Princeton University.

He started his academic career as an assistant professor at Pennsylvania State University and as an Associate and Full professor at the State University of New York College of Environmental Science and Forestry at Syracuse.

== Career ==
Shirvani is currently partner with Higher Education Innovation Group, Washington DC. Professor Shirvani served as President of Briar Cliff University; Senior Fellow with the American Association of State Colleges and Universities; Chancellor of the North Dakota University System; President of California State University Stanislaus; Provost and Executive Vice President at Chapman University; Vice President for Graduate Studies and Research at Queens College, City University of New York; Dean of the College of Arts and Sciences at the University of Massachusetts Lowell; and Dean of the College of Architecture and Planning at the University of Colorado Denver.

Shirvani has served on numerous public and private boards and Commissions, including: the Western Interstate Commission for Higher Education, the Midwestern Higher Education Compact, the National Association of System Heads, the NCAA Presidents Council Division II, the American Council on Education (ACE) Commission on International Initiatives, the American Association of State Colleges and Universities (AASCU) Committee on Professional Development and Workforce Development (chairman), the Governing Board of the Stockton Site Authority, the Competition Inc., and many others.

=== University of Colorado Denver ===
Shirvani was appointed the dean of the University of Colorado Denver "School of Architecture and Planning" in 1986 and resigned in 1990. Over half of the faculty had left by the time of his resignation; his actions had led to an "adversarial relationship" between himself, faculty and the administration. The master's accreditation program was placed on probation after his departure following "dissent" and "infighting" that took place. He returned in 1991 as a faculty member, which further polarized the university community.

=== California State University Stanislaus ===
In November 2009 the General Faculty of CSU Stanislaus voted for a measure of no confidence in Shirvani. The motivation for the vote according to the Academic Senate was "Shirvani’s abandonment of the shared governance process, the deteriorating working relationship between Shirvani and faculty, and Shirvani’s seeming lack of understanding of the mission of the CSU system."

In April 2010, California Attorney General Edmund G. Brown Jr. announced an investigation to accusations that the university officials including Shirvani violated public records laws when they refused to reveal the financial details of a contract with former Alaska Gov. Sarah Palin to speak at a university fundraiser, and allegedly shredded documents related to the agreement.

The contract was reportedly found in a recycling bin along with other CSU documents. These were found by two unnamed CSUS students after a tip they received stating that there was documents being shredded at the CSU on a Furlough Day. In August 2010, the Attorney General concluded his investigation and found that there was no misappropriation of funds by the Foundation and no violation of law.

=== North Dakota University System ===
On February 5, 2013, the Fargo Forum reported that State Senator Tony Grindberg (R-Fargo) would offer an amendment to the higher education funding bill that would include language to buy out the remainder of Shirvani's contract. This was politically motivated according to the Bismarck Tribune and was countered by the former Lieutenant Governor Omdahl. However, the State Board of Higher Education expressed their “wholehearted and unequivocal support” for Chancellor Shirvani. The State Board stated that “he has earned and fully deserves our gratitude and continued support.” Representative Robert Skarphol (R) from Tioga, called the attempt “beyond ridiculous” and “ totally inappropriate”, “Shirvani is highly qualified and honorable man”, who “brings both the knowledge and the will to the table, and it terrifies some people within the institutions and the legislators that a real expert may finally be at the helm and the playground atmosphere at some of the campuses may be replaced with one of seriousness and accountability.”

On March 21, 2013, the State Board of Higher Education passed a Resolution in support of Dr. Shirvani expressing that the Board “endorses and gives its full support to the chancellor for his dedication and perseverance in endeavoring to improve the quality of public higher education in North Dakota.”

On February 5, 2013, the Fargo Forum reported that State Senator Tony Grindberg (R-Fargo) will offer and amendment to the higher education funding bill that will include language to buy out the remainder of Shirvani's contract. This was politically motivated according to the Bismarck Tribune and was countered by the former Lieutenant Governor Omdahl. At the annual retreat of the North Dakota Board of Higher Education, the board went into executive session to discuss Shirvani's job performance and related proposals. On June 4, 2013, the board voted to accept a proposal which would buy out the two remaining years of his employment contract at a cost estimated to be over $800,000.

Student leaders in North Dakota have passed no confidence motions regarding Shirvani on February 23, 2013. However, the State Board of Higher Education expressed their “wholehearted and unequivocal support” for Chancellor Shirvani. The State Board stated that “he has earned and fully deserves our gratitude and continued support.” Representative Robert Skarphol (R) from Tioga, called the students’ vote “beyond ridiculous” and “ totally inappropriate”, “Shirvani is highly qualified and honorable man”, who “brings both the knowledge and the will to the table, and it terrifies some people within the institutions and the legislators that a real expert may finally be at the helm and the playground atmosphere at some of the campuses may be replaced with one of seriousness and accountability.” Furthermore, “minutes show students no confidence votes politically motivated” according to the minutes of North Dakota Student Association meeting. This is echoed by an editorial in the Great Plains Examiner.

On March 21, 2013, the State Board of Higher Education passed a Resolution in support of Shirvani expressing that the Board “endorses and gives its full support to the chancellor for his dedication and perseverance in endeavoring to improve the quality of public higher education in North Dakota.”

At the annual retreat of the ND Board of Higher Education, the board went into executive session to discuss Shirvani's job performance and related proposals. At the end of that session it was announced that the board bought out the remaining two years of the employment contract at a cost of over $800,000.

He was released from his contract on June 3, 2013.

=== Briar Cliff University ===
Shirvani resigned as president of Briar Cliff University after just over a year.

== Awards and recognition ==
In 2007 and again in 2009, the statewide student government body of the 23-campus California State University system recognized Shirvani as “President of the Year.”

== Publications ==
Shirvani has authored three books: Design Review Process, 1981; The Urban Design Process, 1985; and Beyond Public Architecture, 1990.

Shirvani has also published several dozen papers in various referred and professional journals. In addition, he has authored numerous commentaries and editorials in the Times Higher Education, Inside Higher Education, Chronicle of Higher Education, and local newspapers.
