= Governance in higher education =

Organization of tertiary educational institutions

Governance in higher education described the process and structures by which institutions of higher education are governed, taking in the making of policy and strategic planning as well as oversight of management. Governance structures for higher education vary across the world, but often have common elements.

== Governance ==
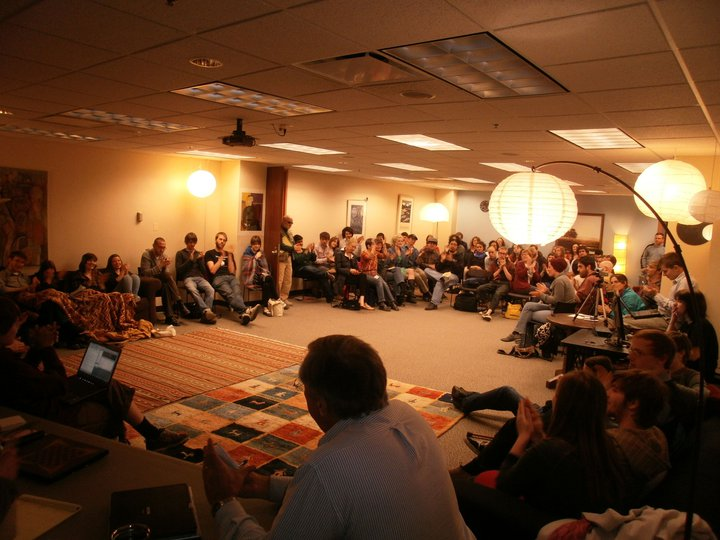
The Assembly of Shimer College, a democratic shared governance model incorporating students, faculty and staff

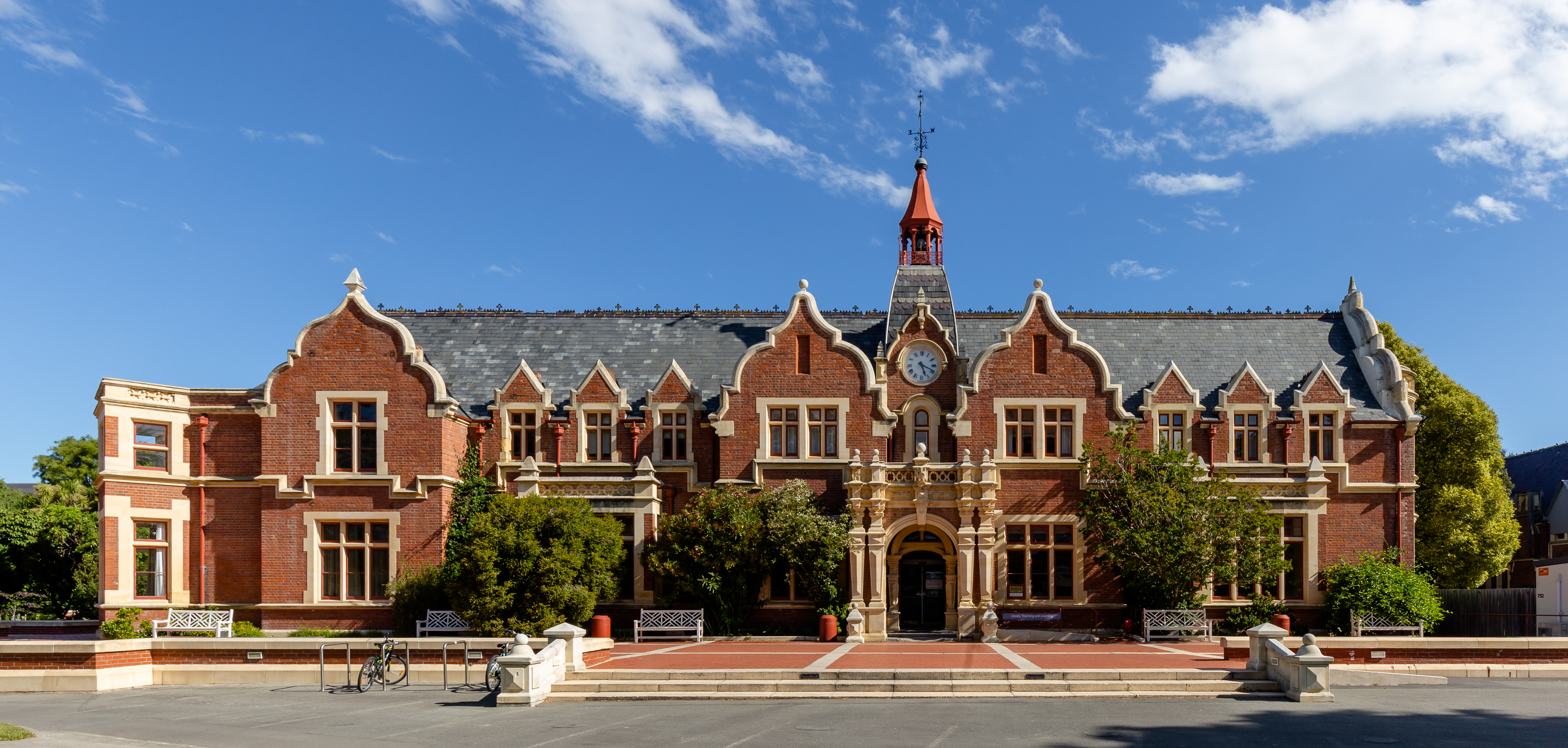
The library of Lincoln University, New Zealand

"Governance" in higher education normally refers to the process of making institutional policies and strategic decisions. It typically involves several different bodies and processes with different decision-making functions. Governance in higher education takes in corporate governance, including matters such as finance, estates and other resources, and academic governance, taking in academic matters such as admissions, standards and quality.

The two principal models of university governance are unitary, with a single body responsible for all aspects of governance, and dual, with two bodies. Dual governance may be traditional or asymmetric, depending on the balance of powers and responsibilities. Tre main two types of governing body are the board (sometimes referred to as a council or court) and the senate (sometimes called an academic board); in the dual model these are responsible for corporate governance, and academic governance, respectively.

Senates tend to be larger and to have an academic-oriented membership. Their primary concern is normally with academic matters. Boards, in contrast, tend to be smaller and to have a more diverse membership. Their competence tends to be in strategic planning and institutional finances. Unitary governance systems may have either a senate or (more usually) a board, while dual systems will almost always have both a senate and a board. In dual asymmetric models, it is normally the board that holds the dominant position. The largest group on a senate is normally the academic staff, with students as the second largest group. Non-academic staff may be included but external members are rare and mostly confined to where the senate is the single governing body in a unitary system.

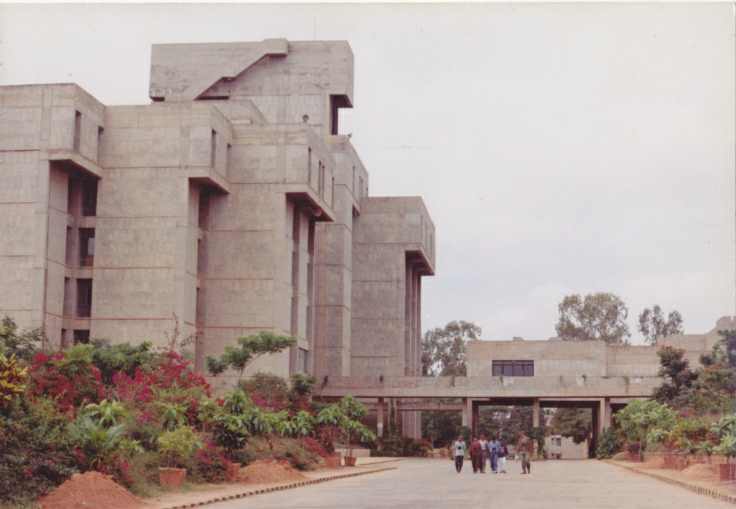
Administrative building at University of Agricultural Sciences, Bangalore

The degree of involvement of local or national governments in university governance varies between countries. Four dimensions of institutional autonomy have been identified by the European University Association (EUA): Organizational autonomy, financial autonomy, staffing autonomy and academic autonomy. Of these, organizational autonomy is most closely tied to the ability of institutions to decide on their own governance structure. The indicators used by the EUA in assessing this dimension of autonomy include the university's control over selection procedures for, selection criteria for, dismissal of, and term of office of the executive head; the university's control over inclusion and selection of external members in governing bodies, capacity to decide on academic structures; and the university's capacity to create legal entities.

The degree of involvement of university staff also varies. In a dual governance system, it is normal for academic governance to be the province of the senate-type body, typically dominated by academic staff, but the proportion of staff on the board-type body responsible for corporate governance can vary from a staff majority to having no staff representation. In a unitary system with a senate-type body, staff normally have a majority say in governance, while in the (more common) situation where this is a board-tyoe body, staff involvement even in academic governance may be quite limited. The UK's Dearing Report found that "Effective governing bodies will have a majority of lay members" and that "Effective governing bodies will also, to have legitimacy, include as full members some who are drawn from the students and staff of the institution". Contrary to this, the US Association of Governing Boards of Universities and Colleges (AGB) states that "AGB does not advocate the inclusion of faculty, staff, and students on governing boards because of the fiduciary responsibilities involved in governance".

The three main patterns in higher education governance are the Napoleonic, the Humboldtian and the Anglophone, which developed in the 19th century. Under the Napoleonic tradition, which holds sway in countries that formed part of, or were influenced by, the Napoleonic empire such as France, Italy, Spain and Portugal, governments control the universities as part of the state education system and the primary function of the universities has historically been teaching rather than research, with a focus on professional and vocational studies. The Humboldtian system, in contrast, prioritises academic autonomy and integrates research and teaching in the mission of the universities. The universities remain part of the state but with a high degree of autonomy and academic freedom, and the main role of the government is to guarantee and protect these freedoms. This model of the research university is found in countries such as Germany and Norway. The Anglophone model is based on the pattern established by the civic universities of universities as independent institutions with lay-led governing bodies. While universities are free to carry out teaching and research, the partnership with the state that sits at the heart of the Humboldtian model is absent. Instead, the government's involvement is its influence as a regulator and as the primary source of funding, acting through intermediary agencies rather than direct ministerial decisions.

== Australia ==
In October 2003, the Australian Vice-Chancellors' Committee (AVCC), the council of Australia's university presidents, put forward a "Chancellors and AVCC statement on university governance." Given national and institutional debates over the governance of tertiary education, the statement acknowledges the opportunities with developments in management and governing structures. The statement notes the role of the "business model" that has been advanced alongside the traditional models of governance in Australia. With reference to additional "third models" in introducing a discussion of the existing frameworks for the governance of tertiary education, the statement defines the legal autonomy of institutions and independence from external stakeholders. Acknowledging the diversity of governing structures and believing a balance is necessary between internal and external forces, the organization maintains: "No single way to achieve an effective governance arrangement" is possible. In recognizing the differences in institutional structures and frames of reference, the statement offers operational good practices as generic principles and recommendations, also identifying national protocols for the success of Australian higher education.

The recommendations address practices by which internal governing structures operate and how they can improve institutional governance for the Commonwealth of Australia. External relations, the role of faculty and students in governance are not approached except inasmuch as institutional board members should be appointed with their selection based on contributions "to the effective working of the governing body by having needed skills, knowledge and experience, an appreciation of the values of a university and its core activities of teaching and research, its independence and academic freedom and the capacity to appreciate the university's external community needs from that university". The committee defines the responsibilities of university governance, including legal obligations and legislative requirements for the internal governing boards of Australian institutions. Accordingly, governing bodies "should make available a programme of induction and professional development . . . to ensure that all members are aware of the nature of their duties and responsibilities". The report concludes with protocol for annual reports, including report of risk management and additional steps to ensure good governance.

Australia's public universities are increasingly governed by private-sector managerialist theories that overlook the unique nature of education as a public good, as well as the distinct idiosyncrasies and institutional cultures of individual universities. The imposition of corporate management practices has resulted in unnecessary and often harmful changes, undermining the traditional collegial model of academic governance.

Australia's universities once ranked among the world's best, but recent declines in international rankings reflect, in part, significant staff budget cuts and a drop in the quality of education. To rebuild trust and improve outcomes, universities must increase transparency around discretionary spending, allowing staff and students to clearly see how funds are being allocated. There are policies that could be introduced to increase transparency and accountability at Australia's universities.

== Austria ==
Austria operates a traditional dual governance system with universities having a board overseeing budgets and strategy and a senate responsible for academic matters. This governance arrangement is defined by law, which also defined the rectorate (executive) as a co-equal governing body. The board only contains external members, with half being nominated by the senate and half by the government. Austria is defined as having medium-high organizational autonomy, with medium-low financial autonomy, medium high staffing autonomy and high academic autonomy.

== Denmark ==
Denmark's universities have a unitary governance, with the board being the sole government body. The academic council (senate) only has a consultative role. The majority of the members of the board are external but the membership also includes elected representatives from the academic and non-academic staff as well as students. Denmark is seen as having high organizational autonomy, with medium-high financial autonomy, high staffing autonomy and medium-high academic autonomy.

== Finland ==
Finnish universities have a dual asymmetric governance structure with the board dominant and the senate (collegium) mainly having responsibility for appointing board members. In most public universities, the board has academic, non-academic, student and external members, with external members meeting up at least 40 percent. The two foundation universities (Aalto and Tampere) have fully external boards. The senates have membership drawn from the university community, with no single group holding a majority.

== Germany ==
University regulation in Germany is the responsibility of the States of Germany. Thus, universities have different governance structures in different states. Universities in Brandenburg have unitary governance by senates composed of students and academic staff, while Hesse and North Rhine-Westphalia both have traditional dual structures, with the make-up of the senate in both cases being defined by law.

== South Africa ==
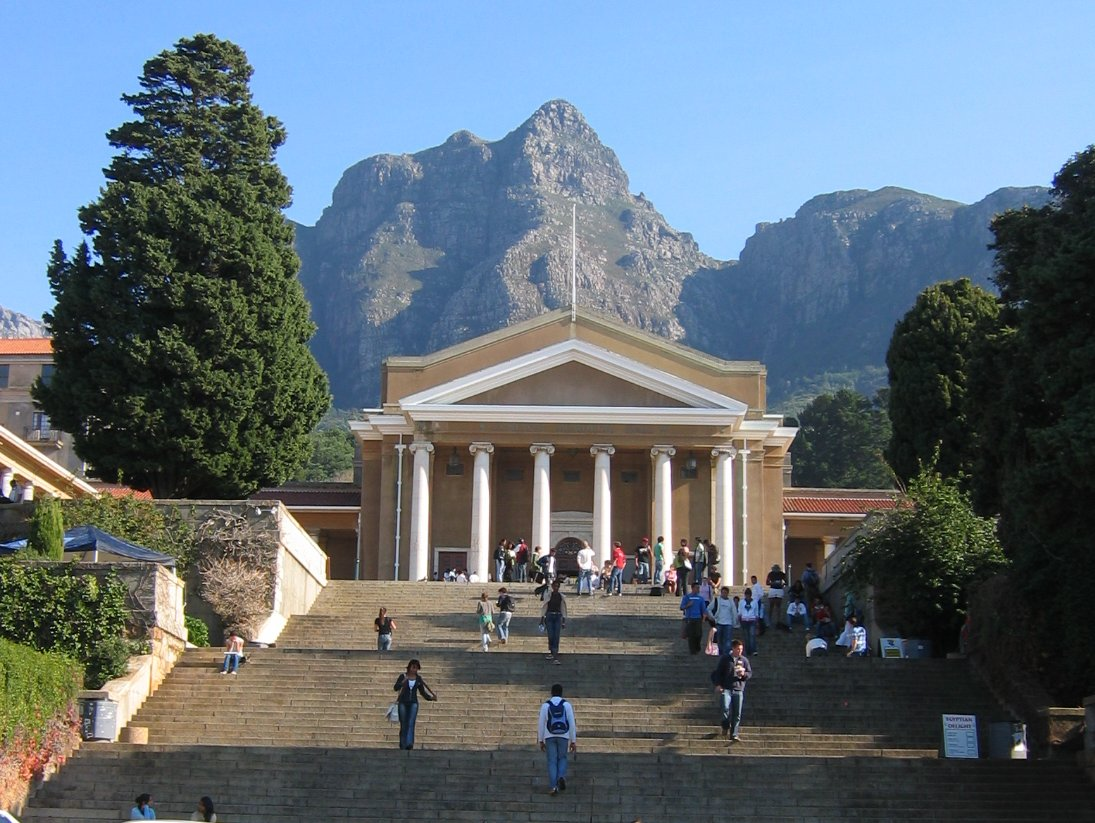
Jameson Hall at the University of Cape Town

University governance in South Africa evolved following the transition to democracy and the end of Apartheid in the 1990s. European and North American models of institutional autonomy were not entirely applicable to the South African context, leading to the concept of government "steering", based upon a cooperative framework with "conditional autonomy". The goals and objectives for cooperative governance were established by the National Commission on Higher Education in 1994.

However, the national government assumed a much stronger regulatory and bureaucratic control of postsecondary institutions than had been originally expected. Via appointments to the National Commission on Higher Education, the 1997 Higher Education Act, and the 2001 National Plan for Higher Education, the national government assumed direct control of curriculum, funding and regulation of institutions, leading to a reduction in the autonomy of universities and other higher education institutions.

== United Kingdom ==
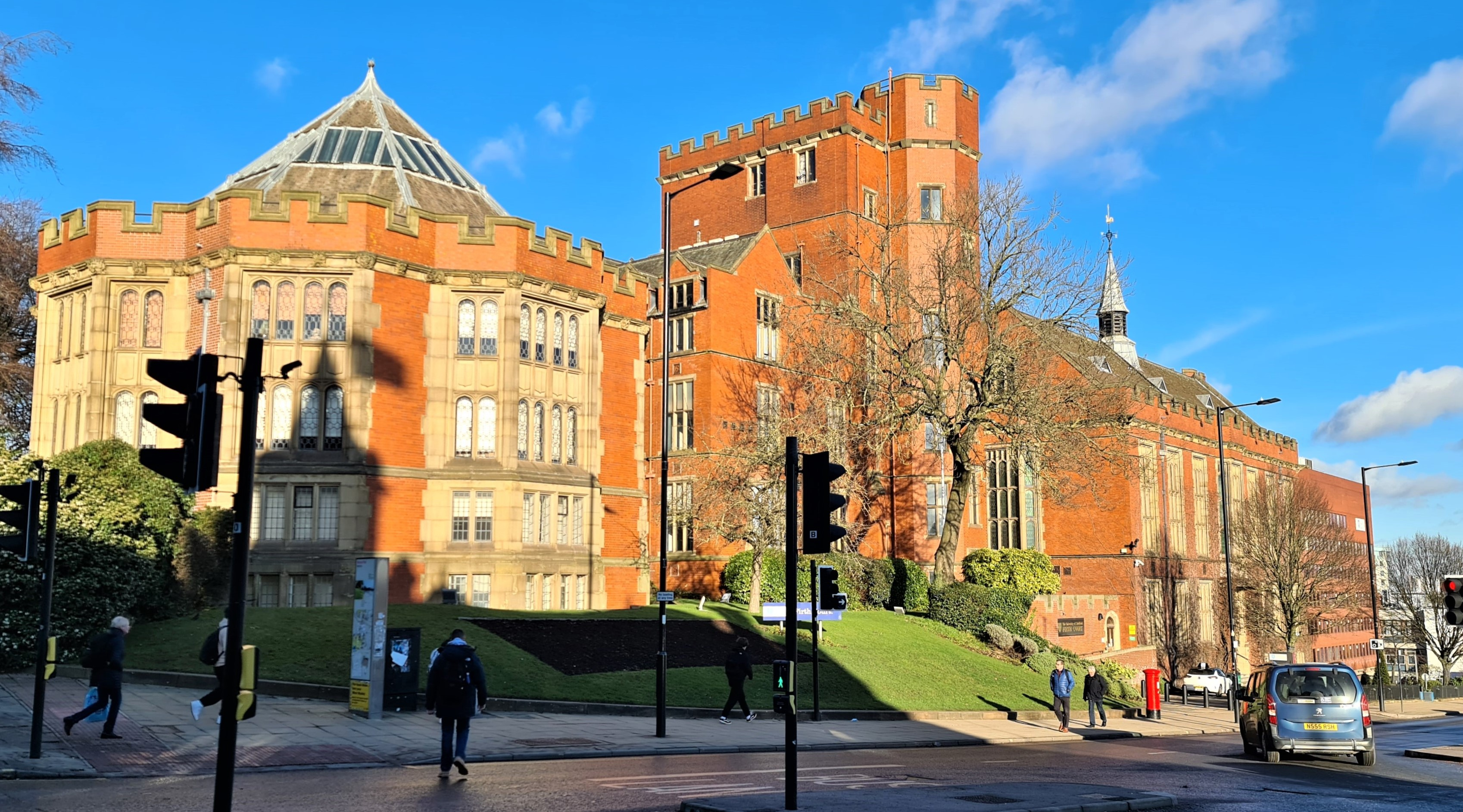
Firth Court, the main administrative centre of the University of Sheffield

Higher education is a devolved matter in the United Kingdom, with the UK government having responsibility for universities in England and the devices administrations in Scotland, Wales and Northern Ireland having responsibility for universities in those countries. Governance of universities in England, Wales and Northern Ireland is similar and generally follows a traditional dual model with a board and senate, while Scotland follows a dual asymmetric model with a court (board) in the dominant position.

== United States ==
Due to the influences of public sector reforms, several authors (Kezar and Eckel 2004; Lapworth 2004; Middlehurst 2004) point out that next to the concept of shared and participative governance a new form of governance has emerged. According to Lapworth, the rise of the notion of corporate governance and the decline of the shared or consensual governance can be seen to be a result of the decline in academic participation, a growing tendency towards managerialism and the new environment where the universities are operating.

Kezar and Eckel stated that university governance changed in the late 20th century to have more emphasis on high-stake issues and more incremental decisions made in a less collegial mode. They tie this to a trend of devaluing participation in decision making and to external pressures for more accountability and quicker decision-making. McMaster discussed the same changes in university management as resulting from the "huge amount of additional administrative work at all levels within the university, and the requirement for a wide range of specialist skills in areas such as marketing, HR management, management accounting, web development and instructional design" and the difficulties with the tensions that have resulted between collegial and corporate models of management.

Dearlove emphasises that, under the conditions of mass higher education, no university can avoid the need for some sort of bureaucratic management and organisation, though this does not mean that the importance of informal discipline and profession-based authority (internal governance of universities) can totally be ignored. Lapworth advocates what the author believes is a model of university governance with the positive aspects of corporate and collegial approaches. The issues in university governance discussed by these literatures are detailed by Coaldrake, Stedman, and Little (2003) through a comparative study of current trends in Australia, the United Kingdom, and the United States, with poignant insight into the different models of governance for the management of higher education. Critical of the currents of change toward "corporate governance," the authors cite reference to literature that calls for "re-balancing" of university governance, maintaining that the re-balancing "would amount to a clarification of shared governance". With changing roles in human resources and the external pressures for accountability affecting university relationships internally, McMaster provides insights by defining management styles in terms of nested partnership between faculty and administration, contiguous partnership, and segmented partnership. With debates over the recent trends, university organizations, governing associations, and numerous postsecondary institutions themselves have set forth policy statements on governance.

=== American Association of University Professors ===
The American Association of University Professors (AAUP) was the first organization to formulate a statement on the governance of higher education based on principles of democratic values and participation (which, in this sense, correlates with the Yale Report of 1828, which has been referred to as the "first attempt at a formally stated philosophy of education" for universities, emphasizing at that time that Enlightenment curricula following the establishment of democratic constitutional governance should not be replaced with retrogression to religious curricula). The AAUP published its first "Statement on Government of Colleges and Universities" in 1920, "emphasizing the importance of faculty involvement in personnel decisions, selection of administrators, preparation of the budget, and determination of educational policies. Refinements to the statement were introduced in subsequent years, culminating in the 1966 Statement on Government of Colleges and Universities. The document does not provide for a "blueprint" for the governance of higher education. Nor was the purpose of the statement to provide principles for relations with industry and government (though it establishes direction on "the correction of existing weaknesses"). Rather, it aimed to establish a shared vision for the internal governance of institutions. Student involvement is not addressed in detail. The statement concerns general education policy and internal operations with an overview of the formal structures for organization and management. In process and structure, the meaning with the outcome is an organizational philosophy for shared governance in higher education.

=== National Education Association ===
First published in 1987, the National Education Association (NEA) statement on faculty governance in higher education is a straightforward point of view on their policy in support of shared governance. The policy maintains that faculty involvement in governance is critical. Providing research support, the organization states faculty should advise administration in developing curriculum and methods of instruction. Faculty is responsible for establishing degree requirements, takes primary responsibility in tenure appointments and the award of promotion and sabbatical. Addressing issues through collective bargaining, the statement believes "administration and the governing boards of colleges and universities should accept the faculty's recommendations". The statement also maintains that faculty should be involved in salary decisions, evaluating administrators, and budgeting. The policy concludes with the assertion:

State and federal government and external agencies should refrain from intervening in the internal governance of institutions of higher education when they are functioning in accordance with state and federal law. Government should recognize that conserving the autonomy of these institutions is essential to protecting academic freedom, the advance of knowledge, and the pursuit of truth.

The policy statement references the AAUP's "1966 Statement on Government of Colleges and Universities." The basic principles evidently draw from the early AAUP statement on governance. Though the NEA makes no mention of students anywhere in the policy, the NEA like the AAUP does reflect the basic ideas and premise for the "responsibility primarily of the faculty to determine the appropriate curriculum and procedures of student instruction". In this respect, the AAUP grants that considerations should be made for publicly supported institutions. Unlike the NEA, the AAUP elaborates more on the role of governing structures, including the role of the president to ensure "sound academic practices", as the NEA suggests faculty rights to appeal flawed and improper procedures. In summation, where the AAUP discusses the organizational structure for governance and management in more detail while touching on student involvement, the NEA statement differs by detailing primarily faculty rights and responsibilities in shared governance.

=== Statement of community college governance ===
Following on the 1987 publication of "Policy Statement on Higher Education Faculty Governance", in 1989 the NEA issued a "Policy Statement on Higher Education Policy for Community College Governance." The NEA elaborates upon issues in support of shared governance for the management of community colleges, junior and technical colleges not addressed in their previous statement. The statement is based on the same principles, believing cooperative decision-making and collective bargaining in governance should be based on "collegial" relationships. Where statements from the NEA and the AAUP advocate the importance of faculty involvement in governance, the community college statement notes that many do not exercise the right when available and that faculty "at public institutions are not yet permitted to bargain collectively in many states". The NEA then elaborates upon the need for faculty participation.

Again, the "Policy Statement of Community College Governance" correlates based upon the same underlying principles of the AAUP and NEA statement on faculty governance. The community college statement also elaborates upon structure and procedure not addressed in the previous statement, including the "ad hoc" and standing committees as discussed in the AAUP policy statement on governance. Where the AAUP statement discusses policy on students and their academic rights, with the community college statement the NEA does not address student involvement.

=== American Federation of Teachers ===
In 2002, the Higher Education Program and Policy Council of the American Federation of Teachers (AFT) published a statement in support of the shared governance of institutions. The policy statement is a response to the fact that many governing boards have adopted the "mantra of business". The AFT iterates the purpose by which higher education achieves democratic organizational processes between administration and faculty, believing shared governance is under attack in six ways:

1. the outsourcing of instruction, particularly to learning technologies;
2. redirecting teaching to part-time and temporary faculty;
3. re-orienting curriculum to business oriented coursework;
4. the buying and selling of courseware for commercial exploitation;
5. for profit teaching and research;
6. with the formation of a "commercial consortia with other universities and private investors." Meaning, as many have begun to view education as business, they are not necessarily in the business of education.

Accordingly, six principles affirm standards of academic freedom, faculty participation in standards and curriculum, and faculty decisions on academic personnel as the AAUP first established principles of governance. The statement maintains that participation in shared governance should be extended, acknowledging that the way in which participation is expanded will vary from institution to institution; "but each group whose work contributes to the academic enterprise should be involved in a manner appropriate to institutional functions and responsibility". The policy addresses unions and faculty senates, believing that they contribute to the maintenance of shared governance in institutions as well as the role of accrediting agencies to support management standards. In conclusion, the AFT emphasizes affirmation of the goals, objectives and purpose for shared governance in higher education.

=== Association of Governing Boards ===
With recent debates and trends in the governance of institutions of higher education in the United States, the Association of Governing Boards of Universities and Colleges (AGB) issued a statement on governance, most recently updated in 2010. The original statement was published with a correlating statement, "Governing in the Public Trust: External Influences on Colleges and Universities." In the first statement on governance, the advisiory organization for institutional governance discusses facts and perceptions concerning governance, including specific facts related to institutional trends and perceptions that "internal governance arrangements have become so cumbersome that timely decisions are difficult to make". The AGB statement then defines general principles upon which governing boards are to operate and the responsibilities of a governing board to the institution; the updated principles as of 2010 are below.

1. The ultimate responsibility for governance of the institution (or system) rests in its governing board.
2. The board should establish effective ways to govern while respecting the culture of decision making in the academy.
3. The board should approve a budget and establish guidelines for resource allocation using a process that reflects strategic priorities.
4. Boards should ensure open communication with campus constituencies.
5. The governing board should manifest a commitment to accountability and transparency and should exemplify the behavior it expects of other participants in the governance process.
6. Governing boards have the ultimate responsibility to appoint and assess the performance of the president.
7. System governing boards should clarify the authority and responsibilities of the system head, campus heads, and any institutional quasi-governing or advisory boards.
8. Boards of both public and independent colleges and universities should play an important role in relating their institutions to the communities they serve.

With their statement on governing bodies, the AGB then provides statement on governing in the public trust, iterating many of the same points concerning recent external pressures. The statement defines the historic role and rationale behind the principles of citizen governance upon which state institutional boards operate. Again, addressing the nature of external influences in university governance, the AGB defines specific principles in maintaining accountability and autonomy in the public trust, including

1. the primacy of the board over individual members;
2. the importance of institutional missions;
3. respecting the board as both buffer and bridge;
4. exhibiting exemplary public behaviour; and
5. keeping academic freedom central.

In conclusion, the statement asks for the reaffirmation of a commitment to citizen governance to maintain the balanced and independent governance of institutions.

=== 2001 Kaplan Survey on higher education governance ===
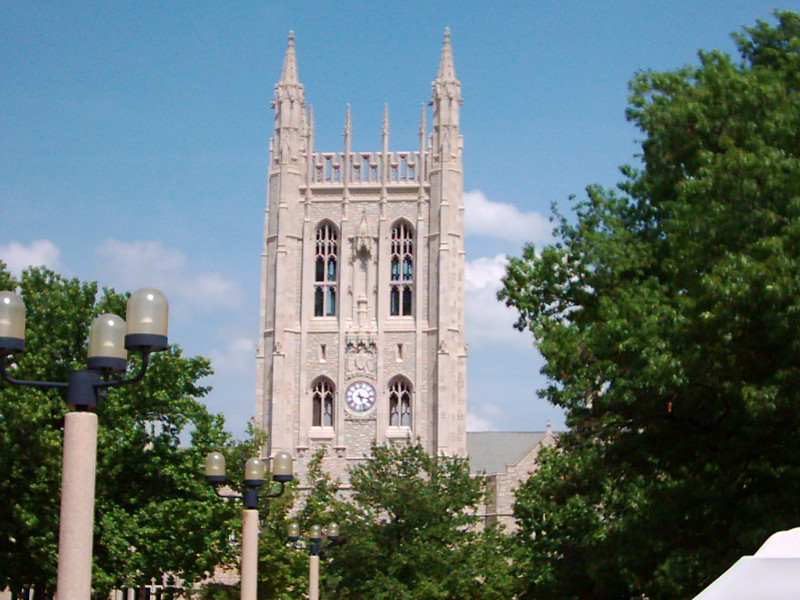
Tower of Memorial Union at University of Missouri

Sponsored by the AAUP and the American Conference of Academic Deans, the 2001 Survey of Higher Education Governance is a study done by Gabriel Kaplan, a doctoral student at Harvard University interested in replicating research done by Committee T of the AAUP thirty years previously. The findings of the report detail the method with summary of the present state of shared governance. The findings include the state of the locus of authority and reforms as well as the analysis of the challenges facing Liberal Arts Colleges with the pressures of the current economic climate. The preliminary results contain the raw data on the landscape of governance in higher education from a population of 1303 4-year institutions in the United States, with data compiled from both administrative structures and the faculty. The survey did not include participation from any population of students.

=== Shared governance and Jesuit Catholic universities ===
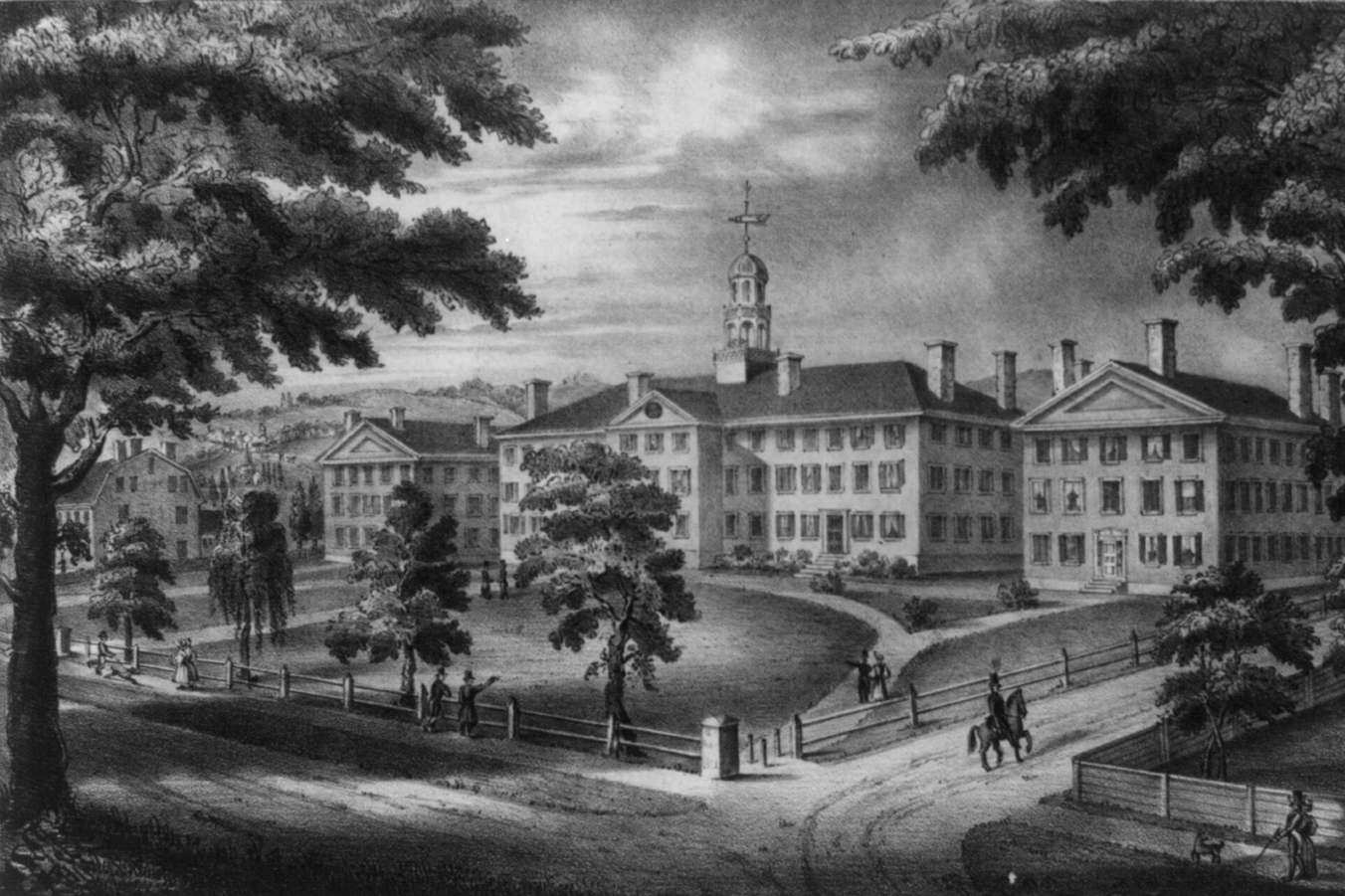
Dartmouth College, 1834

Since the 1819 U.S. Supreme Court case Dartmouth College v. Woodward before the Yale Report of 1828 (where the former was catalyst from the later, each of which upheld the separation of church and state) private universities in the United States generally maintain remarkable autonomy from local, state, and federal government. Questions might be raised over the role of shared governance in private education. In Conversations on Jesuit Higher Education, Quinn and Moore (2005) support values of shared governance in Jesuit Universities. Quinn notes the way in which Catholic colleges and universities adopted principles of shared governance throughout the 1960s. Moore begins by noting that the concept of shared governance is often viewed as inefficient in the corporate world. The author believes that shared governance is not a cumbersome system of management, but necessary given the organizational dynamics and complexities of university systems.

By contrast to corporate trends, the author maintains that the corporate "one-size-fits-all" system could not effectively suit institutional needs. From which, the perspective then affirms the AAUP tradition of shared governance as a sound system of organization and management in higher education, "essential to the long term interests of colleges and universities if they wish to remain competitive and academically credible". The way in which shared governance is realized in Catholic colleges and universities does vary from institution to institution. In Jesuit institutions, when serving the role of a board member an individual of the formal order provides guidance on the philosophy of Jesuit education while facilitating "the mutuality so essential for shared governance before the law and in reality," respecting Catholic traditions with a democratic spirit of institutional governance.

== See also ==
- Policy governance
- Comparative education
- Educational leadership
- International education
- Post-secondary educational organizations
- Students' union
