= Michelle Cooper (disambiguation) =

Michelle Cooper (born 2002) is an American soccer player.

Michelle Cooper is also the name of:

- Michelle Cooper (bowls) (born 1986), Scottish bowls player
- Michelle Cooper (politician) (fl. 2025), Canadian politician from Ontario
- Michelle Asha Cooper (fl. from 2006), American education advocate
