= Educational Policy Institute =

- Founded: 2002; 24 years ago
- Founder: Dr. Watson Scott Swail
- Type: Public policy, education, research
- Location: Virginia Beach, Virginia, U.S.
- Website: http://www.educationalpolicy.org

The Educational Policy Institute (EPI) is a research organization founded by its current president and CEO, Dr. Watson Scott Swail. EPI is dedicated to high-level research and policy analysis on a variety of educational issues, including the challenges that individuals and families from underserved communities face throughout their educational career.

EPI is a non-profit, 501(c)3 organization based in Virginia Beach, Virginia.

== History & mission ==
The Educational Policy Institute's mission is:

To expand educational opportunity for low-income and other historically-underrepresented students through high-level research and analysis. By providing educational leaders and policymakers with the information required to make prudent programmatic and policy decisions, we believe that the doors of opportunity can be further opened for all students, resulting in an increase in the number of students prepared for, enrolled in, and completing postsecondary education.

In 2002, Dr. Watson Scott Swail founded EPI to establish stronger connections between educational research and educational policy, with an emphasis on historically underserved communities such as students from low-income families, students of color, and students with disabilities. Swail chose this focus because these student populations tend to be the primary target of the majority of educational policy programs, while their voices are simultaneously under-represented in the policy-making arena. This discrepancy points to the need for a greater understanding of what factors have the greatest influence on their educational outcomes.

Another research focus for EPI is the expansion of access to educational opportunities that are found to be of high quality, with the rationale that access is only relevant if it is to a quality learning experience. As the economy has become increasingly global, EPI supports the notion that students must be armed with skills that set them up for success in a competitive and technologically savvy market. Thus, EPI recognizes the rising need for students to attain postsecondary degrees, and focuses a great deal of its research on the ability of underserved student populations to matriculate through and graduate from higher education institutions, including the financial and social challenges that come along with this goal.

== Services provided by EPI ==
EPI's areas of expertise include policy analysis, research design and evaluation, management solutions, data collection and professional development.

EPI designs and directs research and evaluation studies for organizations, schools and government agencies to answer questions that contribute to a better understanding of K-12 and postsecondary education and how to improve student outcomes. EPI designs and conducts research experiments, engages in evaluation research and survey development, and conducts data analysis. Recent projects include evaluations of federally funded initiatives including the Elementary and Secondary School Counseling Program, GEAR UP, Reading First, Safe Schools/Healthy Students, Teacher Quality Partnership, Teaching American History, Title II Improving Teacher Quality, and Title III Strengthening Institutions; evaluation design and metrics development for the Library of Congress and the Texas Education Agency; policy analysis for the National Council on Disability; and research and policy studies and technical assistance related to postsecondary student success for DeVry, the Imagine America Foundation, and TG. EPI's research and evaluation team includes researchers from around the world, who are matched to specific projects based on prior experience and expertise.

EPI has developed several software products to support educators. In 2006, EPI developed the Institutional Student Retention Assessment (ISRA), which serves as a web-based campus audit system focused on student retention. The ISRA was developed with funding from Lumina Foundation for Education. That same year, with support from TG, EPI created the Effective Practices in Student Success (EPSS) database. The EPSS currently includes 141 programs from across the US and Canada with evidence-based strategies for postsecondary access and success. In 2007, EPI created the Retention Calculator, which calculates the benefit-cost of saving or losing students in higher education institutions and systems. EPI unveiled the EPI-DAS in 2009, a longitudinal data management system that can be used in conjunction with GEAR UP and other education initiatives to track individual students, collect and analyze data, and generate reports based on findings. EPI-DAS is designed to meet the reporting requirements of the federal government under the No Child Left Behind Act.

In the realm of professional development, EPI frequently hosts workshops, conferences, and webinars to support and inform professionals in the field of education research and policy.

== Partnering organizations ==
- Member of the Organisation for Economic Co-operation and Development (OECD)
- Member of the Institutional Management in Higher Education (IMHE) forum
- Member of the American Evaluation Association
- Endorsing partner of the Data Quality Campaign
- Sponsor of the We Promise Foundation, a nonprofit organization dedicated to making dreams come true for children who struggle with severe illnesses and tremendous hardship
