= Katherine Fu =

American mechanical engineer

Katherine Kai-Se "Kate" Fu is an American mechanical engineer whose research and teaching focuses on the engineering design process, including geometric modeling. She is an associate professor of mechanical engineering at the University of Wisconsin–Madison, where she directs the Engineering Design Research Lab.

== Education and career ==
Fu credits a high school physics teacher from encouraging her to follow her older brother into engineering. She graduated from Brown University in 2007, choosing Brown because of the flexibility of its engineering program, which allowed her to take elective courses at the Rhode Island School of Design. She continued her studies at Carnegie Mellon University, where she received a master's degree in 2009 and completed her Ph.D. in 2012. Her doctoral research was co-advised by engineering design expert Jonathan Cagan and psychologist Kenneth Kotovsky.

After postdoctoral research at the Massachusetts Institute of Technology and the Singapore University of Technology and Design, she joined Georgia Tech in 2014 as an assistant professor, and was tenured as an associate professor there. In 2021 she moved to the University of Wisconsin. In 2022 she was named as the Jay and Cynthia Ihlenfeld Associate Professor.

== Recognition ==
Fu was a recipient of the Faculty Mentor of the Year award at the 2022 Institute on Teaching and Mentoring of the Southern Regional Education Board. She is an ASME Fellow, elected in 2024.
