= New England Board of Higher Education =

Interstate higher education compact agency in the U.S.

- Abbreviation: NEBHE
- Formation: 1955
- Type: Interstate compact
- Headquarters: Boston, Massachusetts, U.S.
- Region served: New England
- Website: nebhe.org

The New England Board of Higher Education (NEBHE) is a regional interstate compact agency for higher education in the six New England states. Congress consented to the New England Higher Education Compact in 1954, and NEBHE dates its founding to 1955. The NEBHE was created to expand educational opportunities and coordinate higher education resources across the region.

In 1957, the board established the New England Regional Student Program (RSP), now branded as Tuition Break. The program allows residents of New England states to enroll in specific out-of-state public higher education programs at a reduced tuition rate when a comparable program is unavailable at their home state's public institutions.

The NEBHE administers the New England Regional Student Program, now known as Tuition Break, and publishes The New England Journal of Higher Education. Additionally, the NEBHE coordinates the region for the State Authorization Reciprocity Agreement (SARA).

== History ==
Map of New England Board of Higher Education participating states

The New England Board of Higher Education (NEBHE) was established in 1955 by the six New England state governors to implement the New England Higher Education Compact and to support regional cooperation among colleges and universities. In 1957, the NEBHE created the New England Regional Student Program (RSP), which allows students from New England states to enroll in certain public institutions outside their home state at reduced tuition in instances when comparable programs are unavailable in their home state.

The RSP expanded in 1967 to include community and technical colleges and in 1972 to include state colleges. The program was later rebranded as Tuition Break. In 1979, NEBHE established the Commission on Higher Education and the Economy of New England, comprising college presidents, labor officials, professors, bank executives, publishers, and business leaders, to examine the relationship between higher education and regional economic development.

In 1986, NEBHE began publishing its journal, Connection: New England's Journal of Higher Education and Economic Development. In 1993, NEBHE launched the New England Technical Education Partnership to connect educators and industry leaders in technical fields.

In 2002, NEBHE organized a series of conferences on workforce development that led to the publication of the report Building Human Capital: A New England Strategy, which recommended reforms in science and mathematics education, adult literacy, and community colleges. In 2003, NEBHE introduced the New England Higher Education Excellence Awards.

In 2007, Connection was renamed The New England Journal of Higher Education. In 2010, the journal transitioned to an online-only format. In 2015, NEBHE launched the New England component of the State Authorization Reciprocity Agreement (SARA), funded by grants from the Lumina Foundation and the Bill & Melinda Gates Foundation, coordinating participation for the six New England states as well as New York and New Jersey.

In 2017, NEBHE established the Commission on Higher Education and Employability. In 2018, with the support of the Lumina Foundation, NEBHE launched High Value Credentials for New England (HVCNE) in partnership with Credential Engine to document and publish information on credentials in fields including life sciences, health, information technology, and business and finance in a centralized credential registry.

In 2023, NEBHE, in partnership with the New England Council, released a series of fact sheets on higher education issues in the region.

== See also ==
- National Student Exchange
- Midwestern Higher Education Compact
- Southern Regional Education Board
- Western Interstate Commission for Higher Education
