= Michelle Asha Cooper =

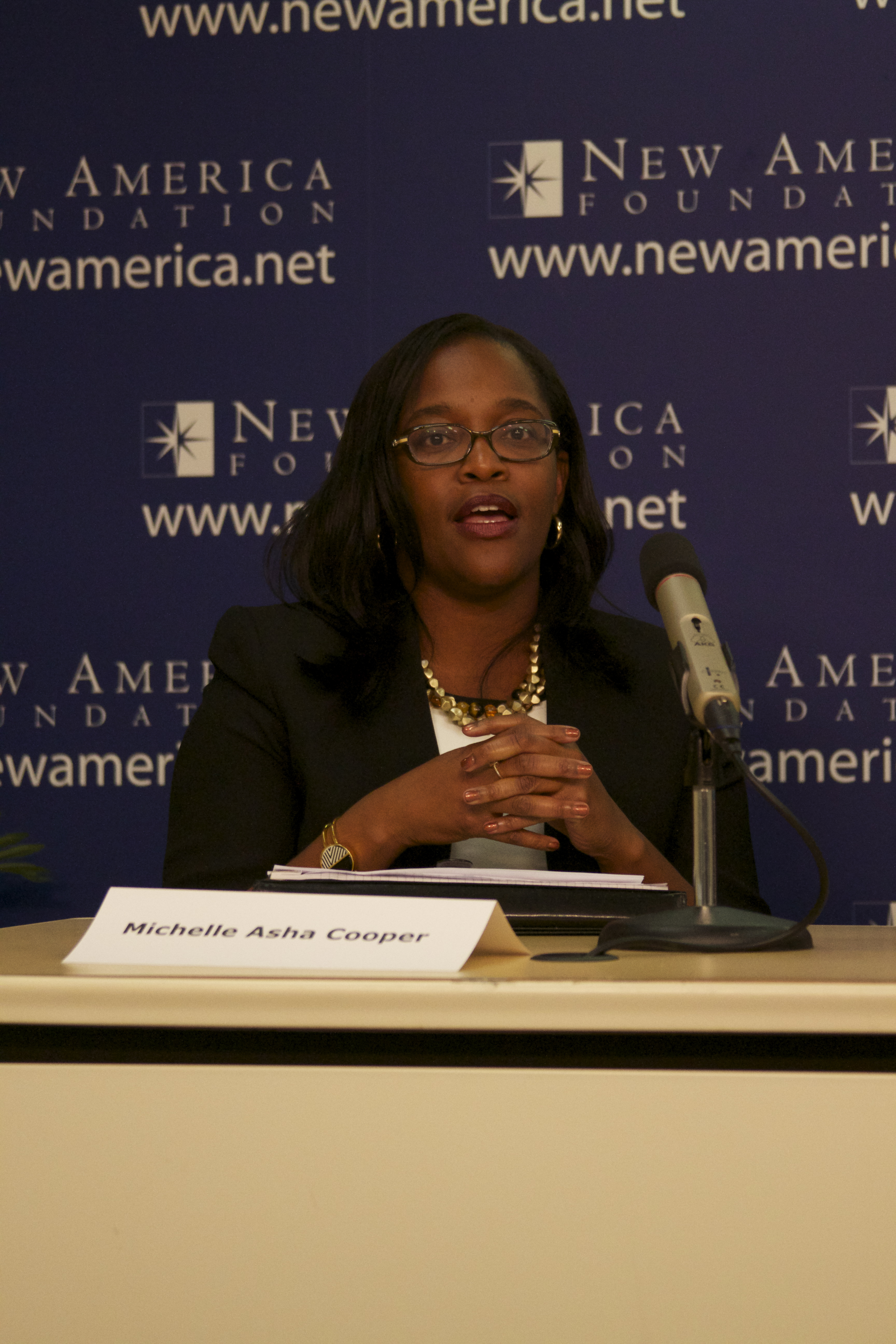
Michelle Asha Cooper in 2013

Michelle Asha Cooper is an advocate for more accessible and affordable college education in the United States, especially for students from groups underrepresented at those institutions. Originally from Charleston, South Carolina, she has been the vice president of public policy at the non-profit Lumina Foundation since October 3, 2022. Before that, she was the Deputy Assistant Secretary for Higher Education Programs and Acting Assistant Secretary for Postsecondary Education in the U.S. Department of Education. She had previously served as president of the Institute for Higher Education Policy (IHEP), a Washington, D.C.–based independent, non-profit organization.

== Early life and education ==
Cooper was born into a family of civil rights activists; her father had attended South Carolina State University and fought in the Vietnam War. Cooper grew up in Charleston, South Carolina and was educated in the public schools there. After graduating from Burke High School, she attended the College of Charleston, where she majored in English. Part of the Honors College and Delta Sigma Theta sorority, Cooper was awarded her B.A. in 1995. She received her M.P.S. from Cornell University, and Ph.D. in education policy and leadership from the University of Maryland, College Park in 2006. Her PhD thesis, "Dreams Deferred?: The Relationship Between Early and Later Postsecondary Educational Aspirations Among Racial/Ethnic Groups", studied the effect of decisions in high school on students' chances at being admitted and graduating from college, focusing on racial equity.

== Career ==
Recognizing that "scholarship and grant support" allowed her to graduate, Cooper pursued a career in education policy alongside her education. She worked as a program associate at the Association of American Colleges and Universities' Office of Diversity, Equity and Global Initiatives from 2001 to 2004. While working on her PhD, Cooper interned at the Advisory Committee on Student Financial Assistance (Advisory Committee) at the U.S. Department of Education, eventually becoming deputy director. Prior to the Advisory Committee, she worked at the Council of Independent Colleges and King's College. Cooper then led the Institute for Higher Education Policy (IHEP) as president from 2008 to February 2021. Her work at the IHEP earned her a reputation for solid research in the educational field and for successfully working with people of diverse political views.

Cooper is a member of the board of directors for the Washington Center for Internships & Academic Seminars and the College of Charleston's Foundation Board. She has previously served on the boards of uAspire, the College of Charleston Alumni Board (2011-2015), and the National College Access Network.

Cooper serves on a number of advisory boards, including the Global Attainment and Inclusion Network of the American Council on Education, the Reauthorization of the Higher Education Act Task Force of the Bipartisan Policy Commission, and the Postsecondary Value Commission of the Bill & Melinda Gates Foundation. She has previously served on advisory boards for the Lumina Foundation, CEOs for Cities' Talent Dividend Prize, the International Rankings Expert Group, the National Commission on Asian American and Pacific Islander Research in Education, and the Southern Association of Colleges and Schools Commission on Colleges.

On February 3, 2021, Cooper was named Deputy Assistant Secretary within the Office of Postsecondary Education at the U.S. Department of Education and designated as Acting Assistant Secretary for Postsecondary Education. As Acting Assistant Secretary, she oversaw efforts to help students and institutions recover financially from the COVID-19 pandemic, which included $76 billion in aid. Cooper also implemented a debt relief program that prioritized students most likely to fall behind on payments for or default on their student loans.

She left the Department of Education on October 3, 2022 and joined the Lumina Foundation as its vice president of public policy and executive director of its Washington, D.C. office.

== Awards and recognition ==
Cooper was awarded an honorary degree from the College of Charleston in 2017 and the Distinguished Alumna Award in 2016.

Cooper was selected to participate in the Aspen Institute's Presidential Leadership Fellowship, College Excellence Program in 2016.

In 2014, the Center for Nonprofit Advancement recognized Cooper with the Excellence in Chief Executive Leadership (EXCEL) award, for her achievements in nonprofit leadership and management.

Diverse: Issues in Higher Education magazine named Cooper “25 to Watch” in its special 25th anniversary issue featuring 25 up-and-coming higher education leaders. The publication also celebrated Cooper in its first-ever issue.

Politic365 named Cooper one of its 2011 "Game Changers".

Cooper is also the recipient of the 2010 University of Maryland College of Education's Outstanding Young Alumni Award and the 2002 National Education Association's Excellence in the Academy New Scholar Award.

In 2010, Essence magazine selected Cooper as a "powerful visionary" while celebrating Black women under 40 who are trailblazers.

== Higher ed expert in the media ==
Cooper has provided commentary to various media outlets including C-SPAN, and NPR as well as The Chronicle of Higher Education, The Hill, Huffington Post, Inside Higher Ed, USA Today, and Washington Post.

She co-authored Becoming a Student-Ready College: A New Culture of Leadership for Student Success, which reverses the college readiness conversation to offer a new paradigm on institutional value-add in boosting student outcomes.
