= Yale Report of 1828 =

Yale College faculty report

The Yale Report of 1828 is a document written by the faculty of Yale College in staunch defense of the classical curriculum. The report maintained that because of Yale's primary object of graduating well-educated and well-rounded men, it should continue to require all of its students to follow a single thorough curriculum, with Latin and Greek literature at its core. Before the release of the report, there was a gradual movement toward a more open, elective course of study at colleges around the United States. The report was in part a response to the criticism of Latin and Greek as "dead languages".

According to the Yale Daily News, the report was released "as the University's reputation was at its zenith", when "the eyes of the nation's academic community focused on New Haven". The highly-influential report, which reformers have complained set back curricular reforms by decades, tipped the balance at universities across the United States, including at Princeton and Harvard, toward a conservative approach to higher education.

The report was issued in two parts. Part I presents the plan for education at Yale and defends the classical curriculum and Part II specifically considers the importance of the classical languages to the curriculum.

== History ==
The report was issued after a September 11, 1827, resolution of Yale's President and Fellows ordered a faculty committee "to inquire into the expediency of so altering the regular course of instruction in this college, as to leave out of said course the study of the dead languages, substituting other studies therefor; and either requiring a competent knowledge of said languages, as a condition of admittance into the college, or providing instruction in the same, for such as shall choose to study them after admittance." The faculty signed its report with September 9, 1828, as its date.

== A prescribed curriculum ==
The report acknowledges that changes to the curriculum "may, from time to time be made with advantage, to meet the varying demands of the community, to accommodate the course of instruction to the rapid advance of the country, in population, refinement, and opulence", but argued for a prescribed set of courses that all students should meet:

The two great points to be gained in intellectual culture, are the discipline and the furniture of the mind; expanding its powers, and storing it with knowledge. The former of these is, perhaps, the more important of the two. A commanding object, therefore, in a collegiate course, should be, to call into daily and vigorous exercise the faculties of the student. Those branches of study should be prescribed, and those modes of instruction adopted, which are best calculated to teach the art of fixing the attention, directing the train of thought, analyzing a subject proposed for investigation; following, with accurate discrimination, the course of argument; balancing nicely the evidence presented to the judgment; awakening, elevating, and controlling the imagination; arranging, with skill, the treasures which memory gathers; rousing and guiding the powers of genius. All this is not to be effected by a light and hasty course of study; by reading a few books, hearing a few lectures, and spending some months at a literary institution.

By endorsing a prescribed course of study, the Yale faculty denounced the concept of preparing its undergraduates for specific professional work. "Our object is not to teach that which is peculiar to any one of the professions; but to lay the foundation which is common to them all."

== Latin and Greek ==
Part II of the report argued that beyond the requisites of the liberal arts and sciences, knowledge of ancient Greek and Latin was the foundation for a liberal education. It states that

the study of the classics is useful, not only as it lays the foundations of a correct taste, and furnishes the student with those elementary ideas which are found in the literature of modern times, and which he no where so well acquires as in their original sources,—but also as the study itself forms the most effectual discipline of the mental faculties.

However, the report conceded that not all students were satisfied with the curriculum, and suggested the possibility of a plan "to confer degrees on those only who have finished the present established course,—but to allow other students, who do not aim at the honors of the college, to attend on the instruction of the classes as far as they shall choose."

Despite this concession, the faculty committee's report strongly praised "the course which has hitherto been pursued", and, in fact, aimed to strive to make the curriculum even more focused on classical studies. It proposed that "the terms of admission may very properly, be gradually raised so as ultimately to render necessary, as a condition of admission, much greater acquirements, especially in the classics, than the laws of the college at present prescribe."
