= Safe Schools/Healthy Students =

Grant program funded by the United States Department of Education

Safe Schools/Healthy Students (SS/HS) is a grant program funded by the United States Department of Education, United States Department of Justice, and United States Department of Health and Human Services that helps school districts, in partnership with mental health providers, law enforcement and juvenile justice agencies, implement projects that create safe and healthy schools and communities.

== Mission and history ==
The US Departments of Education, Justice, and Health and Human Services funded the Safe Schools/Healthy Students Initiative in 1999 in response to the school shootings in the late 1990s, including the 1997 Heath High School shooting, the 1998 Westside Middle School shooting, and the Thurston High School shooting. Since 1999 the SS/HS Initiative has awarded grants totaling more than $2.1 billion to over 300 local education agencies in a range of urban, suburban, and rural communities.

The SS/HS Initiative addresses five elements within each site:

- Safe school environments and violence prevention activities.
- Alcohol and other drug prevention activities.
- Student behavioral, social, and emotional supports.
- Mental health services.
- Early childhood social and emotional learning programs.

== Impact ==
The White House Office released a report in August 2011 citing the Safe Schools/Healthy Students Initiative as one of the three model programs that uses a community approach to prevent violence. The report, Empowering Local Partners To Prevent Violent Extremism In The United States, says that “the United States has rich experience in supporting locally-based initiatives that connect communities and government to address community challenges through collaboration and the development of stakeholder networks.”

A five-year evaluation of the program found that 90 percent of school staff saw reduced violence on campus and almost 80 percent said the grant had reduced violence in their communities.
