= Jamie Merisotis =

American philanthropist

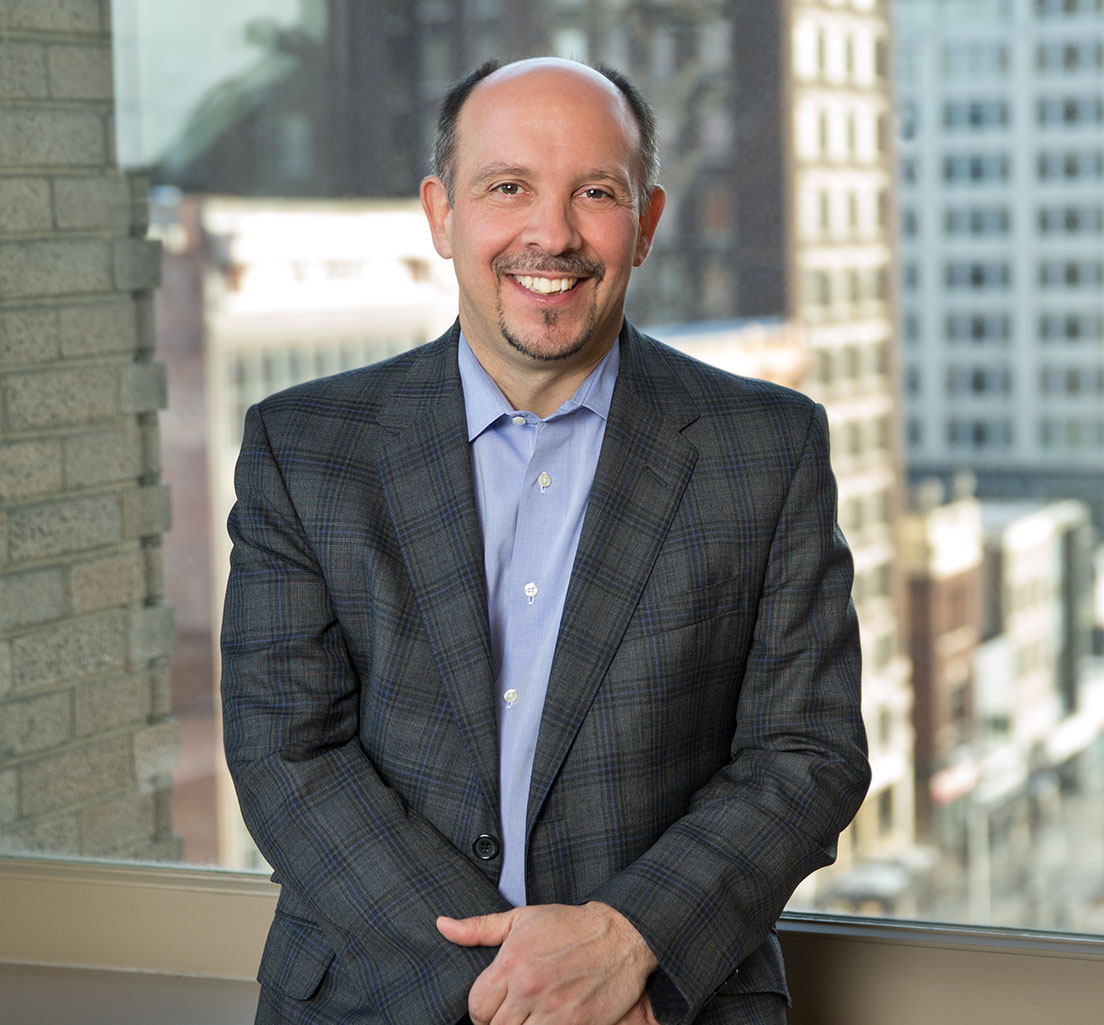
- Jamie Merisotis, Apr. 2015
- Education: Bates College
- Occupations: President and CEO, Lumina Foundation
- Spouse: Colleen T. O'Brien
- Website: jamiemerisotis.com

Jamie Merisotis is an American philanthropist. He is the president and CEO of Lumina Foundation, a private organization in the United States that aims to increase the number of Americans holding high-quality degrees, certificates, and credentials to 75% by 2040. The foundation reported net assets of $1.5 billion at the end of 2024.

== Life and career ==
Before joining Lumina Foundation as president and CEO in 2008, Merisotis was the founding president of the Institute for Higher Education Policy, an education research and policy center. He was also the executive director of the National Commission on Responsibilities for Financing Postsecondary Education, a bipartisan commission appointed by the U.S. president and congressional leaders to address college affordability. Merisotis also helped create the Corporation for National and Community Service (AmeriCorps), serving as an adviser to senior management on issues related to the quality and effectiveness of national service initiatives.

Merisotis is a frequent source and commentator on issues related to higher education, talent development, and the future of work. His writing has appeared in The Washington Post, The New York Times, The Wall Street Journal, National Journal, Stanford Social Innovation Review, Washington Monthly, The Huffington Post, Politico, Roll Call, and other publications. As of 2026, he was a regular contributor to Forbes.

Merisotis holds a bachelor's degree in political science from Bates College in Lewiston, Maine, and has served on the college's board of trustees. He serves as a Governor of The Ditchley Foundation, based in the United Kingdom, and is a past chairman of the Council on Foundations in Washington, DC. He is a member of the board of directors of the CEOs of Indiana Corporate Partnership, formerly the Central Indiana Corporate Partnership. He also has served as chairman of the board for The Children's Museum of Indianapolis, the world's largest museum for children.

Merisotis' work includes experience as an adviser and consultant in southern Africa, the former Soviet Union, Europe and other parts of the world. He previously served as a member of the Council on Foreign Relations.

Merisotis has published two books, America Needs Talent, and Human Work in the Age of Smart Machines.

Merisotis lives in Indianapolis with his wife, Colleen O'Brien.

== Awards and recognition ==
Merisotis' 2015 book America Needs Talent, was named a Top Business Book of 2016 by Booklist.

Merisotis has received awards and honorary degrees from several colleges and universities, including Excelsior College, University of South Florida, Ivy Tech Community College of Indiana, Miami Dade College and Western Governors University.

In 2003, he received the Distinguished Young Alumni Award from Bates College; in 2001, he was recognized with the Community College Government Relations Award presented by the American Association of Community Colleges and the Association of Community College Trustees.

Merisotis was a 2005 finalist for the Brock International Prize in Education, and in 1998 he was named by Change: The Magazine of Higher Learning as one of the emerging young leaders (under the age of 45) in American higher education.
