= Midwestern Higher Education Compact =

U.S. interstate compact

- Formation: 1991
- Headquarters: Minneapolis, Minnesota
- Website: www.mhec.org

The Midwestern Higher Education Compact (MHEC) is a regional interstate compact that promotes cooperation and resource sharing in higher education. The member states of the Compact are Illinois, Indiana, Iowa, Kansas, Minnesota, Michigan, Missouri, Nebraska, North Dakota, Ohio, South Dakota, and Wisconsin.

The Compact is one of four regional compacts in the United States dedicated to advancing higher education.

MHEC is headquartered in Minneapolis, Minnesota.

== Organization ==
The 'MHEC Executive Committee is the MHEC's governing body. Each member state appoints five commissioners to the executive committee. These commissioners consist of the governor or the governor's designee, a member of each chamber of the state legislature, and two at-large members, one of whom must come from postsecondary education.

MHEC is funded through appropriations from its member states and foundation grants. It is designated as a 501(c)(3) non-profit organization. MHEC's initiatives save colleges, universities, and students millions of dollars annually. Research and convenings generate ideas and policies that improve the quality, accessibility, and affordability of postsecondary education, and have over 100 employees across 12 Member states.

== See also ==
- National Student Exchange
- New England Board of Higher Education
- Southern Regional Education Board
- Western Interstate Commission for Higher Education
