= Western Interstate Commission for Higher Education =

Higher education organization in the U.S.

Western Interstate Commission for Higher Education (WICHE)
- Formation: 1953
- Headquarters: Boulder, Colorado
- Region served: Western United States
- Website: wiche.edu

The Western Interstate Commission for Higher Education is a nonpartisan, regional interstate higher education compact and 501(c)(3) nonprofit organization based in Boulder, Colorado.

The WICHE region consists of Alaska, Arizona, California, Colorado, Hawai'i, Idaho, Montana, Nevada, New Mexico, North Dakota, Oregon, South Dakota, the U.S. Pacific Territories and Freely Associated States, Utah, Washington, and Wyoming.

It is one of four regional interstate higher education compacts in the United States.

== History ==
Map of WICHE participating states

In 1950, governors attending the Western Governors' Conference convened to draft the Western Regional Education Compact to help the West address higher education and workforce issues distinct to the region. The following year, 14 commissioners from the five states that ratified the Western Regional Education Compact – Colorado, Montana, New Mexico, Oregon, and Utah – began to organize. In 1953, the Western Regional Education Compact was signed into law by President Dwight D. Eisenhower, officially establishing the Western Interstate Commission for Higher Education. In 2023, WICHE celebrated its 70th year serving the West.

== WICHE's Structure ==
WICHE's 48 commissioners are appointed by the governors of the 15 Western states and the U.S. Pacific Territories and Freely Associated States. Commission activities are funded in part through annual dues paid by region members and in part through grants and sponsorships. The WICHE Commission meets twice a year in locations across the West and oversees the development of WICHE programs, ensuring that the Western Regional Educational Compact is carried out for the benefit of the West's residents. They do so by developing and approving the organization's annual Workplan, which outlines the diverse set of activities, projects, and initiatives the WICHE Commission has prioritized for the fiscal year beginning July 1, all intended to advance WICHE's mission.

Located in the State Higher Education Policy Center (SHEPC), WICHE administers its work across four units: Programs and Services, Policy Analysis and Research, WCET – the WICHE Cooperative for Educational Technologies, and the WICHE Behavioral Health Program.

== See also ==
- Midwestern Higher Education Compact
- New England Board of Higher Education
- Southern Regional Education Board
