= Southern Regional Education Board =

Nonprofit organization based in Atlanta, Georgia

- Formation: 1948
- Headquarters: Atlanta, Georgia
- Website: www.sreb.org

Map of SREB participant states

The Southern Regional Education Board (SREB) is a nonpartisan, nonprofit organization based in Atlanta, Georgia, that works to improve education at every level in its 16 states: Alabama, Arkansas, Delaware, Florida, Georgia, Kentucky, Louisiana, Maryland, Mississippi, North Carolina, Oklahoma, South Carolina, Tennessee, Texas, Virginia and West Virginia. The nation's first regional interstate compact for education, SREB was founded in 1948 by governors and legislators who recognized the link between education and economic vitality.

== See also ==
- National Student Exchange
- Midwestern Higher Education Compact
- New England Board of Higher Education
- Western Interstate Commission for Higher Education
