= Association of Governing Boards of Universities and Colleges =

Nonprofit organization in Washington D.C., United States

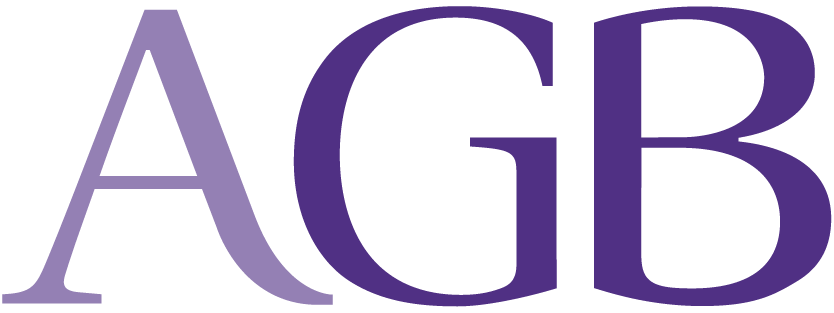
- Abbreviation: AGB
- Formation: established 1921; 105 years ago
- Type: Nonprofit
- Tax ID no.: 84-0502574
- Legal status: 501(c)(3)
- Headquarters: 1666 K Street NW, Suite 1200, Washington, D.C. 20006
- Region served: International
- Fields: Higher education
- Members: 1500
- Staff: 51
- Website: Official website
- Formerly called: Association of Governing Boards of State Universities and Allied Institutions (1921-1963)

The Association of Governing Boards of Universities and Colleges (AGB) is a nonprofit 501(c)(3) U.S. higher education association established in 1921. AGB serves approximately 2,000 colleges, universities, and institutionally related foundations. The association provides research, publications, programming, and consulting services to support higher education governance. AGB is located in Washington, D.C.

According to Gale Business Insights, the organization, "addresses the problems and responsibilities of trusteeship in all sectors of higher education and the relationships of trustees and regents to the president, the faculty, and the student body."

As of 2026, the president of the organization is Ross A. Mugler.

== History ==
=== Founding ===
AGB was founded in 1921. It grew out of a conference held at the University of Michigan in 1920.

Until the early 1960s the Association of Governing Boards of Universities and Colleges was an affiliation of board members who took turns sharing the leadership and guidance needed to sustain an organization. The early organization operated as the Association of Governing Boards of State Universities and Allied Institutions, and membership was open to “any college or university in any state, or other political sub-division, which may be recognized by a state as a state university, and such other allied or tax-supported institutions as may be elected to membership.” Without a commissioned staff, the association's activities were limited to annual meetings of its various committees.

In 1964, AGB joined with the American Council on Education (ACE) and the American Association of University Professors’ (AAUP) to formulate a joint publication, the Statement on Government of Colleges and Universities. It was published in 1966.

In 1988, AGB and Independent Sector established the National Center for Nonprofit Boards (now BoardSource) to provide information, tools, training, and leadership development for board members of nonprofit organizations.

=== 21st century ===
In 2004, AGB established the John W. Nason Award for Trusteeship. This award was named for John W. Nason, who was president of Swarthmore College during World War II and chair of the National Japanese American Student Relocation Council. He helped get 4,000 American students of Japanese descent out of detention camps to continue their higher education. The award recognizes higher education governing boards that have demonstrated innovation and leadership. Recent recipients include the boards of Colorado Mountain College, Holyoke Community College Foundation, Texas Christian University, Utah State University Foundation, and Xavier University of Louisiana.

In 2010, AGB Search, LLC was created, to provide executive search, interim search, and compensation evaluation services for colleges.

In 2013, AGB formed a commission of former and current leaders to reexamine how boards and regents govern higher education. The National Commission on College and University Board Governance was chaired by Philip N. Bredesen Jr., a former governor of Tennessee, and developed a set of recommendations for college trustees to more effectively govern colleges. These recommendations were published under the name, Consequential Boards: Adding Value Where It Matters Most.

In 2016, AGB performed a study on shared governance and four principles that trustees should follow concerning shared governance. After the study, AGB released a statement reminding trustees of the importance of shared governance.

In 2017, AGB published a report focused on campus culture and free speech. AGB called for campus leaders to listen to student concerns, know First Amendment rights and how they apply on campuses, and develop policies that make it clear that free speech aligns with an institution's mission.

In 2020, AGB launched its Justice, Diversity, Equity, and Inclusion (JDE&I) Initiative, recognizing the urgency for governing boards to examine and address systemic barriers in their own work, at all levels of the institution, and beyond the borders of the campus. This work resulted in the release of the AGB Board of Directors Statement on Justice, Equity, and Inclusion.

In 2021, AGB released a new statement, which focused on achieving justice, equity, and inclusion at all member institutions. The association also published the Principles of Trusteeship, and Policies, Practices, and Composition of Governing Boards of Colleges, Universities, and Institutionally Related Foundations, a report that builds on data that AGB has gathered since 1969.

In early 2023, AGB organized the Council on Higher Education as a Strategic Asset, known as HESA. The council plans to develop policy recommendations to advance higher education as a critical component of the United States’ ability to stay globally competitive.

== Membership ==
AGB's membership includes the governing boards of approximately 2,000 community colleges, public and private institutions, research universities, and liberal arts colleges. Combined, AGB membership includes approximately 40,000 higher education trustees and regents. AGB has seven advisory councils for specific leadership roles and priority areas: presidents, board chairs, board professionals, finance committee chairs, foundation leaders, senior fellows, and student success.

== Role in Higher Education Governance ==
AGB provides leadership, counsel, and training resources for board members, organizational staff, policy makers, and others involved in the running of colleges and universities. These resources aim to help members in the areas of fiduciary duties, governance, orientation and onboarding, student success, and conflicts of interest. AGB developed self-paced orientation courses that cover subjects such as governance, fiduciary responsibilities, and board composition and culture.

=== AGB Institute for Leadership & Governance in Higher Education ===
The AGB Institute is a joint venture between AGB, AGB Search, and Miami University. The Institute selects participants from higher education institutions to participate in its leadership training. This includes symposiums, workshops, shadowing a sitting university president or chancellor, and attending the AGB National Conference on Trusteeship.

=== Trustee Fiduciary Duties ===
AGB's publication Higher Education Governing Bodies: An Introductory Guide for Members of College, University, and System Boards provides details on the “essential” responsibilities and fiduciary duties of governing boards. The publication says that, “The board itself bears the fiduciary responsibility for the institution it governs,” and “while differences in institutional type may account for differences in how a board carries out its governance responsibilities, the responsibilities are essentially the same for all institutions.” These responsibilities fall under the duties of care, loyalty, and obedience to the institution and its students, faculty, alumni, and community.

Duty of Care: This duty generally requires officers and governing board members to carry out their responsibilities in good-faith and using a degree of diligence, care, and skill which prudent persons would reasonably exercise under similar circumstances in like positions. Accordingly, board members must act in a manner that is in the best interests of the institution.

Duty of loyalty: The duty of loyalty requires officers and board members to act in good faith and in a manner that is reasonably believed to prioritize the interests of the institution rather than their own interests or the interests of another person or organization.

Duty of obedience: This is the duty of board members to ensure that the college or university is operating in furtherance of its stated purposes (as set forth in its governing documents) and is operating in compliance with the law. The board should also periodically re-evaluate its purposes and mission and must be prepared to amend or change them when it is necessary and appropriate to do so under the law and the institution's governing documents.

=== Shared Governance ===
AGB states that, shared governance should align stakeholders on institutional direction by developing a common understanding of challenges, and should serve as a system of checks and balances that strengthen institutional operations.

=== Business Model Oversight ===
In the joint publication Collaborative Leadership for Higher Education Business Model Vitality from AGB, NACUBO, Baker Tilly, and the Council of Independent Colleges, primary author Stephen T. Golding outlines how institutional leadership can define expectations, clarify business goals and objectives, and prioritize the steps to position the institution to address challenging economic conditions.

Through its service AGB Consulting, AGB provides help developing new business models. The company performs evaluations and diagnostic assessments, then develops strategies to address operational and financial challenges, and assists with implementation.

=== Higher Education Foundation Governance ===
Foundations traditionally help to finance special projects and initiatives; however, their role has shifted and now also includes working as a philanthropic and entrepreneurial partner to support their school's basic business and operating model. In 2016, the AGB Board of Directors issued a statement on the institution-foundation partnership. The statement offers guidance on how both institutions and foundations can mitigate potential risks stemming from foundation activities, align foundation activities alongside university priorities, and fulfill fiduciary responsibility for the oversight of these organizations, which are typically 501(c)3 publicly supported charities. Foundations traditionally help to finance special projects and initiatives; however, their role has shifted and now also includes working as a philanthropic and entrepreneurial partner to support their school's basic business and operating model.

=== Board Role in Student Success ===
In 2021, AGB published the Board of Directors’ Statement on Justice, Equity, and Inclusion And Guidance for Implementation, calling on governing boards to examine and address barriers to justice, equity, and inclusion at the board level, across the institution, and in surrounding communities. That year, AGB also established a Council for Student Success. In 2022, AGB published the “Board Responsibility for Equitable Student Success” resource, supported by the Bill and Melinda Gates Foundation. AGB called on boards to take an active role in student success, paying special attention to issues of equity, inclusion, and belonging.

== Board Assessments ==
AGB believes that board assessments or self-examinations help establish a clearer understanding of members’ primary roles and responsibilities, develop a consensus on objectives and plans to improve the board, and help clarify the performance expected by all board members. These assessments should be completed annually.

== The Role of the Board Professional in Higher Education ==
Board professionals guide and advise a board and president but are not a part of any decision making. They must be experts on procedures and institutional policies. There are five common board professional roles:

- Secretary to the Board and secretary to the president
- Secretary to the board and presidential assistant
- Secretary to the Board – Administrative Officer
- Secretary of the board or Corporate Secretary
- Assistant to the board

In 2022, AGB released the Board Professional Certificate Program.

== Annual meetings ==
- The National Conference on Trusteeship
- The Board Professionals Conference
- The Foundation Leadership Forum
