= Lumina Foundation =

Non-profit educational organization

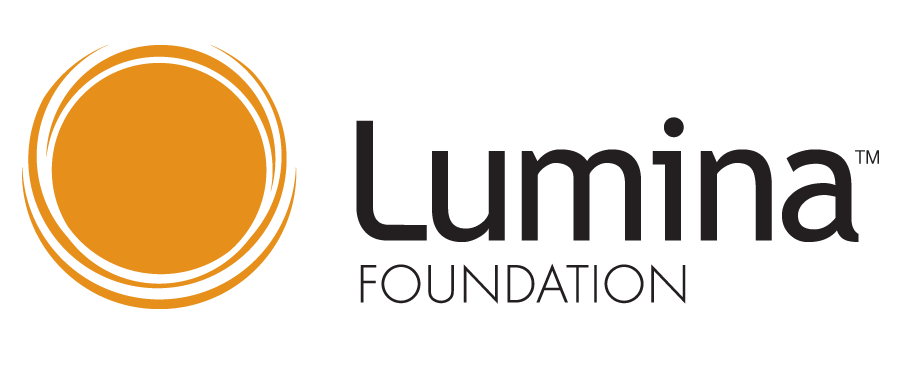
- Founded: July 31, 2000; 26 years ago
- Founder: Conversion from USA Group
- Purpose: Expanding access and success in postsecondary education
- Location: Indianapolis, Indiana, U.S.
- Region served: United States
- Method: Grants, funding
- Revenue: $101,413,918 (2022)
- Expenses: $63,876,354 (2022)
- Endowment: 1.4 billion USD
- Website: www.luminafoundation.org

Lumina Foundation is a private, Indianapolis-based foundation with about $1.4 billion in assets. Since its founding in August 2000, Lumina has made grants totaling more than $250 million.

== History ==
Lumina Foundation is a conversion foundation created in mid-2000 as USA Group, Inc., which sold most of its operating assets to the Student Loan Marketing Association, Inc. (Sallie Mae). Proceeds from the sale established the USA Group Foundation with an endowment of $770M. The foundation was renamed Lumina Foundation for Education in February 2001.

== Presidents ==
- Martha Lamkin 2000–2007
- Jamie P. Merisotis 2007–present
