= Paul Manhart =

Jesuit missionary

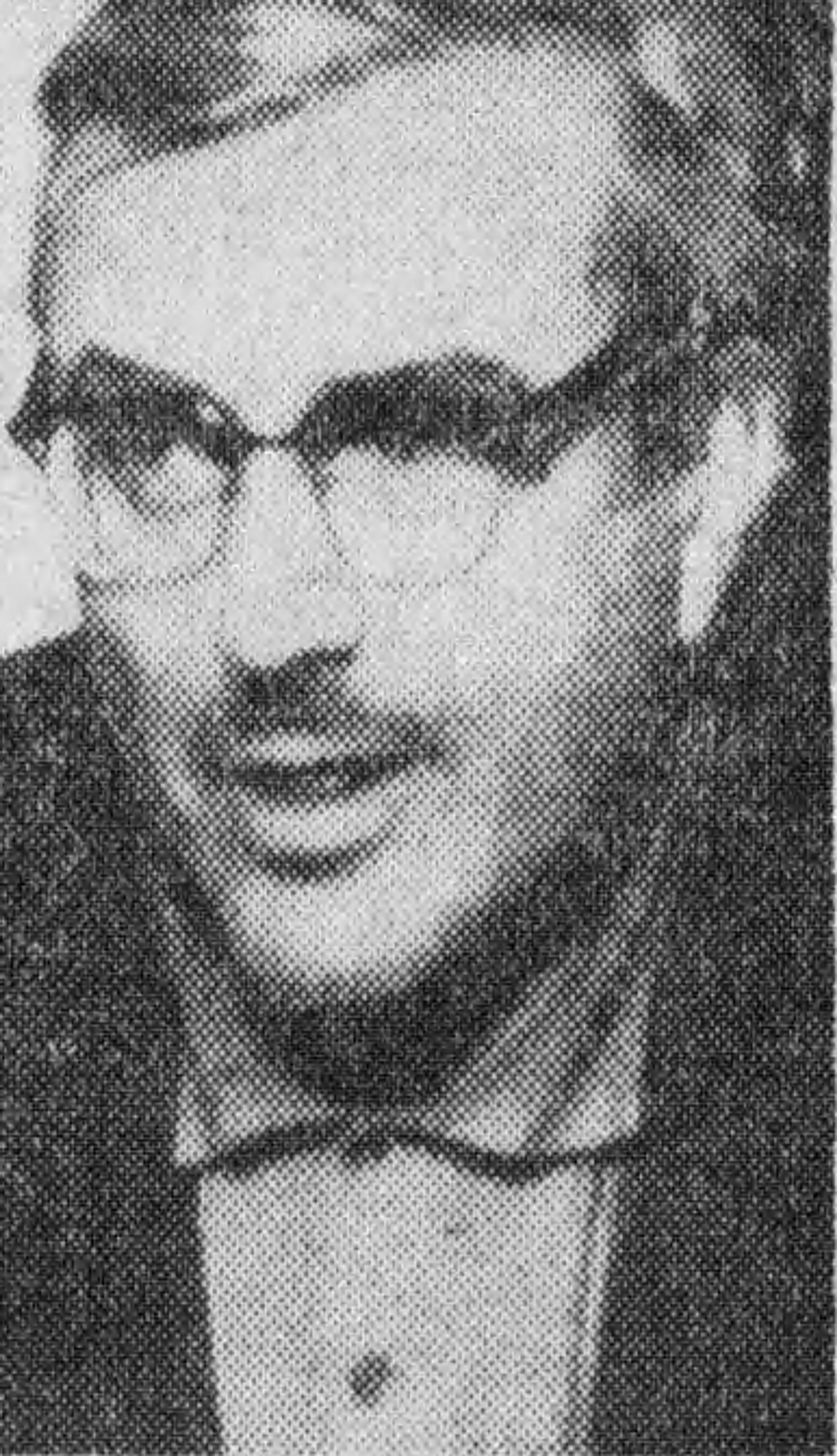
Manhart in 1973

Paul Ignatius Manhart, S.J. (2 January 1927 – 1 May 2008) was ordained a Jesuit priest of the Roman Catholic Church and served in various capacities on the Pine Ridge Indian Reservation in the Roman Catholic Diocese of Rapid City. His entire priestly career was dedicated to ministering among the Oglala Lakota Native Americans. Fr. Manhart’s scholarly work in linguistics helped preserve and disseminate the living, native North American Lakota language. He was a firsthand witness and participant in the Wounded Knee incident of 1973.

== Early life ==
Manhart was born in Omaha, Nebraska, 2 January 1927, the third of twelve children of Paul Ignatius Manhart Sr. and Catherine Eleanor Steinauer Manhart. He attended Creighton Preparatory High School from 1941 to 1945. On his 18th birthday 2 January 1945 he entered the Society of Jesus (SJ) at St. Stanislaus Seminary in Florissant, Missouri. He earned an A.B. (artium baccalaureus) in English and Latin from St. Louis University. In 1952 while still in Jesuit formation, Manhart was assigned to teach at Red Cloud Indian School in Pine Ridge, South Dakota. In 1955 he moved to St. Mary's College (Kansas) where he was ordained a Catholic priest 18 June 1958.

== Published works ==
Beginning in 1902, shortly after arriving in the United States from Germany, Fr. Eugene Buechel, S.J. taught Lakota boys English at the St. Francis Mission school on the Rosebud Indian Reservation. By the time of his death in 1954, Buechel had collected and translated over 28,000 Lakota words, intended to be aggregated into a dictionary. He preserved hundreds of oral histories, cultural objects, and interpretive information that is displayed at the Buechel Memorial Lakota Museum at St. Francis Mission in St. Francis, South Dakota.

Starting in 1955, at the request of Fr. John F. Bryde, principal of Holy Rosary Mission school (now Red Cloud Indian School), Fr. Manhart continued Buechal’s work by compiling, preparing and publishing in 1970 the first edition of Buechel’s Lakota Dictionary. Fr. George P. Casey composed a brief version of Buechel’s A Grammar of Lakota so that it could be included in the dictionary. Five thousand case-bound books were printed, and in 1980, a second print-run of two thousand copies were produced. Buechel's collected Lakota terms were accompanied by their English definitions, pronunciations, parts of speech, examples of usage, and their sources.

Around the time of the Wounded Knee incident of 1973, Fr. Manhart had borrowed Buechel's original manuscript of Lakota Tales and Texts from the Holy Rosary Mission archives with the intention to publish. As a result of the violent occupation, he and two local men, Benjamin White Butterfly and Ruben Mesteth found their office in shambles and the library shelves stripped of all its books—except the Tales and Texts manuscript. The original Lakota manuscript was rescued from destruction and in June 1978, Fr. Manhart published Lakota Tales and Texts. It wasn't until 1993 that Fr. John Paul, superior of Holy Rosary Mission, asked Fr. Manhart (by then a recognized Lakota linguist) to take a sabbatical to translate and publish Buechel’s original manuscripts. After five additional years of effort, Fr. Manhart in 1998 commissioned Tipi Press to publish the two-volume set Lakota Tales and Texts in translation.

Thirty-two years after its original publication, Fr. Manhart in 2002 completed his revision of the Lakota Dictionary to include English translations of the term usages, a second edition published by the University of Nebraska Press. Containing over thirty thousand entries, the Lakota Dictionary remains the most comprehensive dictionary of the Lakota language to date, serving everyone interested in preserving, speaking, and writing the language. Included the 2002 publication, other Lakota speakers contributed to the expanded edition’s collection of Lakota words; credited in the “Word Sources” section.

== Wounded Knee incident ==
On November 1, 1972, one week before the 1972 presidential election between President Richard Nixon and Sen. George McGovern (D-S.D.), 500 to 800 Native Americans members of the American Indian Movement barricaded the entrances to the Bureau of Indian Affairs in downtown Washington (only six blocks from the White House). Wanting to draw attention to the poor treatment by the U.S. government (poor housing, underfunded schools, and health crises) activists demanded a meeting with Nixon and top officials. The siege lasted six days. They called their effort the Trail of Broken Treaties, a nod to the forcible removal in the 1830s of thousands of Native Americans from their homelands during the Trail of Tears.

Grievances lingered until just four months later when the Wounded Knee incident began 27 February 1973, on the Pine Ridge Reservation in South Dakota, when approximately 200 Sioux Native Americans, in a military-style operation organized by Dennis Banks, Carter Camp, Clyde Bellecourt, Russell Means and members of the American Indian Movement, confronted Fr. Manhart at Sacred Heart Catholic Church and (using firearms) took him hostage along with ten other residents of the area (Clive Gildersleeve, Agnes Gildersleeve, Wilber Riegert, Girlie Clark, Bill Cole, Mary Pike, Addrienne Fritz, Jean Fritz, Guy Fritz, Annie Hunts Horse).

The takeover was described by an observer from the press as, “a commando raid in the most accurate sense: well organized, lightning fast, and executed in almost total darkness” (Rapid City Journal, March 1, 1973, p. 1) The Wounded Knee occupation by AIM lasted 71 days during which two Indian activists were killed—one struck in the head by a bullet that also pierced the wall of the Catholic church. At one of the roadblocks, U.S. Marshal Lloyd Grimm was seriously wounded when AIM militant gunfire struck his chest and left through his back. The psychological stress of these events required evacuation to Rushville Hospital unconscious hostage Wilber Riegert (87 years of age), at which Fr. Manhart administered the Anointing of the Sick to him. When offered a chance to leave captivity, Fr. Manhart chose to remain in an effort to serve as a, “buffer between the AIM and government forces and that meaningful negotiations might result.”

During Means’ federal trial, The Denver Post reported, “The priest heard the front door unlocked from the inside. He walked quickly to the altar and observed 15 to 20 persons milling about. Four to six had shotguns and rifles and the others carried bayonets, machetes and clubs.” Means soon entered, and the priest said, “Russell, do you know this is a sacred place?” Means did not answer. In a few minutes he told his men, ‘Take him out of here. Take him to the basement and tie him up.” Thousands of rounds of ammunition were exchanged between AIM members and the FBI from their positions outside the church. After federal officials promised to investigate their complaint, AIM leaders and their supporters ended the occupation on 8 May 1973. On 16 September 1974, After an eight-and-a-half-month trial the U.S. District Court of South Dakota (Fred Joseph Nichol presiding judge) dismissed the charges against Banks and Means for conspiracy and assault because of the U.S. government’s unlawful handling of witnesses and evidence.

== Tekakwitha Conference ==
Fr. Manhart was an invited speaker 3–7 August 1981 at the 42nd Annual Meeting of the Tekakwitha Conference, a Roman Catholic institution originating on the Northern Plains but now national in scope, serving Native Catholics of the United States and Canada. Pastoral concerns relevant to native communities are addressed by invited speakers at an annual event. Since 1939 priests, religious brothers and guest speakers discuss topics ranging from reservation life and Catholic schools to urban relocation, native customs in Catholic worship, native deacons, and native self-determination.

== Writings ==
- Buechel, Fr. Eugene and Manhart S.J., Fr. Paul, Lakota-English Dictionary, 1st ed.: Pine Ridge, South Dakota: Holy Rosary Mission, 1970
- Rigert, Wilber A. with assistance by Fr. Paul Manhart, S.J., Quest for the Pipe of the Sioux, Rapid City, South Dakota, 1975.
- Buechel, Fr. Eugene, Stars, Ivan, Iron Shell, Peter and Manhart S.J., Fr. Paul, Lakota Tales and Texts, Red Cloud Lakota Language and Cultural Center, 1978
- Manhart S.J., Fr. Paul, Lakota Tales and Texts in Translation. 2 vols., Tipi Press, Chamberlain, South Dakota, 1998.
- Buechel, Fr. Eugene and Manhart S.J., Fr. Paul, Lakota-English Dictionary, 1st ed.: Pine Ridge, South Dakota: Holy Rosary Mission, 1970; 2nd ed.: University of Nebraska Press, Lincoln and London, Nebraska, 2002.

== Later years ==
After taking sabbatical semesters in 1993 at Gonzaga University and Creighton University Fr. Manhart returned to Holy Rosary Mission to resume his pastoral duties and continue work on the revised edition of the Lakota Dictionary, published in 2002. With his health declining in 2003, Fr. Manhart moved to the St. Camillus Jesuit Community in Wauwatosa, Wisconsin. He died 1 May 2008 at the age of 81. He was buried at Calvary Cemetery, Milwaukee, Milwaukee County, Wisconsin, 8 May 2008.

== See also ==
- Lakota language
- Lakota mythology
