= Rosebud Hotel =

- U.S. National Register of Historic Places
- Location within South Dakota Location within the United States
- Location: 7 Circle Dr., Rosebud, South Dakota
- Coordinates: 43°13′56″N 100°51′11″W
- Area: less than one acre
- Built: 1879
- NRHP reference No.: 80003734
- Added to NRHP: May 7, 1980

The Rosebud Hotel is a historic former hotel building at 7 Circle Drive in Rosebud, South Dakota, the government center of the Rosebud Indian Reservation. It is a 2 1/2-story wood-frame structure, three bays wide, with a hip roof and multiple chimneys. A single-story hip-roofed porch extends across the central portion of the main facade, sheltering a doorway flanked by sidelight windows. The hotel was built in 1879, one year after the reservation was established, to house visiting government officials and unmarried employees of the Bureau of Indian Affairs. It was converted to apartments in 1937, and later housed as the tribal offices of the Brulé Sioux who live on the reservation.

The building was listed on the National Register of Historic Places in 1980.

== See also ==
- National Register of Historic Places listings in Todd County, South Dakota
