= Spotted Tail =

Sichangu ("Brulé") Sioux chief (1823–1881)

- Siŋté Glešká
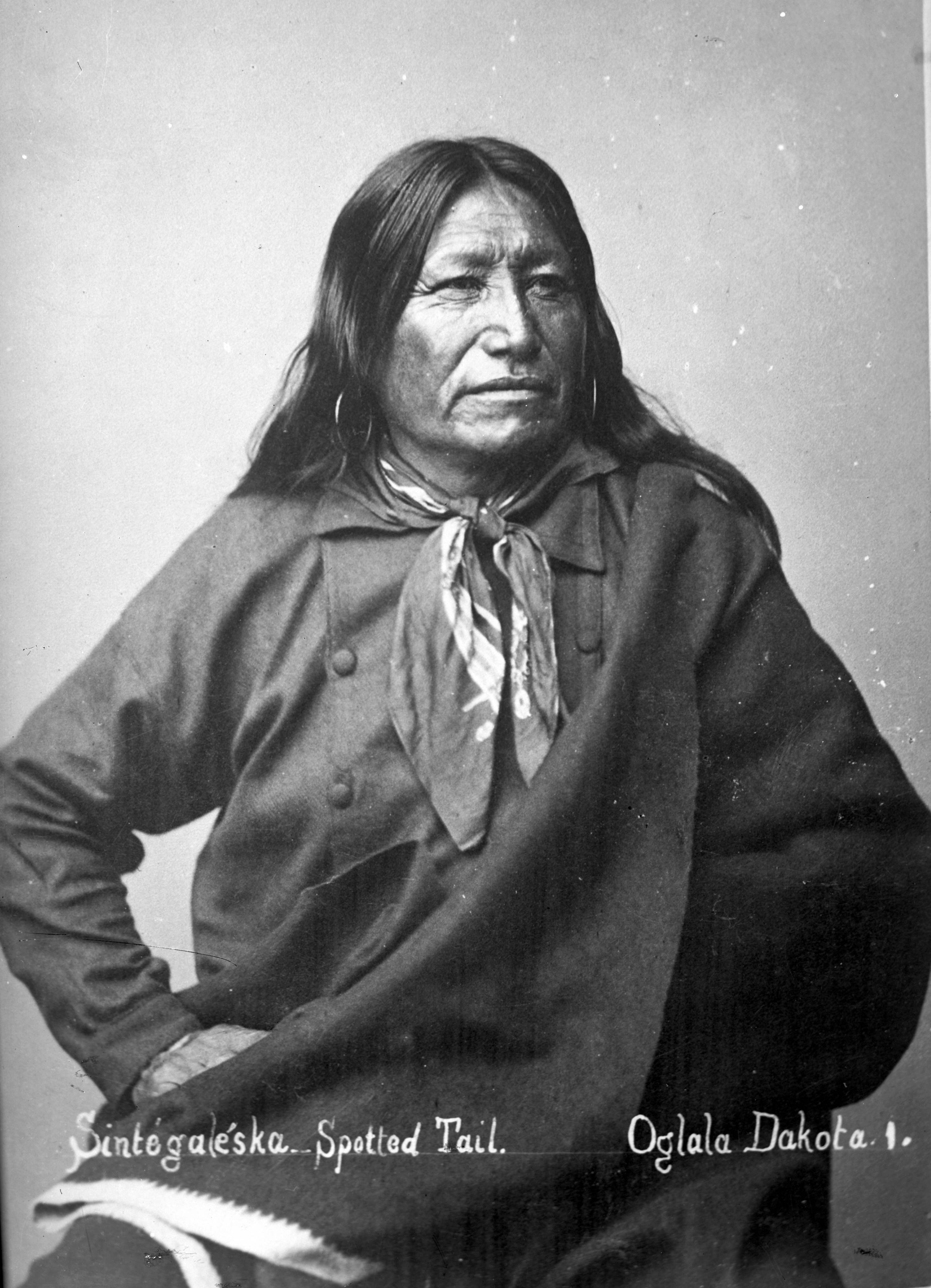
- Chief Spotted Tail

Brulé Lakota leader

Personal details
- Born: Tȟatȟáŋka Napsíča c. 1823 Present-day South Dakota, U.S.
- Died: August 5, 1881 (aged 57–58) South Dakota, U.S.
- Cause of death: Assassinated
- Resting place: Spotted Tail Gravesite, Rosebud, South Dakota, U.S.
- Spouse: Julia Black Lodge Spotted Tail
- Children: Daughter Mni-Akuwin (Water Bringing Woman), also known as Hinzinwin (Fallen Leaf), sometimes called Ah-ho-appa (Wheat Flour)
- Parents: Cunka or Tangle Hair (father); Walks-with-the-Pipe (mother)
- Relatives: Iron Between Horns, Kills Enemy (sisters)
- Education: Sinte Gleska University named for him, 1971
- Known for: Statesman and warrior, with interests in peace and education

Military service
- Battles/wars: Battles with Ute Tribe; Grattan Confrontation; Battle of Ash Hollow; Battle of Julesburg; Battle of Mud Springs; Battle of Rush Creek

Spotted Tail (Siŋté Glešká, Lakota: [sɪ̃ˈtɛ ɡlɛʃˈka]; birth name Tȟatȟáŋka Napsíča [tˣaˈtˣə̃ka napˈsɪtʃa], 'Jumping Buffalo'; (Note: Ingham (2013) uses ⟨t‘⟩ and ⟨c⟩ to represent New Lakota Dictionary's ⟨tȟ⟩ and ⟨č⟩.) c. 1823 – August 5, 1881) was a Sichangu Lakota tribal chief. Famed as a great warrior since his youth, warring on Ute, Pawnee and Absaroke ('Crow'), and having taken a leading part in the Grattan Massacre, he led his warriors in the Colorado and Platte River uprising (Spotted Tail's War) after the massacre perpetrated by John M. Chivington's Colorado Volunteers on the peaceful Cheyenne and Arapaho camping on Sand Creek (November 29, 1864), but declined to participate in Red Cloud's War.

After spending almost two years as a prisoner in Fort Leavenworth following the Grattan affair, Spotted Tail was able to speak the English language well, and to deal with the "Wasichu" (white men) without an interpreter, whom he did not trust. He had become convinced of the futility of making war to oppose the white incursions into his homeland; he became a statesman, speaking for peace and defending the rights of his tribe by using his knowledge of “wasichu” language and system to increase his political capability to hinder their tricks and deceptions.

He made several trips to Washington, D.C. in the 1870s to represent his people, and was noted for his interest in bringing education to the Sioux. General Anson Mills, who knew Spotted Tail well, called him "a fine-looking man, with engaging manners, perfectly loyal to the government, a lover of peace, knowing no good could come to his people from war," a man who had both a high respect for and confidence in U.S. Army officers as well as a good sense of humor. He was shot in the back and killed by Crow Dog, a Sichangu Lakota subchief, in 1881 for reasons which have been disputed.

== Early years ==
Spotted Tail was born about 1823 in the White River country west of the Missouri River in present-day South Dakota. He was given the birth name of Jumping Buffalo. Two of his sisters, Iron Between Horns and Kills Enemy, were married to the elder Crazy Horse (later known as "Worm"), in what was traditional Sioux practice for elite men. Spotted Tail was the uncle of the famous warrior Crazy Horse, which meant he was a relative of the notable Touch the Clouds as well. The young man took his warrior name, Spotted Tail, after receiving a gift of a raccoon tail from a white trapper; he sometimes wore a raccoon tail in his war bonnet. During the previous 40 years, the Lakota or Teton Sioux had moved from present-day Minnesota and eastern South Dakota to areas west of the Missouri. They had differentiated into several sub-tribes or bands, including the Saône (including the Sihasapa, his father's sub-tribe, the Minneconjou, the Itazipcho, the Hunkpapa, the Oohenonpa), Sichangu ("Brulé") and Oglala. During this time the people adopted the use of horses and expanded their range in hunting the buffalo across their wide grazing patterns.

== Marriage and family ==
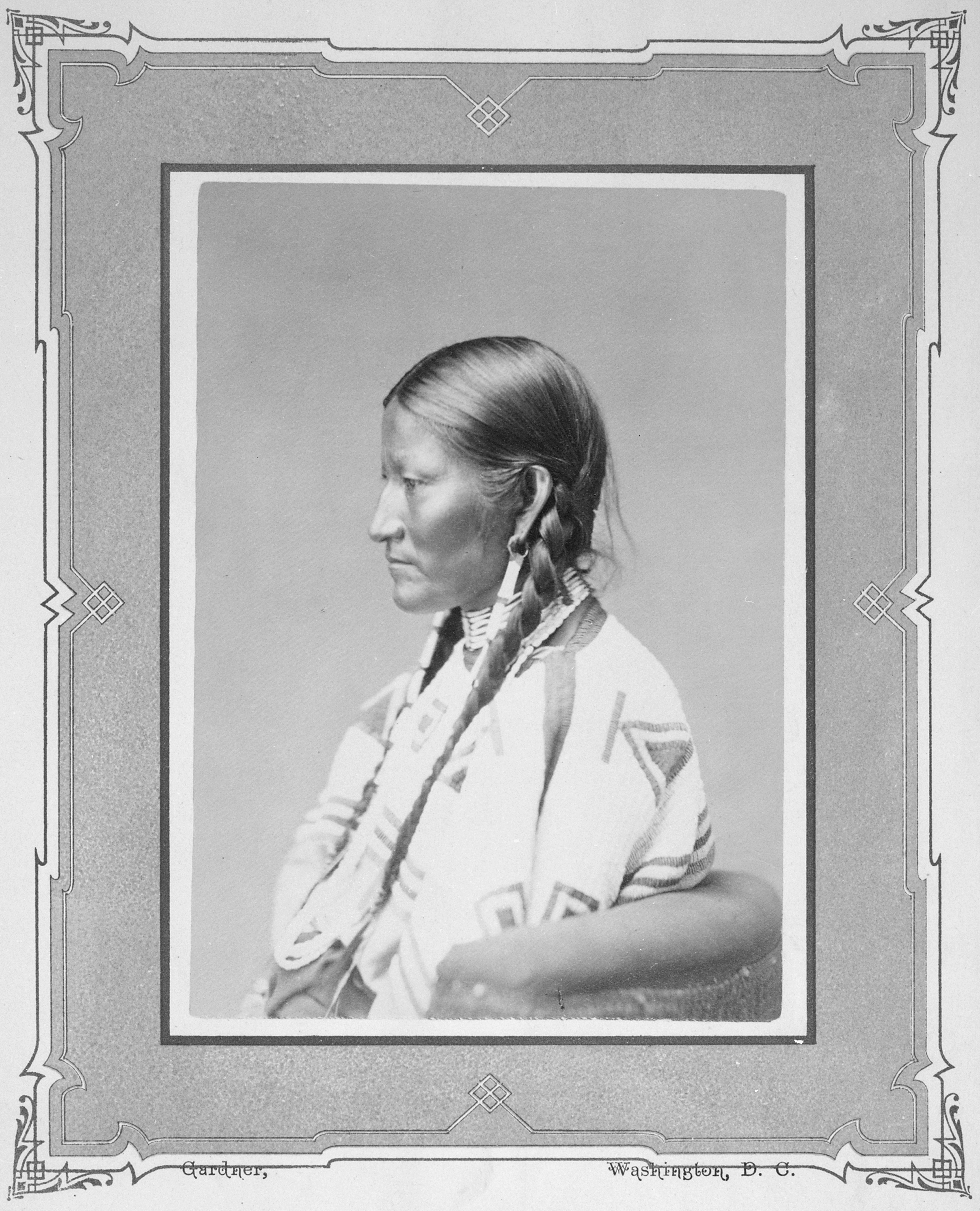
Wife of Spotted Tail

Spotted Tail married and had children. He gained his first wife in 1842, after a deadly fight against chief Mahto Wakuwa ("Running Bear"), and, the killed chief being a famous warrior, young (not even twenty years old) Spotted Tail's reputation probably greatly increased.

Spotted Tail and his family spent some time living in the village outside Fort Laramie, during which Eugene Fitch Ware, an officer at the fort, wrote that Spotted Tail's daughter, variously referred to as Mni-Akuwin (Water Bringing Woman), Ah-ho-appa (a non-Lakota word said to mean Wheat Flour), and Hinzinwin (Fallen Leaf), "... was one of those individuals found in all lands, at all places, and among all people; she was misplaced." He suggested that she adopted some European-American practices, and that she was thought to be secretly in love with one of the officers at the fort, although she was a young child when she lived there. When she was dying of tuberculosis in 1866, Mni-Akuwin made her father promise that she would be buried beside her grandfather on a hillside overlooking Fort Laramie. The entire garrison at the post helped Spotted Tail to honor her request by arranging for a ceremonial funeral, including a Christian service and Sioux ceremony. Many years later, Spotted Tail had her remains transported to the Rosebud Indian Agency in South Dakota and re-interred.

Mni-Akuwin was, in accordance with her wishes and those of her living relatives, re-interred a second time and moved back to the original site of her burial at Fort Laramie, Wyoming (by this time Fort Laramie National Historic Site) on June 25th, 2005.

== Grattan and Ash Hollow battles ==
In the late summer of 1854, about 4,000 Sichangu and Oglala were camped near Fort Laramie, in accordance with the terms of the Treaty of 1851. On August 17, a cow belonging to a Mormon traveling on the nearby Oregon Trail strayed and was killed by a visiting Miniconjou Lakota warrior named High Forehead. Lt. Hugh Fleming, the senior officer of the small garrison, consulted with the chief, Matȟó Wayúhi or Scattering Bear, to discuss the loss of livestock, the officer was evidently unaware, or chose to ignore, that such matters were, by the terms of the Treaty of 1851, to be handled by the local Indian Agent, in this case John Whitfield, who was due to arrive within days with annuities with which restitution could be made. Aware that the matter was not under the purview of the military, Scattering Bear still attempted to negotiate, offering a horse from his personal herd or a cow from the tribe's herd but the cow's owner persisted in demanding $25 instead. Lt. Fleming asked the Sioux to arrest High Forehead and deliver him to the fort, which Conquering Bear refused; he had no authority over the Miniconjou and did not want to violate his people's tradition of hospitality. The day's talk ended in stalemate.

On August 19, 1854, Second Lieutenant John Lawrence Grattan, of the U.S. 6th Infantry Regiment, a recent graduate of West Point and supernumerary waiting for a vacancy in the regiment, led an armed detachment into the Indian encampment to take custody of High Forehead and bring him back to the fort. The aspiring Grattan, eager to gain a military reputation, was inexperienced and described as contemptuous of the Lakotas' ability as warriors. This was his first (and only) encounter with the Sioux. By the time the detachment reached the encampment (hosting some 1,200 warriors among the total 4,800 population), Lucian Auguste, Grattan's interpreter, was intoxicated from drinking along the way, as he feared the encounter; the Lakotas disliked him and he disliked them, moreover he spoke only broken Dakota, and had little grasp of other dialects. As they entered the encampment, he began to taunt the Sioux, calling their warriors women, and saying the soldiers were not there to talk, but to kill them all, and failed to fully or accurately translate Conquering Bear and Grattan's comments; according to the trader James Bordeaux, Lt. Grattan began to realize the risk and stopped to discuss the situation with the trader; Bordeaux advised him to talk directly with Conquering Bear and let him handle the situation, and Grattan seemed to not understand and continued on into the encampment, going first to the lodge of High Forehead, whom he ordered to surrender to the US forces. High Forehead said he would die first. Then Grattan went to Conquering Bear, saying the Sioux should arrest the guilty party and turn him over; but Conquering Bear refused and tried to negotiate, offering a horse as compensation for the cow. Conquering Bear asked for the trader Bordeaux to act as interpreter, as the Sioux trusted him and his language ability. Called by the Sioux, Bordeaux rode to the meeting place; later he said he could see the situation was out of hand; as Grattan persisted in pressing Conquering Bear, numerous Sioux warriors moved into flanking positions around the soldiers. Ending the discussion, Grattan was walking back to his column, when a nervous soldier fired his gun, shooting a Sioux, and the warriors started shooting arrows while leaders tried to take control. Conquering Bear was mortally wounded and died nine days later near the Niobrara River. The Sichangu Lakota warriors, led by Spotted Tail, then a rising war chief within his people, quickly killed Grattan, 11 of his men, and the interpreter. A group of some 18 soldiers retreated on foot trying to reach some rocks for defense, but they were cut off and killed by overcoming warriors led by Red Cloud, a rising war chief within the Oglala Sioux. One soldier survived the massacre but later died of his wounds. Conquering Bear was the only Lakota who was killed. The Sioux spared Bordeaux, both because he was married to a Sichangu Sioux woman, and because he had a friendly relationship with the tribes. The enraged warriors "rampaged throughout the night, swearing to attack other whites." They rode against Fort Laramie the next morning but withdrew; they looted the trading post but did not harm Bordeaux. On the third day after the US attack, the Sichangu and Oglala abandoned the camp on the North Platte River and returned to their respective hunting grounds. On the fourth day, the military asked Bordeaux to arrange a burial party and found that the slain soldiers had been ritually mutilated.

The U.S. press called the event the "Grattan Massacre", and reports generally ignored the US soldiers' instigation of the event by their failure first, to leave it up to the Indian agent to settle the matter, as called for in the treaty, and second, shooting chief Conquering Bear in the back; punctually, when news of the fight reached the War Department, officials started planning retaliation to punish the Sioux. Secretary of War Jefferson Davis characterized the incident as "the result of a deliberately formed plan.

Col. William S. Harney was recalled from Paris in April 1855 and sent to Fort Kearny, where he assembled a command of 600 troopers, consisting of men from the 6th Infantry, 10th Infantry, 4th Artillery, and his own 2nd US Dragoons. In all he had four mounted companies led by Lt. Col. Philip St. George Cooke and five companies of infantry under Maj. Albemarle Cady. They set out on August 24, 1855, to find the Sioux and exact retribution. Harney was quoted as saying, "By God, I'm for battle—no peace."

Warned by the Indian agent Thomas S. Twiss that the army had put a force in the field, half of the Lakota camped north of the Platte went into Fort Laramie for protection as "friendlies". The other half, generally led by Conquering Bear's successor Little Thunder, remained at large. They considered themselves peaceful but knew that Harney was out with a force. They continued to harbor warriors sought by the Army. Harney engaged them in the Battle of Ash Hollow (also known as the Battle of Bluewater Creek) on September 3, 1855. U.S. soldiers killed 86 Sichangu Sioux, half of them women and children, in present-day Garden County, Nebraska. The New York Times and other newspapers recounted the battle as a massacre because so many women and children were killed. The village of 230 persons was caught between an assault by the infantry and a blocking force by the cavalry. Spotted Tail, principal war chief of the Sichangu, surprised and initially unarmed, was seriously wounded four times having had two bullets pass through his chest, but reportedly managed to kill or wound 13 "long knives" (white soldiers).

Harney returned to Fort Laramie with 70 prisoners, most of them women and children, including Spotted Tail's mother, wife and three children and Iron Shell (Maza Pangeska)'s wife. To make the Sichangu Women and children free, Harney claimed the delivery of the leaders of Grattan Fight, and Spotted Tail, Red Leaf (Waba Sha), Long Chin (Iku Hanska) and, some days later, Standing Elk (Hehaka Najin) and Red Plume (Wiyaka Sha) went to Fort Pierre escorted by Iron Shell and the whole Sichangu crowd. On October 25 the three warriors sought by the expedition surrendered, were held for a year at Fort Leavenworth (where Spotted Tail was reached by his wife several months later), and were released. Harney ordered the tribes to send representatives to a treaty council at Fort Pierre in March 1856, where a treaty was signed on terms dictated by the War Department. Twiss tried to undermine the treaty, and Harney had him removed from office, although he did not have the authority to do so. Commissioner of Indian Affairs George W. Manypenny successfully lobbied the Senate to reject the treaty, and Twiss was reinstated. Harney's actions against the Lakota restrained them for nearly ten years. The US Army was soon involved in the American Civil War, and did not have resources to fight on the Great Plains. The Lakota could concentrate on their wars against old enemies as the Pawnee (favored Sichangu target) and Absaroke (favored Oglala target). In the spring-summer 1860 (April 10, May 19, May 21, June 22, July 5, July 11, September 1, September 14), Lakota (mostly Spotted Tail's Sichangu), Cheyenne and Arapaho repeatedly assaulted the Pawnee villages on Loup Fork (three villages, two of them inhabited by the Skidi and the third jointly by Chawi, Kitkehahki and Pitahuerat, placed on a cliff and protected on the other side by a wall of clay); the Pawnee asked the Army for protection, and, in August 1860, Captain Alfred Sully reached the Agency with a small detachment and a howitzer, which was placed overstanding north the villages; when, Captain Sully being temporarily on duty at Fort Kearny, on September 14, 250 Lakota braves (likely Spotted Tail's Sichangu) attacked one of the villages, the Pawnee stood at defence and receiving reinforcements from the other two villages and from the Army encampment, suffering an unknown number of losses, but killing 13 Teton. In the summer and fall 1862 Spotted Tail at least three times led his Sichangu braves against the hated Pawnee, two times (June - on the Chawi, Kitkehahki, Pitahurat - and August – on the Skidi –) attacking their encampments, and fighting a company of 2nd Nebraska Volunteers Cavalry, and the third time (September) attacking the Pawnee agency too.

== Spotted Tail's war and Indian uprising: Background ==
On June 8, 1864, US Government representatives met several Teton chiefs, who were called in at Cottonwood by Maj. George N. O'Brien speaking for Gen- Robert B. Mitchell, the new military commander along the Overland Road, pretending them to leave the Platte River, where the Cheyenne and the US Army were clashing, but Sinte Galeshka (who was to succeed Wakinyan Chika as Sichangu principal chief) and Nomkahpa (Two Strike), speaking for the Sichangu, and Owa Shicha (Bad Wound), Owa Chika [*] (Little Wound) e Zoolah (Whistler), speaking for the Oglala, did not accept the proposal, who claimed that the Platte River was Teton country.

During the summer, several raids were performed by young Teton warriors along North Platte and Sweetwater Creek against white intruders. In July, a wagon train was attacked by the Oglala near the Platte River, kidnapping a woman. In August, a Cheyenne and Teton Dakota party, including Nomkahapa and his Sichangu, attacked another train, killing 11 men, burning the wagons and kidnapping a woman and a child, and, in the Little Blue Creek Valley, an Indian party (likely Teton Dakota) raided farms and wagons, kidnapping two women and three children at Liberty Farm. He Isnala and his son Mahpiua Icahtagya led a Minneconjou party of 30 men against Fort Laramie, stealing the whole stock. After the Little Blue Valley raid many settlers left the Nebraska border and General Mitchell went upstream of the Platte River and the Republican River leading a strong military column, but he did not find the Indians, camping all together in a large village on the Solomon River. Between August 15 to September 24, the way to Denver was interrupted, making Latham Station the last stop of the coach on the South Platte. This led mail having forced to be shipped through the Panama Channel or California, and even wagon trains carrying supplies dared to enter Indian country but only forming large convoys. Before wagoners were forced to give out, while the Teton Dakota were ravaging Nebraska roaming the countries east of Fort Kearny, the Cheyenne were roaming the countries west of Fort Kearny and the Arapaho those farther west and the South Platte River to Denver. Governor Evans asked for the 2nd Colorado Volunteers Cavalry, then busy in Kansas, to enroll a new 3rd Colorado Volunteers Cavalry, whose soldiers subscribed for 100 days, commanded by Colonel John Chivington. On August 18, Captain Mussey and his detachment engaged a party of Teton buffalo hunters but were routed by overcoming Cheyenne and Teton warriors, who reached and killed two soldiers. On October 22, Colonel R. R. Livingston sent cavalry patrols to set fire to a 200-mile long strip of prairie along the Platte River, unsuccessfully trying to keep the Indians out of the area.

== Spotted Tail's war and Indian uprising in Colorado ==
The Cheyenne and Arapaho massacre performed by John Chivington at Sand Creek (November 29, 1864) provoked the former's fury and their allies the Teton, who, in December united their camps on the Cherry Creek and called the war on the wasi'chu. In January 1865, Sinte Galeshka, Nomkahpa, Palani Wicakte, Tatanka Yotake and other Teton leaders joined the Cheyenne to avenge the Sand Creek massacre on Julesburg (January 7) scalping those who didn't put themselves in safety, and attacking again, sacking and burning the town, several weeks later (February 2), keeping to raid the country along the South Platte River destroying farms and stagecoach stations and plundering so many horses and cows to decide to hold only the best of them and free the others.

The Sand Creek survivors had joined the Cheyenne camping near the Smoky Hill River, and had called the Teton, Dakota and the Northern Arapaho to take part in the war against the wasi'chu. The Cheyenne, Northern Arapaho, Sichangu Teton Dakota (led by Sinte Galeshka and Nomkahpa) and southern Oglala Teton Dakota (led by Palani Wicakte and Mahto Yotake) had camped together on Cherry Creek, while General Sibley's troops were getting together near Fort Lyon: after several raids along the Platte River the Indians had collected a force of about 1,000 warriors, led by Sinte Galeshka, and others. On January 5 (or 6th) 1865, they started moving to Julesburg, reaching the city's vicinities at night on January 6. On January 1 a small party of Cheyenne warriors assailed some soldiers outside Fort Rankin's (later named Fort Sedgwick) palisades, about one mile from Julesburg, garrisoned by a company of the 7th Iowa Volunteers Cavalry, attracting a detachment led by Captain N. J. O'Brien and some civilians (altogether 60 men including 38 troopers) outside the fort to an ambush and missing the complete success due to the excessive haste of some young warriors to charge before the encirclement had been closed. O'Brien and his men tried to retreat, losing 14 troopers and four civilians. A coach filled with crew and passengers entered the fort just before the Indians reached the palisades. The Cheyenne and their allies sacked Julesburg, then went back to Cherry Creek in the evening, triumphally reaching their camps on January 10. General Mitchell immediately collected the available troops (500 men and several artillery guns) at Camp Cottonwood, calling them back from the stagecoach trail, and on January 16 marched on the Republican River, as far as the Cherry Creek, already deserted.

On January 19 the Indians, having already moved on White Butte Creek, started again on January 26 to the South Platte River, crossing it on January 28 near Harlow's Ranch, planning a big raid (after a sequence of raids along the South Platte River on farms and stagecoach stations, the warriors crossed the river having plundered so meny horses and cows that they decided to keep only the best and relinquish the other stock) before moving towards the Powder River on February 2, and joining Northern Cheyenne and other Oglala Teton Dakota; Motavato, with 80 Cheyenne tepee, went to the Arkansas River. On January 16 Mitchell left Camp Cottonwood (about 100 miles from Julesburg) to search for Indian encampments on the Republican Fork, but returned on January 26, having useless weakened troopers and horses without having found the village on the White Butte Creek; Mitchell dispersed his troops along the trails to protect farms and stagecoach stations, and finally was replaced by General G. M. Dodge, who ordered Col. R. R. Livingston to collect his forces again and move against the “hostiles”. The "Ohio Volunteers", under General Patrick E. Connor, were ordered to counter the Cheyenne and Arapaho and their allies Teton Dakota, Kiowa and Comanche in Colorado due to the lack of regular troops, busy on the Civil War battle grounds, while the warehouses of Fort Benton, Fort Lincoln, Fort Laramie, Fort Harker, Fort Leavenworth, Fort Supply, Fort Union were massively filled of supplies, weapons and ammunitions. Sinte Galeshka and the other chiefs decided to move on the Powder River and join the “hostile” northern Teton divisions, procuring at wasichu expenses what necessary to deal with a long and extraordinary winter walking of a column numbering 1,000 families, including women children and older people, who much hardly could get supplies along the way: farms and warehouses of the white intruders should provide all the necessary.

The balance of Indian revenge in January to March 1865, was heavy to white people as for human losses (at least 24 soldiers and 36 civilians were killed, and at least two women and one child were kidnapped), and very heavy as for material damages and lost stock. Allied to Arapaho and Cheyenne, the Sichangu Teton Dakota, under Sinte Galeshka and Nomkahpa, and the Oglala Teton Dakota under Palani Wicakte, terrified white intruders along the South Platte River, attacking wagon trains, stagecoach stations and military outposts, razed to the ground Julesburg, left just in time by its inhabitants to corral themselves in Fort Rankin, and isolated Denver for months.

In little more than one month occurred: killing 15 soldiers and four civilians at Julesburg on January 7; destruction of Beaver Creek stagecoach station, attack to Godfrey's Ranch, destruction of Wisconsin Ranch on January 14; destruction of Morrison's American Ranch, with the killing of seven white men and disappearing and presumable kidnapping of a woman and a child on January 15; burning of Gittrell's Ranch on January 25; burning of Lillian Springs Ranch, attack on Washington Ranch on January 27 with the burning, the killing of two civilians and a kidnapping of a woman at Harlow's Ranch, as well as destruction of the Buffalo Springs Ranch and of Spring Hill Station occurred on January 28; burning and destruction of 100 tons of hay, stealing of mules and about 500 cows at Moore's Ranch, near Valley Station – garrisoned by a Cavalry company – and wounding of two troopers of a patrol left to recover some animals on January 28–29; killing, by a party of young Cheyenne warriors, of nine troopers belonging to the 3rd Colorado Volunteers Cavalry at Prairie on January 29; destruction of the stagecoach station at Beaver Creek on February 1; burning of Buler's Ranch, burning of Julesburg with the demolition of a telegraph line, capture of a 22 wagon train on February 2: killing of three civilians at Washington Ranch on February 4, killing of four civilians at Lillian Springs Ranch on February 7; killing of three civilians at Gittrell's Ranch on February 9; killing of one civilian at Moore's Ranch and attack on three wagon trains on February 11; killing of nine civilians in various places on March 2; killing of three civilians and burning of the town at Julesburg on [March 16]).

On February 2, the Indians left the South Platte to the North Platte and a party of about 1,000 warriors (including Tashunka Witko), a time again, was led by Sinte Galeshka, with Nomkahpa and Palani Wicakte, to Julesburg: useless they managed to attract to the open ground the soldiers, showing the usual decoy parties, then, undisputed masters of the ground, sacked again and burned the town, camping in front of Fort Rankin and Cheyenne and Arapaho capturing two large wagons (loaded the one with minery machinery and the other with liquors) near Gittrell's Ranch ruins, nine miles away Julesburg.

On February 3, Cheyenne and Arapaho left Julesburg to go back to the village on the Lodgepole Creek, but the Teton Dakota remained feasting in front of Fort Rankin, breaking down the telegraph line and raiding 1,500 heads of stock between Julesburg and Washington Ranch; on February 4 the Cheyenne stole the cows and 20 horses at Mud Springs Station, on Muddy Spring Creek, where was a small military garrison who asked for help, telegraphically, to Camp Mitchell, 55 miles away, and Fort Laramie; lt. William Ellsworth left Camp Mitchell leading 36 troopers of 11th Ohio Volunteers Cavalry, reaching Mud Springs on February 5, but, charged by the Indians and forced to fortify in the corral, the detachment, perhaps short of ammunitions, escaped his doom by making the horses and mules to run away and attract the warriors’ attention and distract them from the soldiers.

On February 6 arrived at Mud Springs the regiment's commander, Col. William O. Collins, who had left from Fort Laramie leading 25 men and 100 more after them: the Indians charged on the vanguard and then engaged the bulk of the overcoming column, forcing the troops to repair inside the ranch and the corral while about 200 warriors were trying to clear off hitting the troopers with swarms of arrows from the hills, finally the soldiers succeeded in reaching the top of a hill and entrenching themselves, and the Indians went away and moved the camp to the other side of the Platte River. Collins followed the track of the Cheyenne advancing in the Platte Valley, where they attacked the troops on February 7. Having entrenched in the wagon circle, the cavalry tried a sortie, loosing about half of the troop in front of the Indian warriors and repairing inside the wagon circle again, fighting until the evening, when the Indians went away, satisfied for the hard defeat imposed on the "Ohio Volunteers". Livingston and his troops reached Julesburg after the Indians had destroyed the town and had left to go back to their large camp, ready to move to the Powder River. Dodge tried to take credit for the Teton “withdrawal” as a consequence of the Livingston column approaching, but this false claim did not avert him to be replaced by General Patrick E. Connor.

== Trust and betrayal ==
In April 1865 Sinte Galeshka, camped with his Sichangu on the Tongue River jointly with the Northern Arapaho, contacted by Government emissaries (in the meanwhile, on March 3, Vital Jerrott had replaced the disliked John Loree as Indian agent for the Upper Platte), appeared at Fort Laramie with 60 tepee (April 14) and settled near the fort, collecting a camp of 185 tepee jointly with Waba Sha's and I Tanka's Waglukhe and a fraction of Mahto Ohanko's Wagmezayuha Sichangu, while the other Wagmezayuha fraction, led by Blotahunka Tanka, went to join Tashunka Kokipapi's [*] and Mahpiua Luta's Oglala on the Powder River; an abnormal treaty subscribed by Genn. W. S. Harney and J. B. Sanborn granted to Dakota, Cheyenne and Arapaho the country between the Black Hills, the Rocky Mountains and the Yellowstone River, and forbid white people even the mere transit through that country; but a new crisis was triggered because of the arrival into the Indian territory of a column of 500 cavalrymen led by Col. Thomas Moonlight, with several artillery guns; in May Moonlight's troops, scouting for them Jim Bridger, trespassed the Platte River reaching the Wind River, but, not having followed Bridger's directions they came into boundless snowy spaces and harsh snow storms, so they went back to the Platte River being watched over by a party of Teton warriors led by Tashunka Witko, and the Oglala stole 22 horses loosing some men. On May 30, 1865, Gen. Connor was put in command of the newly established Plains Military District, having arrived at Julesburg on May 15, after conferred with gen. H. Dodge and immediately beginning to prepare an expedition into the Powder River and Yellowstone River country: a column led by col. Nelson Cole coming rom Columbus, Nebraska, should pass north of the Black Hills, another one led by col. Samuel Walker, from Fort Laramie with about 600 men and 16° Kansas Volunteers Cavalry's baggage train, should pass through the Black Hills, and the last one, with a 7° Iowa Volunteers Cavalry's unit, 2° California Volunteers Cavalry, a signal unit, maj. Frank North and capt. Luther North "Pawnee Battalion", with a company of 95 scouts, a unit of about a hundred Omaha and Winnebago scouts, came to Fort Laramie waiting to enter the Indian territory. In the late spring a Mrs. Lucinda Eubanks and her son, captured in August 1864 on the Little Blue River, Kansas, were ransomed by Ite Nonpa (Two Faces), a friendly Oglala Teton chief who, on advisement of I Tanka (Big Mouth), chief of the Waglukhe Sichangu/Oglala (“Laramie Loafers"), went to Fort Laramie to free the two captives in the hands of the military authorities; along the way Ite Nonpa's folk were taken over by I Tanka's Indian Police, which, along the way again, captured Si Sapa (Black Foot)’s Oglala band too, and the Waglukhe policemen drove both groups to Fort Laramie; being absent col. Moonlight, fort's commander, the officer in charge, fully drunk, made the two Teton chiefs hanged. While the summer was beginning military authorities decided to transfer the Teton Dakota peacefully camped near Fort Laramie, and deport them to Fort Kearny, and ordered to arrest many chiefs and warriors; deported Teton (1.500 to 2.000 people, including Ite Nonpa’ and Si Sapa’, I Tanka’, Mahto Ohanko and Wakinyan Chika’ bands, object - especially the girls and young women – of every kind of abuses by the military escort) and the troops assigned to their surveillance along the trail (a 130 men detachment of the 7° Iowa Cavalry under capt. William D. Fouts) reached Horse Creek on July 11 and camped on the two opposite shores: led by Sinte Galeshka and Wakinyan Chika's and Ite Nonpa's sons, and secretly provided of weapons, deprted Sichangu and Oglala mutinied assailing Fouts and the guarding troopers and killing the officer, then Sinte Galeshka and his warriors rose facing the detachment led by capt. J. Wilcox, which was trying to cross Horse Creek, and allowed the families to ford the Platte River and regain their liberty; only a few families remained in the hands of the Iowa Volunteers and were used as human shields until the warriors gave up and left; Fouts and four more troopers were killed and seven were wounded, and Indian Police, led by Charlie Elliston, defected; according to the military report, four traditionally friendly chiefs should have been killed in a fight among Lakota warriors just before the uprising, but truly one only Teton was killed, a crippled prisoner slaughtered and scalped py the soldiers after the fight. The freed Lakota went to the Powder River, where they were furnished with horses, cows, tepee and everything necessary, and where they spent winter forming a camp of more than 1,000 tepee; Moonlight with his troops, cautiously and leisurely, kept their trail until the White Earth River, where the Teton stampeded cavalry horses and stepped away undisturbed while the soldiers, compacted their ranks, were standing at defense.

== Warring again from Powder to Platte Rivers: summer 1865 ==
In the summer 1865 gen. Connor decided to expel the Indians from the territory north of the Platte River, therefore organizing his troops in three columns: (Cole, marching from Nebraska to the Black Hills; Walker, marching from Fort Laramie to the Black Hills; Connor, marching towardsl Montana along the Bozeman Trail); Connor's orders were “to kill every male Indian older then 12 years” (and it is doubtful that officers and troopers would ask for any Indian identity documents); from east, along the Powder River, was approaching, on the way to Montana, a column of gold seekers, mostly veterans of the Civil War, organized by col. Sawyers. Pawnee auxiliaries were authorized to hunt every Dakota and keep for themselves his horses, therefore they killed several "Loafers" Lakota, provoking Sinte Galeshkas and the Sichangus – who had returned recently again some Pawnee women captured some time before, giving with the women horses and other gifts -, and they threatened a fierce and bloody vengeance. In July a party of 50 Minneconjou braves, led by Kanku Wakantuya ("Long Backbone") raided for horses an Absaroke village; then the same Kanku Wakantuya, with 50 warriors, went raiding the Bozeman Trail, assailing an Omaha patrol scouting for the Army, killing three and stealing some horses of the military encampment. And in July ordered his troops to go into the Indian ruled country: received the order to start, the 16° Kansas Volunteers Cavalry mutinied, and Walker to set down the rebellion, had to line up other troops ready to fire on the rebels, therefore the column left Fort Laramie on July 5; Connor crossed the Platte River on August 2, with 675 men, moving to the Powder River, where he stopped on August 11 and began to establish Camp Connor (later replaced with Fort Reno) 25 miles from the mouth of Crazy Woman's Fork; a further column, composed by civilians goldseekers, mostly veterans, led by James A. Sawyers was moving towards Montana from east; gen. Sully, with his troops, reached Fort Rice on July 13 (greeting cannon-shots fired by col. Dimon made the 250 Hunkpapa, Sihasapa and Yanktonai camping along the river near the fort panic-stricken; hardly they were persuaded the troops had no hostile intentions, but 130 more families - including Tatanka Yotanka's group – who were approaching the fort turned back to their villages). During ten months (May–December) Powder River country was impassable to white people: 47 servicemen and 109 civilians were killed and 16 women were captured. On July 26, 1865, about 1,000 (or, according other statement, 3,000) Teton Lakota, Northern Cheyenne and Hotamitaniu ("Dog Soldiers") Cheyenne, (led by Woquini, Tahmelepashme, Mahpiua Luta, Tashunka Kokipapi, - credited as present by the Cheyenne half-breed George Bent - and several others among the most important chiefs, as Sinte Galeshka - who, coming to Fort Laramie on a peace parley in the spring 1866, would deny to have taken part in the battle -, Kanku Wakantuya, Maza Pangeska, Nomkahpa, Palani Wicakte, Wahacanka Sapa, Mixaso Ska, Hehaka Galeshka, Mahpiua Icahtagya, [Young] Tashunkakokipapi, Shunka Bloka, Tashunka Witko, Chancu Tanka) attacked Platte Bridge Station, a post on the North Platte River garrisoned by an 11° Ohio Volunteers Cavalry battalion under maj. Martin Anderson; having uselessly tried to attract the troops outside the palizades, the warriors fell back on a five wagons military train and its escort of 25 troopers belonging to 11° Kansas Volunteers under sgt. Amos Custard, moving to the outpost, and a platoon of 25 more troopers belonging to the same 11° Kansas Volunteers (including a detachment of 12 men under cpl. Henry Grimm escorting the mail delivery) under lt. Caspar Collins (11° Ohio Volunteers) was sent to the rescue: before being rejected by the outpost howitzer, the Indians (whose final losses altogether amounted to eight killed and many more wounded) destroyed Custard's detachment, killing 23 troopers while only two escaped, and overwhelmed Collins' and Grimm's, killing the officer and four troopers and wounding nine; therefore the Lakota turned back to the Powder River.

== Treaty of Fort Laramie ==
In the fall 1865 Spotted Tail and Red Cloud rejected two peace messages sent to them by Dakota Territory Governor Newton Edmunds and Gen. Henry H. Sibley by way of Kawawesna Tanka (Big Ribbs) and, later, I Tanka (Big Mouth), two friendly chiefs camping near Fort Laramie, but the winter 1865-1866 was a hard one, supplies in the villages went low and many horses died, so several bands began to be better inclined towards peace proposals. In March 1866 Spotted Tail communicated his daughter was sick and he was to come and carry her to Laramie. Spotted Tail arrived on March 9 and Red Cloud on March 14; Fallen Leaf died along the way to the fort, and when she was dying, the girl made her father promise that she would be buried on a hillside overlooking Fort Laramie: the entire garrison at the post helped Spotted Tail to honor her request by arranging for a ceremonial funeral, including a Christian service and Sioux ceremony. Many years later, Spotted Tail had her remains transported to the Rosebud Indian Agency in South Dakota and re-interred. The two great chiefs and their people received gifts and were ready for peace, scheduling a meeting with Government Commissary N.G. Taylor for June 5 and then, waiting for more Lakota and Cheyenne bands, for June 16, but, on June 16, col. Henry B, Carrington's arrival, with the 700 men of his 18° Infantry, moving to the Bozeman trail and camping at 5 miles from the fort, provoked Red Cloud and Old Man Feared-for-his-Horses to leave the council; Spotted Tail and other chiefs subscribed a treaty on June 27. In May, while waiting for Taylor, Spotted Tail, now at peace with the Wasichu, left to make war on the Pawnee, from 1865 hunting again in Lakota country, provoking frantic appeals for troops to protect them and the Pawnee Agency white employees; therefore he led the Sichangu braves to clean out the Pawnee in the Republican River country. Spotted Tail did not join the new uprising along the Bozeman Trail promoted and led by Red Cloud, but other important leaders, as Tashunka Kokipapi (Old Man Feared-for-his-Horses), Palani Wikakte (Pawnee Killer), He Isnala (Lone Horn), He Napin Wanica (No Horn), Pezi (Grass), Tatoka Inyanka (Running Proghorn) were not convinced supporters of a new war on the Wasichu, and would have disengaged as soon as possible. After Red Cloud's war Spotted Tail agreed to the treaty, which in 1868 established the Great Sioux Reservation in West River, west of the Missouri River. In 1871, the senior Spotted Tail, by then the principal war chief and leader of the Sichangu Lakota, visited Washington, D.C. to meet the Commissioner of Indian Affairs Ely S. Parker and President Ulysses S. Grant. While there, he met with Red Cloud, the principal war chief and leader of the Oglala Lakota, and they agreed to work together on preserving Sioux rights and land. Spotted Tail succeeded in maintaining almost balanced relations with the Wasichu, visiting Washington several times and gaining the esteem of many high officers and government civil servants, so much that, in January 1872, Gen. Philip Sheridan and lt. col. George A. Custer presented him with 25 wagons loaded with supplies to be shared among his Sichangu to be host to Grand Duke Alexei Alexandrovich (son of Russian Emperor Alexander II) and, with his warriors, to accompany the imperial prince to a buffalo hunting together with Custer, "Buffalo Bill" Cody and scout Charley Reynolds and an honor military escort including a unit of "Buffalo Soldiers", with full satisfaction of the imperial guest and the US Government. The Sichangu went back to Whetstone agency in the spring, and in June 1872 Spotted Tail, with Two Strike (Nomkahpa), Swift Bear (Mahto Ohanko) and a large Sichangu delegation, went to Washington, and so did Red Cloud too with an Oglala delegation, to discuss the government proposal of assignment to their people of a new reservation, and ask to move the agency from the Missouri to White River; there, Spotted Tail's and Red Cloud's agencies should be settled.

== Prelude to the Great Sioux War of 1876-77 ==
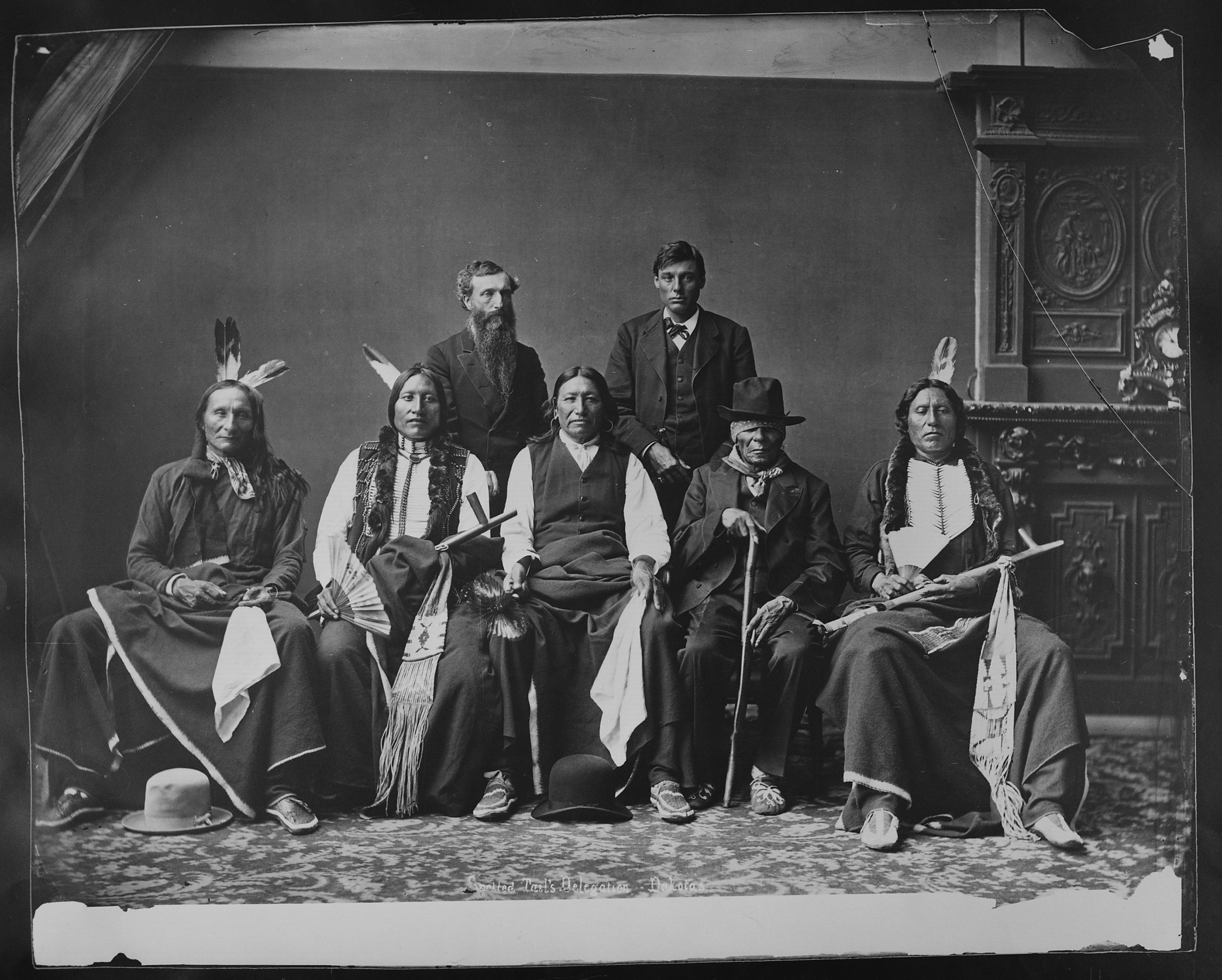
Spotted Tail's delegation to Washington

In 1874, George Armstrong Custer led a reconnaissance mission into Sioux territory that reported gold in the Black Hills, an area held sacred by the local Indians. Formerly, the Army tried to keep miners out but did not succeed; the threat of violence grew. In May 1875, delegations headed by Spotted Tail, Red Cloud, and Lone Horn traveled to Washington, D.C. in a last-ditch attempt to persuade President Grant to honor existing treaties and stem the flow of miners into their territories. The Indians met with Grant, Secretary of the Interior Delano, and Commissioner of Indian Affairs Smith, who informed them that Congress wanted to resolve the matter by giving the tribes $25,000 for their land and resettling them into Indian Territory. The Indians rejected such a treaty, with Spotted Tail's reply to the proposition being as follows:

My father, I have considered all the Great Father told me, and have come here to give you an answer.... When I was here before, the President gave me my country, and I put my stake down in a good place, and there I want to stay.... I respect the Treaty (doubtless referring to the 1868 Treaty of Fort Laramie) but the white men who come in our country do not. You speak of another country, but it is not my country; it does not concern me, and I want nothing to do with it. I was not born there.... If it is such a good country, you ought to send the white men now in our country there and let us alone....

The chiefs organized a general council at Lone Tree (halfway between Red Cloud's and Spotted Tail's agencies) and it confirmed the general hostility against any cession, but, in the summer Custer's 7° Cavalry was sent to the Black Hills and a Government Commission (Sen. William B. Allison, rev. Samuel D. Hinman, gen. A. Terry, John Collins - trader at Laramie -) was sent to negotiate the transfer of the region: Red Cloud did not appear and Spotted Tail rejected the Commission proposal.

While Sitting Bull (Tatanka Yotanka) was organizing a general uprising in the north to defend Lakota sovereignty on the Black Hills, and Red Cloud (Mahpiua Luta) was growing more and more angry, Spotted Tail (Sinte Galeshka) went for a reconnaissance mission for his own, finding gold richness in the hills, and then went again for an other reconnaissance mission with other chiefs and Indian Agent Edwin A. Howard to show them his discovery and have a real esteem of the economic worth of the country, then asked for a price ten times greater and government men refused, as he had foreseen.

When the Black Hills' campaign started, both Rosebud (Spotted Tail's Sichangu) and Pine Ridge (Red Cloud's Oglala) reservations were put under strict military control, weapons and horses were seized by the army and the two great chiefs were cautiously arrested.

After the Little Bighorn battle and Sitting Bull's withdrawal to Canada, many hostile bands decided or were forced to turn back to Spotted Tail's and Red Cloud's, where the majority of Sichangu and Oglala had stayed anyway; the two great chiefs were active in missions to call back the scattered bands, including Tashunka Witko (Crazy Horse)’s and, later, Piji (Gall)’s; Spotted Tail was able to gain the surrender to gen. George Crook of ten times the hostiles who surrendered to col. Nelson Miles; the horses belonging to these bands were given to the reservation chiefs, but Spotted Tail turned back to them their horses (1200 horses were returned to Mahpiua Icahtagya ‘Touching-the-Cloud’’ ’s Minneconjou and Mahto Hanska ‘’Tall Bear’’ ’s and Mahto Sha ‘’Red Bear’’ ‘s Itazipcho), as he used (being the only Lakota chief to receive, as thanks by Crook, a government salary or as head chief of the Lakota or as honorary major of the Army) to distribute the whole amount of his government's money, which he had asked to get in one-dollar banknotes, to the needy Lakota families in the reservation.

== Death ==
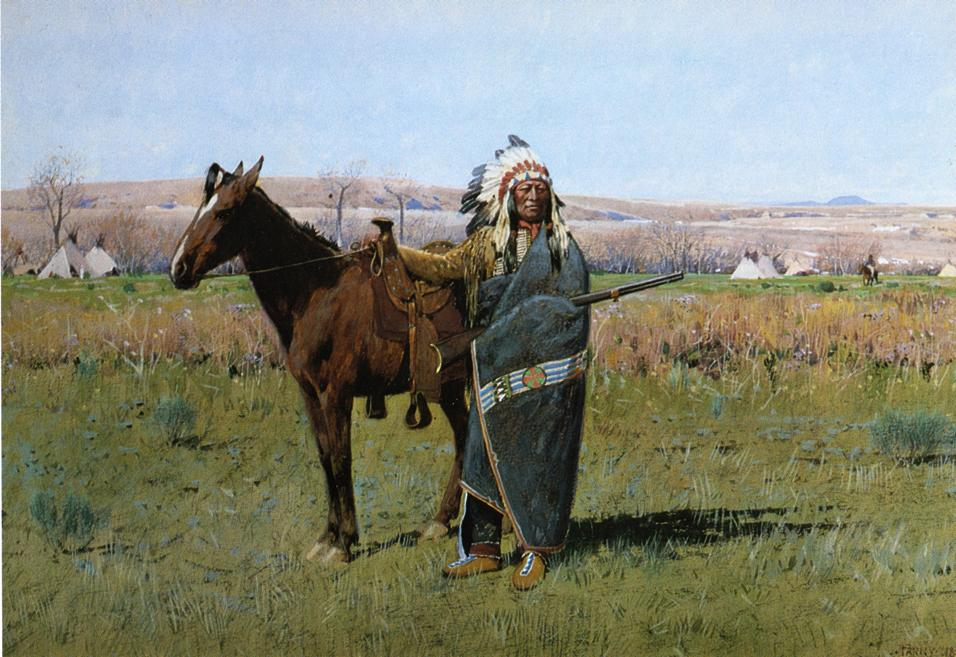
Spotted Tail, by Henry Farny

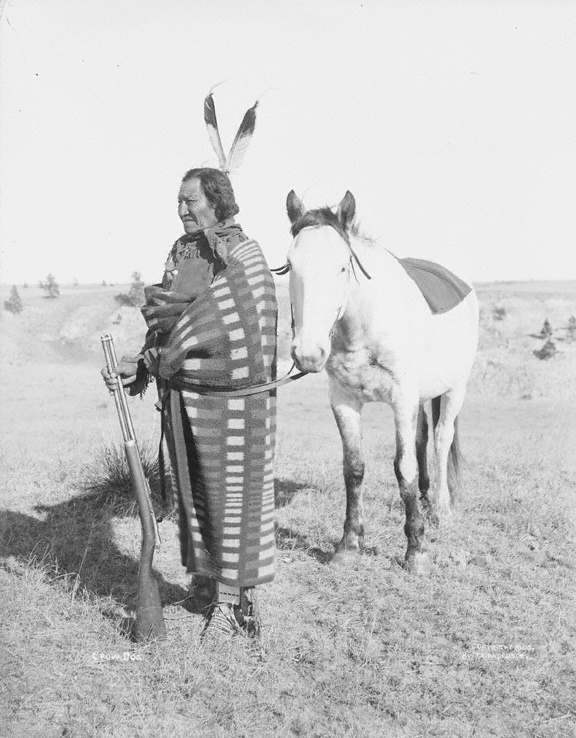
Crow Dog with a Remington–Keene rifle, ca. 1898.

In 1881, while he was still carrying on his struggle to defend the reservations and Lakota's life on their soil, and to counter the power of government Indian agents over the reservation of Lakota people following the Black Hills War, Spotted Tail was killed by Crow Dog for reasons that have been disputed. Luther Standing Bear claimed Spotted Tail was murdered by Crow Dog, accusing him of selling land not belonging to him and for taking the wife of a crippled man. Although these accusations were made without any evidence and they were said to anger several Sioux leaders, Spotted Tail refused to give the woman back, claiming the United States government stood behind him. Several men would have decided to kill Spotted Tail but, before they could act, he was killed by Crow Dog (his old opponent, said to be Scattering Bear's nephew aspiring to replace Spotted Tail in his head chieftaincy, former chief of the Indian police appointed by the corrupted Agent Cicero Newell and dismissed because of the lacking respect for him of the Sichangu) on August 5, 1881. According to historian Dee Brown: "White officials...dismissed the killing as the culmination of a quarrel over a woman, but Spotted Tail's friends said that it was the result of a plot to break the power of the chiefs."

On August 5, 1881, after a long simmering feud, Crow Dog shot and killed Chief Spotted Tail on the Rosebud Indian Reservation. Crow Dog was arrested and tried in a territorial court in Deadwood, Dakota Territory, and found guilty of murder and sentenced to hang. In the case of Ex parte Crow Dog, the United States Supreme Court overturned the verdict because the Deadwood Court had no jurisdiction in a case of one Indian killing another on reservation lands. Crow Dog was released and returned to the Rosebud.

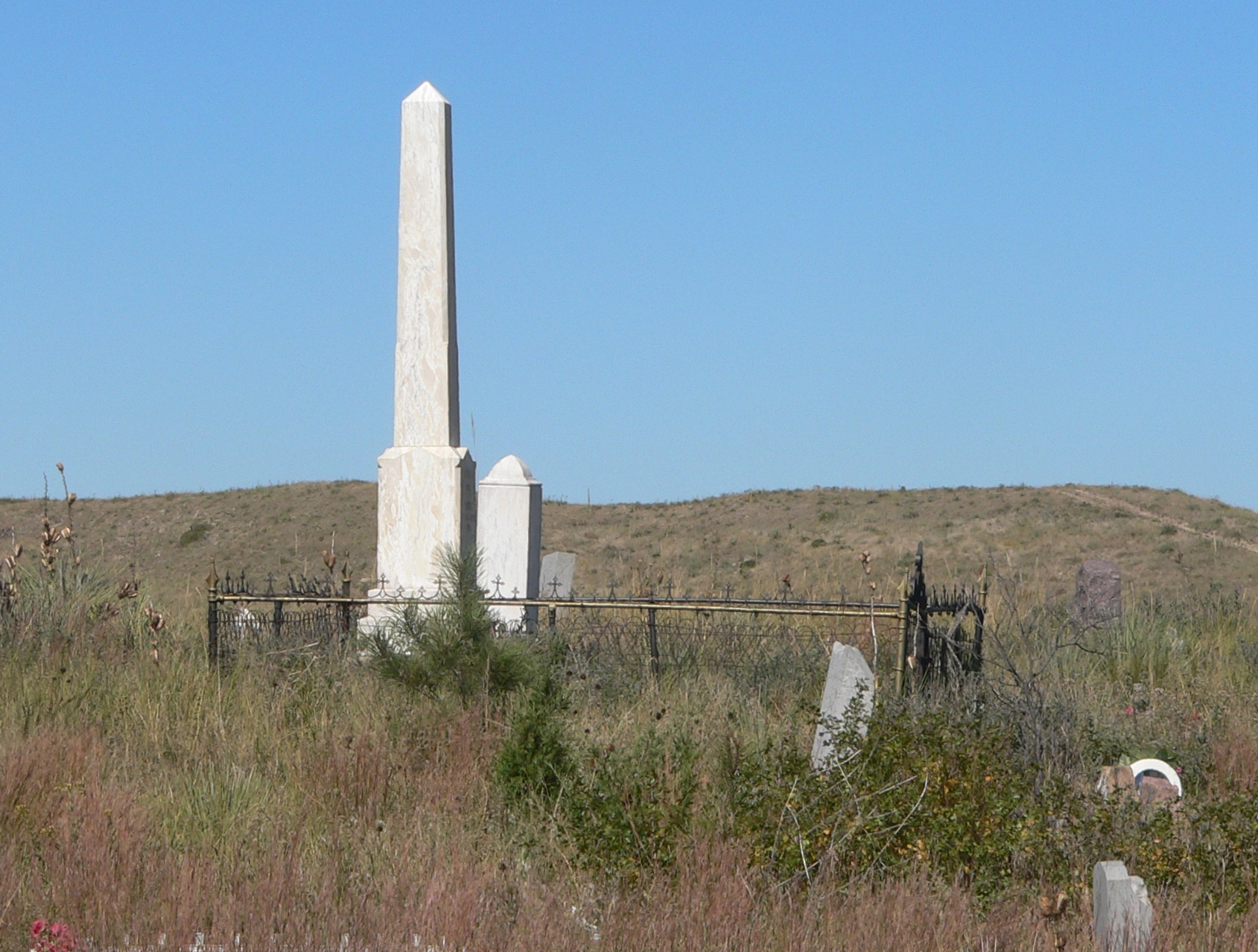
Spotted Tail's grave on the Rosebud Reservation

Spotted Tail is buried at the Spotted Tail Gravesite in Rosebud, South Dakota. A tribal university (Sinte Gleska University) on the Rosebud Indian Reservation in South Dakota was named for him in 1971.

In 2024 Spotted Tail's descendent John Spotted Tail received a suitcase of artifacts Spotted Tail had given to Indian Agent Major Cicero Newell; after five generations the artifacts were returned to the Lakota.

== Impact on Indian legal jurisprudence ==
Spotted Tail's death influenced critical Indian law principles, long after his death. The case of Ex parte Crow Dog established that Indian tribes retain their sovereignty. The case also motivated the immediate creation, starting in 1885 of a series of federal statutes laying out the division of power between federal courts and Indian tribal courts to try Indian and non-Indian persons, in different circumstances for different crimes on Indian reservations. However Ex parte Crow Dog also established the plenary powers doctrine, giving Congress the power to pass any law they choose (including laws altering treaties that had been previously entered into), even over the opposition of the tribe or tribes affected.

== See also ==
- Black Hills
- Ex parte Crow Dog
- Spotted Tail Creek

== Sources ==
- Hyde, George E. (1974) [1961], Spotted Tail's Folk: A History of the Brulé Sioux (2nd ed.), University of Oklahoma Press, ISBN 978-0-8061-1380-7
- Griske, Michael (2005), The Diaries of John Hunton, Heritage Books, pp. 66–69, 91–96, ISBN 0-7884-3804-2
