= Spotted Tail Gravesite =

- U.S. National Register of Historic Places
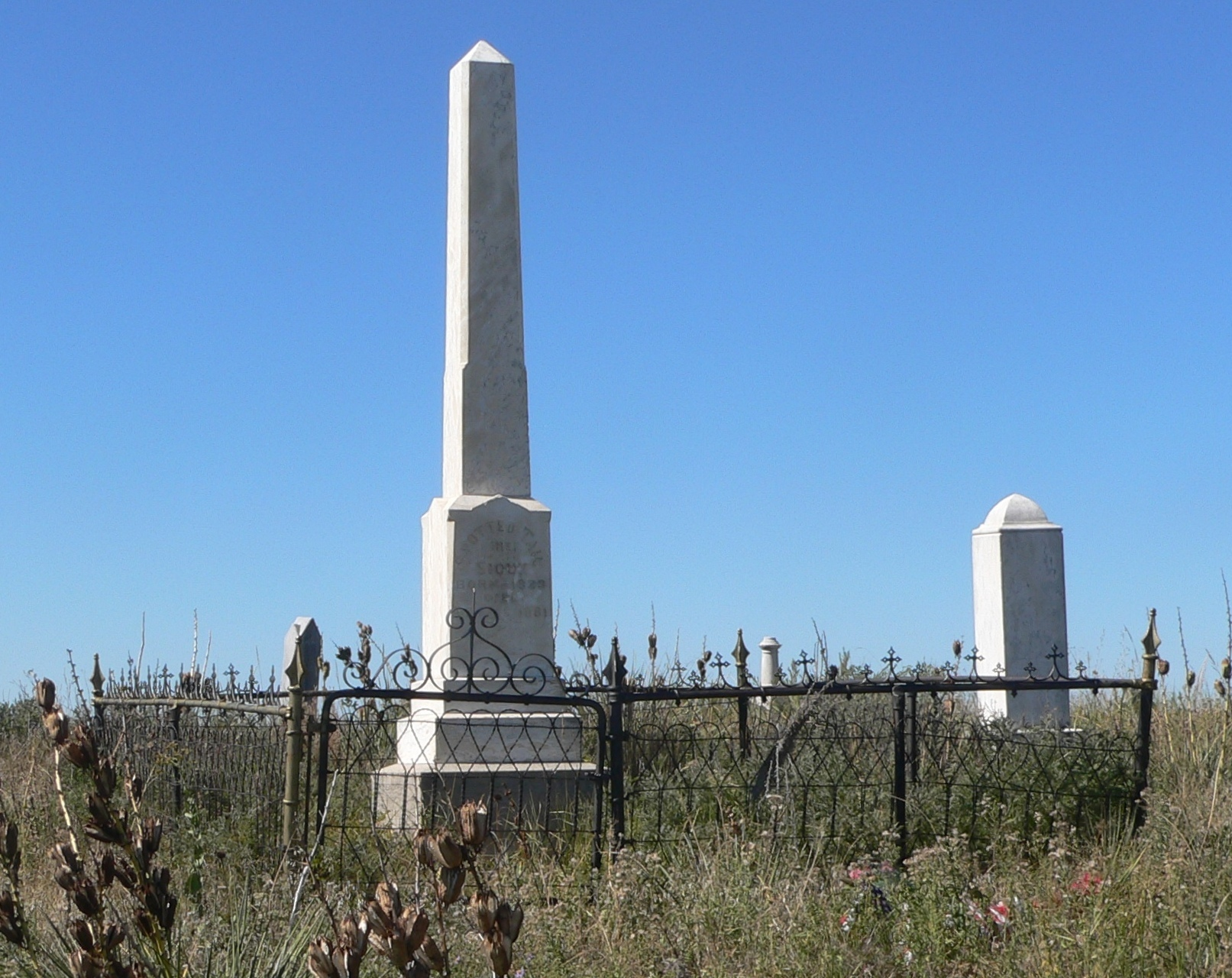

- Location within South Dakota Location within the United States
- Nearest city: Rosebud, South Dakota
- Coordinates: 43°14′29″N 100°51′10″W
- Area: less than one acre
- Built: 1881
- NRHP reference No.: 80003735
- Added to NRHP: May 7, 1980

The gravesite of the Brulé Lakota chief Spotted Tail stands outside an Episcopal cemetery on the outskirts of Rosebud, South Dakota, the government center of the Rosebud Indian Reservation. It is marked by a stone obelisk which is engraved "Spotted Tail", Chief of the Sioux (Born 1823, Died Aug. 5, 1881). The plot is surrounded by a wrought iron fence. It is significant as the only site associated with Spotted Tail's life. Spotted Tail was chosen to lead the Brulé when they were first confined to the reservation, and was an influential figure in the tribal politics of the 1870s. His gravesite was listed on the National Register of Historic Places in 1980.

== See also ==
- National Register of Historic Places listings in Todd County, South Dakota
