= National Register of Historic Places listings in Todd County, South Dakota =

Location of Todd County in South Dakota

This is a list of the National Register of Historic Places listings in Todd County, South Dakota.

This is intended to be a complete list of the properties and districts on the National Register of Historic Places in Todd County, South Dakota, United States. The locations of National Register properties and districts for which the latitude and longitude coordinates are included below, may be seen in a map.

There are 5 properties and districts listed on the National Register in the county.

This National Park Service list is complete through NPS recent listings posted May 1, 2026.

== Current listings ==
	Name on the Register	Image	Date listed	Location	City or town	Description
1	He Dog Consolidated School	He Dog Consolidated School	September 3, 2020 (#100005331)	25300 BIA 4; 43°17′55″N 101°03′38″W	Parmelee	
2	Rosebud Hotel		May 7, 1980 (#80003734)	7 Circle Dr. 43°13′56″N 100°51′11″W	Rosebud	No longer extant as of May 2026, possibly much earlier.
3	St. Francis Mission	St. Francis Mission	June 20, 1975 (#75001723)	Rosebud Indian Reservation; 43°08′28″N 100°54′14″W	St. Francis	
4	Spotted Tail Gravesite	Spotted Tail Gravesite	May 7, 1980 (#80003735)	North of Rosebud; 43°14′29″N 100°51′10″W	Rosebud	

== Former listing ==
	Name on the Register	Image	Date listed	Date removed	Location	City or town	Description
1	Rosebud Agency		May 7, 1980 (#80003733)	September 10, 2002	Main St. and Legion Ave. 43°13′53″N 100°51′15″W	Rosebud	

== See also ==
- List of National Historic Landmarks in South Dakota
- National Register of Historic Places listings in South Dakota
