= St. Francis Mission =

Coordinates: 43°8′18.74″N 100°54′16″W

- Lakota Chief Spotted Tail requested Jesuit educators
- Established: 1886; 140 years ago
- Location(s): Rosebud Indian Reservation 350 Oak St. St. Francis, South Dakota
- Board of Directors: President; Fr. John Hatcher, S.J.
- Area: 34 acres (14 ha)
- Affiliations: Jesuit, Catholic
- Website: SF Mission

- St. Francis Mission
- U.S. National Register of Historic Places
- U.S. Historic district
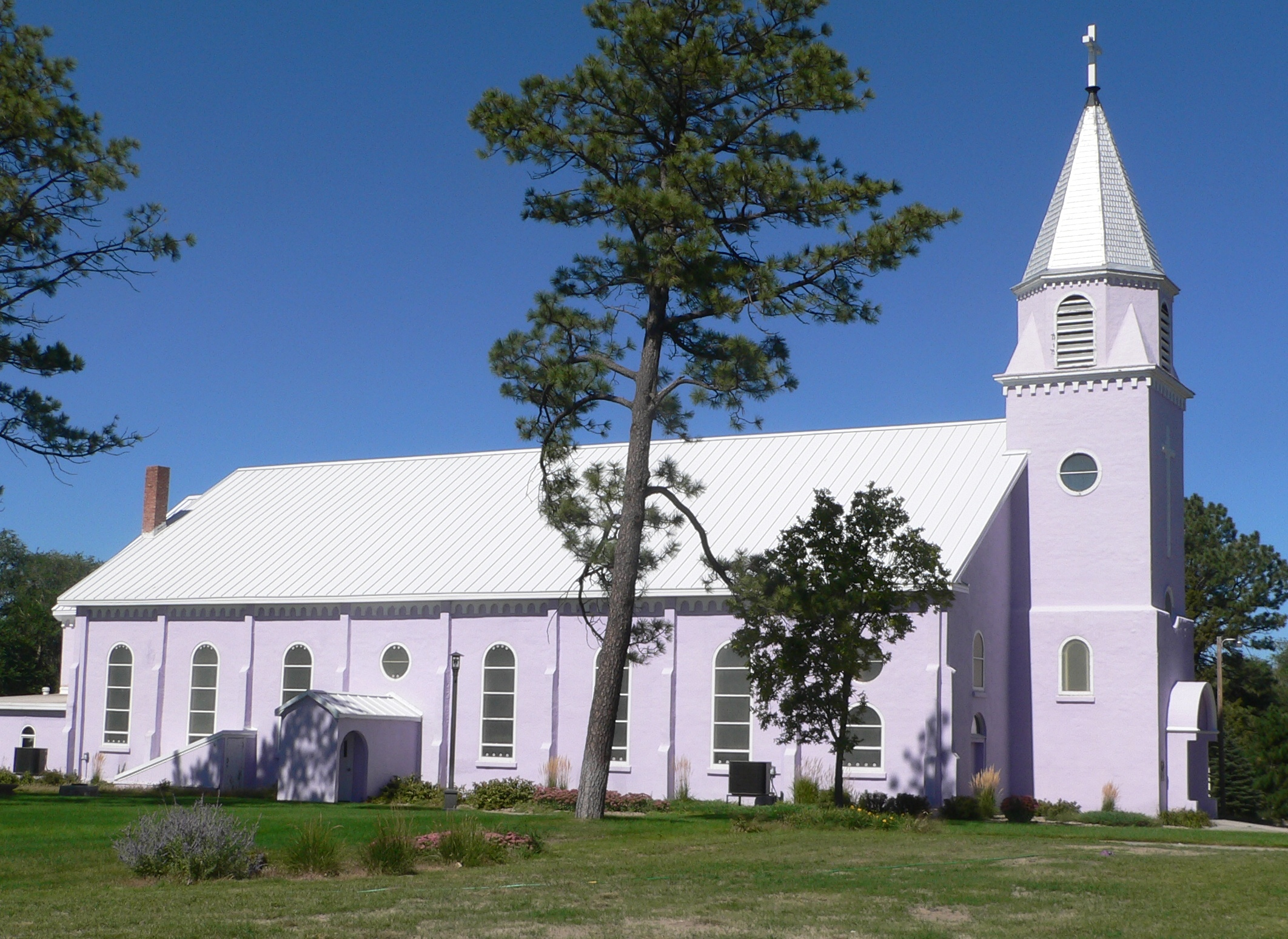
- St. Charles Borromeo Catholic Church
- Location: Rosebud Indian Reservation
- NRHP reference No.: 75001723
- Added to NRHP: June 20, 1975

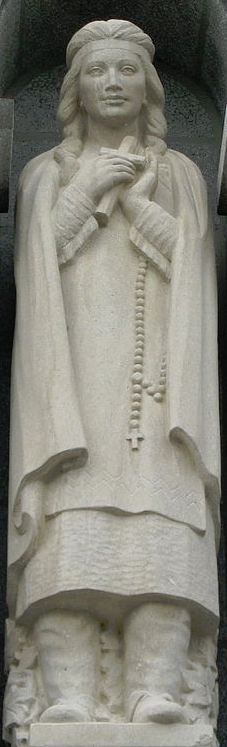
Kateri Tekakwitha

St. Francis Mission is a Roman Catholic mission complex on the Rosebud Indian Reservation in St. Francis, South Dakota, in territory of the Lakota (Sioux) Native Americans. The mission was founded in 1886 by priests of the Society of Jesus (Jesuits), who were welcomed by Bishop Martin Marty of the Diocese of Saint Cloud, Minnesota, which extended to this territory at the time. The Jesuit order soon developed a large complex to serve the Lakota at this reservation. Most of the buildings were destroyed by a fire in 1916, but many were soon rebuilt.

Today the mission complex includes 26 buildings, the most prominent of which are St. Charles Borromeo Church and the 1916 Drexel Hall. The latter is a multi-function structure providing classrooms, meeting spaces, and residential spaces. The complex also includes one of two known copies of a statue of Native American saint, Kateri Tekakwitha, by Joseph-Émile Brunet. The complex was listed on the National Register of Historic Places in 1975.

== History ==
Jesuit Fr. Peter DeSmet, S.J., was welcomed here in the 1840s by the Plains Indians on a mission from Saint Louis, Missouri. During this period, he had contacts with the Lakota. Based on DeSmet's reputation as a man who could be trusted, and on the Jesuit reputation as educators, in 1877, Chief Sinte Gleska (Spotted Tail), leader of the Sicangu Lakota, and Chief Red Cloud, leader of the Oglala, obtained permission from President Rutherford B. Hayes "to get Catholic priests. Those who wear black dresses. These men will teach us how to read and write English."

A Jesuit Father and brother reached the reservation soon after 1881 and, with financial help from St. Katherine Drexel, constructed a large building by 1886. In 1888, Franciscan Sisters Kostka, Rosalia, and Alcantara came to teach in the school, which they named after St. Francis. Jesuit Fr. Florentine Digmann, who had come with the sisters, worked with the Lakota and established a total of 37 mission stations, or chapels, on the Rosebud Reservation.

Since 1974, the tribe has run the school, locally called Sapa Un Ti ("where the Black Robes live"), independently from the Jesuit mission. The many chapels have been replaced by six parishes on the reservation.

== Current programs ==
In 2016, three Jesuit priests, along with Jesuit Volunteer Corps members, were serving the Mission. They were assisted by Lakota: a deacon, several commissioned lay ministers, and numerous volunteers, all of whom worked among the 20,000 Lakota who reside on the reservation. The Mission supports high school equivalency (GED) and adult education, the Icimani Ya Waste Recovery Center, the White River Recovery Center, the CYO Religious Education Center in Rosebud, and the Wiwila Wakpala after-school center in Spring Creek

The following programs are conducted at the Mission Center:

- Sapa Un Catholic Academy, based on the Jesuit Nativity model of schools, began in 2013 teaching both English and Lakota to 10-12 students a year in grades K through 5. The school's goal is to enable more Lakota to graduate from colleges and universities and become leaders among their people. Open to students of all religions, its tuition is low and it offers scholarships. Cultural enhancement opportunities include a month-long summer camp.
- Lakota Studies is an effort to preserve the Lakota language and cultural heritage, with a view especially to its spiritual richness. Deacon Ben Black Bear, Jr. is translating the New Testament into Lakota, along with prayers and catechism instructions. In 2008, the program produced a new, more complete Lakota dictionary.
- Family Recovery program, funded by the Betty Ford Institute, addresses the family dynamics behind addiction problems, in a 12-hour program to facilitate recovery in the context of the whole family situation. The program is conducted by a trained staff in a different community on the reservation each month. Many participants have engaged with further Mission recovery programs such as Al-Anon and Alcoholics Anonymous.
- Suicide prevention: In a single year, beginning in October 2007, more than 1% of the 20,000 residents on the reservation attempted suicide; 27 succeeded. This compared to a national rate of 11.26 suicides for a comparable population. In hearings before the United States Senate Committee on Indian Affairs, the tribe called for more resources and leadership activities to address the problem, The Mission provides a crisis hotline 24/7.
- KINI 96.1 FM radio is a work of the Mission; its broadcast area encompasses south central South Dakota and north central Nebraska. It offers a complete spectrum of news on the reservation and national scenes, along with weather, music, local sports, and religious education. It reaches over 20,000 listeners.
- A dental clinic has been running with volunteer dentists since 2012.
- Buechel Memorial Lakota Museum is named for the noted linguist and ethnologist Fr. Eugene Buechel, S.J., who came to the Mission in 1902 and died there in 1954. It houses a collection of over 2000 items related to ethnography and over 42,000 photos. The Mission is also represented in a Special Collection in the Marquette University archives.

== See also ==
- National Register of Historic Places listings in Todd County, South Dakota
