= Spotted Tail Creek =

Stream in Keya Paha County, Nebraska, U.S.

Coordinates: 42.9302785°N 99.3245483°W

Spotted Tail Creek is a stream in Sioux County, Nebraska, in the United States. It is a tributary of Keya Paha River.

Spotted Tail Creek was named for Spotted Tail, a Brulé Lakota tribal chief.

== See also ==
- List of rivers of Nebraska
