= Eugene Buechel =

Eugene Buechel was born on October 20, 1874, in Schleida, now Schleid, in the Grand Duchy of Saxe-Weimar-Eisenach, Germany, and died October 27, 1954, in O'Neill, Nebraska, United States. Buechel was a Jesuit priest and missionary, linguist and anthropologist among the Brulé or Sicangu Lakota or Sioux on the Rosebud Indian Reservation and the related Oglala Lakota or Sioux on the Pine Ridge Indian Reservation in South Dakota.

== Life ==
He was the tenth and last child of his parents. His father was a farmer whose father and grandfather had been village mayors; several of his relatives had emigrated to America. When Eugen was born, four of his parents’ earlier children had died. In 1881 Eugen's father and in 1882 his mother died. After grade-school (1881–86), he attended the boarding-school for boys of the Roman Catholic Diocese of Fulda (1886–96) followed by three semesters in the Fulda diocesan seminary (1896–97).

On October 12, 1897, he entered the noviciate of the German Province of the Society of Jesus (Jesuits), which then was located in Bleijenbeek (Netherlands) due to the expulsion of the Jesuits during the Kulturkampf of the German Reich. After completing this two-years-probation period and further humanistic studies at Exaeten (Netherlands) he was sent to the United States to continue his studies in July, 1900.

From August 1900 to May 1902 Eugen Büchel studied philosophy at the Jesuits' Sacred Heart College in Prairie du Chien, Wisconsin. In May 1902 his superiors sent him to St. Francis Indian Mission in the Rosebud Indian Reservation of the Sicangu or Brulé Lakota in South Dakota. This mission and the Holy Rosary Mission among the Oglala Lakota in the neighboring Pine Ridge Reservation had been founded in 1886 and 1888, resp., by Jesuits of the German Province with collaboration from the German Sisters of St. Francis of Penance and Christian Charity. From 1902 to 1904 Büchel worked as an educator at the boarding-school and a teacher of religion and music while also studying the Lakota language. In September 1904 he began to study theology at Saint Louis University in St. Louis, Missouri, and on June 28, 1906, he was ordained a priest. After another year of formation (tertianship) in Brooklyn, Ohio, Father Büchel returned to the Lakota in August 1907, first as a teacher at Holy Rosary Mission School in Pine Ridge, and then in 1908 as its superior for eight years.

On December 10, 1909, Father Superior Büchel buried Oglala-Chief Red Cloud in the cemetery of Holy Rosary. Over thirty years earlier, Red Cloud had demanded "Black Robes" and "Holy Women," i.e. Catholic priests and nuns, for the Oglala from the U.S. authorities. On September 25, 1914, Büchel became an American citizen and changed the spelling of his name to Eugene Buechel.

In October 1916 Buechel moved to St. Francis to become superior there for six years. From 1926 to 1929 he returned to Holy Rosary as a missionary, and in 1929, Buechel transferred back to St. Francis again, where he stayed until his death. After suffering a stroke he died at St. Anthony’s Hospital, O'Neill, Nebraska, on October 27, 1954. He lies buried at St. Francis.

== Work ==
During most of his career, Buechel served as an itinerant missionary who lived among the Lakota and frequently stayed in the homes of Lakota parishioners. At various times he also served as the superintendent of the St. Francis Mission school, Rosebud Reservation, and the Holy Rosary Mission school (now Red Cloud High School and Red Cloud Grade School), Pine Ridge Reservation. On both reservations Wanbli Sapa (Black Eagle), as he was called, collaborated closely with native catechists, among them Nicholas Black Elk (of Black Elk Speaks).

Buechel was dedicated to converting the Lakota to Christianity and transforming their lives. But also he was dedicated to preserving their Lakota language and cultural heritage. Already during his first stay at St. Francis (1902–1904) Buechel wrote down stories of the Lakota. In collaboration with Ivan Stars and other Lakota catechists, Buechel collected oral histories, now published bilingually, and cultural objects with related information, now preserved at the Buechel Memorial Lakota Museum, St. Francis, South Dakota, and first displayed at the Mission in 1921. With the Sicangu Lakota, he also collected names of plants and their use and he took photographs of the people on the reservations to document their lives. Between 1902 and 1954, he compiled over 24,000 Lakota (and Dakota) word entries on slips of paper for a bilingual dictionary of the Lakota language, which included approximately 18,000 from the work of Stephen Return Riggs, several thousand from his conversations with native people, and a few from the works of Emil Perrig, S.J., and Lakota anthropologist Ella Cara Deloria.

In 1924, Buechel published his first notable work in Lakota, his Bible History, which included a selection of texts modeled after the German Biblische Geschichte. In 1927 the Jesuit missionaries, with Buechel playing a major role, published Sursum Corda, a Lakota-language book of prayers and hymns, and in 1939, Buechel published his main work, A Grammar of Lakota. Meanwhile, he gained recognition as a linguist through his correspondence with anthropologists like Franz Boas and Lakota Ella Cara Deloria. Buechel was not able to finish his dictionary himself; it appeared in print long after his death, as did other books building upon his collections.

In 1947, on the occasion of Buechel's 50th anniversary as a member of the Jesuit order, Joseph Schwart (born Josef Schwärzler in Austria) a Jesuit religious brother, constructed a separate museum building for the ethnological collection. When Buechel died, it contained 661 objects, each with a name and description (most often in Lakota) written by him, and a catalogue number. During the following decades it grew to about 2,200 at present.

Buechel's linguistic work today is recognized and used as one of the most important sources for the Lakota language by all who want to learn it or have a general concern in its preservation and development. Many Lakota remember him as a man who respected their personal dignity and their traditional culture. Among the Jesuits today, he is increasingly perceived as a role model because of his respectful attitude towards the Lakota as a people and as individuals.

== Writings ==
- Wowapi wakan wicowoyake yuptecelapi kin. Bible history in the language of the Teton Sioux Indians. Benziger, New York, 1924.
- Sursum Corda. Lakota Wocekiye na Olowan Wowapi. Sioux Indian Prayer and Hymn Book. Central Bureau of the Catholic Central Verein of America, St. Louis, Missouri, 1927.
- A Grammar of Lakota: The Language of the Teton Sioux Indians. John S. Swift, St. Louis, Missouri, 1939.
- Lakota-English Dictionary. edited by Paul Manhart, S.J., 1st ed.: Pine Ridge, South Dakota: Holy Rosary Mission, 1970; 2nd ed.: University of Nebraska Press, Lincoln and London, Nebraska, 2002.
- Rosebud and Pine Ridge Photographs, 1922-1942. Grossmont College Development Foundation, El Cajon, California, 1974.
- John A. Anderson, Eugene Buechel, S.J., Don Doll, S.J.: Crying for a Vision. A Rosebud Sioux Trilogy 1886-1976. Morgan & Morgan, Dobbs Ferry, New York, 1976.
- Lakota Tales and Texts. Red Cloud Indian School, Pine Ridge, South Dakota, 1978.
- D. J. Rogers: Lakota Names and Traditional Uses of Native Plants by Sicangu (Brulé) People in the Rosebud Area, South Dakota: A Study Based on Father Eugene Buechel's Collection of Plants of Rosebud around 1920. Rosebud Educational Society, St. Francis, South Dakota, 1980.
- Lakota Tales and Texts In Translation. 2 vols., translated by Paul Manhart, S.J., Tipi Press, Chamberlain, South Dakota, 1998.

== Literature on Eugene Buechel ==
- Karl Markus Kreis, ed.: Ein deutscher Missionar bei den Sioux-Indianern. Der Sprachforscher, Ethnologe und Sammler Eugen Büchel / Eugene Buechel (1874–1954). Materialien zu Leben und Werk. Fachhochschule Dortmund, Dortmund (Germany), 2004.
- Raymond A. Bucko: Father Eugene Buechel, S.J. And the Lakota - Images and Imagination. In: American Catholic Studies 116:3 (2005) pp. 83–88.
- Raymond A. Bucko: Buechel, Eugene (1874–1954), in: H. James Birx (ed.): Encyclopedia of Anthropology, vol. 1. Sage Publ., Thousand Oaks, CA, 2005, pp. 428–29.
- Raymond A. Bucko and Kay Koppedrayer: Father Buchel's Collection of Lakota Materials. In: Material Culture, 39:2 (2007) pp. 17–42.
- Karl Markus Kreis: Von der Rhön in die Prärie. Der Missionar Eugen Büchel SJ aus Geisa-Schleid, in: Jahrbuch für mitteldeutsche Kirchen- und Ordensgeschichte, Cordier, Heiligenstadt, 4 (2008), pp. 151–178.

== See also ==
- Lakota language
- Lakota mythology
- Marquette University Special Collections and University Archives
