= Rosebud, South Dakota =

Rosebud, South Dakota Sicanġu
- Census Designated Place
- Location in Todd County and the state of South Dakota
- Coordinates: 43°14′44″N 100°49′46″W
- Country: United States
- State: South Dakota
- Counties: Todd

Area
  - Total: 13 sq mi (34 km^{2})
  - Land: 13.1 sq mi (33.9 km^{2})
  - Water: 0.039 sq mi (0.1 km^{2})
- Elevation: 2,838 ft (865 m)

Population (2020)
  - Total: 1,455
  - Density: 121/sq mi (46.8/km^{2})
- Time zone: UTC-6 (Central (CST))
  - Summer (DST): UTC-5 (CDT)
- GNIS feature ID: 2393213

Rosebud also Sicanġu (Lakhota Sicanġu; "Scorched Thigh") is a census-designated place (CDP) in Todd County, South Dakota, United States. The population was 1,455 at the 2020 census.

Rosebud is located on the Rosebud Indian Reservation. It is home to the Rosebud Sioux tribe. Rosebud also has many tribal agencies such as the Indian Health Service, Bureau of Indian Affairs, Tribal Land Enterprise, Tribal BIA Police, and the Division of Forestry and Wildland Fire Management.

== Geography ==
According to the United States Census Bureau, the CDP has a total area of 13.1 square miles (34 km^{2}), of which 13.1 square miles (34 km^{2}) is land and 0.04 square miles (0.10 km^{2}) (0.30%) is water.

Rosebud has been assigned the ZIP code 57570.

== Demographics ==
Historical population
Census	Pop.	Note	%±
1990	1,538		—
2000	1,557		1.2%
2010	1,587		1.9%
2020	1,455		−8.3%
U.S. Decennial Census

As of the census of 2000, there were 1,557 people, 405 households, and 315 families living in the CDP. The population density was 119.1 inhabitants per square mile (46.0/km^{2}). There were 465 housing units at an average density of 35.6 per square mile (13.7/km^{2}). The racial makeup of the CDP was 4.17% White, 0.06% African American, 93.38% Native American, 0.39% Asian, 0.71% from other races, and 1.28% from two or more races. Hispanic or Latino of any race were 2.25% of the population.

There were 405 households, out of which 52.6% had children under the age of 18 living with them, 30.6% were married couples living together, 36.3% had a female householder with no husband present, and 22.0% were non-families. 18.0% of all households were made up of individuals, and 3.2% had someone living alone who was 65 years of age or older. The average household size was 3.79 and the average family size was 4.21.

In the CDP, the population was spread out, with 45.9% under the age of 18, 10.8% from 18 to 24, 27.4% from 25 to 44, 13.0% from 45 to 64, and 3.0% who were 65 years of age or older. The median age was 20 years. For every 100 females, there were 95.4 males. For every 100 females age 18 and over, there were 92.9 males.

The median income for a household in the CDP was $19,906, and the median income for a family was $19,866. Males had a median income of $17,188 versus $23,886 for females. The per capita income for the CDP was $8,462. About 40.8% of families and 43.6% of the population were below the poverty line, including 46.8% of those under age 18 and 11.9% of those age 65 or over.

== Name ==
The words "Rosebud" and "Sioux" are actually not part of the Lakota vocabulary. Rosebud is the site name for the Federal Agency designated for the Sicangu People in 1877, so named because of the abundance of wild rosebuds that grew in the area.

== Transportation ==
Rosebud is served by Rosebud Sioux Tribal Airport.

== See also ==
- Rosebud Indian Reservation
