= Frank Waln =

Sicangu Lakota rapper

- Born: August 2, 1989 (age 37); Rosebud Sioux Reservation, South Dakota, U.S.
- Citizenship: Sicangu Lakota
- Occupations: musician; songwriter; producer; educator; curator; public speaker; engineer
- Years active: 2010–present
- Musical career
- Genre: Hip hop
- Instruments: Vocals, keyboards
- Website: frankwaln.com

Frank Waln or Oyate Teca Obmani ("Walks With Young People") is a Sicangu Lakota rapper and activist. His first solo album, Born Ready, was released in 2017, followed by The Bridge the same year. He has been awarded three Native American Music Awards and received five nominations, both individually and with his group Nake Nula Waun.

Many of Waln's songs tackle Native American social issues. Waln grew up on the Rosebud Indian Reservation in South Dakota and first began listening to hip hop as a teenager. He later graduated from Columbia College Chicago with a B.A. in Audio Arts and Acoustics, and also received a Gates Millennium Scholarship.

== Early life ==
Waln grew up on the Rosebud Indian Reservation in South Dakota. As a teenager he began listening to the Hip Hop and Rap extensively, connecting his experiences as a Native American dealing with the consequences of colonialism and genocide to the oppression suffered by African Americans. In the early 2000s he began recording with friends and family, eventually saving enough money to build a recording studio in his basement.

A Millennium Scholar, Waln studied pre-med at Creighton University for two years, with the goal of becoming a doctor. After burning out, he realized that music, rather than medicine, was how he would choose to make a difference and a living. He then moved to Chicago, studying audio design at Columbia College Chicago, and graduated in 2014.

== Music ==
In 2010 Waln formed the group Nake Nula Waun (transl.: "I am always ready, at all times, for anything"), with Thomas Schmidt, Andre Easter, and Kodi DeNoyer. They released the album Scars and Bars that year, with Waln receiving the Best Producer award at the 2010 Native American Music Awards. The band receiving the Best Hip-Hop Recording award in 2011 for the same album. Their follow-up, The Definition, was released in 2013 and was again nominated for Best Hip-Hop Recording.

Alongside his work with Nake Nula Waun, Waln also has a solo career. His single Hear My Cry was nominated for two Nammy awards in 2013 after its release, winning one; Oil 4 Blood, a 2013 song about the Keystone XL pipeline, was singled out by Policymic.com, who identified him as one of '7 First Nation Rappers Crushing Stereotypes of Indigenous People Through Music'. In 2015, Waln sampled "What Made the Red Man Red?" from Disney's 1953 film Peter Pan, noted for its broadly stereotypical portrayal of Native Americans, for an identically-titled single about the legacy of white American colonialism and genocide as well as inauthentic depictions of Native Americans in media. Along with Nataani Means, Mike "Witko" Cliff, and Inez Jasper, Waln was featured in the MTV documentary Rebel Music.

Waln released his first solo album, The Bridge, in 2017. and went on to release Born Ready in 2020

== Activism ==
Noted for his work in opposition to the Keystone XL pipeline, Waln contributes to the Dream Warriors scholarships, a project founded by Tanaya Winder (who manages Waln, Tall Paul and Mic Jordan) to provide scholarships to Native Americans looking to study and perform music.

== Discography ==
=== Albums ===
- Scars and Bars (2011, as part of Nake Nula Waun)
- The Definition (2013, as part of Nake Nula Waun)
- Last Stand Mixtape, Vol. 1 (2013, a group album)
- The Bridge (2017)
- Olówan Wétu (Spring Songs) (2020)
- Born Ready (2020)
- In the Key of Lakota (2021)

=== Singles ===
- "Doubt" (2011, as part of Nake Nula Waun)
- "Culture Shock" (2012, as part of Nake Nula Waun)
- "Swagged out Brave Heart of a Lion" (2011)
- "My Stone" (2012)
- "Oil 4 Blood" (2013)
- "AbOriginal" (2013)
- "Born on the Rez" (2014)
- "2 Live & Die On the Plains" (2015)
- "What Made the Red Man Red?" (2015)
- "Good Way" featuring Gunner Jules and Rollie Raps (2016)
- "7" featuring Tanaya Winder (2016)
