= Tanaya Winder =

Indigenous performance poet, writer, motivational speaker, and educator

Tanaya Winder is a performance poet, writer, motivational speaker, and educator. She was raised on the Southern Ute reservation in Ignacio, Colorado and is an enrolled member of the Duckwater Shoshone Tribe. Her background includes Southern Ute, Pyramid Lake Paiute, Dine, and Black heritages. With fellow Indigenous writer Casandra Lopez, she founded As/Us, an online literary magazine to "showcase the creative literary expressions and scholarly work of both emerging and established women writers from around the world." With Lakota rap artist Frank Waln and other collaborators, she runs Dream Warriors Management, an organization to promote Indigenous artists and support young Native students. In 2015, Winder published her first book of poetry, Words Like Love.

Winder grew up on the Southern Ute Indian Reservation in Ignacio, Colorado, and is of Southern Ute, Duckwater Shoshone, and Pyramid Lake Paiute heritage. As a teacher, Winder has worked at Stanford and the University of Colorado Boulder's Upward Bound program. In 2010, she won the Orlando Poetry Prize for her poem "The Impermanence of Human Sculptures." In 2013 she appeared on TEDxABQ with a talk called "Igniting Healing." In 2015, Winder co-curated "Sing Our River Red," a traveling exhibit of single earrings to raise awareness of Canada's epidemic of missing and murdered indigenous women. The following year, she was named one of the "Native American 40 (Leaders) under 40" by the National Center for American Indian Enterprise Development.

== Education ==
Tanaya's interest in poetry began in her senior year of high school with the passing of her grandfather. Tanaya attended Stanford University and although she set out to become a lawyer, Tanaya switched to English in her sophomore year, graduating in 2008 with a BA in English with an emphasis on Creative Writing. Tanaya attended graduate school at the University of New Mexico and received an MFA in Creative Writing/Poetry. Her dissertation was titled, "A collection of poems utilizing motifs of music, birds, and winter to explore themes of loss along with historical and contemporary trauma within Indigenous communities".

== Published books ==
- Soul Talk, Soul Language: Conversations with Joy Harjo. Middletown: Wesleyan UP, 2011. ISBN 978-0819571502
- Words Like Love. Albuquerque: West End Press, 2015. ISBN 978-0-9910742-7-3
- Why Storms Are Named After People and Bullets Remain Nameless. CreateSpace Independent Publishing Platform, 2017. ISBN 9781977979261

== Articles ==
- 2013 The American Indian Graduate, print, “Solar Systems of Support.”12(1), 28-30
- 2011 Substance, Style Soul, online, “One Foot in Front of the Other.”

== Anthologies ==
- 2012 And Love Anthology "Some Kind of Dying" (Jacar Press 2012)

== Theatrical productions ==
2013 “The Order of Things" performed at Emotive Fruition in NYC at the Bowery Poetry.

2013 “Castaway, Castaway,” performed in Love, Redefined by the Poetic Theater Productions Company in NYC.

2013 “Love in a Time of Blood Quantum” (in its entirety, total of 10 poems) performed by the Poetic Theater Productions Company in NYC.

2012 “Somewhere Being Written,” “Love in a Time of Blood Quantum,” “W(hole):Self-Medication,” and “Ten Little Indians.” performed by Poetic Theater Productions Company in NYC.

== Musical settings ==
2012 "Somewhere the Song," published by June Sky Press, performed by Princeton Singers and the University of Missouri River Campus choir.

== Poetry ==
- "Love Lessons in a Time of Settler Colonialism" published in POETRY
- "Missing More Than A Word" published in POETRY
- "Extraction" published in The RUMPUS
- "like any good indian woman" published in World Literature Today
- "Why Storms are Named After People and Bullets Remain Nameless" published in Strange Horizons
- "Notes from the Road" published in Strange Horizons
- "A Song for Redemption" published in Connotation Press
- "The Order of Things" and "Everything You Need to Know About Relationships," published in Ishaan Literary Review
- "Patrick Would Never Say the Word Love" published in Toe Good Poetry
- "Teaching the Riff in Being Tuned to the Rez Blues" published in Bellevue Literary Review
- "What John Wayne Couldn't Have Known" published in Kweli Magazine
- "Sometimes I Dream a Reservation Resides Inside Me," "Love in a Time of Blood Quantum," and "Post-Flight Assessment: The Call of Urgency" published in The Mas Tequila Review (Issue5)
- "Entering the Age of Doubt," Broken Hymn:to the offset metronome," and "I'm Thinking of the Kind of Poems" published in Drunkenboat
- "consider the assemblage of a longing" and "measure by measure" published in Superstition Review Issue 7
- "The Impermanence of Human Sculptures" Winner of the A Room of Her Own Foundation's Orlando Prize in Poetry (2010)
- "Hole in My Heart" published in the Duke CityFix
- "Ten Little Indians" published in the Duke CityFix
- "To the Offset Metronome: On Breaking Rhythm" published in the Duke CityFix
- "Softly: How to Evaporate" published in Lingerpost (Issue 1)
- "Rhapsody in Reservation Blues," "Broken Tulips," "Preface to Lost Intimacies," and "The Significance of a Hanging" (nominated for a Pushcart Prize), published in Adobe Walls
- "Some Kind of Dying" published in And Love (poetry anthology)
- "Textures of Silence," "Reflections of the Moon," and "Separate Strands," published in Yellow Medicine Review (Spring 2010 issue), "The War on Words," and "Surrender to Memory" published in (Fall 2012 issue).
- "The Weight of Water" and "In the Days of Banned Books" published in Malpais Review (Spring 2012 issue)

== Discography ==
Winder made contact with a Sicangu Lakota rapper, Frank Waln, where she found a new way to connect with her poetry. In 2018, she released the EP For Women and Girls on Fire which includes seven tracks including "History of the Breaking Hearts." The EP also features Indigenous artists such as Waln, Jon Chavarillo, Delbert Anderson, and Mic Jordan, many of whom are members of Dream Warriors.

In August 2019, Winder collaborated with rapper Jessa Calderon to release the single "Rise and Shine."

== Awards ==
1. 2009 University of New Mexico's Best English 102 Sequence for New Instructors
2. 2009 Nominated for the First Peoples Fund's Community Spirit Award
3. 2010: Orlando Prize in poetry from the A Room of Her Own Foundation
4. 2012 Semi-Finalist for the Kenyon Review / Earthworks Prize for Indigenous Poetry
5. The National Center for American Indian Enterprise Development named her one of “40 Under 40” emerging American Indian leaders
6. 2014 Nominated for Best New Poets 2014 Anthology
7. 2017 First Peoples Fund, Artists in Business Leadership fellow

== Scholarships ==
1. 2011 Hillerman/McGarrity Scholarship in Creative Writing
2. 2009 Lynn Reyer Award in Tribal Community Development
3. 2007-2009 Andrew Mellon Mays Fellow
4. 2004-2008 Gates Millennium Scholar
