= What Made the Red Man Red? =

Song from Disney's Peter Pan

Song by Candy Candido and the Mellomen

from the album Peter Pan (1953 film)
- Released: February 5, 1953
- Genre: Traditional pop
- Length: 2:45
- Label: Walt Disney Records
- Songwriters: Sammy Fain; Sammy Cahn

"What Made the Red Man Red?" is a song from the 1953 Disney animated film Peter Pan with music by Sammy Fain and lyrics by Sammy Cahn, in which the Indians of the Neverland Tribe tell their story through dance and song. Some modern critics have described the sequence as offensive due to its reliance on exaggerated stereotypes. Although a similar depiction was displayed within J. M. Barrie's original play, later adaptations have reimagined the Natives.

== Production ==
Jonathan "Candy" Candido, who played the role of the Chief in Peter Pan, said the following in an interview with MousePlanet:

When I recorded [the song], I sang it with 10 bass singers from around Los Angeles. And if you hear the song, you'll notice my bass voice is almost twice as low as theirs ... You know, when you see the Indian chief, he's fat. I'm not fat. And he's real tall, and I'm kind of short. But you notice he looks like me. Also, he has the same dark eyebrows, and he plays with his hands like I do when I perform ... Ward Kimball's animation of the chief is full of the little visual gags that he always threw into his work, oftentimes just to keep himself amused. I especially love seeing how wildly exaggerated the chief's mouth shapes become, yet always manage to work well within the frame of his face.

— Jonathan "Candy" Candido, interview with MousePlanet

== Context ==
Peter Pan and Wendy come across the Indians (who refer to themselves as "Injuns") during their travels in Neverland after rescuing the Chief's daughter, Tiger Lily. Wishing to learn more about them, the Lost Boys ask the Indians three questions: "What made the red man red?", "When did he first say 'Ugh'?" and "Why does he ask you 'How?'" (a corruption of the Lakota word háu, which translates to "Hello" and is used only by men). The respective answers are 1) an ancestor blushing after kissing a woman; 2) when an ancestor "saw his mother-in-law"; and 3) to acquire all the knowledge about the world the Indians now possess. This song is performed by "the big-nosed, guttural Chief character" accompanied by his tribesmen, who answer the questions. The Indians pass the peace pipe to the children (which John smokes, but becomes nauseated after) as they tell their tale.

== Composition ==
Writer Kim McLarin of NPR described the composition as a "bouncy, drum-heavy song", while Neil Sinyard called it a "labored routine" in The Best of Disney (1988).

== Modern reception ==
Modern reception of the song has been generally negative, especially due to its use of slurs such as "squaw", gibberish utterances, and joking answers to the children's questions. Writing in Seeing Red: Hollywood's Pixelated Skins: American Indians and Film (2013), David Martinez said, "the animators took the liberty of demeaning an entire race in the name of entertainment." Wired described the song as "thoroughly appalling" and "arguably more racist than anything in the notorious Song of the South". Though Hollywood.com named the 1953 film as the third-best Peter Pan adaption that same year, it recommended that viewers "forget that whole 'What Made the Red Man Red?' part, for obvious reasons". Greg Ehrbar, writing in Mouse Tracks: The Story of Walt Disney Records (2013), said the song "veers precariously into politically incorrect territory". Sasha Houston Brown, Santee Sioux tribe member and adviser to the American Indian Success Program at Minneapolis Community and Technical College, said the song was dehumanizing and embarrassing to watch as a child.

In 2014, AllDay said that "the one time they break into song" is the only time the Native Americans do not speak in broken English throughout the film. Bustle described the song a "big ol' pile of racism", and The Guardian said that the song presents a risk of redface when performed live and is "exactly as alarming to modern eyes and ears as its title suggests". The following year, Media Diversified said the "horror that was the song" reinforces stereotypes and racist attitudes. Writing for Tor.com, American author and critic Mari Ness said that the "cartoon war dance" and song go even further than Barrie's play by "stat[ing] that the Indians are not just savages, but sexist savages, who force Wendy to go fetch firewood while the other boys have fun."

Marc Davis, one of the supervising animators of the 1953 film, said in an interview years after the production,

I'm not sure we would have done the Indians if we were making this movie now. And if we had we wouldn't do them the way we did back then... The Indians were Ward Kimball's stuff. Beautifully done. The Indians could not have been done that way nowadays. I like them. Very funny. Very entertaining, especially the Big Chief.

Disney historian Jim Korkis stated in attempt to clarify, "It is important to remember that Peter Pan was supposed to represent a young boy's impression of pirates, mermaids and Indians and, as a result, these fanciful creations bore more of a relation to popular culture storybooks than reality."

=== Legacy ===
When the film has been syndicated on television, the native scene has often been removed. Because of concerns around the representation of Indigenous characters, and this song in particular, the 2002 film Return to Never Land did not feature any Indian characters. However, they appear physically in the tie-in videogame Peter Pan: Adventures in Never Land. In Disney's Peter Pan, Jr. stage musical adaptation, the song is replaced by "What Makes the Brave Man Brave?", which focuses less on Native American stereotypes and more on what traits define a hero.

During production of the 2015 Warner Bros. live-action film Pan, the film's developers made a deliberate choice to distance the character of Tiger Lily and her people from Native American heritage, and reimagined them as lacking any particular ethnicity, in order to "avoid the racial insensitivities of... Disney's 1953 animated film, which infamously featured the song 'What Made the Red Man Red?'"

The song is sampled in the Frank Waln song of the same title, in which he raps about the legacy of genocide and colonialism and criticizes the original song for its alleged racism.
