= Abbott and Costello in the Foreign Legion =

1950 film by Charles Lamont

- Film poster by Reynold Brown
- Directed by: Charles Lamont
- Written by: John Grant; Martin Ragaway; Leonard Stern
- Produced by: Robert Arthur
- Starring: Bud Abbott; Lou Costello; Patricia Medina; Walter Slezak
- Narrated by: Jeff Chandler
- Cinematography: George Robinson
- Edited by: Frank Gross
- Music by: Joseph Gershenson
- Production company: Universal-International
- Distributed by: Universal-International
- Release dates: July 16, 1950 (U.S.); July 28, 1950 (Los Angeles); August 12, 1950 (New York)
- Running time: 80 minutes
- Country: United States
- Language: English
- Budget: $679,687
- Box office: $1,250,000

Abbott and Costello in the Foreign Legion (Note: On-screen title is Bud Abbott Lou Costello in the Foreign Legion.) is a black-and-white 1950 American comedy film directed by Charles Lamont and starring the comedy team of Abbott and Costello.

It is set in the French Sahara with the heroes having joined the French Foreign Legion.

== Plot ==
Bud Jones and Lou Hotchkiss are wrestling promoters in Brooklyn. Their star, the proud Abdullah, no longer wishes to follow the script for their prearranged bouts, especially as he is supposed to lose his next match. Abdullah leaves America to return to his homeland of Algeria. The promoters' financiers, a syndicate that has lent them $5,000 to bring Abdullah to the U.S., now require that they return the money or face the consequences. The two men follow Abdullah to Algiers to attempt to return him to the U.S.

Lou shows a local woman how to wrestle, but his lesson is misconstrued. Abdullah's cousin, Sheik Hamud El Khalid and a crooked Foreign Legionnaire, Sgt. Axmann, have been raiding a railroad construction site in order to extort protection money from the railroad company. When Bud and Lou arrive, they are mistaken for company spies, and the sheik and Axmann send three fearsome Arabs to attempt to murder them. As each attempt fails, the assassins' hatred for Bud and Lou intensifies, especially when Lou unintentionally outbids the sheik for six slave girls. One of girls, Nicole, is actually a French spy assigned to gain entry into the sheik's camp, so she had wanted the sheik to win the auction. The boys are chased and hide at the Foreign Legion headquarters, where Axmann tricks them into enlisting in the legion, with the induction ceremony conducted in French.

Their first duty is bayonet practice in the desert. The commandant suspects that there is a traitor among the legionnaires because the sheik correctly anticipates every one of the legion's moves (secretly through Axmann). The commandant then grants Bud and Lou a pass into town, where they discovers Axmann's alliance with the Arabs before meeting Nicole. She informs them that they must search Axmann's room for proof that he is a traitor, but he catches them in the act. However, they are spared and find themselves at a desert camp. At night, just before the camp is ambushed by the sheik's men, Bud and Lou wander off in search of a stray camel and escape death, but wander the desert with no water. Lou begins to envision mirages, including an ice-cream stand and a newspaper vendor. When Bud finds a real oasis, Lou thinks that it is another mirage.

Bud and Lou are eventually captured, along with Nicole, who is forced into Sheik Hamud's harem. The sheik orders that one of his wrestlers execute them, but the wrestler is Abdullah, who helps them escape so that he can avoid marriage to an unattractive woman. They head to Fort Apar, where they lure the sheik's men inside and then destroy it with an explosion. They are given medals by the commandant and an honorable discharge from the legion. Lou thanks Nicole for helping them and gives his award to her before they leave, only for Bud to learn that Lou is taking the six slave girls with them.

== Cast ==
- Bud Abbott as Bud Jones
- Lou Costello as Lou Hotchkiss
- Patricia Medina as Nicole Dupre
- Walter Slezak as Sgt. Axmann
- Douglass Dumbrille as Sheik Hamud El Khalid
- Leon Belasco as Hassam—Auctioneer
- Marc Lawrence as Frankie—Loan Shark
- William 'Wee Willie' Davis as Abdullah (as Wee Willie Davis)
- Tor Johnson as Abou Ben
- Sammy Menacker as Bertram the Magnificent (as Sam Menacker)
- Jack Raymond as Ali Ami
- Fred Nurney as Commandant
- Paul Fierro as Ibn
- Henry Corden as Ibrim
- Candy Candido as Skeleton (voice) (uncredited)
- Dan Seymour as Josef (uncredited)

== Production ==
In 1948, Abbott and Costello fired their agent Eddie Sherman. Just before the filming of Abbott and Costello in the Foreign Legion, they reconciled with Sherman and rehired him.

Originally scheduled to begin shooting in December 1949, filming was postponed for Lou Costello's operation for a gangrenous gallbladder in November 1949. However, Universal-International was suspicious that the medical issue was legitimate and temporarily suspended the duo and withheld their $6,500 weekly pay just before Christmas. Filming eventually began on April 28, 1950, and ended on May 29, 1950. Although he had a stunt double, Costello performed his own wrestling in the film, suffering a wrenched arm socket and a stretched tendon.

Universal wished to add a comedic bit with the rabbit from its recent film Harvey, but the original story's author Mary Chase refused to permit the character to appear in the film.

David Gorcey, a member of the comedy team the Bowery Boys, has a cameo appearance in the film. The voice of the skeleton in the film was provided by Candy Candido, who briefly became Abbott's partner in the 1960s after Costello's death.

Some music from Abbott and Costello Meet Frankenstein was recycled for the film.

According to Rudolph Grey's book Nightmare of Ecstasy, filmmaker Edward D. Wood Jr. worked on the film as a production assistant.

== Reception ==
In a contemporary review for The New York Times, critic A. H. Weiler called Abbott and Costello in the Foreign Legion a "consignment of corn" and wrote: "It may be assumed that after turning out so many exercises in what sometimes was construed as comedy, that the team of Abbott and Costello would become weary. And, in 'Abbott and Costello in the Foreign Legion,' their twenty-fifth excursion before the cameras ... it may be reported that the boys, the script. and the remainder of the cast are definitely tired. Plodding is the word for the pace of this number ... The plot, in this case, is as thin as the veil of houri."

A review in the Los Angeles Times described the film as containing "truly side-splitting gags" that was "paging shouts of glee" at theaters.

== Home media ==
This film has been released three times on DVD. Originally released as single DVD on August 12, 1998, it was released twice as part of two different Abbott and Costello collections: The Best of Abbott and Costello Volume Three (2004) and Abbott and Costello: The Complete Universal Pictures Collection (2008).
