= Campus Rhythm =

1943 film

- Directed by: Arthur Dreifuss
- Written by: Charles R. Marion; Ewart Adamson; Jack Palmer White; Albert Beich; Frank Tarloff
- Produced by: Lindsley Parsons
- Starring: Johnny Downs; Gale Storm; Robert Lowery
- Cinematography: Mack Stengler
- Edited by: Richard C. Currier
- Music by: Edward J. Kay
- Production company: Monogram Pictures
- Distributed by: Monogram Pictures
- Release date: November 19, 1943
- Running time: 63 minutes
- Country: United States
- Language: English

Campus Rhythm is a 1943 American musical film directed by Arthur Dreifuss and starring Johnny Downs, Gale Storm and Robert Lowery.

== Plot ==
Joan Abbott works as a singer on contract with a commercial sponsor called Crunchy-Wunchy Breakfast Foods. The contract is expiring, and Joan wants to take time off to go to college. However, her uncle, William 'Willie' Aloysius Smith, has power of attorney over her career and has signed a contract with J. P. Hartman to renew the contract, starting in six weeks. Hartman threatens to sue Uncle Willie for $5,000 if the contract is not renewed. Joan is angry with Uncle Willie for breaking his promise to allow her to go to college. She runs off to enroll in Rawley University under the assumed name of Susie Smith, the name of Hartman's secretary.

At the college, under the Susie Smith alias, Joan meets Buzz O'Hara, the organizer of a fraternity band, and 'Scoop' Davis, the editor of the campus newspaper. Scoop hires Joan to work at the newspaper.

Back in New York, Uncle Willie and Hartman try to locate Joan. They decide to tell the press about Joan being missing, and use the story to gain publicity. Back at Rawley, Scoop reads the story in a metropolitan newspaper and tells Joan that it is all a publicity stunt rather than serious journalism. When Scoop asks Joan to find of a picture of Joan Abbott in the newspaper photo file, Joan hides it. Scoop asks Joan to write an editorial denouncing the alleged publicity stunt.

At her sorority house, Joan coaches Babs Marlow, who sings with the fraternity band. Cynthia Walker, another member of the sorority, suspects Joan's real identity. Later, privately in her room, Cynthia listens to a recording of Joan Abbott singing, and decides to write a letter to J. P. Hartman.

A sponsor arranges with Hartman to set up a contest for college bands to be broadcast on radio. Buzz enrolls his band in the contest with Babs as the lead singer. Just before the broadcast, Babs gets laryngitis, and Buzz gets Joan to replace her. During the broadcast, Uncle Willie and Hartman hear a familiar voice on the radio from the broadcast. Susie Smith, Hartman's secretary, identifies the voice as Joan's. Later on campus, Buzz receives a letter saying his group won the contest. Hartman visits the campus and reveals Joan's real identity to all.

Joan refuses to honor the contract that Uncle Willie signed on her behalf, unless one condition is met: Buzz's band must accompany her while singing on radio. Hartman agrees with the condition. Everyone is happy, and the film concludes with Joan singing with the fraternity band in a broadcast studio.

== Cast ==
- Johnny Downs as 'Scoop' Davis
- Gale Storm as Joan Abbott, aka Susie Smith
- Robert Lowery as Buzz O'Hara
- Douglas Leavitt as Uncle William 'Willie' Aloysius Smith
- Herbert Heyes as J.P. Hartman
- Marie Blake as Susie Smith - Hartman's secretary
- Claudia Drake as Cynthia Walker
- GeGe Pearson as Babs Marlow
- Johnny Duncan as Freshie, a Freshman
- Candy Candido as Harold
- Genevieve Grazis as Dancer

== Bibliography ==
- Tucker, David C. Gale Storm: A Biography and Career Record. McFarland, 2018.
