= How (greeting) =

Lakota language greeting

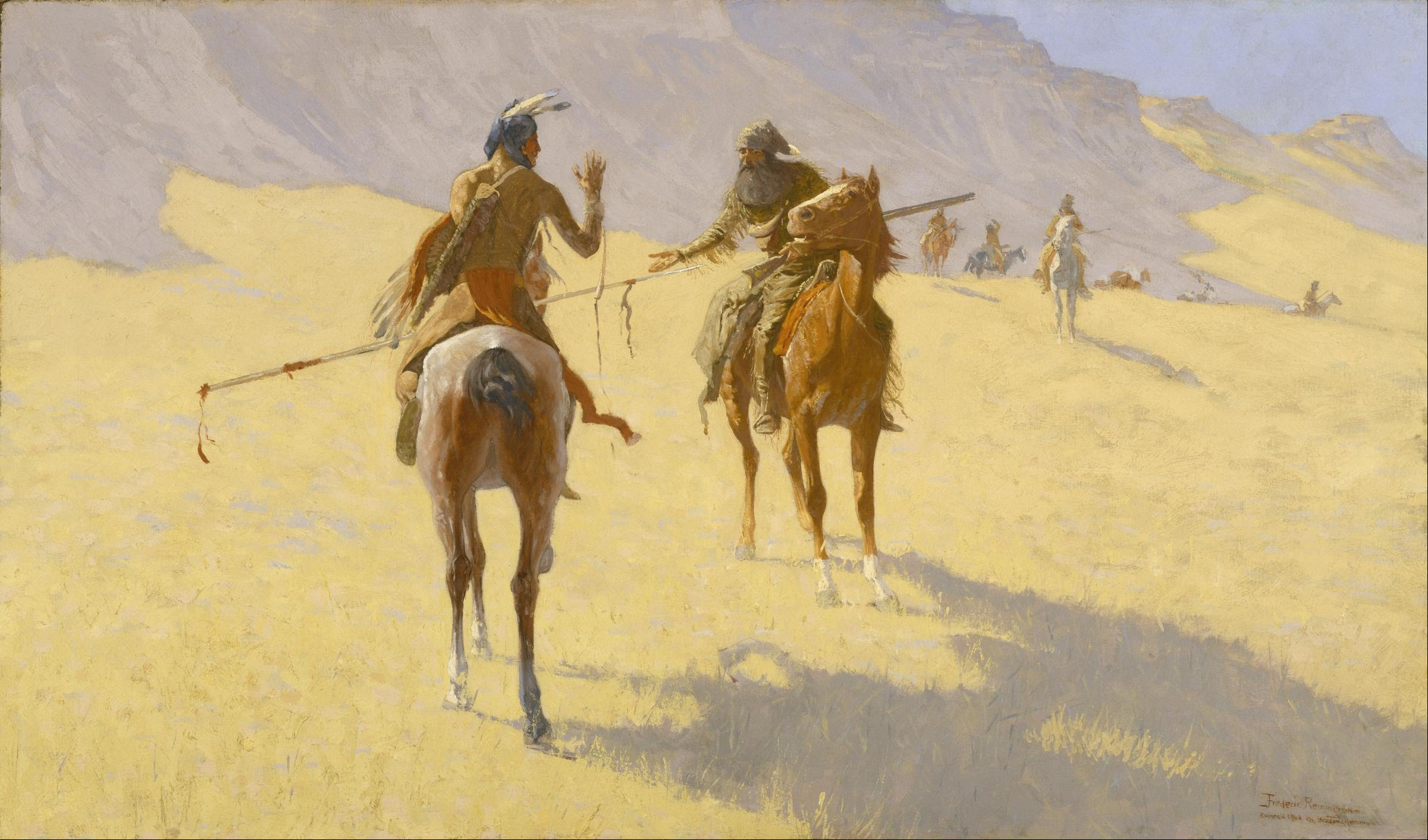
Frederic Remington's The Parley, 1903

The word "how" is a pop culture anglicization of the Lakota word háu, a Lakota language greeting by men to men. The term how is often found in older Hollywood movies and various novels that depicted American Indians, e.g. those of James Fenimore Cooper or Karl May.

== Background ==
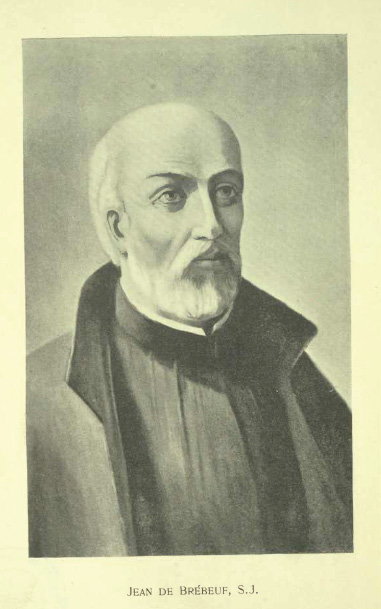
Jean de Brébeuf, French Jesuit missionary, c. 1627

The Oxford English Dictionary (OED) gives [haːʊ̯] ("how") as the pronunciation, and claims Jesuit missionary Jean de Brébeuf had described the use of the term as an interjection of approval with the Wendat (Hurons). De Brébeuf described individual speakers using Condayauendi Ierhayde cha nonhwicwahachen (Note: transl. That is my thought on the subject under discussion.) to signify the end of their speaking, which was answered by the community with a long "Hooow".

Longman Webster describes Howgh as a greeting of the Lakota, Dakota, and/or Nakoda peoples; giving "Háu kola" (Hallo friend) as a Lakota language greeting. However, it would be the only Lakota term using a diphthong and is possibly of external origin. Dakota people and Omaha people use slightly different versions. Francis Parkman, in his book The Oregon Trail, gives a first-person account of three weeks spent hunting buffalo with a band of Oglala Lakota in 1846. He mentions their use of "How". By 1900 "Good morning" was the preferred greeting among Omaha.

== Usage ==
Karl May, in his works of fiction, regularly used Howgh as a term expressing a Rule of Order, and a longing for consensus.

"Howgh", "Uff!", Manitou and Lakota "Hoka Hey" have had a major influence on the popular image of Native Americans in German-speaking countries. Howgh gained popularity as a reference to Native Americans through Cooper's and Parkman's books. By 1917, it was so stereotypically accepted that it found its way into US World War I propaganda depicting Native American soldiers:

[Wilhelm II] killum papoose und killum squaw, so Jo Fixum will find this Kaiser and stickum bayonet clear through. Ugh! [sic]

In the 1948 Tom and Jerry short "Kitty Foiled", Jerry and the canary say "How" as they dress themselves as Native Americans.

In the 1950s, "How" and primitive utterances like "Ugg-a-Wugg!" were used for two songs in two adaptations of Peter Pan; "What Made the Red Man Red?" in Walt Disney's 1953 animated film and "Ugg-a-Wugg" in Edwin Lester's 1954 musical. The latter featured white actors in stereotypical costumes, performing what they presented as "Indian dance" numbers and singing gibberish.

Author Raymond Steadman was irritated by the usage of what he viewed as a stereotypical phrase, and closed with "Reader gettum sick? Have-um enough?" [sic]

Howgh also appears in German pop songs depicting stereotypes of Native Americans, such as in "Indianer" by Nena (lyrics by Carlo Karges) and Gus Backus "Da sprach der alte Häuptling der Indianer" ("then spoke the old chieftain of the Indians", covered e.g. by Wildecker Herzbuben and Wirtschaftswunder).

== See also ==
- Stereotypes of Indigenous peoples of Canada and the United States
- Native Americans in German popular culture
- Native Americans in film
- How (TV series)
