= Candy Candido =

American actor (1913–1999)

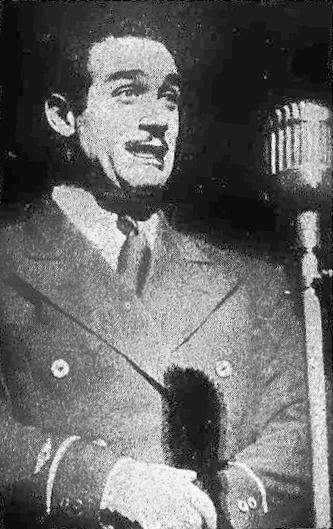
- Candido in 1943
- Born: Jonathan Joseph Candido; December 25, 1913; New Orleans, Louisiana, U.S.
- Died: May 19, 1999 (aged 85); Burbank, California, U.S.
- Resting place: San Fernando Mission Cemetery, Mission Hills, Los Angeles, California, U.S.
- Occupation: Actor
- Years active: 1934–1995
- Spouse: Anita Bivona (m. 1933)
- Children: 4

Jonathan Joseph "Candy" Candido (December 25, 1913 – May 19, 1999) was an American radio performer and voice actor. He was best remembered for his famous line "I'm feeling mighty low" on Jimmy Durante's radio show. He voiced characters in several Disney animated movies, including Peter Pan (1953), Sleeping Beauty (1959) and Robin Hood (1973). Candido was known for providing many animal vocalizations in his movies and was dubbed "The Man of a Thousand Voices".

== Early and personal life ==
Born as Jonathan Candido on Christmas Day in 1913 in New Orleans, Louisiana, Candido was a bassist and vocalist in Ted Fio Rito's big band. They can be seen in a soundie, "Ma, He's Making Eyes at Me". He was a childhood friend of Louis Prima's, becoming part of his band in 1924. In 1933, he married Anita Bivona. He adhered to the Catholic faith.

== Career ==
=== Radio ===
Candido's distinctive, four-octave speaking voice became familiar to radio listeners and moviegoers. Speaking his lines in his normal tenor, he would suddenly adopt a high, squeaky soprano and just as suddenly plunge into a gruff bass. His weekly repetition of "I'm feelin' miiiighty low" on Jimmy Durante's radio show made it a national catchphrase. The running gag became so familiar that he recorded a song of the same title with Durante. The line can be heard in the 1950 Bugs Bunny cartoon Homeless Hare, although it was not spoken there by Candido.

=== Voice acting ===
Candido provided the voice of an angry apple tree in The Wizard of Oz (1939), and provided the voice of a skeleton in Abbott and Costello in the Foreign Legion, and he later teamed with Bud Abbott during Abbott's attempted comeback in 1960. He was the voice of the bear in the Gentle Ben TV series, and he worked as a voice actor on animated films, notably for Walt Disney, where he portrayed the voice of the Indian Chief in Peter Pan (1953), one of Maleficent's goons in Sleeping Beauty (1959), the Captain of the Guard the crocodile in Robin Hood (1973), and the deep-voiced prisoner in The Haunted Mansion attraction in Disneyland. Other animated films with Candido voices include Chuck Jones's adaptation of The Phantom Tollbooth (1970) and the Ralph Bakshi movies Heavy Traffic (1973) and Hey Good Lookin' (1982). His personal favorite role was as Fidget the peg-legged bat in The Great Mouse Detective (1986).

=== Films ===
His various credited and uncredited roles as an actor, bassist and vocalist in live-action films include Sadie McKee (1934), Roberta (1935), Only Angels Have Wings (1939), Rhythm Parade (1942), Campus Rhythm (1943), Sarge Goes to College (1947), Smart Politics (1948), and The Great Rupert (1950).

=== Recording ===
Candido recorded a few children's 78 RPM records for Capitol Records:

- CAS-3105 - Side One "I'm Popeye the Sailor Man", Side Two "The Little White Duck" (1952)
- CAS-3156 - Side One "You're Nothin' But a Nothin'", Side Two "Barnacle Bill the Sailor" (1953)

== Death ==
Candido died from natural causes in his sleep at the age of 85 on May 19, 1999, in his home in Burbank, California. He was survived by his wife Anita, four children, eight grandchildren, seven great-grandchildren, and two great-great-grandchildren. He was interred in San Fernando Mission Cemetery.

== Filmography ==
- Sadie McKee (1934) – Candy of 'Coco and Candy' – Bass Player
- Roberta (1935) – Candy – Trick-voiced Wabash Indianian (uncredited)
- Broadway Gondolier (1935) – Candy (uncredited)
- Mama Steps Out (1937) – Bosco (uncredited)
- Something to Sing About (1937) – Candy (bassist in the band)
- Cowboy from Brooklyn (1938) – Spec
- Charlie Cuckoo (1939) – Charlie Cuckoo (voice, uncredited)
- Only Angels Have Wings (1939) – Bass Player (uncredited)
- The Wizard of Oz (1939) – Angry Apple Tree (voice, uncredited)
- A Haunting We Will Go (1939) – Papa Ghost (voice, uncredited)
- A Squirt in Time (1940) – Cylinder (voice, uncredited)
- Heart of the Rio Grande (1942) – Basso dubbing for Frog and Tadpole (uncredited)
- Rhythm Parade (1942) – Candy
- Campus Rhythm (1943) – Harold
- Sarge Goes to College (1947) – Bass and Vocals, The Jam Session
- Smart Politics (1948) – Alvin, Peabody's Nephew
- Cinderella (1950) – Gus (voice, uncredited)
- The Great Rupert (1950) – Molineri – Florist
- Riding High (1950) – Musician (uncredited)
- Abbott and Costello in the Foreign Legion (1950) – Skeleton (voice, uncredited)
- Peter Pan (1953) – Indian Chief (voice)
- King Creole (1958) – King Creole Doorman (uncredited)
- Plunderers of Painted Flats (1959) – Bartender
- Sleeping Beauty (1959) – Maleficent's Goon (voice, uncredited)
- Babes in Toyland (1961) – Trees (voice, uncredited)
- The Phantom Tollbooth (1970) – Awful DYNN (voice)
- Heavy Traffic (1973) – The Mafia Messenger (voice)
- Robin Hood (1973) – Captain of the Guards (voice, uncredited)
- Herbie Rides Again (1974) – (voice)
- The Rescuers (1977) – Brutus and Nero (vocal sound effects, uncredited)
- Hey Good Lookin' (1982) – Sal (voice)
- The Great Mouse Detective (1986) – Fidget / Bar Patron (voice)
- Mighty Mouse: The New Adventures (1987) – (voice)
