= Peter Pan (1953 film) =

Animated Disney film

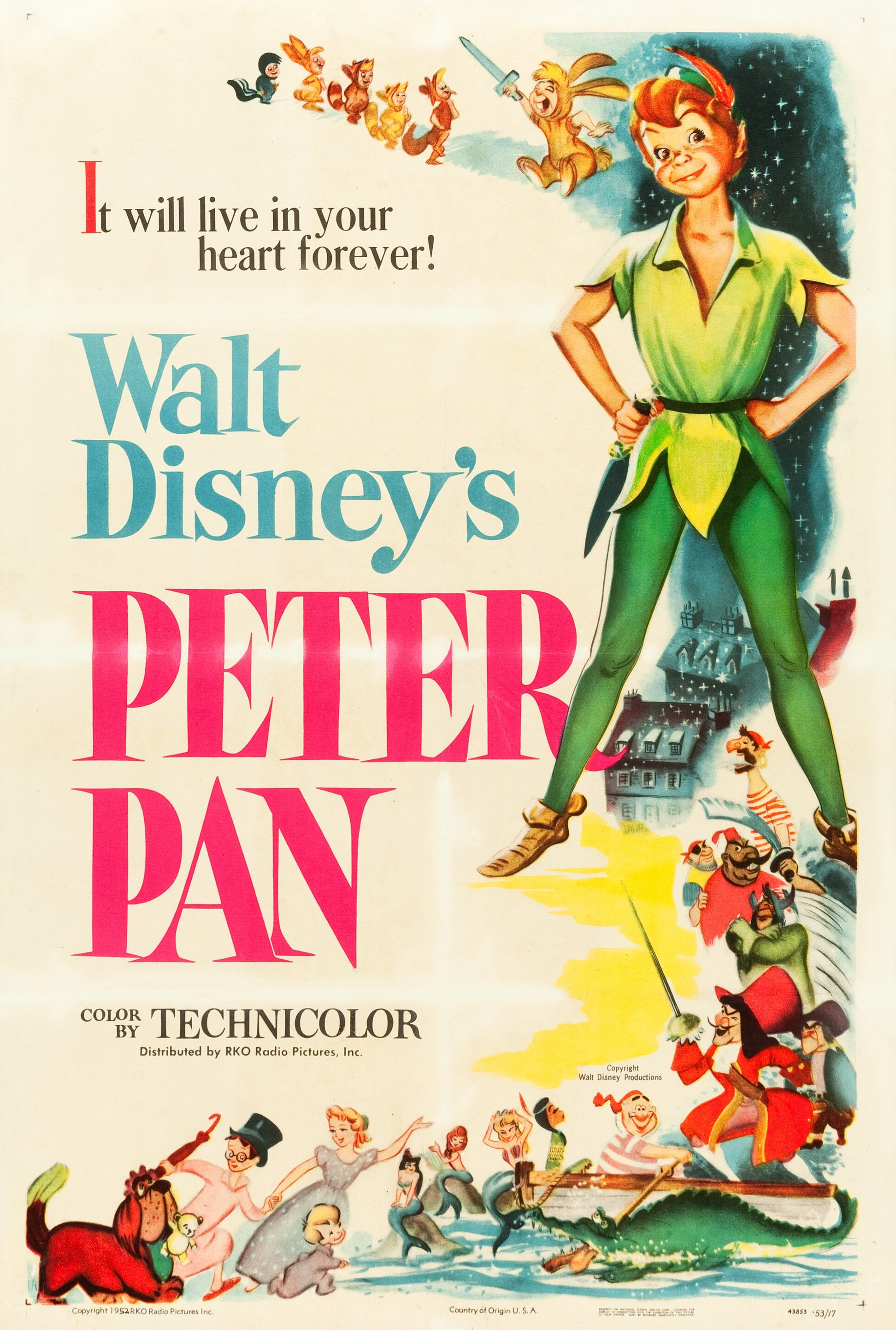
- Theatrical release poster
- Directed by: Hamilton Luske; Clyde Geronimi; Wilfred Jackson
- Story by: Ted Sears; Erdman Penner; Bill Peet; Winston Hibler; Joe Rinaldi; Milt Banta; Ralph Wright; Bill Cottrell
- Based on: Peter Pan by J. M. Barrie
- Produced by: Walt Disney
- Starring: Bobby Driscoll; Kathryn Beaumont; Hans Conried; Bill Thompson; Heather Angel; Paul Collins; Tommy Luske; Candy Candido; Tom Conway; Roland Dupree; Don Barclay
- Edited by: Donald Halliday
- Music by: Oliver Wallace
- Production company: Walt Disney Productions
- Distributed by: RKO Radio Pictures
- Release date: February 5, 1953
- Running time: 77 minutes
- Country: United States
- Language: English
- Budget: $4 million
- Box office: $87.4 million (United States and Canada)

Peter Pan is a 1953 American animated fantasy adventure film produced by Walt Disney Productions and released by RKO Radio Pictures. Based on J. M. Barrie's 1904 play of the same name, the film was directed by Hamilton Luske, Clyde Geronimi, and Wilfred Jackson. Featuring the voices of Bobby Driscoll, Kathryn Beaumont, Hans Conried, Bill Thompson, Heather Angel, Paul Collins, Tommy Luske, Candy Candido, Tom Conway, Roland Dupree and Don Barclay, the film's plot follows Wendy Darling and her two brothers, who meet the eternally-young Peter Pan and travel with him to the island of Never Land to stay young, where they also have to face Peter's archenemy, Captain Hook.

In 1935, Walt Disney began considering plans to adapt Barrie's play into an animated feature. He purchased the film rights from Paramount Pictures in 1938, and began preliminary development in the next year. However, following the attack on Pearl Harbor, Disney shelved the project when his studio was contracted by the United States government to produce training and war propaganda films. The project sat idle in development for the rest of the decade until it experienced a turnaround in 1949. To assist the animators, live-action reference footage was shot with actors on soundstages. It also marked the last Disney film in which all nine members of Disney's Nine Old Men worked together as directing animators.

Peter Pan was released on February 5, 1953, becoming the final Disney animated feature released through RKO before Disney founded his own distribution company. The film was entered into the 1953 Cannes Film Festival, Upon its release, the film earned generally positive reviews from film critics and was a box office success. Its representation of the Native Americans received retrospective criticism.

A sequel, titled Return to Never Land, was released in 2002, and a series of direct-to-DVD prequels focusing on Tinker Bell began in 2008. A television series featuring the characters, Jake and the Never Land Pirates, was released in 2015. A live-action adaptation of the film was released on Disney+ in 2023.

== Plot ==
In Edwardian London 1904, George and Mary Darling's preparations to attend a party are disrupted by the antics of their boys, John and Michael, who are acting out a Peter Pan story told to them by their elder sister Wendy. An irritated George demands that Wendy drop the stories and move out of the nursery, since "sooner or later, people have to grow up" and also chains Nana the female dog outside because she is a dog and not a nurse. Later that night, Peter himself arrives in the nursery to find his lost shadow. He persuades Wendy to come to Never Land, where she will never have to grow up, and she and the boys fly there with the begrudging help of the pixie Tinker Bell.

A ship of pirates is anchored off Never Land, led by Captain Hook and his first mate, Mr. Smee. Hook wants revenge on Peter for cutting off his hand, but fears the crocodile which consumed the hand, knowing it is eager to eat the rest of him. When Pan and the Darlings arrive, Hook shoots at them with a cannon, and Peter sends the Darlings off to safety while he baits the pirates. Tinker Bell, who is jealous of Peter's attention to Wendy, convinces the Lost Boys that Peter has ordered them to shoot down Wendy. Tinker Bell's treachery is soon found out, and Peter banishes her for a week. John and Michael set off with the Lost Boys to find the island's Indians; however, the Indians capture the group, believing them to be responsible for taking the chief's daughter, Tiger Lily.

Meanwhile, Peter takes Wendy to see the mermaids, who flee in terror when Hook arrives on the scene. Peter and Wendy see that Hook and Smee have captured Tiger Lily, to force her to disclose the location of Peter's hideout. Peter frees Tiger Lily and returns her to the Chief, and the tribe honors Peter. Meanwhile, Hook takes advantage of Tinker Bell's jealousy of Wendy, tricking the fairy into revealing Peter's secret hideout instead.

Wendy and her brothers eventually grow homesick and plan to return to London. They invite Peter and the Lost Boys to join them and be adopted by the Darlings. The Lost Boys agree, but Peter does not want to grow up and refuses. The pirates lie in wait, and capture the Lost Boys and the Darlings as they exit the lair, leaving behind a time bomb to kill Peter. Hook attempts to persuade his captives to join the crew, threatening to make them walk the plank if they refuse. Tinker Bell learns of the plot, just in time to snatch the bomb from Peter as it explodes.

Peter rescues Tinker Bell from the rubble, and together they rescue Wendy, confronting the pirates and releasing the children. Peter engages Hook in combat as the children fight off the crew, and defeats him. Hook falls into the sea and swims away, pursued by the crocodile. Peter commandeers the deserted ship and, assisted by Tinker Bell's pixie dust, flies it to London with the children aboard although the Lost Boys choose to stay with Peter Pan in Neverland.

George and Mary Darling return home and find Wendy sleeping at the nursery's open window. Wendy awakens and excitedly tells about their adventures and that she's ready to grow up but her father who has softened up tells her she can stay in the nursery and even brings Nana back inside. The parents look out the window and see Hook's pirate ship in the clouds. George recognizes the ship, implying that he himself went to Neverland when he was a boy.

== Voice cast ==
- Bobby Driscoll as Peter Pan, the cocky and very adventurous leader of the Lost Boys of Never Land, where he resides due to his refusal to grow up. He is frequently accompanied by his best friend, the hot-headed pixie Tinker Bell.
- Kathryn Beaumont as Wendy Darling, the imaginative and very caring oldest child of the Darling family, who loves to tell the stories about Peter Pan and his adventures.
- Hans Conried as Captain Hook, a ruthless and obsessive pirate captain who seeks lots of revenge on Peter Pan for having his left hand chopped off and fed to the Crocodile in a battle.
  - Continuing the tradition of the stage play, Conried also voices George Darling, the Darling children's very strict and short-tempered, but loving father and Mary's husband.
- Bill Thompson as Mr. Smee, Hook's meek and loyal first mate and personal assistant.
  - Thompson also voiced several members of Hook's pirate crew.
- Heather Angel as Mary Darling, the Darling children's calm and gentle mother and George's wife, who is much more understanding of Wendy's stories than her husband, even though she takes them with a pinch of salt.
- Paul Collins as John Darling, a very smart and mature beyond his years middle child of the Darling family.
- Tommy Luske as Michael Darling, the youngest and the most sensitive child of the Darling family, who constantly carries a teddy bear with him.
- Candy Candido as the Indian Chief, a fierce-looking but well-meaning leader of the Indian Tribe and Tiger Lily's father.

Additionally, Stuffy Singer, Johnny McGovern, Robert Ellis, and Jeffrey Silver provided voices for Slightly, the Twins, Cubby, and Nibs – The Lost Boys, Peter's right-hand boys, dressed as various animals. June Foray, Connie Hilton, Karen Kester, and Margaret Kerry voiced the mermaids, vain and shallow inhabitants of the Mermaid Lagoon who are infatuated with Peter Pan. Foray also voiced the Squaw Woman, who orders Wendy to get firewood while everyone else celebrates Peter's rescue of Tiger Lily. Tom Conway was the film's narrator.

== Production ==
=== Early development ===
We were living on a farm, and one morning as we walked to school, we found entrancing new posters. A road company was coming to the nearby town of Marceline and the play they were presenting was Peter Pan with Maude Adams. It took most of the contents of two toy saving banks to buy our tickets, but my brother Roy and I didn't care ... I took many memories away from the theater with me, but the most thrilling of all was the vision of Peter flying through the air. Shortly afterward, Peter Pan was chosen for our school play and I was allowed to play Peter. No actor ever identified himself with the part he was playing more than I – and I was more realistic than Maude Adams in at least one particular: I actually flew through the air! Roy was using a block and tackle to hoist me. It gave way, and I flew right into the faces of the surprised audience.

— Walt Disney on his introduction to the story of Peter Pan

Walt Disney was familiar with J. M. Barrie's play Peter Pan, or the Boy Who Wouldn't Grow Up since childhood, having seen a touring production starring Maude Adams at the Cater Opera House in Marceline, Missouri, in 1913. In 1935, he first expressed interest in adapting the play as his second animated feature film after Snow White and the Seven Dwarfs, which was still in production at the time. During his acquisition spree in Europe in April 1938, Roy O. Disney went to London to acquire the rights from the Great Ormond Street Hospital for Sick Children, but Paramount Pictures had already secured the live-action screen rights. The hospital unsuccessfully offered to have Disney and Paramount make an agreement; however, by October of that year, Walt had purchased the animation rights from Paramount and commissioned Dorothy Ann Blank to develop the story. In January 1939, Disney signed a £5,000 contract with the hospital, and by May of that year, as the story work was in the preliminary stages, he had several animators in mind for some of the characters – Bill Tytla was considered for the pirates, Norman Ferguson for Nana, and Fred Moore for Tinker Bell.

During this time, many possible interpretations of the story were explored. In the earliest treatment, written by Blank on April 14, 1939, the film would start by telling Peter Pan's backstory, which was based on Barrie's 1906 book Peter Pan in Kensington Gardens. However, during a story meeting the following month, Disney decided that they "ought to get right into the story itself, where Peter Pan comes to the house to get his shadow. That's where the story picks up. How Peter came to be is really another story." Disney also explored the idea of opening the film in Never Land with Peter coming to Wendy's house to kidnap her as a mother for the Lost Boys. Eventually, it was decided that the kidnapping plot was too dark, and Disney went back to Barrie's original play, in which Peter comes to get his shadow back and Wendy herself is eager to see Never Land.

By early 1940, David Hall, who had also worked on Alice in Wonderland, created first exploratory storyboards and concept art for Peter Pan. Later that year, Disney personally attempted to contact Maude Adams, who by then had retired from acting and was teaching drama at Stephens College. Disney notified her of his plans for an animated feature, and requested for her to view an early reel of the film that the studio had produced for her approval. He further affirmed that his studio would send the necessary screening equipment to Columbia College for the presentation and that it could be open to any Stephens College student or faculty member interested in attending. Adams, however, rejected Disney's proposal. In a 1941 studio memo to Kay Kamen, he wrote: "She wouldn't even give me the courtesy of looking at our reel. Her reasons were to the effect that 'Peter whom she created was to her real life and blood, while another's creation of this character would only be a ghost to her'. It seems pretty silly and from my point of view, I would say that Miss Adams is simply living in the past."

=== Production delays ===
By 1941, the basic story structure of Peter Pan was completed, but later that year, following the bombing of Pearl Harbor, the United States military took control of Walt Disney Productions. It commissioned the studio to produce training and war propaganda films, thus pre-production work on Peter Pan, as well as on Alice in Wonderland (1951), was suspended. However, the Bank of America allowed for production on Peter Pan, along with The Wind in the Willows (1949), to continue during World War II. After the war had ended, pre-production of the film resumed with Jack Kinney as director. At the time, Kinney had considered leaving Walt Disney Productions for the Metro-Goldwyn-Mayer cartoon studio, but wartime restrictions prevented it. Since he did not want Kinney to get out of his contract, Disney appointed Kinney to direct Peter Pan.

Impatient with the delays, Disney asked Kinney to work on sequences consecutively rather than finishing the entire script before it was storyboarded, so that a scene would be approved at a morning story meeting and then immediately put into development. Six months later, during a storyboard meeting, Kinney presented a two-and-a-half-hour presentation, during which Disney sat silently and then stated, "You know, I've been thinking about Cinderella."

=== Return to actual production ===
By 1947, Walt Disney Productions' financial health started to improve again. Around this time, Disney acknowledged the need for sound economic policies, but emphasized to his financial backers that slashing production would be suicidal to the studio. In order to restore the studio to profitability, Disney expressed his desire to return to producing full-length animated films. By then, three animated projects—Cinderella, Alice in Wonderland, and Peter Pan—were in development. Disney had felt the characters in Alice in Wonderland and Peter Pan were too cold, but because Cinderella (1950) contained similar elements when compared to Snow White and the Seven Dwarfs (1937), he decided to greenlight Cinderella. In May 1949, Variety reported that Peter Pan had been placed back into production.

The scene in the nursery went through many alterations. In one version, it is Mrs. Darling who finds Peter Pan's shadow and shows it to Mr. Darling, as in the original play. In another version of the film, Nana goes to Never Land with Pan and the Darling children, the story being told through her eyes. In another interpretation of the story, John Darling is left behind for being too serious, practical and boring, but story artist Ralph Wright convinced Disney to have John go with the others to Never Land. This adaptation also included Wendy bringing her Peter Pan picture book and Peter and the children eating an "imaginary dinner". At one point, a party in Peter's hideout was conceived at which Tinker Bell becomes humiliated and, in her rage, tells Captain Hook the location of Peter Pan's hideout of her own free will. However, Disney felt that this story was contrary to Tinker Bell's character; instead, he had Captain Hook kidnapping Tinker Bell and persuading her to tell him. In Barrie's play, Captain Hook puts poison in Peter's dose of medicine and Tinker Bell saves Peter by drinking the poison herself, only to be revived by the applause of the theater audience. After much debate, Disney discarded this story development, fearing it would be difficult to achieve in a film.

In earlier scripts, there were more scenes involving the pirates and mermaids that were similar to those with the dwarfs in Snow White and the Seven Dwarfs. Ultimately, these scenes were cut for pacing reasons. The film concept was also a bit darker at one point than that of the finished product; for example, there were scenes involving Captain Hook being eaten by the crocodile like in the original play, the Darling family mourning over their lost children and Pan and the children discovering the pirates' treasure loaded with booby traps.

=== Casting ===
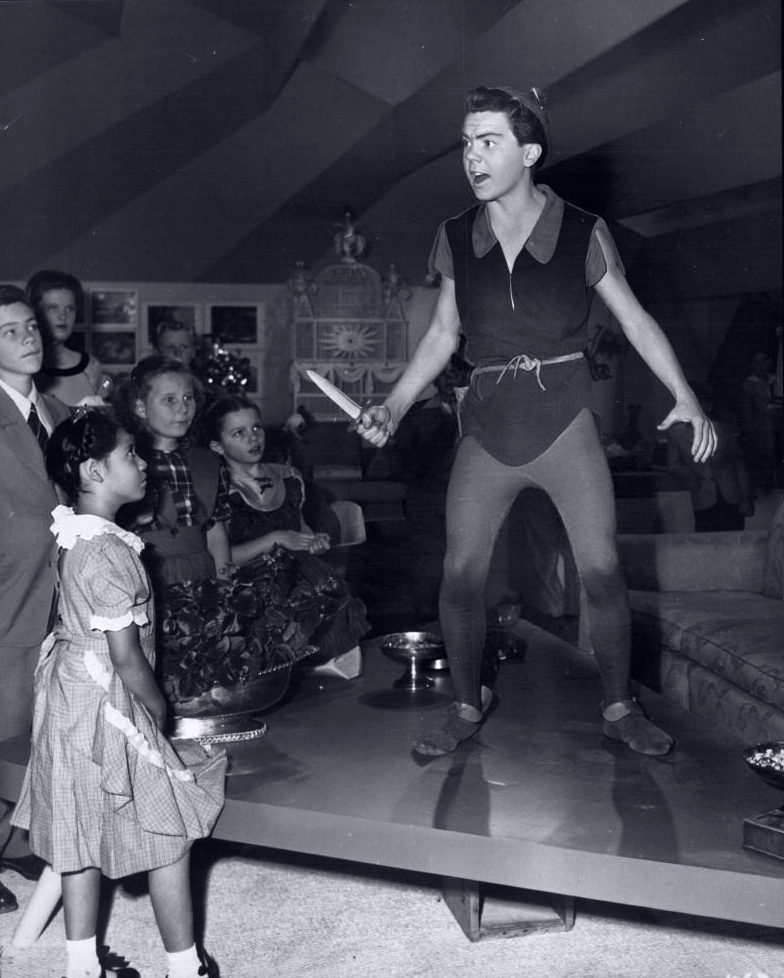
Bobby Driscoll portraying Peter Pan in The Walt Disney Christmas Show (1951).

Walt Disney originally wanted to cast Mary Martin as Peter Pan, but Roy Disney disagreed, finding Martin's voice "too heavy, matured and sophisticated". (Note: Martin would later portray Peter Pan in the 1954 Broadway production of the original play.) Jean Arthur also approached Walt Disney to consider her for the role. Bobby Driscoll, who was Disney's first contract child actor and had previously starred in such films as Song of the South (1946), So Dear to My Heart (1948), and Treasure Island (1950), was ultimately cast. This was the first time that a male actor was cast as Peter Pan, breaking a tradition of women portraying him in both films and stage productions. Driscoll also provided some of the live-action reference for the character. Peter Pan was Driscoll's last Disney film, as his contract with the studio was abruptly terminated shortly after its release.

For the role of Wendy, Disney wanted a "gentle and gracefully feminine" voice, which he found in Kathryn Beaumont, who had previously voiced the title character in Alice in Wonderland (1951) and had just finished working on the film. Disney initially offered the role of Captain Hook to Cary Grant, which the latter was "intrigued with", but eventually Hans Conried was cast as both Hook and, in keeping the tradition of the stage play, George Darling.

=== Animation ===
==== Live-action reference ====
As with previous Disney animated features since Snow White and the Seven Dwarfs (1937), a live-action version with the actors performing to a prerecorded dialogue track was filmed to serve as an aid to animators. Margaret Kerry received a call to audition to serve as the live-action reference for Tinker Bell. For the live-action reference, Kerry said she had to hold out her arms and pretend to fly for all the scenes requiring it. Additionally, Kerry served as reference for one of the mermaids, along with Connie Hilton and June Foray.

At the same time, the studio was looking for an actor to portray Peter Pan, to which Kerry suggested her dancing teacher Roland Dupree. He was interviewed and eventually won the role, providing visual reference for the flying and action sequences. Bobby Driscoll also served as the live-action reference model for Peter Pan, although he was mainly used for the close-up scenes. Kathryn Beaumont, who was the voice of Wendy, performed the live-action reference footage for the character.

Hans Conried completed the voice work over the course of a few days, but served as the live-action reference for two and a half years.

==== Character animation ====
In a 1978 TV special From Fantasia to Fantasyland, Milt Kahl stated he had wanted to animate Captain Hook but was instead assigned to animate Peter Pan and the Darling children; he claimed he was "outmaneuvered". During production, while animating Peter Pan, Kahl claimed that the hardest thing to animate was a character floating in mid-air. While observing the animation of Peter Pan, Disney complained that the animators had let too many of Bobby Driscoll's facial features find their way into the character design, telling Kahl that "[t]hey are too masculine, too old. There is something wrong there." Kahl replied, "You want to know what's wrong!?... What's wrong is that they don't have any talent in the place."

Frank Thomas was assigned to animate Captain Hook, though he faced conflicting creative visions of the character. Story artist Ed Penner viewed Hook as "a very foppish, not strong, dandy-type, who loved all the finery. Kind of a con man. [Co-director Gerry] Geronimi saw him as an Ernest Torrence: a mean, heavy sort of character who used his hook menacingly." When Disney saw Thomas' first test scenes, he said, "Well, that last scene has something I like I think you're beginning to get him. I think we better wait and let Frank go on a little further." Because Thomas could not animate every scene of Hook, certain sequences were given to Wolfgang Reitherman, such as Hook trying to escape the crocodile at Skull Rock.

Ollie Johnston animated Mr. Smee. To best capture his comedic yet fear-ridden, sycophantic personality, Johnston used a variation of the Dwarf design from Snow White, and had Mr. Smee blink repeatedly. Johnston's former mentor, Fred Moore, worked in his unit as a character animator for Smee's minor scenes. Moore also animated the mermaids and the Lost Boys. The film would be Moore's final work as he died in a traffic accident on November 22, 1952.

== Music ==
Peter Pan

Studio album by Oliver Wallace
- Released: 1953
- Label: Disneyland Records

Frank Churchill wrote several songs for the film during the early 1940s, and Charles Walcott wrote additional songs in 1941. When work on Peter Pan resumed in 1944, Eliot Daniel composed songs for the film. However, this version of Peter Pan was shelved so the studio could complete Cinderella. In April 1950, it was reported that Sammy Cahn and Sammy Fain were composing songs for Peter Pan. The incidental music score for the movie is composed by Oliver Wallace.

=== Songs ===
The melody for "The Second Star to the Right" was originally written for Alice in Wonderland as part of a song to be entitled "Beyond the Laughing Sky". Some Disneyland-issued compilations give the title as "Second Star to the Right" (no "The"); see, for example, 50 Happy Years of Disney Favorites (Disneyland Records, STER-3513, Side II). "What Made the Red Man Red?" became controversial because of its stereotypical portrayal of Native Americans. "Never Smile at a Crocodile" was cut from the movie soundtrack, but was included for the 1997 Walt Disney Records CD release. The song, with lyrics, also appears in the Sing-Along Songs video series and the corresponding Canta Con Nosotros title, where it is titled "Al reptil no hay que sonreír".

Original songs performed in the film include:

No.	Title	Lyrics	Music	Performer(s)	Length
1.	"The Second Star to the Right"	Sammy Cahn	Sammy Fain	The Jud Conlon Chorus & The Mellomen
2.	"You Can Fly!"	Sammy Cahn	Sammy Fain	The Jud Conlon Chorus & The Mellomen
3.	"A Pirate's Life"	Erdman Penner	Oliver Wallace	The Mellomen
4.	"Following the Leader"	Ted Sears & Winston Hibler	Oliver Wallace	Paul Collins, Tommy Luske & Cast
5.	"What Made the Red Man Red?"	Sammy Cahn	Sammy Fain	Candy Candido & The Mellomen
6.	"Your Mother and Mine"	Sammy Cahn	Sammy Fain	Kathryn Beaumont
7.	"The Elegant Captain Hook"	Sammy Cahn	Sammy Fain	Hans Conried, Bill Thompson & The Mellomen
8.	"You Can Fly! (Reprise)"	Sammy Cahn	Sammy Fain	The Jud Conlon Chorus & The Mellomen
9.	"Never Smile at a Crocodile"	Jack Lawrence	Frank Churchill

=== Music releases ===
- The 1997 soundtrack release contains the bonus tracks "Never Smile at a Crocodile" (with lyrics) and an early demo recording of "The Boatswain's Song".

== Release ==
=== Original theatrical run ===
Peter Pan premiered at Radio City Music Hall in New York City on February 5, 1953, and was simultaneously released in theaters as a double feature with the True-Life Adventures documentary short, Bear Country (1953). To promote the film, a television special The Walt Disney Christmas Show was aired on CBS on December 25, 1951, with Bobby Driscoll and Kathryn Beaumont reprising their roles of Peter Pan and Wendy as live-action characters. A promotional behind-the-scenes featurette The Peter Pan Story was released the following year.

During its initial theatrical run, Peter Pan grossed $6 million in distributor rentals from the United States and Canada and $2.6 million internationally.

=== Re-releases ===
Peter Pan was re-released theatrically in 1958, 1969, 1976, 1982 and 1989. The film also had a special limited re-release at the Philadelphia Film Festival in 2003. It also played a limited engagement in select Cinemark Theatres from February 16–18, 2013. To celebrate Disney's 100th anniversary, Peter Pan was re-released in theaters across the UK on September 1, 2023, for a week. The movie has earned a lifetime domestic gross of $87.4 million. Adjusted for inflation, and incorporating subsequent releases, the film has had a lifetime gross of $427.5 million.

=== Home media ===
Peter Pan was first released on North American VHS, LaserDisc and Betamax in 1990 and UK VHS in 1993. A THX certified 45th anniversary limited edition of the film was released on March 3, 1998, as part of the Walt Disney Masterpiece Collection. Peter Pan was released on DVD on November 23, 1999 as a part of the Walt Disney Limited Issues series for a limited 60-day time period before going into moratorium. Peter Pan was re-released as a special-edition VHS and DVD release in 2002 to promote the sequel Return to Never Land. The DVD was accompanied with special features including a making-of documentary, a sing-along, a storybook and a still-frame gallery of production artwork.

On March 6, 2007, a Platinum Edition of Peter Pan was released as a two-disc DVD, containing a new digital restoration of the film. Peter Pan was re-released on Diamond Edition Blu-ray on February 5, 2013 to celebrate its 60th anniversary. A DVD and digital copy were also released on August 20, 2013. Peter Pan was re-released in digital HD format on May 29, 2018 and on Blu-ray on June 5, 2018, as part of the Walt Disney Signature Collection line, to celebrate the film's 65th anniversary. A 70th anniversary edition Blu-ray released in 2023 as a Disney Movie Club exclusive.

== Reception ==
=== Critical reaction ===
Peter Pan received generally positive reviews from critics upon release, some of whom praised the animation but felt it veered too far from the play. Bosley Crowther of The New York Times criticized the film's lack of faithfulness to the original play, claiming it "has the story but not the spirit of Peter Pan as it was plainly conceived by its author and is usually played on the stage". Nevertheless, he praised the colors are "more exciting and the technical features of the job, such as the synchronization of voices with the animation of lips, are very good". However, Time magazine gave the film a highly favorable review, writing "it is a lively feature-length Technicolor excursion into a world that glows with an exhilarating charm and a gentle joyousness." The Chicago Tribune wrote: "The backgrounds are delightfully picturesque, the music only so-so. The film is designed for broad effect, with the accent of comedy. I'm sure the youngsters who grow up with cartoons will be right at home with all the characters." Variety described the film as a "feature cartoon of enchanting quality. The music score is fine, highlighting the constant buzz of action and comedy, but the songs are less impressive than usually encountered in such a Disney presentation." Harrison's Reports felt the film was "another Walt Disney masterpiece. It should prove a delight, not only to children, but also to every adult. The animation is so good that the characters appear almost natural."

Giving the film 3 1/2 stars out of 4, Gene Siskel of the Chicago Tribune noted the "drawing of Tinkerbelle [sic] and the flamboyance of Captain Hook" as well as the "quality music mixed with appropriate animation" were the film's major highlights. Michael Jackson cited Peter Pan as his favorite film, and from it he derived the name of his estate, Neverland Ranch, in Santa Barbara, California, where he had a private amusement park. Ronald D. Moore, one of the executive producers of the re-imagined Battlestar Galactica, has cited this film as the inspiration for the series' theme of the cyclical nature of time, using the film's opening line, "All of this has happened before and it will all happen again", as a key tenet of the culture's scripture. On the review aggregator website Rotten Tomatoes, 79% of 42 critics' reviews are positive, with an average rating of 7/10. The website's consensus reads: "Though it doesn't delve deeply into the darkness of J. M. Barrie's tale, Peter Pan is a heartwarming, exuberant film with some great tunes."

=== Controversy ===
Peter Pan has been criticized since at least the 1990s for its broadly stereotypical treatment of Native Americans.

In 1995, Eric Goldberg, director of that year's Disney animated romance Pocahontas, expressed his belief that "all the Indians [in the 1953 film] were caricatures".

In particular, the song "What Made the Red Man Red?" has been removed from television airings of the film and widely described as "racist" since 2014. Its lyrics claim that Native American men are "red" due to "the very first Injun prince" blushing after kissing a "maid". It also contains usage of the word "squaw", gibberish utterances, and a mocking explanation of the Lakota greeting háu. The visuals include tipis, drumming, tobbacco ceremonial pipes, and the Inuit eskimo kiss. The song "Following the Leader" has also been criticized for the lyric "We're off to fight the injuns".

The Native American tribe was not included in the 2002 sequel Return to Never Land, but they were included in a tie-in video game and are referenced by a brief shot of Peter Pan flying by a totem pole.

Animator Marc Davis was quoted in the 2007 audio commentary: "I'm not sure we would have done the Indians if we were making this movie now. And if we had, we wouldn't do them the way we did back then."

In 2021, the film was one of several that Disney limited to viewers 7 years and older on their streaming service Disney+. They cited the film's depictions of Native American characters that were "stereotypical" and not "authentic", and references to them as "redskins".

== Legacy ==
=== Disney Fairies ===
Disney Fairies is a series of children's books published by Random House, which features Tinker Bell and her friends. It also has a film series starting in 2008 with the self-titled film about Tinker Bell.

=== Theme parks ===
Cast member as Peter Pan in Disneyland Paris

Peter Pan's Flight is a popular ride found at Disneyland, Walt Disney World, Tokyo Disneyland, Disneyland Paris, and Shanghai Disneyland. Peter Pan, Wendy, Captain Hook and Mr. Smee make appearances in the parades, as well as greetings throughout the theme parks.

Peter Pan, Wendy, Captain Hook, Mr. Smee, and the Pirates were featured in a scene during Disneyland's original version of Fantasmic! from 1992 to 2016.

=== Ice shows ===
- Disney on Ice began its touring production of Peter Pan in Fall 1989. The production went on to tour nationally & internationally, from 1989 to 1993. The production featured a pre-recorded soundtrack with all the film's songs and character voices.
- A shortened version of the story is presented in the current Disney on Ice production Mickey & Minnie's Amazing Journey. The show began in Fall 2003 & is currently on tour nationally. It features the songs "You Can Fly!", "Following the Leader", "Your Mother and Mine", "A Pirate's Life", "The Elegant Captain Hook" & "The Second Star to the Right".

=== Video games ===
Peter Pan: Adventures in Never Land is an adventure game in which Peter Pan and Tinker Bell are after a hidden treasure, before Captain Hook reach the treasure first.

Neverland is a playable world in both Kingdom Hearts and Kingdom Hearts: Chain of Memories, with Tinker Bell appearing as a summon. Both Peter Pan and Tinker Bell appear as a summon in the sequel, Kingdom Hearts II. Neverland also appears as a playable world in Kingdom Hearts 358/2 Days and returns as a playable world in Kingdom Hearts Birth by Sleep.

Peter Pan, Tinker Bell, Wendy, John, Michael and Captain Hook are playable characters in Disney Magic Kingdoms, being unlocked during the progress of the main storyline of the game.

=== Board game ===
Walt Disney's Peter Pan: A Game of Adventure (1953) is a Transogram Company Inc. track board game based upon the film. The game was one of many toys that exploited the popularity of Walt Disney's post–World War II movies. The object of the game is to be the first player to travel from the Darlings' house to Neverland and back to the Darlings' house.

Play begins at the Darlings' house in the upper left hand corner of the game board. Each player moves, in turn, the number of spaces along the track indicated by his spin of the dial. When a player reaches the Never Isle, he selects a character from the film (Peter, Wendy, Michael, or John) and receives the instruction card for that character. The player follows his chosen character's track on the board, obeying instructions upon the character's card. The player is also obligated to follow any instructions on those spaces he lands upon after spinning the dial during the course of his turn at play. The first player who travels from Never Land to Skull Rock and along the Stardust Trail to Captain Hook's ship, and returns to the Darlings' house is declared the winner.

The board game makes an appearance in the 1968 version of Yours, Mine and Ours as a Christmas present.

=== Musical ===
Disney's Peter Pan Jr is a one-hour children's musical based on the Disney Peter Pan movie with some updated material. It became available for school and children's theatre productions in 2013 after several pilot productions.

=== Sequels ===
This was Disney's first Peter Pan film. In the early 2000s, a Peter Pan franchise was spawned, involving a number of other animated releases. The franchise also included:

- Return to Never Land: Released theatrically in 2002, and a direct-sequel to Peter Pan.
- The Tinker Bell film series: A spin-off and prequel to the Peter Pan films. Disneytoon Studios produced a number of Tinker Bell films, including six feature-length straight-to-home video films, and two shorts.
- The television series Jake and the Never Land Pirates includes Hook and Smee as main characters, and is set in Never Land, some time after the events of Peter Pan. Tick-Tock the Crocodile appears as a recurring character in the series. Peter, Tinker Bell, Wendy, Michael and John also appear as guest characters.

=== Live-action adaptation ===
In April 2016, following the individual financial and critical successes of Maleficent, Cinderella, and The Jungle Book, a number of live-action adaptations of Walt Disney Pictures' classic animated films were announced to be in development. The Walt Disney Company announced that a live action Peter Pan film was in development, with David Lowery serving as director, with a script he co-wrote with Toby Halbrooks. In July 2018, it was reported that the feature length film would be released exclusively on the company's streaming service, Disney+. It has since been said that the film may instead get a theatrical release.

In January 2020, casting was underway while the film was retitled Peter Pan and Wendy. Joe Roth and Jim Whitaker will serve as producers. Principal photography was scheduled to commence on April 17, 2020, in Canada and in London, United Kingdom. By March, Alexander Molony and Ever Anderson were cast as Peter Pan and Wendy, respectively. Later that month however, filming on all Disney projects were halted due to the COVID-19 pandemic and industry restrictions worldwide. In July 2020, Jude Law entered early negotiations to portray Captain Hook, and was officially cast two months later. Joaquin Phoenix, Adam Driver, and Will Smith were all previously on the short-list of actors being considered for the role, though each of them ultimately passed on the opportunity. In September 2020, Yara Shahidi was cast as Tinker Bell. In October 2020, Alyssa Wapanatâhk was cast in the role of Tiger Lily. In January 2021, Jim Gaffigan joined the film's cast as Mr. Smee. On March 16, 2021, the same day that principal photography officially began, Alan Tudyk, Molly Parker, Joshua Pickering, and Jacobi Jupe were announced to play Mr. Darling, Mrs. Darling, John Darling, and Michael Darling, respectively.

In December 2020, it was announced that the film would be debuting on Disney+. Filming began on March 16, 2021, in Vancouver, Canada, and was expected to wrap on June 30, 2021. Additional filming took place on the Bonavista Peninsula of Newfoundland and Labrador, in August 2021. Peter Pan & Wendy was released on Disney+ on April 28, 2023.

==== 70th Anniversary ====
Various products were released, themed after the 70th anniversary, in 2023. Products include a mug, a pin, and POP! figures. In addition, a 70th anniversary edition Blu-ray released as a Disney Movie Club exclusive. The Blu-ray includes a restored version of the film and a bonus disc containing the featurette "In Walt's Words: Peter Pan".

== See also ==
- Lists of animated films
- Second weekend in box office performance § Second-weekend increase
