= Mic Jordan =

American rapper

- Born: Belcourt, North Dakota, United States
- Citizenship: Turtle Mountain Band of Chippewa Indians
- Years active: 2014–present
- Musical career
- Genres: Hip hop
- Instrument: Vocals
- Website: http://micjordanmusic.com/

Mic Jordan, is an Ojibwe rapper and activist from the Turtle Mountain Band of Chippewa Indians. Born in Belcourt, North Dakota, Jordan attended Minnesota State University, Moorhead, where he studied graphic communications. Crediting hip-hop with playing a substantial role in his development, he began playing local shows in both Minnesota and North Dakota. In 2013 he contributed the song #DearNativeYouth to the Last Stand Mixtape, Vol. 1 album. His first solo album, Sometime in 83, was funded through Kickstarter and released on October 16, 2014. Revolutions per Minute identified one single from the album, Modern Day Warrior, as one of the "15 Best Indigenous Music Videos of 2014", while Paper Magazine identified Jordan as one of "Seven Rising Native American Musicians to Listen For".
