= Clarence Edmund Bennett =

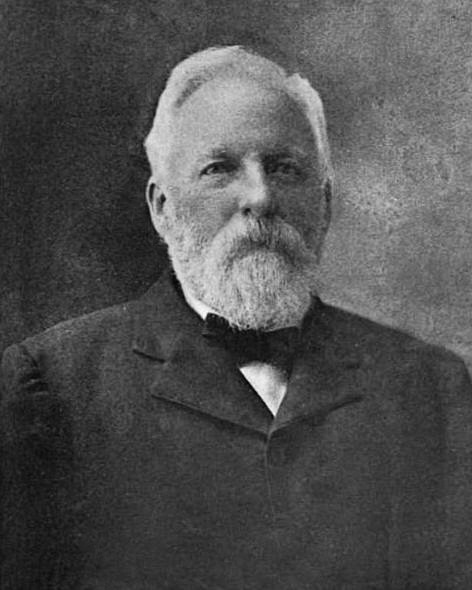
- Clarence Bennett
- Born: 22 December 1833; New York, US
- Died: 4 November 1902 (aged 69); Fort McPherson, Georgia, US
- Burial place: Arlington National Cemetery
- Military career
- Allegiance: (United States) United States; Union
- Branch: United States Army; Union Army
- Service years: 1855–1860, 1863–1897
- Rank: Lieutenant colonel Brevet Colonel
- Units: U.S. 10th Infantry Regiment; 1st Regiment California Volunteer Cavalry; 6th Cavalry Regiment; U.S. 17th Infantry Regiment; U.S. 19th Infantry Regiment; U.S. 11th Infantry Regiment
- Wars: Utah Expedition; American Civil War; Indian Wars
- Other work: Farmer

American Army officer Clarence Edmund Bennett (22 December 1833 – 4 November 1902) served in the American Civil War in California, New Mexico and Arizona Territories, and later in Reconstruction occupation forces and frontier duty during the later Indian Wars. He saw duty almost exclusively in Western frontier assignments.

== Early life and army service ==
Born in New York, Clarence E. Bennett graduated from West Point and was promoted to Brevet 2nd Lieutenant of Infantry on 1 July 1855. He served in garrison at Carlisle Barracks, and later on the frontier as a second lieutenant with the U.S. 10th Infantry Regiment on 16 August 1855. He served at Fort Ripley, Minnesota, from 1855 to 1857. He was part of the Utah Expedition from 1857 to 1860, serving as regimental adjutant, of 10th Infantry from 1 October 1858 to 16 July 1860, and served at Fort Laramie, Dakota Territory in 1860.

He resigned his commission on 10 September 1860, and moved to San Bernardino, California to be a farmer until 1863. He married Sciota/Siotha Whitlock (born in 1835 in Missouri) in San Bernardino about 1861. She was the daughter of Harvey Gilman Whitlock and Minerva Abbott, who had been two of the earliest Mormon converts in 1830.

Their four children were: William Clarence Bennett, Irvine Edmund Bennett, Ida Minerva Bennett, and Daisy Whitlock Bennett.

== Civil War service ==
During the secession crisis prior to Civil War and following Fort Sumter, Bennett was active in informing Union officials of the activities of the secessionists in San Bernardino County that led to Federal troops occupying Camp San Bernardino within the town and later at Camp Carleton nearby. He was elected as captain of the local California Militia Company the San Bernardino Mounted Rifles on 10 October 1861, and was commissioned 26 October 1861. With the Rifles, he aided the civil authorities in suppressing Rebellion in the county. On 1 April 1862, Captain Bennett tendered his resignation from the militia to Governor Leland Stanford, wishing to be absent from the county for a few months.

Bennett later enlisted in the 1st Regiment California Volunteer Cavalry in San Francisco on 9 February 1863, serving as a major, stationed first in Southern California commanding at Drum Barracks with the task of organizing new companies of First California Cavalry Volunteers from 9 February to 4 June 1863. He was on frontier duty at Camp Morris in San Bernardino, defending against the threat of secessionists to Union men in the town from June to August 1863. From 15 August 1863 to 17 April 1864, he commanded the garrison at Fort Yuma and was promoted lieutenant colonel of the 1st California Cavalry Volunteers, 31 December 1863.

From May to December 1864, he commanded Fort Craig, New Mexico Territory, then from January to February 1865 he commanded Fort Bowie, Arizona Territory. From February to June 1865, he was given command of District of Arizona, headquartered at Tubac. On 13 March 1865, Bennett was promoted brevet colonel, U. S. Volunteers, For Faithful And Meritorious Services During The Rebellion. He remained active scouting, making roads, and establishing Camp McDowell, from June 1865 to August 1866. He was mustered out of the Volunteer Service on 15 August 1866.

== Later army service ==
From 23 February 1866. Bennett had been re-appointed to the United States Army, with the rank of second lieutenant, 6th Cavalry Regiment and was promoted first lieutenant, 6th Cavalry, 28 July 1866. He served on quartermaster and commissary duty at Camp McDowell, from December 1866 to March 1867 and was promoted captain, US 17th Infantry Regiment on 22 January 1867.

After a leave of absence from March to December 1867, Captain Bennett joined the regimental garrison at Galveston, Texas on 8 December 1867, remaining there on Reconstruction duty until March 1868. He served on a court martial at San Antonio, Texas, 13 March to 26 June 1868. He was then appointed acting assistant inspector-general, District of Texas, from 1 July to 10 August 1868, then for the Fifth Military District, 10 August 1868, to 10 April 1869. He was on registering duty in the First Military District to June, 1869, then the regiment was sent to Virginia for reconstruction duty. He was in garrison at Winchester, Virginia, 1 June 1869 to February 1870 and then, due to troubles in the state of North Carolina, his company was sent to Raleigh, North Carolina, February 1870 to April 1870.

Due to increasing trouble with the Sioux, the regiment was ordered to Dakota Territory, and arrived at Fort Sully in mid May, and commenced a long tour of service which lasted over sixteen years. Captain Bennett served on frontier duty, at Fort Sully, from April 1870, then at Post at Grand River Indian Agency from May 1870 to June 1872. In June 1872, he traveled to Fort Rice and participated in the Yellowstone Expedition of 1872 under Colonel David S. Stanley from July to September 1872. Subsequently, he was in garrisons at Fort Rice October 1873, then at Fort Abercrombie, to August 1876, and at Post at Standing Rock Indian Agency, August 1876 to November 1876. He was a member of the prison board, 16 December 1876, to 24 January 1877, then on a leave of absence, to 31 March 1877.

He returned to frontier duty at Post at Standing Rock Indian Agency from 25 April to December 1877, then was at Fort Snelling, Minnesota, December 1877 to 10 October 1878, and at Fort Sisseton, Dakota, 16 October to 18 December 1878. He was on detached service, 18 December 1878, to 27 February 1879.

Again on frontier duty at Fort Sisseton, Dakota, from February 1879 to 16 May 1884. He was then at Fort Totten, Dakota, from May 1884 to 13 July 1886, (leave of absence, 11 January to 31 March 1885). Finally he served at Fort D. A. Russell, Wyoming, from July, 1886.

Bennett was promoted major, U.S. 19th Infantry Regiment, 28 November 1893. He was promoted lieutenant colonel, U.S. 11th Infantry Regiment, 27 June 1897. Bennett retired as a lieutenant colonel on 2 December 1897.

He died on 4 November 1902, of apoplexy and was buried at Arlington National Cemetery, in Arlington, Virginia.
