= Potato Creek Johnny =

American frontiersman

- Born: John Eli Perrett; February 9, 1866 or 1868; Abergavenny, Wales
- Died: February 26, 1943; Deadwood, South Dakota, U.S.
- Resting place: Mount Moriah Cemetery, Deadwood
- Occupation: Gold miner
- Known for: Discovery of one of the largest gold nuggets in the Black Hills

John Eli Perrett (February 9, 1866 or 1868 – February 26, 1943), better known as Potato Creek Johnny, (Note: Some sources spell his surname Perrott or Perrault, or spell his nickname "Potato Creek Johnnie".) was an American frontiersman and gold miner, best known for having discovered one of the largest gold nuggets ever discovered in the Black Hills in 1929. From then until the end of his life, Potato Creek Johnny became a local celebrity and promoted tourism to the Black Hills.

== Early life ==
John Eli Perrett was born in Abergavenny, Wales. Accounts disagree whether the year of his birth was 1866 or 1868, but his birthday was reported as February 9. His family immigrated to the United States in 1883, seeking fortune in the Black Hills gold rush. The Perrett family arrived in New York City, took a train to Sidney, Nebraska, and then joined a stagecoach to Central City, South Dakota.

Although he initially worked various jobs in the area, including as a wrangler at Dorsett Ranch, he started panning for gold with other prospectors in streams and rivers. He settled a claim on Potato Creek, a tributary of Spearfish Creek, from which he gained his nickname. Potato Creek Johnny later began working in the pumphouse of the local tin mine but became unemployed after the mine closed in January 1929; following this, he resumed prospecting in Potato Creek.

== Gold nugget ==
While panning on May 27, 1929, Potato Creek Johnny uncovered a 7.346 ozt (228.5 g) gold nugget, one of the largest ever discovered in the Black Hills. In 1934, local businessman W.E. Adams bought the nugget from Johnny for $250 ($6,017 in 2025) and put it on display in the Adams Museum. The same year, the original nugget was moved to a safe deposit box over theft concerns and a replica was put on display in its place. In 2014, a secure case was installed in the museum so the original could be placed on permanent display.

The authenticity of Potato Creek Johnny's gold nugget has been the subject of debate. Several local residents suspected that Johnny had created the nugget by melting down smaller quantities of gold into one piece; some accused him of having stolen the gold to do so. Analysis of the nugget by various gold experts have determined the nugget is likely to be authentic, due to the presence of natural quartz crystals inside.

Despite the controversy, Johnny's find made him a local folk hero. He grew out his hair and beard and dressed in old clothing, leaning into the stereotypical appearance of a 19th-century placer miner. He participated in tourism efforts, being made an ambassador by the Deadwood Chamber of Commerce, and became a feature of Deadwood's Days of '76 celebrations in subsequent years. In 1939, he was pictured in Life magazine.

== Personal life ==
On March 13, 1907, Johnny married Molly Hamilton of Belle Fourche, South Dakota. They had no children and divorced in September 1928.

Johnny was 4'3" tall.

== Death and legacy ==
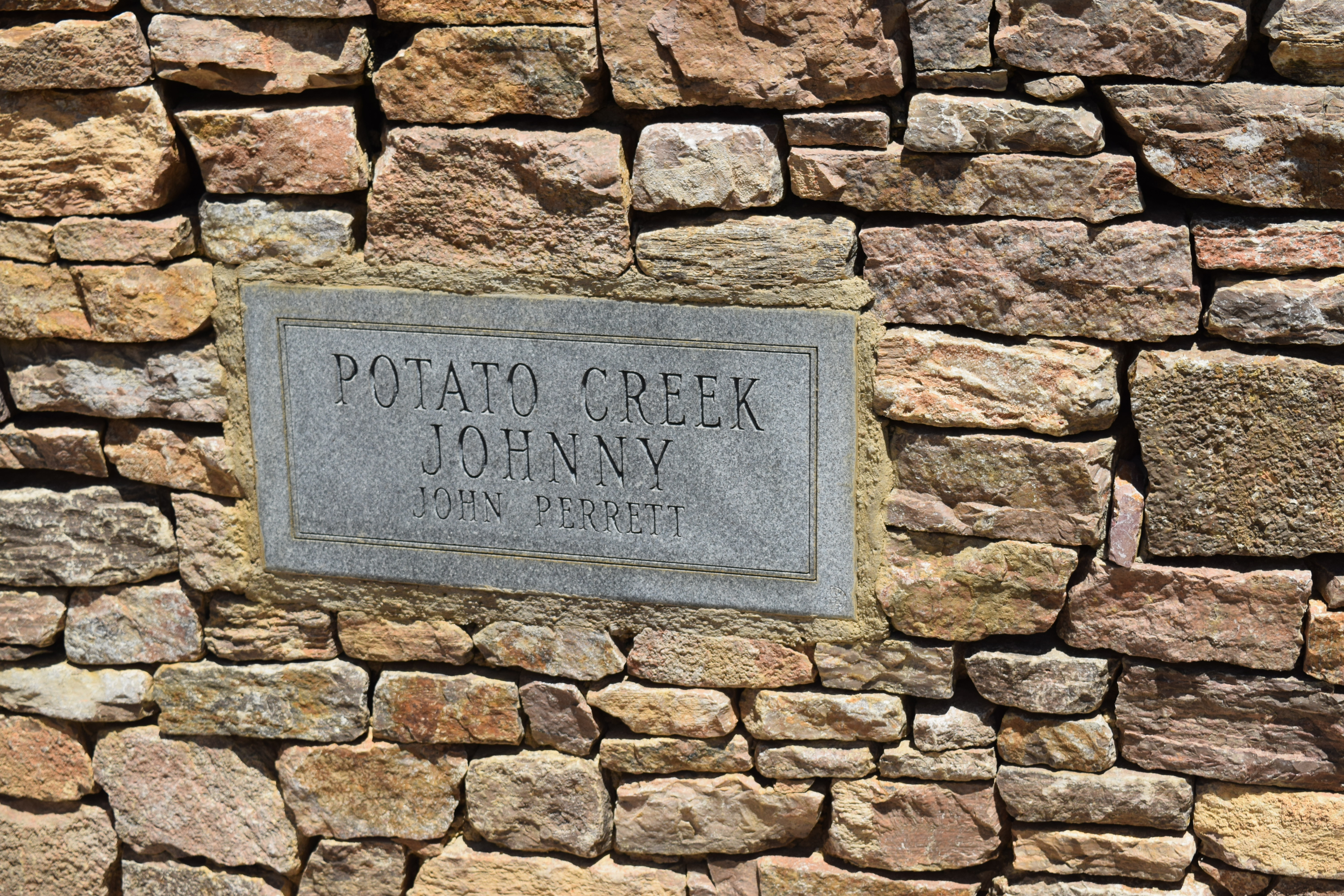
Potato Creek Johnny's grave marker in Mount Moriah Cemetery

Potato Creek Johnny died on February 26, 1943, at the age of about 77, after a two-week illness. His funeral procession on March 3 passed by the Adams Museum, and a bell tolled 77 years, once for each year of his life. He is buried next to Wild Bill Hickok and Calamity Jane in Mount Moriah Cemetery in Deadwood.
