= Annie Tallent =

American pioneer and writer (1827–1901)

Annie Donna Tallent (née Fraser; April 14, 1827 – February 13, 1901) was an American pioneer, author, and educator in the Midwest in the late 19th century. She is considered to have been the first white woman in the Black Hills, arriving in 1874 during the Black Hills gold rush. She was posthumously inducted into the South Dakota Hall of Fame in 1978.

== Early life ==
Annie Donna Fraser was born on April 14, 1827, in York, New York, to Donald G. and Margaret Ferguson Fraser and was educated at the Genesee Wesleyan Seminary in Lima, New York. She married lawyer David G. Tallent of Corning on July 4, 1854, and with him had one son, Robert.

== South Dakota pioneer ==
When gold was discovered in the Black Hills in 1874, Annie, David, and Robert Tallent left New York State for the frontier. Annie was the only woman in the Gordon Party, a gold-prospecting journey that covered over 400 miles (640 km) from Sioux City, Iowa, to near present-day Custer, South Dakota. She was the first white woman to enter the sacred grounds of the Lakota people on this expedition, which was undertaken in defiance of the U.S. government's Laramie Treaty with the Sioux Nation. The party established a stronghold on the banks of Stockade Lake near Custer called the Gordon Stockade. The group was dispersed by the United States Cavalry on April 4, 1875, and the Tallents moved to Cheyenne, Wyoming.

Tallent, like other pioneers, cited "manifest destiny", claiming that expansion into the area promoted economic growth and the advancement of civilization. The Tallents moved back into Dakota Territory after the Battle of the Little Bighorn. Mr. Tallent deserted his family during the 1880s, but Annie spent the rest of her life there, achieving success as a single mother, teacher, and educator. In 1887, Tallent and her son moved to Rapid City. She served as superintendent of Pennington County schools from 1891 to 1895 and also served on the Rapid City Board of Education for three years, two as president.

In June 1897, Tallent moved to Sturgis to live with her son. In 1899, she authored the book The Black Hills; or, the Last Hunting Ground of the Dakotahs, a comprehensive history of the region. The book outlined her strong belief that "such treaties as tend to arrest the advance of civilization and retard the development of the rich resources of our country should not have been entered into."

Tallent died on February 13, 1901. She was buried in Elgin, Illinois.

== Legacy ==
In 1924, a granite monument to Tallent commemorating her arrival was erected at the site of the Gordon Stockade.

Tallent was inducted into the South Dakota Hall of Fame in 1978.
