= List of forts in South Dakota =

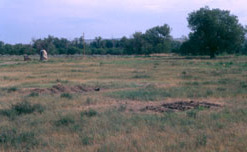
The site of Fort Pierre Chouteau, a National Historic Landmark

The following is a list of forts in South Dakota.

== Forts in South Dakota ==
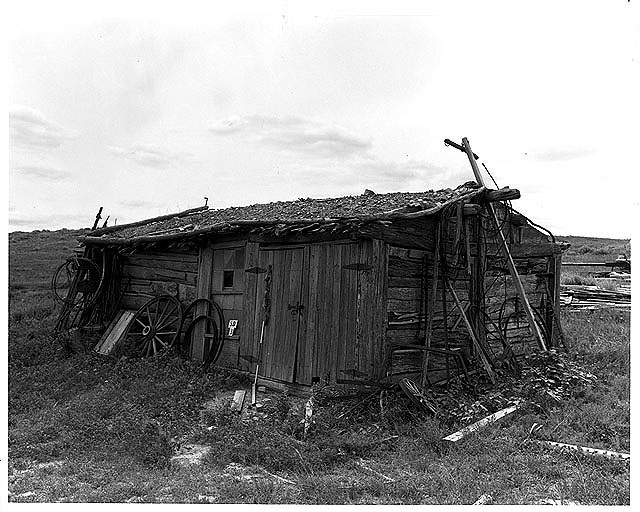
The blacksmith shop at Fort Bennett

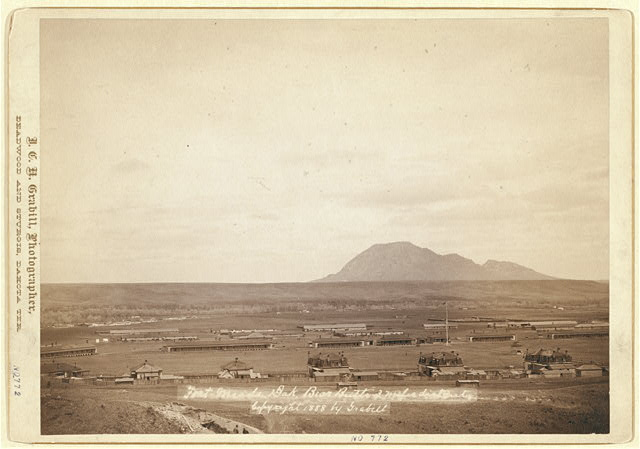
Fort Meade in 1888

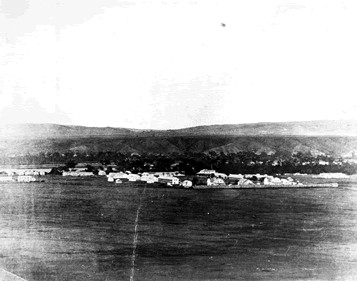
Fort Randall

Name	County	Built	Notes
Fort Bennett	Stanley	1870	Originally called the Post at Cheyenne (River) Indian Agency until 1878.
Camp Bradley	Roberts	1863	
Fort Brule	Union	1862	Dismantled in 1873.
Fort Buckingham	Custer	1890	
Camp Burt		1875	
Fort Cedar	Sully	1856	
Camp Cheyenne	Meade	1890	Built in response to the Sioux Ghost Dance Uprising.
Camp Collins	Lawrence	1875	
Camp Cook		1863	
Camp Crook	Custer	1876	This Camp Crook was located in Custer.
Camp Crook	Custer	1876	This Camp Crook was located near Pringle.
Camp Crook	Lawrence	1876	
Camp Crook	Pennington	1876	Later evolved into the town of Pactola.
Fort Dakota	Minnehaha	1865	
Fort Defiance	Custer	1874	Also known as Gordon Stockade, Union Stockade, and Camp Harney.
Fort Dole	Charles Mix	1862	
Camp Edwards	Brookings	1857	
Camp George Dewey	Minnehaha	1898	
Post at Grand River Indian Agency	Corson	1870	
Fort Hale	Lyman	1870	Also called Post at Lower Brulé Indian Agency or Fort Lower Brule.
Fort Hutchinson	Yankton		
Fort James		1865	Also known as Fort la Roche or Fort des Roche.
Camp Jennison	Roberts	1863	
Fort Lookout	Brule	1856	
Camp Marshall	Grant	1863	
Fort Meade	Meade	1878	Known in its early days as Camp Ruhlen and Camp Sturgis.
New Fort Pierre	Stanley	1859	
Fort Pierre Chouteau	Stanley	1831	
Camp Rains	Shannon	1874	
Fort Randall	Gregory	1856	
Camp Rapid	Pennington	1925	
Rapid City Blockhouse	Pennington	1876	
Red Canyon Station	Fall River	1876	Also known as Camp Collier, Camp Jennings, Military Station, and Camp Red Canyon.
Camp Reynolds	Meade	1859	
Post at Rosebud Indian Agency		1878	
Fort Sisseton	Marshall	1864	
Camp Stanton	Custer	1890	
Camp Success	Custer	1875	
Fort Sully	Hughes	1863	Also known as Fort Bartlett.
Fort Sully	Sully	1866	
Camp Terry	Meade	1875	Set up by the Newton–Jenney Party.
Fort Thompson	Buffalo	1864	
Camp Turtle	Pennington	1875	Used by the Newton–Jenney Party.
Camp Warren	Pennington	1857	
Post at Whetstone Indian Agency	Gregory	1870	
Fort Yankton	Yankton	1862	

== See also ==
- List of ghost towns in South Dakota
