= Gordon Stockade =

- Custer State Park; Near Custer, South Dakota

Site information
- Type: Stockade
- Open to the public: Yes
- Condition: Reconstructed

Location
- Coordinates: 43°46′11.3″N 103°31′50.6″W

Site history
- Built: December 23, 1874
- In use: 1874–20th century
- Materials: Wood
- Battles/wars: Great Sioux War of 1876
- Events: Black Hills gold rush

Gordon Stockade, originally called Fort Defiance, was a stockade fortification on French Creek in the Black Hills, located today off of U.S. 16 near Custer, South Dakota, United States. It was erected in December 1874 by the Gordon Party, an expedition of white settlers who travelled to the Black Hills at the beginning of the gold rush, on the site of a previous encampment by George Armstrong Custer's Black Hills Expedition. The party's settlement of the area was illegal under the 1868 Treaty of Fort Laramie and the group was removed by the United States Army in April 1875, who subsequently began using the Gordon Stockade as a base. Now part of Custer State Park, the fort was recreated in its current form in 2004 and is open to the public.

== History ==
=== Custer and Gordon Party expeditions ===
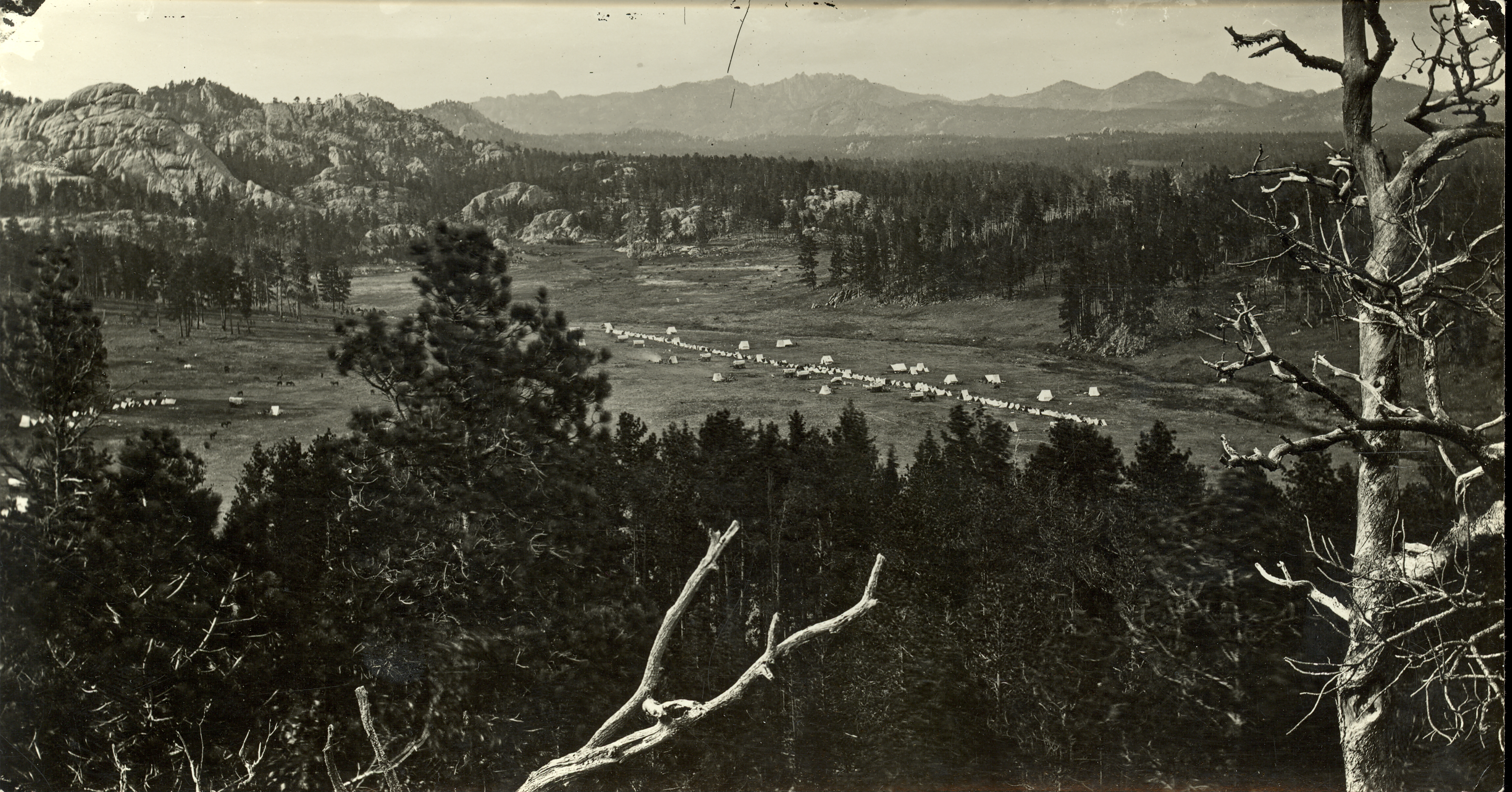
Custer's camp on French Creek, which would become Gordon Stockade a few months later

Members of the 1874 Black Hills Expedition led by George Armstrong Custer first reported the discovery of gold in the Black Hills. In particular, gold deposits were reported in French Creek, which flows through present-day Custer, South Dakota. The Custer Expedition stayed at the camp for five days, the longest stop on their route, and the camp continued to serve as a base for the remainder of the expedition.

Although only trace amounts of gold had been discovered, word quickly spread as newspapers sensationalized the reports, attracting civilians to the area in search of wealth. One such newspaper was the Sioux City Weekly Times in Sioux City, Iowa. The paper's editor, Charles Collins, began to organize a party to explore the gold claims. He partnered with Thomas H. Russell, a miner who had previously led successful expeditions into the Colorado and Montana Territories. Their intent was to locate more gold and encourage the U.S. government to break its 1868 Treaty of Fort Laramie with local Native American tribes, which forbade white settlement of the Black Hills.

Originally called the Collins-Russell Party, the group later changed its name to the Gordon Party after its guide, John Gordon. Gordon was selected for his knowledge of the area, as he had previously worked running freight between Spotted Tail Agency and the Missouri River. In total, the expedition consisted of 26 men, one woman, and one 10-year-old child. One-third of the party consisted of experienced miners, and another third were lumberjacks from Wisconsin, who would be tasked with building shelter for the group.

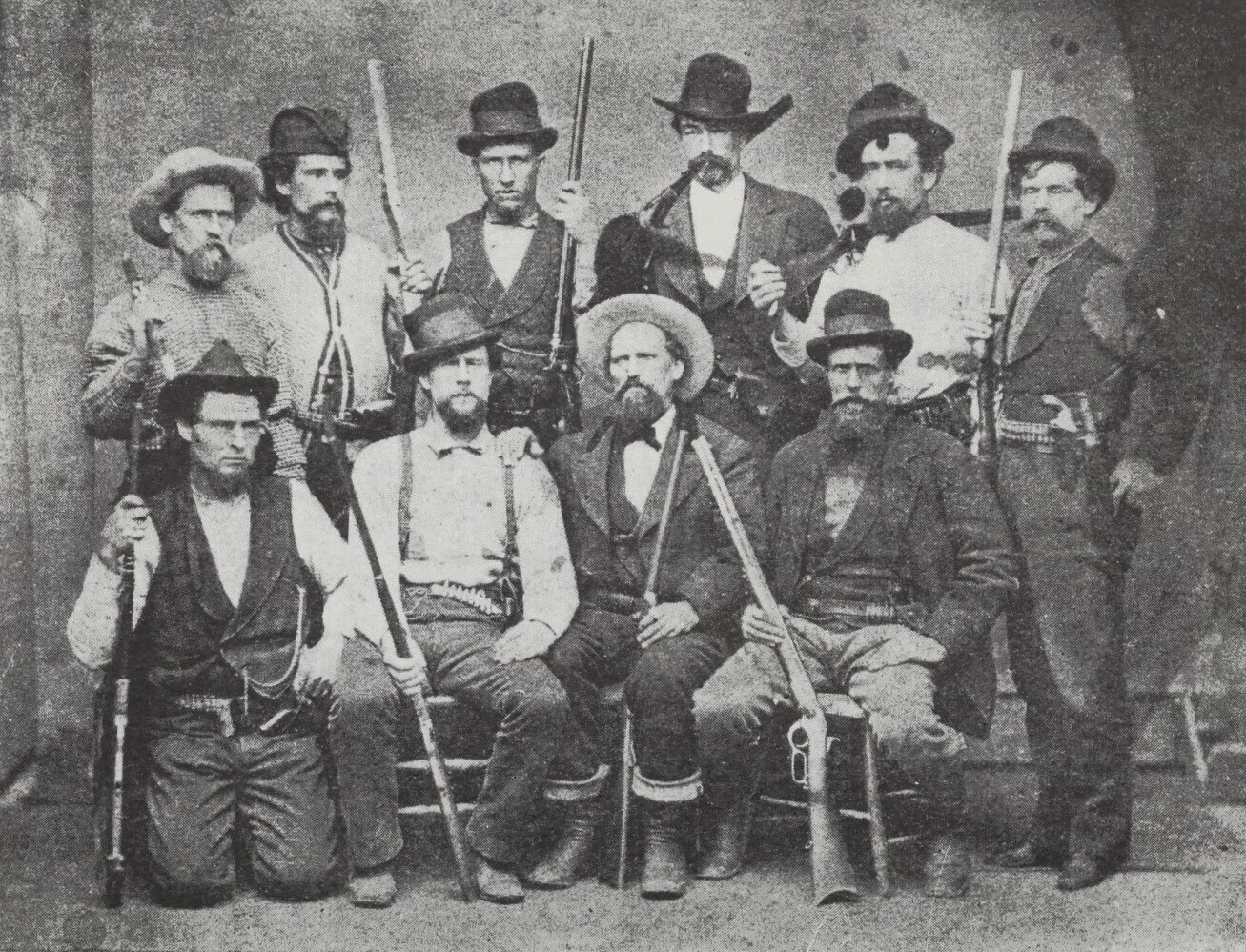
Members of the Gordon Party. Left to right, top to bottom: Quiner, Aken, Angus McDonald, Lamb, Dan McDonald, Boyle, Dempster, Black Dan McDonald, Whitney, Logan.

The names and origins of those on the expedition were recorded as:

- Moses Aarons of San Francisco, California (Note: Aarons died of dysentery on November 27 or 28 near the party's crossing of the Bad River before the expedition reached the Black Hills.)
- David Aken of Richland Center, Wisconsin
- Russell H. Bishop of Flint, Michigan
- Charles Blackwell of St. Louis, Missouri
- J. F. Boyle of Richland Center, Wisconsin
- J. W. Brockett of Wichita, Kansas (Note: Shortly after departure, Brockett became ill and returned to Sioux City.)
- George Harry Cooper of Danville, Illinois
- Charles Cordeiro of Wichita, Kansas
- James Dempster of Eau Claire, Wisconsin
- John Gordon of Sioux City, Iowa
- Lyman Lamb of Eau Claire, Wisconsin
- B. B. Logan of Eau Claire, Wisconsin
- A. F. Long of Adel, Iowa
- Thomas McLaren of St. Louis, Missouri
- Angus McDonald of Eau Claire, Wisconsin
- Dan "Red Dan" McDonald of Chippewa Falls, Wisconsin
- D. W. "Black Dan" McDonald of Eau Claire, Wisconsin
- James Power of Eau Claire, Wisconsin
- Thomas Quiner of Rome, Wisconsin
- Thomas H. Russell of Sioux City, Iowa
- David G.; his wife, Annie D.; and their son, Robert E. "Bird" Tallent, of Sioux City, Iowa
- H. Thomas of St. Louis, Missouri
- J. Newton Warren of Wichita, Kansas
- J. J. Williams of Winfield, Kansas
- Ephraim Witcher of Sioux City, Iowa
- R. R. Whitney of Sioux City, Iowa

The group departed from Sioux City on October 6, 1874, and journeyed westward in six wagons. Upon one of these wagons was inscribed the name "O'Neill's Colony", meant to mask their true destination as a settlement in Nebraska, so as not to raise suspicion from the U.S. Army, who were patrolling the hills and its environs to deter settlers from entering illegally. The party first arrived in Norfolk, Nebraska, then followed the Niobrara River before crossing into Dakota Territory and the Badlands. Just south of present-day Sturgis, South Dakota, on December 8, the party located the Custer Expedition's trail and followed it southwest. They successfully avoided the army patrols and entered the Black Hills, becoming the first of several such civilian expeditions to do so.

=== Gordon Stockade ===
On December 23, the Gordon Party reached the location of Custer's old base camp on French Creek and set up their own just to the west. In total, the expedition had traveled 635 miles (1,022 km). The lumberjacks were then tasked with erecting a square wooden stockade as protection from the elements and the local Native American tribes. The four palisades, made of logs 1 foot (0.30 m) in thickness, each measured about 80 feet (24 m) long and 10 feet (3.0 m) high. Bastions were erected on each corner. Inside the square, six or seven cabins (Note: Although Annie Tallent later recollected seven cabins, Charles Eli Mix of the U.S. Army counted only six, which was supported by party member Warren's later writings.) were erected as living quarters and a well was dug. By January 16, 1875, the fort was complete, which they called Fort Defiance.

Author Alfred T. Andreas wrote in 1884, "Prospecting was carried on notwithstanding the inclemency of the weather, and satisfactory discoveries were made". The miners found both gold and silver. Initially, the frost was only a few inches thick on the ground, but it had thickened by January and made prospecting more difficult. The returns were promising but hard-won; Whitney wrote in a letter to his wife, "I have set my pile at $150,000 (Note: Equivalent to $4.4 million in 2025.) before I leave the Black Hills. I think it will take that to pay me for what I suffered to get into this country".

By early 1875, the group was suffering from lack of supplies. Several men from the camp, including Gordon and Witcher, traveled to Cheyenne, Wyoming Territory; Sioux City; and Chicago, Illinois, in early 1875 and reported the successes and potential of their mining operations, hoping to recruit more members and entice more settlers to attempt entry into the Black Hills. Over time, some of the settlers left permanently for Sioux City or Fort Laramie, including Blackwell, McLaren, Dan McDonald, Thomas, Warren, and Williams.

As the Gordon Party's findings gained publicity, the U.S. Army took notice of the group, whose presence they had already suspected. The army had previously attempted to locate the camp without success, but with the reports coming from the returning miners, as well as the arrival of Williams and Dan McDonald to Fort Laramie on March 6, the army was able to determine their location. With the onset of milder spring weather, a cavalry unit under Charles Eli Mix was dispatched from Fort Laramie on March 23 to remove the settlers, with Williams Dan McDonald enlisted as their guides.

About April 6, the army arrived and gave the settlers—at that time, only 16 men and Annie and Robert Tallent were present—a few days to pack up before beginning an escort to Fort Laramie around the 9th. (Note: The exact time frame of the arrival of the army and their departure with the miners is debated. Mix provided a date of his troops' discovery of the camp as April 6, while Annie Tallent and Aken both gave that date as April 4. Likewise, the date of abandonment was given by Mix as the 9th but by Tallent as the 6th, and a 1962 bulletin of the South Dakota State Historical Society cited the 10th. Estimates in this article are based on Mix's official reports.) Due to lack of wagons and oxen, many of the mining implements and tools were left behind. The party did not resist removal; historian Watson Parker believed their willingness to leave peacefully was due to their lack of supplies. Annie Tallent later recounted of the troops' arrival at the stockade:

One evening..., four men, unheralded and unbidden, rode boldly right into our stronghold, causing no little consternation and excitement in our usually quiet little community. At first sight they were thought to be the vanguard of our expected reinforcements, but upon a second look it was seen that two of our visitors were in military uniform, while, in the other two we recognized the familiar faces of our quondam comrades, J. J. Williams and Dan McDonald, who, as emissaries of Uncle Sam, had also donned soldier's clothes. The blue coats and brass buttons betrayed their mission.

— Annie Tallent

The group arrived at Fort Laramie on April 18, covering a distance of 421 miles (678 km). Former members of the Gordon Party, including the Tallents, awaited an opportunity to return to the Black Hills. Gordon and Brockett attempted to return to the hills in 1875, but their wagon train was intercepted and burned by the U.S. Army. At the same time as the party's removal, as many as 3,000 other settlers were also in the Black Hills. Many more—many of whom were inspired by the reports from the Gordon Party—were attempting entry, beginning the Black Hills gold rush.

Several months after the removal of the Gordon Party, the Newton–Jenney Party used it as a base. When they arrived, they found the buildings and palisades intact but the interior ransacked and looted.

=== Later history ===
After the removal of the miners, the army itself moved into the fort and began periodically using it as a base for their patrols. Following the 1876 Battle of Slim Buttes, the cavalry led by George Crook began a starvation march that ended until they reached Gordon Stockade and were able to resupply.

As the gold rush progressed and nearby Custer grew, the fort was used as a base of operations and to protect its new settlers from raids by Native Americans. Over time, the fort was abandoned when more gold was discovered near Deadwood to the north.

== Preservation and legacy ==
Over time, the old fort fell into ruin. By the 1920s, very little remained besides remnants of the log posts and some of the cabins' hearth stones. In 1925, the Custer Commercial Club reconstructed the fort, and a dedication ceremony was held on August 20. The creation of Stockade Lake in 1934 rose the water table under the fort, causing damage to its logs. It was again reconstructed in 1941 by the Civilian Conservation Corps. Historical re-enactments and interpretive events were held at the fort over the years.

By 1999, the second replica had again fallen into disrepair. The South Dakota Department of Transportation received a $515,283 grant in 2002 to restore the former fort. In 2004, the old stockade was completely torn down and rebuilt.

Accounts from the Gordon Stockade party were later published. Annie Tallent published her account in her 1899 book The Black Hills; or, The Last Hunting Ground of the Dakotahs, and David Aken published Pioneers of the Black Hills, or the Gordon's Stockade Party of 1874.

Annie Tallent's arrival with the Gordon Party made her the first known white woman to have entered the Black Hills. Tallent became the first schoolteacher in the Black Hills, published a book on the area's history, and served the Rapid City Board of Education. In 1924, a group erected a granite monument in her honor at the Gordon Stockade site.

The South Dakota State Historical Society placed a historical marker at the site of the stockade in 1971.

== Bibliography ==
- Markley, Bill (2011). "Black Hills Expeditions". In Crutchfield, James A.; Moutlon, Candy; Del Bene, Terry (eds.). The Settlement of America. Taylor & Francis. pp. 88–90. ISBN 9781317454618 – via Google Books.
- Parker, Watson (1966). "Chapter 2: Early Expeditions to the Hells". Gold in the Black Hills. South Dakota State Historical Society Press. ISBN 9780985281762.
- Parker, Watson, ed. (1977). "The Report of Captain John Mix of a Scout to the Black Hills, March-April 1875" (PDF). South Dakota History. 7 (4). South Dakota State Historical Society: 385–401.
- "Gordon Stockade". The Wi-Iyohi. 15 (11). South Dakota State Historical Society: 1–8. February 1, 1962 – via South Dakota Digital Archives.
- "Gold in South Dakota". The Wi-Iyohi. 21 (12). South Dakota State Historical Society: 1–10. March 1, 1968 – via South Dakota Digital Archives.
