= McCleave =

McCleave is a surname. Notable people with the surname include:

- Dave McCleave (1911–1988), English boxer
- Robert McCleave (1922–2004), Canadian journalist, editor, judge, lawyer and politician
- William McCleave (1825–1904), Irish-born United States Army officer
