= Friberg Township, Otter Tail County, Minnesota =

Coordinates: 46°24′42″N 95°58′13″W

Friberg Township, Minnesota
- Township
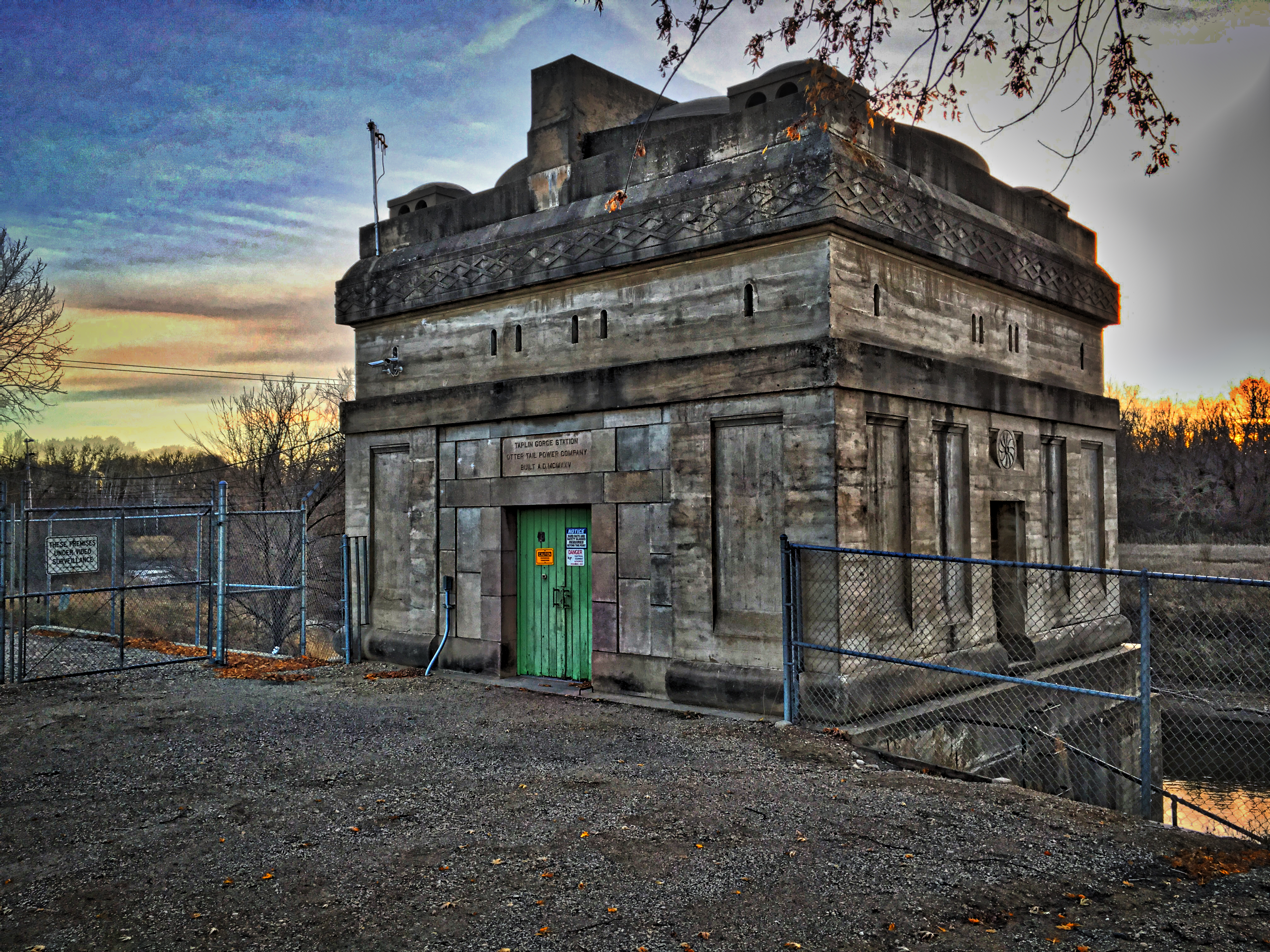
- Powerhouse of the Taplin Gorge Dam

- Location of Friberg Township, within Otter Tail County, Minnesota

- Location within the state of Minnesota Friberg Township, Minnesota (the United States)
- Country: United States
- State: Minnesota
- County: Otter Tail

Area
  - Total: 35.78 sq mi (92.7 km^{2})
  - Land: 32.22 sq mi (83.4 km^{2})
  - Water: 3.56 sq mi (9.2 km^{2})

Population (2020)
  - Total: 800
  - Density: 25/sq mi (9.6/km^{2})
- Time zone: UTC-6 (Central (CST))
  - Summer (DST): UTC-5 (CDT)
- Area code: 218

Friberg Township is a township in Otter Tail County, Minnesota, United States. The population was 800 at the 2020 census.

Friberg Township was organized in 1874, and named after Freiburg, in Germany.

== Geography ==
According to the United States Census Bureau, the township has a total area of 35.8 square miles (93 km^{2}), of which 32.7 square miles (85 km^{2}) is land and 3.0 square miles (7.8 km^{2}) (8.42%) is water.

== Demographics ==
At the 2000 census, there were 774 people, 292 households and 221 families living in the township. The population density was 23.6 per square mile (9.1/km^{2}). There were 361 housing units at an average density of 11.0/sq mi (4.3/km^{2}). The racial makeup of the township was 99.48% White, 0.13% Asian, 0.13% from other races, and 0.26% from two or more races. Hispanic or Latino of any race were 0.52% of the population.

There were 292 households, of which 37.7% had children under the age of 18 living with them, 66.4% were married couples living together, 5.5% had a female householder with no husband present, and 24.0% were non-families. 19.5% of all households were made up of individuals, and 5.5% had someone living alone who was 65 years of age or older. The average household size was 2.65 and the average family size was 3.06.

27.6% of the population were under the age of 18, 6.2% from 18 to 24, 27.5% from 25 to 44, 26.6% from 45 to 64, and 12.0% who were 65 years of age or older. The median age was 38 years. For every 100 females, there were 109.8 males. For every 100 females age 18 and over, there were 117.9 males.

The median household income was $40,556 and the median family income was $45,625. Males had a median income of $31,389 compared with $20,000 for females. The per capita income for the township was $19,184. About 6.9% of families and 8.6% of the population were below the poverty line, including 16.3% of those under age 18 and 5.3% of those age 65 or over.

== Notable people ==
- Herbert Krause, author (1905–1976)
