= Watson Parker =

Watson Parker (June 15, 1924 – January 9, 2013) was an American historian, author and academic. Parker, a professor of history at the University of Wisconsin–Oshkosh, specialized in the history of the Black Hills of South Dakota and eastern Wyoming. He was inducted into the South Dakota Hall of Fame in 2011 for his work.

== Background ==
Parker was born on June 15, 1924. He was raised on his family's dude ranch and resort, the Palmer Gulch Lodge, at the base of Black Elk Peak near Hill City, South Dakota. Hill City is called the "Heart of the Hills" because of its location near the center of the Black Hills. Parker managed the Palmer Gulch Lodge from 1948 until 1960, when he left home to study history. The Parker family continued to run the ranch until 1962. Parker received an A.B. from the University of Chicago (1948), a B.S. from Cornell University (1951), and an M.A. from the University of Oklahoma (1962). He received a doctorate in history in 1965 from the University of Oklahoma.

== Career ==
Parker authored three books, as well as numerous papers and notes on the history of the Black Hills throughout his career. Among his best known works are Deadwood: The Golden Years and Gold in the Black Hills. In a 2011 interview in which he discussed Deadwood: The Golden Years, a history of Deadwood, South Dakota, Parker recalled: "The University (of Nebraska) said they wanted a serious book about Deadwood. I told 'em '...maybe somewhat serious, but not solemn. Deadwood is not that kind of town.'"

Parker devoted considerable research to the history of the Black Hills' ghost towns. He co-authored a survey of the region's ghost towns, Black Hills Ghost Towns, with historian Hugh Lambert.

=== Teaching ===
He taught history at University of Wisconsin–Oshkosh for twenty-one years before retiring to the Black Hills. He continued to write, research and lecture after retirement. He was also a supporter and consultant for the Adams Museum & House in Deadwood.

Parker's works were used as research for the American television series Deadwood, which aired on HBO from 2004 to 2006. According to Mary Kopco, the director of the Deadwood History Foundation, the first book that Deadwood creator and director David Milch purchased as research for the show was Parker's Deadwood: The Golden Years. Milch and his staff later bought many of Parker's books and papers for the show.

== Induction into South Dakota Hall of Fame ==
In September 2011, Parker was one of fourteen South Dakotans inducted into the South Dakota Hall of Fame at a ceremony held at the Cedar Shore Resort in Oacoma, South Dakota. The other thirteen inductees included cave explorers Herb and Jan Conn, businessman Norm McKie, former Rapid City Mayor Don Barnett, Lynn Seppala, Gene Abdallah, Curtis Hage, Dana Dykhouse, Donus Roberts, Amiel Narcelle Redfish, Gary Conradi, William Hinks and Tony Dean.

Watson Parker died in Rapid City, South Dakota, on January 9, 2013, at the age of 88.

== Bibliography ==
- Watson Parker; Hugh K. Lambert (1980) [1974]. Black Hills Ghost Towns. Swallow Press. ISBN 978-0-8040-0638-5.
- Watson Parker (1981). Deadwood: The Golden Years. University of Nebraska Press. ISBN 978-0-8032-3600-4.
- Watson Parker (2012) [1982]. Gold in the Black Hills. SDSHS Press. ISBN 978-0-9852817-6-2.
