= Camp Stanford =

American Civil War tent camp in present-day California

Coordinates: 37.9626°N 121.2986°W

Camp Stanford was an American Civil War tent camp established on March 3, 1863, in present-day Stockton, California. It was located in the then undeveloped perimeter of the city, occupying two square blocks of land, now bounded by Rose, Acacia, Van Buren and Monroe streets.

The Stockton Daily Independent, of Monday, March 2, 1863, reported:

SOLDIERS -- Capt. P.B. WHANNELL, of Company G, 1st cavalry, will bring 28 men to this city on Tuesday night, to go into quarters at the camp selected by Col. BROWN, which, we are informed, will be called 'Camp Stanford.'

Camp Stanford served as the mustering point for Company G, 1st Regiment of Cavalry, California Volunteers which was mustered into the United States service on the June 12, 1863. Company F, of that regiment was mustered into service there on October 31, 1863.
