= Emil Loriks =

American politician

Emil Loriks (1895–1985) was a Democratic member of the South Dakota Senate from 1927 to 1929.

== Biography ==
Emil Loriks was born in Oldham, South Dakota in 1895. He served in the First World War.

From 1927 to 1934, he was the leader of the Farmers' Holiday Association. He also served as South Dakota state senator from 1927 to 1929. In 1938, he lost the election against Republican Karl Mundt. He served as President of the South Dakota chapter of the National Farmers Union from 1934 to 1938, and of the Farmer's Union Grain Terminal Association from 1957 to 1967. In 1976, he bought the Loriks Peterson Heritage House in Oldham, which is now on the National Register of Historic Places.

In 1980, he was the first recipient of the South Dakota Farmers Union Award for Meritorious Service. He received honorary degrees from South Dakota State University and Dakota State University, and he was a charter member of the South Dakota Hall of Fame. In 1985, he was inducted into the South Dakota Association of Cooperatives Hall of Fame. He died the same year.

== Bibliography ==
- Elizabeth E. Williams, Emil Loriks: builder of a new economic order (Center for Western Studies, 1987)
