= South Dakota Hall of Fame =

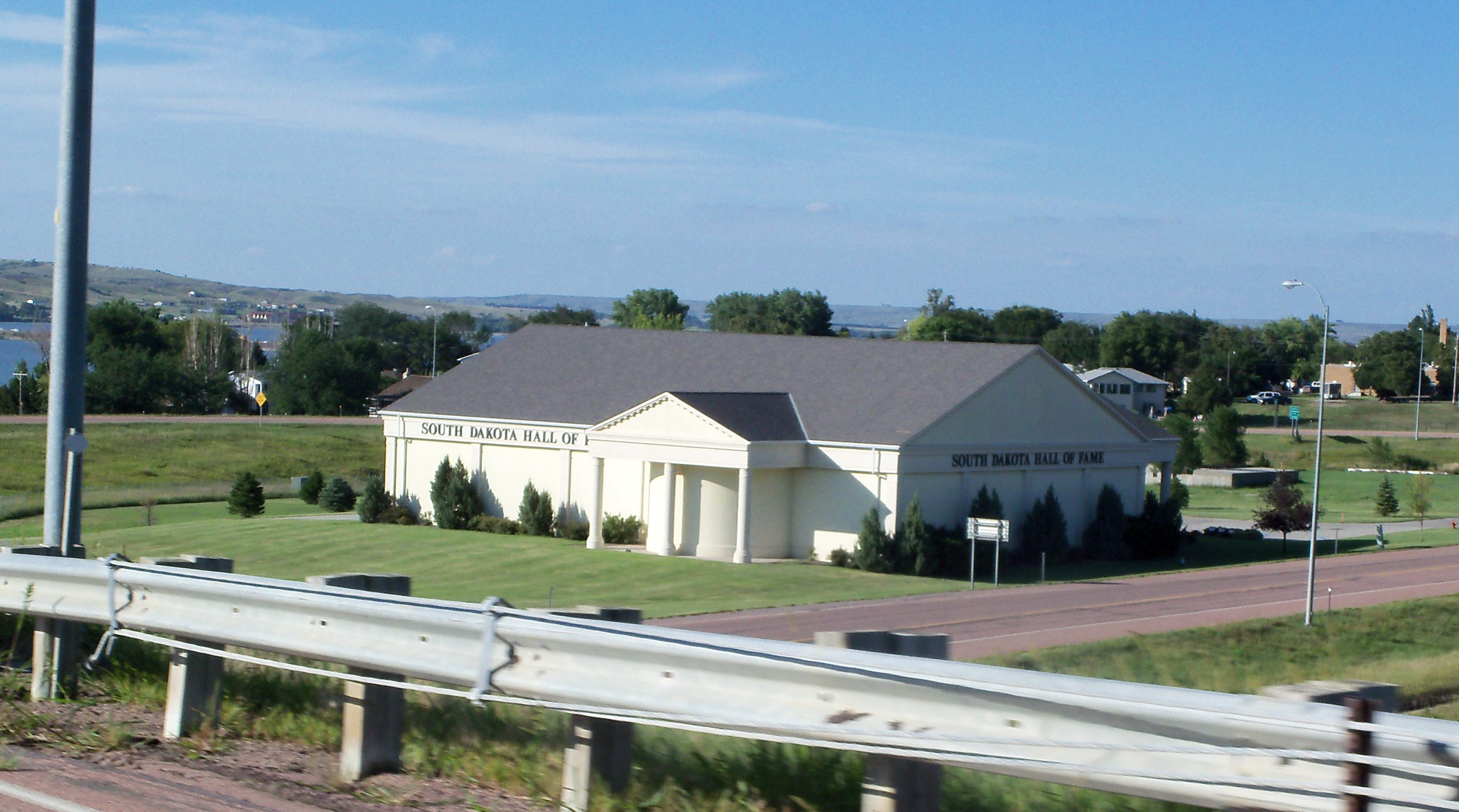
- South Dakota Hall of Fame Visitor & Education Center
- Established: 1974
- Location: 1480 S. Main St., Chamberlain, South Dakota
- Coordinates: 43°47′49″N 99°20′29″W
- Type: Hall of fame; history museum
- Parking: yes
- Website: Official website

The South Dakota Hall of Fame is an American award for excellence among South Dakotans. Established in 1974, the South Dakota State Legislature named the organization the state's official hall of fame in 1996. The hall is a museum detailing "acts of excellence", the host of an annual honors ceremony, a statewide K-12 South Dakota History Program, and a Visitor and Education Center in Chamberlain that opened in June 2000. More than 700 South Dakotans have been inducted into the Hall of Fame, and their stories of excellence with supporting media are available online.

== Programs ==
The South Dakota Hall of Fame's main program is the hall of fame itself, called the Legacies of Achievement. About 50 to 70 South Dakotans are nominated every year, and 10 are inducted.

The center also runs the Acts of Excellence program, by which organizations and individuals are recognized for "building a culture of excellence in South Dakota, one act at a time". This focuses on acts that focus on the betterment of society, culture, and quality of life in the state, and is sponsored by Sanford Health. A list of recipients is kept on the South Dakota Hall of Fame website.

== History ==
In 1996, the South Dakota State Hall of Fame was named the state's official hall of fame by the South Dakota State Legislature. In June 2000, the South Dakota Hall of Fame opened their Visitor & Education Center in Chamberlain.

== Inductees ==
As of 2023, over 700 people have been inducted into the South Dakota Hall of Fame across seven categories: agriculture, arts and entertainment, general notability, historical figures, political, professional, and sports.

Category	Inductees
Agriculture	9
Arts and Entertainment	110
General	326
Historical	50
Political	6
Professional	215
Sports	40

=== Notable inductees ===
Name	Image	Birth–Death	Hometown	Year	Category
Cleveland Abbott		1894–1955	Watertown, South Dakota	2018	Professional
James W. Abbott		b. 1948	Vermillion, South Dakota	2017	Professional
Gene G. Abdallah		1936–2019	Sioux Falls, South Dakota	2011	General
James Abdnor		1923–2012	Kennebec, South Dakota	1995	General
James Abourezk		1931–2023	Sioux Falls, South Dakota	2012	General
Stan Adelstein		b. 1931	Rapid City, South Dakota	2006	General
Lewis Akeley		1861–1961	Clarendon, New York	1978	General
Arthur Amiotte		b. 1942	Pine Ridge, South Dakota	1997	Arts and Entertainment
Emma E. Amiotte		1913–1997	Manderson, South Dakota	1987	Historical
George "Sparky" Anderson		1934–2010	Bridgewater, South Dakota	2007	Sports
Vernon Ashley		1916–2015	Buffalo County, South Dakota	1991	Historical
Bob Barker		1923–2023	Mission, South Dakota	1980	Arts and Entertainment
L. Frank Baum		1856–1919	Chittenango, New York	2002	Arts and Entertainment
William Henry Harrison Beadle		1838–1915	Madison, South Dakota	1979	General
Tom Berry		1879–1951	Belvidere, South Dakota	1978	General
Black Elk		1863–1950	Manderson, South Dakota	2018	Historical
Andrew Wendell Bogue		1919–2009	Parker, South Dakota	2017	Professional
Gutzon Borglum		1867–1941	Bear Lake County, Idaho	1978	Arts and Entertainment
Ordell Braase		1932–2019	Mitchell, South Dakota	2005	Sports
Hilton Briggs		1913–2001	Cairo, Iowa	1980	Professional
Jeff Broin		b. 1965	Dell Rapids, South Dakota	2017	Professional
Tom Brokaw		b. 1940	Webster, South Dakota	1991	Arts and Entertainment
Eugene Buechel		1874–1954	Fulda, Germany	1978	General
Charles H. Burke		1861–1944	Pierre, South Dakota	1981	General
John Cacavas		1930–2014	Aberdeen, South Dakota	1994	Arts and Entertainment
Gary Cammack		b. 1953	Union Center, South Dakota	2021	Agriculture
William L. Carberry		1885–1973		1978	Sports
Francis Case		1896–1962	Everly, Iowa	1978	General
Charles Badger Clark		1883–1957	Deadwood, South Dakota	1978	Arts and Entertainment
Jan and Herb Conn		1924–2023 (Jan); 1920–2012 (Herb)	White Mountains, New Hampshire	2011	Historical
Harvey Dunn		1884–1952	Manchester, South Dakota	1978	Arts and Entertainment
Crazy Horse		c. 1843–1877	near Rapid Creek, South Dakota	1978	Historical
Dennis Daugaard		b. 1953	Dell Rapids, South Dakota	2022	Political
Virginia Driving Hawk Sneve		b. 1933	Rosebud, South Dakota	1984	Arts and Entertainment
Eagle Woman		1820–1888		2010	Historical
Charles Eastman		1858–1939	Manitoba, Canada	1978	Professional
Newton Edmunds		1819–1908	Yankton, South Dakota	1978	General
Joe Foss		1915–2003	Sioux Falls, South Dakota	1978	General
Chief Gall		1832–1896	Standing Rock Reservation, North Dakota	1978	Historical
Harry Gamage		1900–1994	Macomb, Illinois	1978	Sports
Tim Giago		1934–2022	Pine Ridge, South Dakota	1994	Arts and Entertainment
Delta David Gier		b. 1960	Sioux Falls, South Dakota	2020	Arts and Entertainment
Hugh Glass		c. 1783–1833	Pennsylvania	1982	Historical
Alice Gossage		1861–1929	Vermillion, South Dakota	1978	Arts and Entertainment
John Grass		1837–1918	Standing Rock Reservation, North Dakota	1978	Historical
Bill Groethe		1923–2020	Rapid City, South Dakota	2019	Arts and Entertainment
Alvin Hansen		1887–1975	Viborg, South Dakota	1978	General
Carroll Hardy		1933–2020	Sturgis, South Dakota	1992	Sports
Mary Hart		b. 1950	Sioux Falls, South Dakota	1992	Arts and Entertainment
Garney Henley		b. 1935	Hayti, South Dakota	1979	Sports
Stephanie Herseth Sandlin		b. 1970	Groton, South Dakota	2017	General
Carole Hillard		1936–2007	Rapid City, South Dakota	2007	General
Oscar Howe		1915–1983	Crow Creek Reservation, South Dakota	1979	Arts and Entertainment
Laura Ingalls Wilder		1867–1957	Pepin, Wisconsin	1978	Arts and Entertainment
Iron Nation		1815–1894	Lower Brule Reservation, South Dakota	2006	Historical
Bill Janklow		1939–2012	Chicago, Illinois	2013	General
Harold Jones		1909–2002	Santee, Nebraska	1978	General
Tim Johnson		b. 1946	Vermillion, South Dakota	2019	Political
Robert Karolevitz		1922–2011	Yankton, South Dakota	1978	Arts and Entertainment
Herbert Krause		1905–1976	Fergus Falls, Minnesota	1978	General
Shantel Krebs		b. 1973	Canton, South Dakota	2022	Political
Alice Kundert		1920–2013	Mobridge, South Dakota	1990	General
Ernest Lawrence		1901–1958	Canton, South Dakota	1978	Professional
Emil Loriks		1895–1985	Kingsbury County, South Dakota	1979	General
Stanley Marshall		1927–1980	Centerville, South Dakota	1980	Sports
George McGovern		1922–2012	Mitchell, South Dakota	1994	General
Vern McKee		1930–2004	Huron, South Dakota	2004	Sports
James McLaughlin		1842–1923	Ontario, Canada	1978	Professional
Donald E. Messer		b. 1941	Kimball, South Dakota	2008	General
Don Meyer		1944–2014	Wayne, Nebraska	2012	Sports
Oscar Micheaux		1884–1951	Metropolis, Illinois	2001	Arts and Entertainment
George S. Mickelson		1941–1993	Selby, South Dakota	2002	General
George T. Mickelson		1903–1965	Selby, South Dakota	1987	General
Billy Mills		b. 1938	Pine Ridge, South Dakota	1980	Sports
Ted Muenster			Vermillion, South Dakota	2009	Professional
Al Neuharth		1924–2013	Alpena, South Dakota	1980	Arts and Entertainment
Judy Olson Duhamel		b. 1939	Rapid City, South Dakota	2014	General
Watson Parker		1924–2013	Hill City, South Dakota	2011	Historical
Lyndell Petersen		b. 1931	Quinn, South Dakota	2019	Agriculture
Richard F. Pettigrew		1848–1926	Ludlow, Vermont	1978	General
Larry Pressler		b. 1942	Humboldt, South Dakota	2020	Political
Wayne Rasmussen		b. 1942	Howard, South Dakota	1981	Sports
Red Cloud		1822–1909	Platte River, Nebraska	1978	Historical
Gabriel Renville		1825–1892	Big Stone Lake, South Dakota	1978	Historical
Pete Retzlaff		1931–2020	Ellendale, North Dakota	1978	Sports
Joe Robbie		1916–1990	Sisseton, South Dakota	1985	Sports
T. Denny Sanford		b. 1935	Sioux Falls, South Dakota	2007	Professional
Sitting Bull		1834–1890	Bullhead, South Dakota	1978	Historical
Spotted Tail		c. 1823–1881		1978	Historical
Struck by the Ree		c. 1804–1888	Yankton, South Dakota	1978	Historical
Clark Swisher		1916–2005	Vermillion, South Dakota	1978	Sports
Tasunka Kokipapi		c. 1836–1893	Pine Ridge Reservation, South Dakota	1978	Historical
Casey Tibbs		1929–1990	Fort Pierre, South Dakota	1978	Historical
Norm Van Brocklin		1926–1983	Walnut Creek, California	1991	Sports
Eugene Luther Vidal		1895–1969	Madison, South Dakota	1978	Sports
Adam Vinatieri		b. 1972	Rapid City, South Dakota	2023	Sports
Sox Walseth		1926–2004	Pierre, South Dakota	1978	Sports
Lee Warne		1922–2002	Pierre, South Dakota	1988	General
Howard Wood		1883–1949	Sioux Falls, South Dakota	2010	Sports
Korczak Ziolkowski		1908–1982	Boston, Massachusetts	1988	Arts and Entertainment
Ruth Ziolkowski		1926–2014	West Hartford, Connecticut	1988	Arts and Entertainment

== See also ==
- List of museums in South Dakota
