= Thoen Stone =

Inscribed stone found in South Dakota, US

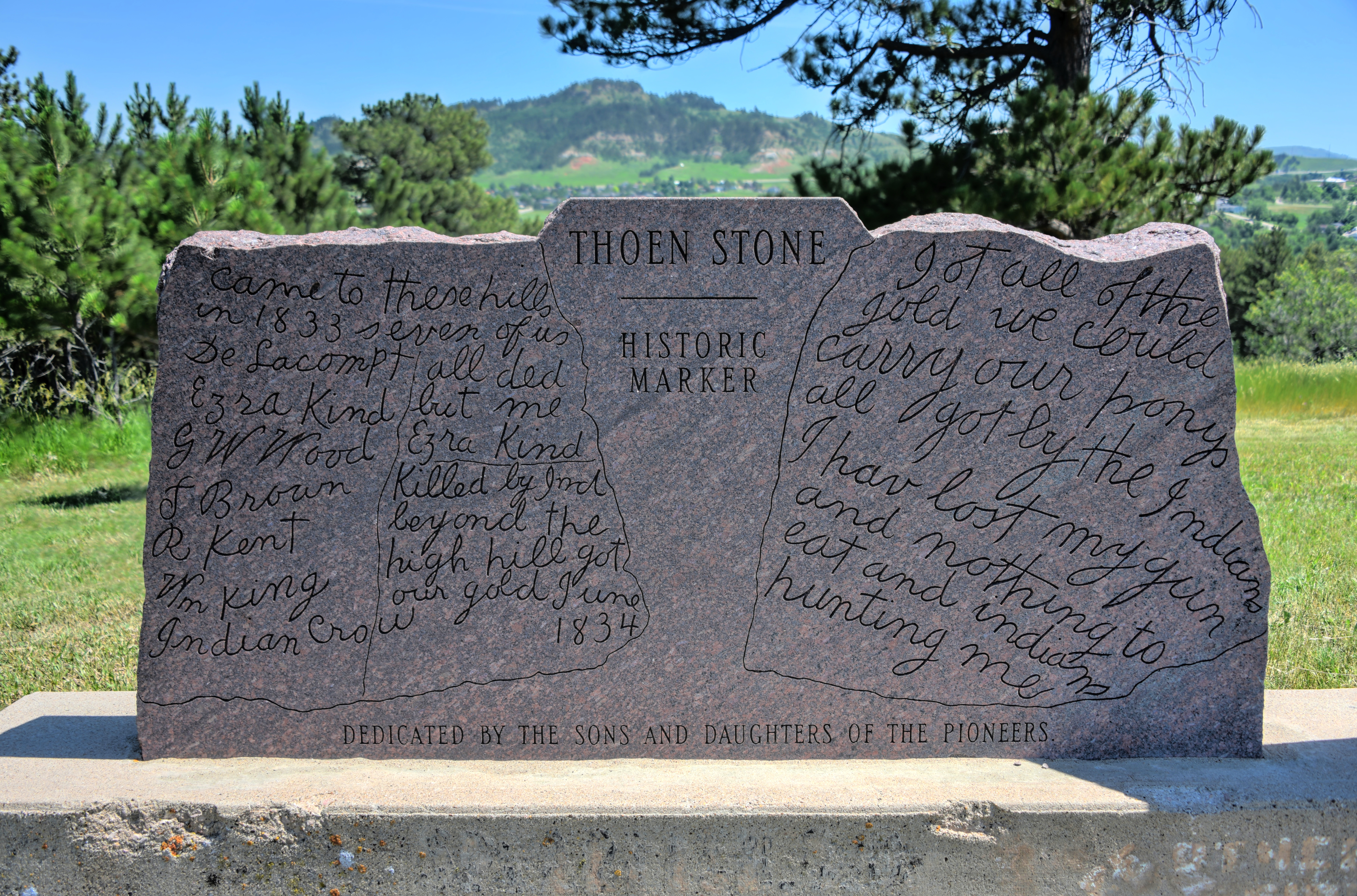
- Thoen Stone replica monument above Spearfish City Park
- Material: Sandstone
- Size: 10 by 8 by 3 inches (254 mm × 203 mm × 76 mm)
- Writing: English
- Created: 1834 CE
- Discovered: March 14, 1887 on Lookout Mountain, Black Hills, South Dakota, United States
- Present location: Adams Museum & House, Deadwood, South Dakota

The Thoen Stone is an inscribed sandstone slab that was discovered in the Black Hills of South Dakota by Louis Thoen in 1887. The inscription, dated 1834, was supposedly made by the last survivor of a gold mining party whose members were killed by Native Americans after discovering gold in the area. The discovery of the stone called into question the first discovery of gold in the Black Hills and the history of gold mining in the area; if the account provided by the inscription is authentic, it would mean that gold was discovered in the Black Hills 40 years before the Custer Expedition of 1874 and the subsequent Black Hills Gold Rush. It is currently on display at the Adams Museum & House in Deadwood, South Dakota.

== History ==
=== Background ===
The early history of the people mentioned in the inscription is limited. According to the stone, Ezra Kind traveled to the Black Hills in 1833 in search of gold, at which time a treaty prevented the party from entering the area legally. Among Kind's party were seven men: De Lacompt, G.W. Wood, T. Brown, R. Kent, William King, and Indian Crow. King and Indian Crow were experienced miners.

The stone itself was inscribed in 1834 by Ezra Kind after his entire party was killed by Native Americans. Kind himself later died of unknown causes.

=== Discovery ===
On March 14, 1887, Norwegian immigrants and brothers Louis and Ivan Thoen discovered the slab while collecting sandstone on the west face of Lookout Mountain near their home in Spearfish. The stone was buried several feet below the surface. The men took the slab home, and Louis invited Henry Keats (a later mayor of Spearfish) to see the stone and the location where it was found. The stone was then taken to the Spearfish Register. One day later, Louis decided to display it in a store in Spearfish that was owned by John Cashner; Cashner and Louis sold pictures of the stone as postcards. In 1888, Cashner traveled to the Detroit Free Press in Michigan and sold the story of the stone to the newspaper. Louis died in 1919 during the Spanish flu epidemic. The stone was named for Louis Thoen and was transferred to the Adams Museum in Deadwood for preservation and display.

=== Legacy ===
Spearfish historian Frank Thomson formed the Thoen Stone Committee in 1950, which aimed to memorialize it at the site it was discovered. Three Thoen relatives were also among the committee members. A monument complete with a replica of the stone was later placed on a hill above the Spearfish City Park, and an annual seven-mile run past the marker is named after the stone. In 1966, Thomson published a book about the stone, titled The Thoen Stone: A Saga of the Black Hills.

== Description ==
The Thoen Stone is carved out of sandstone. It is three inches thick and measures 10 inches by eight inches.

=== Inscription ===
Text is written in a cursive font on both sides of the slab. The inscription reads:

Front:

Came to these hills
in 1833 seven of us
De Lacompt
Ezra Kind
GW Wood
T Brown
R Kent
Wm King
Indian Crow
all ded [sic]
but me
Ezra Kind
Killed by Ind[ians]
beyond the
high hill got
our gold June
1834

Back:

got all of the
gold we could
carry our ponys [sic]
all got by the Indians
I hav [sic] lost my gun
and nothing to
eat and Indians
hunting me

== Investigation and controversy ==
Since its discovery in 1887, controversy over the authenticity of the Thoen Stone has circulated. Many people believe that the stone is a hoax and was fabricated by Louis and Ivan Thoen. Some have pointed to the fact that Louis Thoen was a stonemason. Others doubted that a man running for his life would have stopped to leave a message, or that seven men—most of whom had no mining experience—could have found as much gold as described on the stone. Until their deaths, the Thoens defended the authenticity of the stone.

The 1888 Detroit Free Press article urged anyone with information on the men mentioned on the stone to contact Cashner. One reply came from a Harvey Brown, Jr., who alleged his half-uncle, William Thompson Brown, had left Michigan for the American West with a man named Kent in 1832, and neither man had returned nor had been heard from again.

=== Thomson investigation ===
In the 1950s, Thomson traveled to the East Coast in search of the families of the party's members. Thomson located several families, all with surnames similar to those listed on the Thoen Stone, who claimed to have had ancestors who disappeared in the American West around 1830. Some of these relatives had written back to their families before their disappearances. One, Kent, allegedly had sent a letter—possibly using one of the American Fur Company trading posts in the territory—reporting that he had found gold and would be returning home. Thompson also found evidence that Brown grew up in North Carolina during a local gold rush and may have gained knowledge of placer mining techniques during that time. Additionally, King and Indian Crow were both from Lumpkin County, Georgia, where another local gold rush took place in the 1820s. Thomson found that Kind himself was a German immigrant to Pennsylvania, and that he had indeed left home to travel west in the 1830s and disappeared.

Thomson theorized that the attack on the party may have been orchestrated by the American Fur Company as a way to dissuade outside encroachment in its territory, and found evidence that the company had indeed sponsored attacks on other parties from its positions at Fort Pierre Chouteau and Fort Clark.

Thomson also believed that the hunting knives carried by pioneers in the 1830s would have been sturdy enough to inscribe a message in a wet sandstone slab, and theorized that Kind would have had ample time while hiding to carve something.

=== Modern investigations ===
In the 2000s, handwriting expert Marion Briggs and another in California compared the handwriting on the postcards and the writing on the slab. Both determined that the inscriptions were not done by the same person, and the stone was not inscribed by either of the two Thoen brothers, Cashner, or John S. McClintock, who was an early advocate for the slab's authenticity.

== In popular culture ==
Doom metal band Pine Beetle has a song called "Thoen", which is based on the Thoen Stone mystery.
