= Herbert Krause =

American author and historian (1905–1976)

- Born: Herbert Arthur Krause; May 25, 1905; Friberg Township, Minnesota
- Died: September 22, 1976 (aged 71); Sioux Falls, South Dakota
- Occupations: Historian; author; professor

Academic background
- Education: St. Olaf College (B.A.); University of Iowa (M.A.)
- Writing career
- Notable works: Wind Without Rain, The Thresher, The Oxcart Trail
- Notable awards: Friends of American Writers Award, 1939

Herbert Arthur Krause (May 25, 1905 – September 22, 1976) was an American historian, author and college professor. He was born and educated in Minnesota and South Dakota, where he taught and wrote. He was the author of novels, plays, poems, essays, and reviews. He also worked towards preservation of cultural heritage.

== Background ==
Herbert Arthur Krause, a third-generation German American, was born on May 25, 1905, on a small farm in Friberg Township, Otter Tail County, north of Fergus Falls, Minnesota, to Arthur Adolph Krause (a farmer and blacksmith) and Bertha Peters. He was educated at St. Olaf College (B.A., 1933) and the University of Iowa (M.A., 1935).

He taught at the University of Iowa starting in 1938. After the success of Wind Without Rain, he moved to Augustana College (now known as Augustana University) in Sioux Falls, South Dakota, where he taught in the English department and was director of the Center for Western Studies until his 1976 death.

== Career as writer ==
Krause was influenced by the writing of Ole Rolvaag, with whom he had hoped to study at St. Olaf but was unable to do so. He wrote three novels, Wind Without Rain, The Thresher, and The Oxcart Trail, detailing the prairies of the American West. Herbert Krause won the Friends of American Writers Award in 1939 for Wind Without Rain.

== Death and legacy ==
Herbert Krause died of congestive heart failure in 1976, at the age of 71, in Sioux Falls.

In 1978 he was inducted into the South Dakota Hall of Fame, in the category of Education & Cultural Affairs. The Herbert A. Krause Collection at the Center for Western Studies contains collections of his papers and correspondence.

== Selected bibliography ==
- Neighbor Boy. (Midland House, Iowa City, Iowa: 1939)
- Wind without Rain. (1939; rpt. Sioux Falls, South Dakota: Brevet Press, 1976)
- The Thresher. (1946; rpt. Brevet Press. Sioux Falls, South Dakota: 1980)
- Giant in the Wooded Earth; Minnesota centennial verses (St. Olaf College. Northfield, Minnesota. 1962)
- The Oxcart Trail. (1954; rpt. Brevet Press, Sioux Falls, South Dakota: 1976)
- Prelude to Glory: A Newspaper Accounting of Custer's 1874 Expedition to the Black Hills (Edited by Gary Olson. Brevet Press, Sioux Falls, South Dakota: 1974)
- Birding in the Northern Plains: The Ornithological Writings of Herbert Krause (Ronald R. Nelson, Editor. The Center for Western Studies. 2008)
- Poems and Essays of Herbert Krause (Arthur R Huseboe, editor. Center for Western Studies. Sioux Falls, South Dakota. 1990)

== Additional sources ==
- Huseboe, Arthur R., Herbert Krause (Boise State University. Western Series No. 66, December 1985) available online via Western Writers Series Digital Editions
- Paulson, Kristoffer E., Ole Rolvaag, Herbert Krause and the Frontier Thesis of Frederick Jackson Turner ( from Where the West Begins, edited by Arthur R. Huseboe and William Geyer, pp. 22–33, Center for Western Studies Press. Sioux Falls, South Dakota. 1978)
