= Robert Karolevitz =

American writer and humorist (1922–2011)

- Born: Robert Francis Karolevitz; April 26, 1922; Yankton, South Dakota, U.S.
- Died: June 17, 2011 (aged 89); Yankton, South Dakota, U.S.
- Education: Yankton High School; South Dakota State University; University of Oregon
- Occupations: Author; humorist
- Spouse: Phyllis Gunderson (m. 1951)
- Children: 2
- Parent(s): Frank Karolevitz; Martha Rathjen

Robert Francis Karolevitz (April 26, 1922 – June 17, 2011) was an American author and humorist from Yankton, South Dakota. His writing focused on biography, humor, and history, among other topics. He has been described as "one of South Dakota's most prolific authors".

== Biography ==
Karolevitz was born in Yankton, South Dakota, to Frank and Martha Karolevitz (née Rathjen). He grew up in Yankton, where he attended Sacred Heart School and graduated from Yankton High School in 1940. He fought in the United States Army Infantry in both Japan and the Philippines during World War II. He earned his bachelor's degree from South Dakota State University and his master's degree from the University of Oregon. In 1971, he received the Wrangler Award from the National Cowboy & Western Heritage Museum. He served as chairman of South Dakota's State Regional Advisory Group for Comprehensive Health Planning, a member of the Committee for Medical Advancement in South Dakota, a trustee of Sacred Heart Hospital in Yankton, and a South Dakota State Historical Society board member. He played a major role in the establishment of both the medical school at the University of South Dakota and the Lewis and Clark Health Education and Service Center. In 1973, he became one of the first people to be inducted into the South Dakota Hall of Fame. In 2006, he received the Robinson Award from the governor of South Dakota. In 2014, he was named a "health pioneer" by the South Dakota Department of Health.

== Personal life ==
Karolevitz married Phyllis Gunderson on January 4, 1951; they remained married until his death. They had two daughters: Jan Marie and Martha Jill. Robert Karolevitz died on June 17, 2011, at Avera Sister James Care Center in Yankton.
