= Emma E. Amiotte =

Oglala Lakota artist

Emma E. Amiotte (1913–1997) was an Oglala Lakota artist.

== Biography ==
Amiotte was born in Manderson, South Dakota on April 25, 1913 or 1914. She was the adopted daughter of Maggie Red Bear and the aunt of Arthur Amiotte, also a Lakota artist.

In the 1940s and/or 1950s, she was a live-in housekeeper for the Wilkins family when they lived in the Black Hills Model Home, placed on the National Register of Historic Homes in 2004. She is one of two notable people who lived in the house.

She worked in The Tipi Shop, located in the Sioux Indian Museum, which sold indigenous arts and crafts. Through the shop, Amiotte and other women helped raise funds for the constructions of a new Sioux Indian Museum in 2016.

Amiotte died on August 16, 1997, in Gillette, Wyoming, and was buried in Mt. Calvary Cemetery, Rapid City, SD.

== Artist ==
Amiotte worked as a miniaturist, making replica dolls, tipis, horses, sweat lodges, and scenes of tribal life. She used traditional materials such as quills, feathers, bones, and animal skins in her work. Her dolls are in the permanent collection of the South Dakota Art Museum.

In 1987, Amiotte was inducted into the South Dakota Hall of Fame.

== See also ==
- Amiotte, E., United States Indian Arts and Crafts Board, & Sioux Indian Museum and Crafts Center. (1973). Miniatures by Emma Amiotte: [an exhibition January 21 to February 17, 1973]. Sioux Indian Museum and Crafts Center.
