= 1st California Cavalry Regiment =

1st Regiment California Volunteer Cavalry
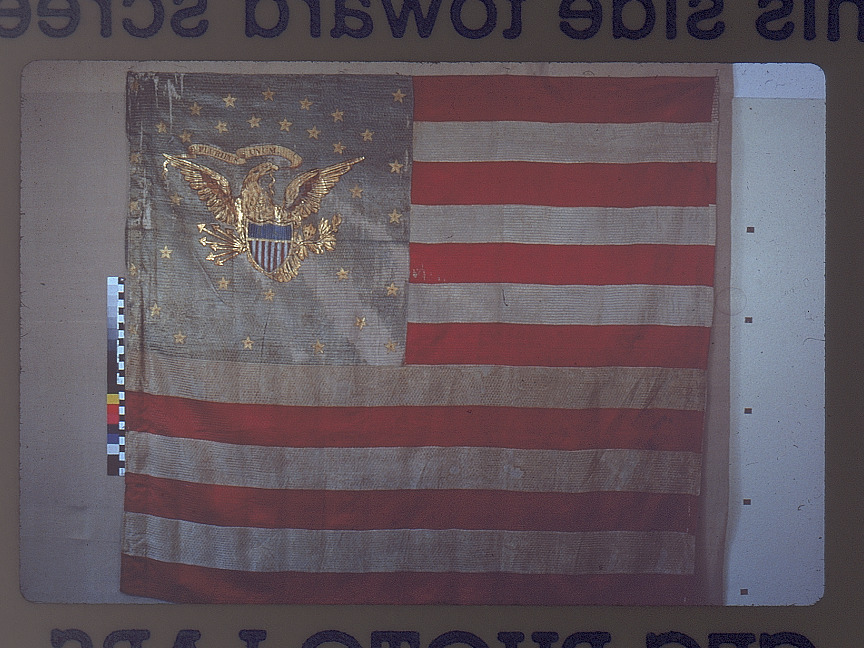
- National color of the regiment
- Active: September 1861 to October 21, 1866
- Country: United States
- Allegiance: Union
- Branch: Cavalry
- Engagements: American Civil War: Capture of the Showalter Party (Co. B); Battle of Stanwix Station (Co. A); Battle of Picacho Pass (Co. A); Capture of Tucson (Co. B); Battle of Spencers Ranch (Co. A); First Battle of Adobe Walls (Co. B, K, M); Battle of Fort Buchanan (Co. L)

The 1st Regiment California Cavalry was a cavalry regiment in the Union Army during the American Civil War. First formed as a battalion, the unit later expanded to regimental size.

== History ==
The regiment was first formed as the 1st Battalion, 1st Regiment California Cavalry (five companies) between August and October 31, 1861, at Camp Merchant near Oakland. After the battalion was organized, it was sent to Southern California, with three companies stationed at Camp Latham, near Los Angeles, and two at Camp Carleton, near San Bernardino. From November 20–29, 1861, the detachment under Second Lt. C. R. Wellman was stationed at Camp Wright, and pursued and captured Dan Showalter's party west of the San Jose Valley and Warner's Ranch.

The battalion remained in Southern California until the spring of 1862, when it became part of the California Column and was the advance force during the march to New Mexico Territory and Texas. In 1863, seven more companies were raised to bring the regiment to a full strength of twelve companies. The five original companies were mustered out on August 31, 1864, when the terms of service of most of the men expired. Two new companies, B and C, were organized in New Mexico by the consolidation of men whose terms had not expired, combined with new enlistments, and two new companies, A and E, were organized in California and then sent to Arizona. All of the companies of First California Cavalry (Companies B, C, F, G, H, K, and M) stationed in New Mexico and Texas were ordered to assemble at Baird’s Ranch, near Albuquerque, and were mustered out of service during September, 1866. The 1st California Cavalry Regiment spent its entire term of service in the western United States in California, New Mexico Territory (and Arizona Territory once it was organized), and Texas.

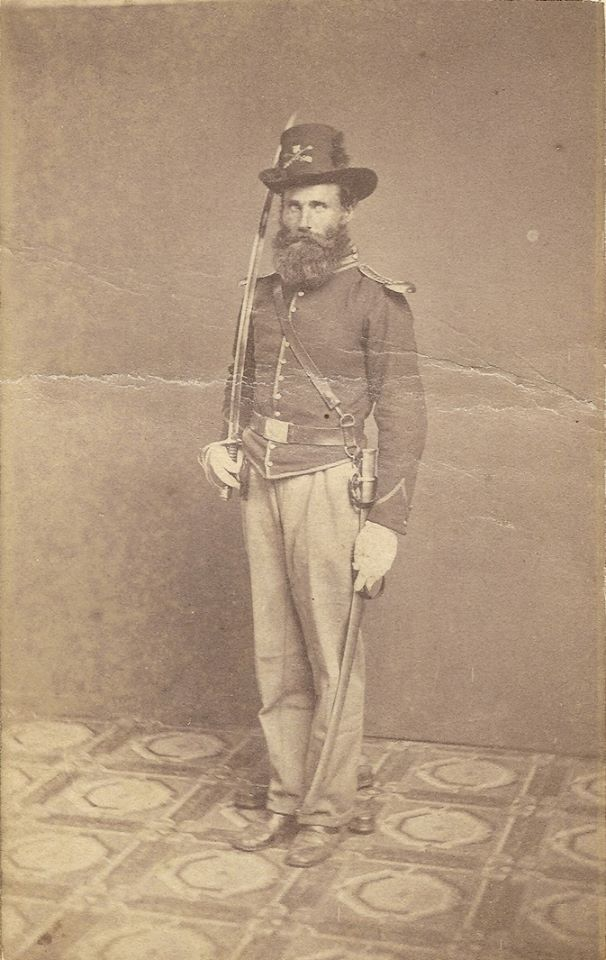
Chauncey G. Smith of Company M

== Commanders ==
- Colonel Benjamin F. Davis August 19, 1861 - November 1, 1861
- Lt. Colonel Edward E. Eyre November 1, 1861 - November 30, 1862
- Colonel David Ferguson November 30, 1862 - November 6, 1863
- Colonel Oscar M. Brown November 6, 1863 - December 31, 1865
- Lt. Colonel Clarence E. Bennett December 31, 1865 - October 19, 1866
- Major William McCleave October 19, 1866 - October 21, 1866

== Flags ==
The regiment has one national flag and two company guidons on display in the state capitol. Other flags were described by newspapers. Most of the companies' flags were made by the locals of the area. During the war Lieutenant Merriam of Company L captured a Confederate flag that was hanging in a church window in San Joaquin County.

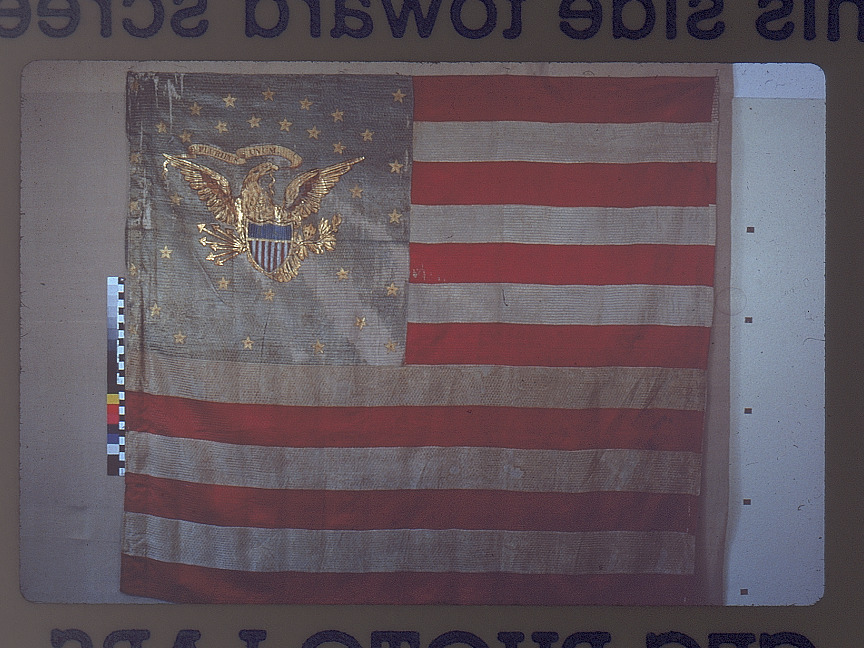
National Flag in the state capitol

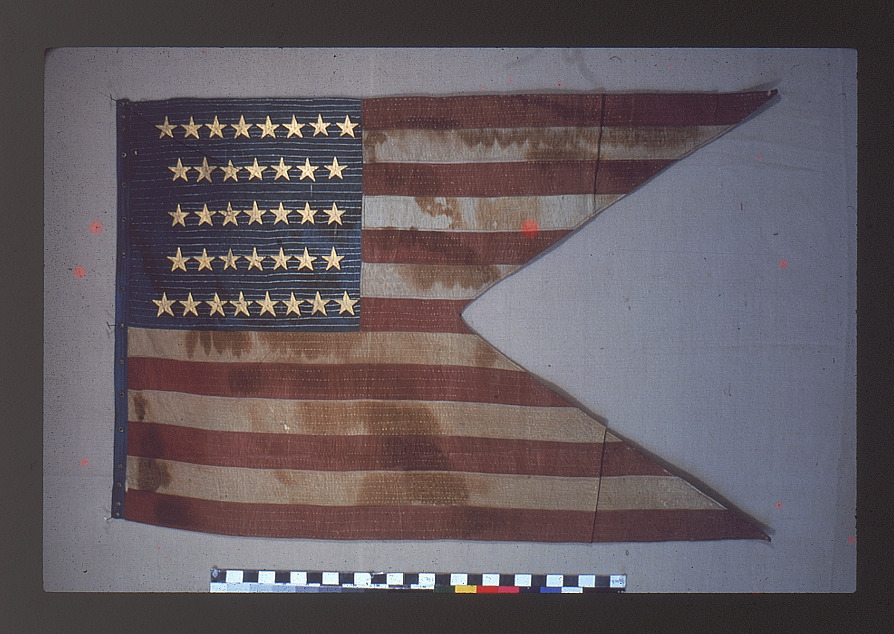
Company M National Guidon in the state capitol

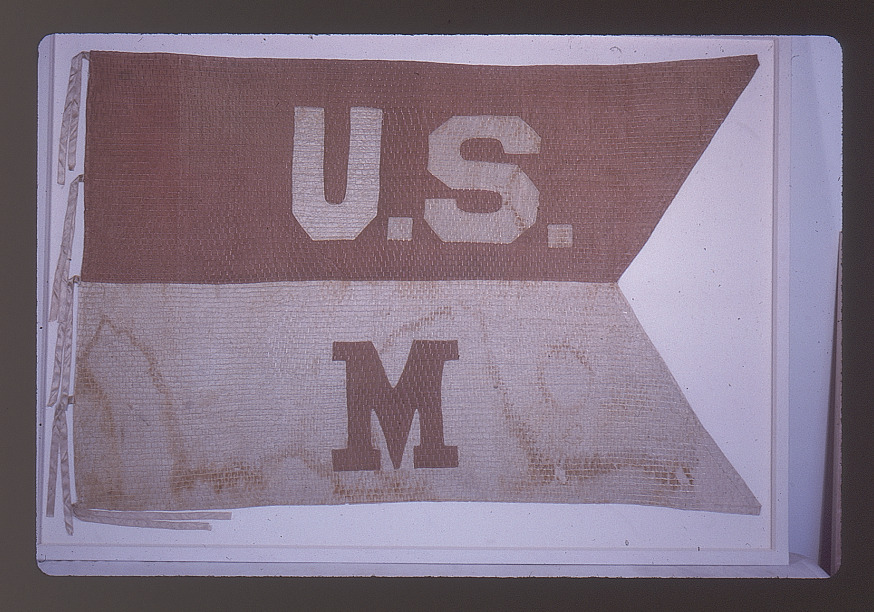
Company M Guidon in the state capitol

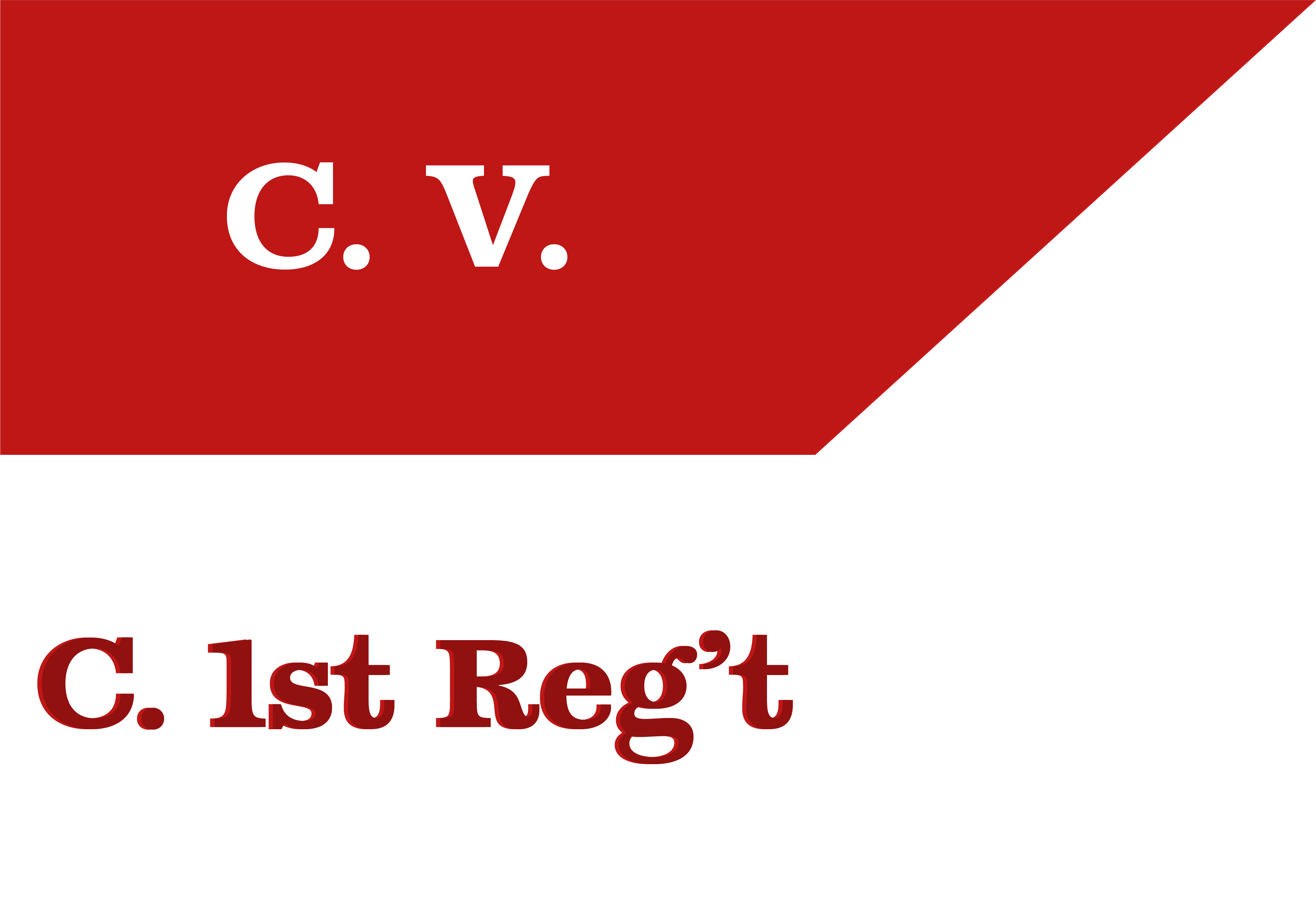
Digital reconstruction of Company C Guidon based on newspapers accounts

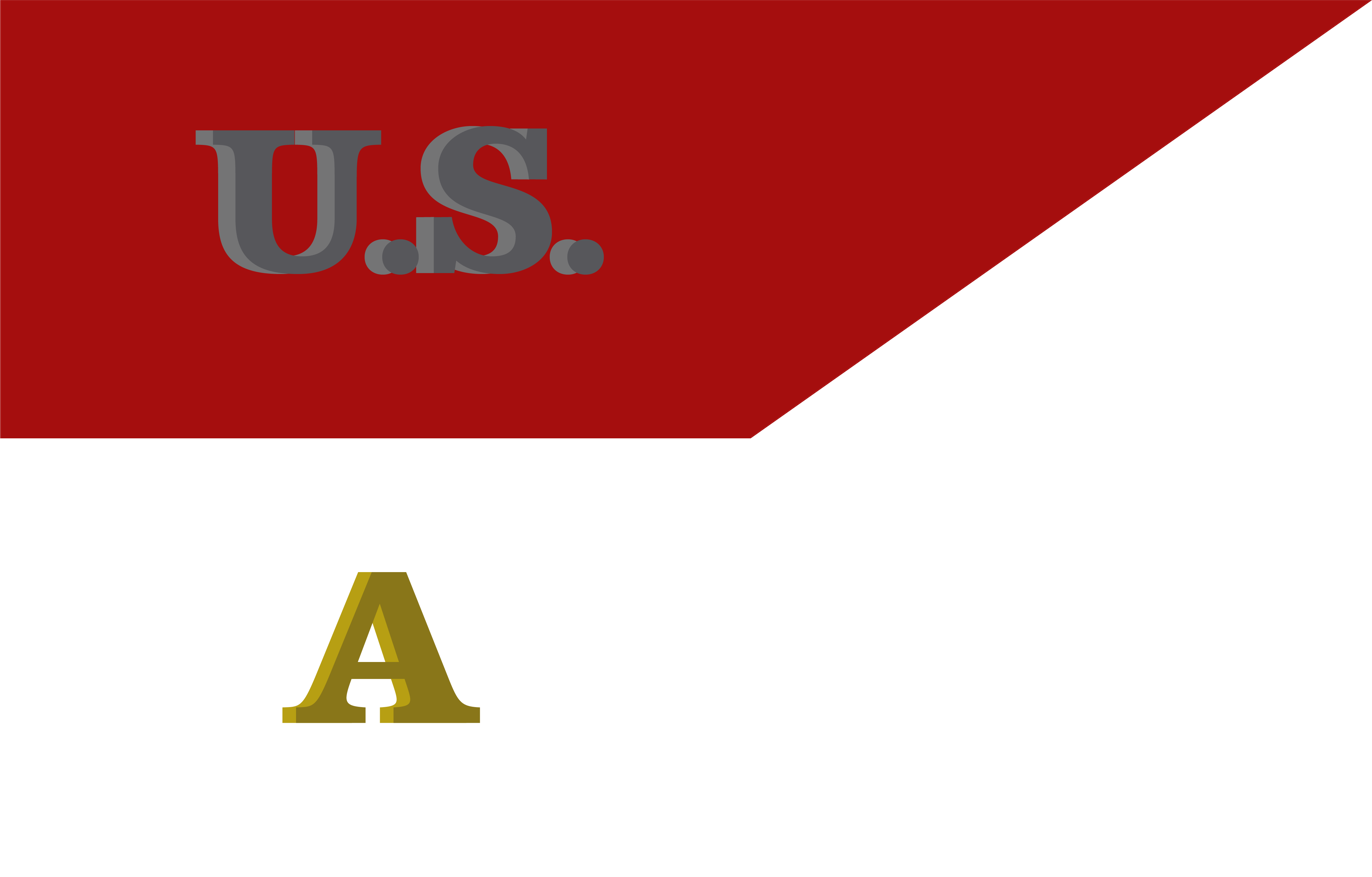
Digital reconstruction of Company A Guidon describe by a local newspaper

== Company assignments ==
- Company A: October,1861 sent to Camp Carleton San Bernardino County from Oakland. Duty there until March 1, 1862. Marched to Fort Yuma and on to Stanwix Rancho by March 16. March 29, 1862 Skirmish six miles beyond Stanwix Rancho on the Gila River. A small scouting party of the company under Lt. James Barrett engaged in battle at Picacho Pass in which he and 2 others were killed and 3 wounded April 16, 1862. On December 29, 1863 1st Lient. Samuel H. Allyne was killed by a fellow soldier in San Elizario. April 3, 1864, a detachment of 25 troops led by Captain Albert H. French left San Elizario, Texas for Spencers Ranch near Presidio Del Norte. On the 15th they ambushed 10 Confederate soldiers there, killing the captain and three others. Two escaped and four more were taken prisoner. No Californians were wounded. The Confederate camp was located and the muskets, ammunition, and horses were emancipated. The skirmish over, the detachment and their prisoners returned to San Elizario on April 24, having covered 499 miles.
- Company B: October 1861 sent to Camp Wright. November 20–29, 1861, Second Lt. C. R. Wellman pursued and captured Daniel Showalter's party near Warner's Ranch, west of the San Jose Valley. [2nd Lt. Wellman was in Company B according to Records of California Men in the War of the Rebellion.]
- Company C:
- Company D:
- Company E:
- Company F: Mustered at Camp Stanford October 31, 1863.
- Company G: Mustered at Camp Stanford June 12, 1863.
- Company H:
- Company I:
- Company J:
- Company K: Organized at Camp Merchant, Oakland, California; moved to Camp Morris in October 1863, in San Bernardino, California. Moved to Drum Barracks in December, 1863. Moved to Tucson, Arizona Territory in February 1864, then on to Camp Valverde and Fort Craig, New Mexico Territory at the end of March 1864, arriving in April and remaining until moving to Fort Union in August. Moved to Cottonwood Springs in October and returned to Fort Union in December 1864, remaining there until May 1865 when they moved to the Camp near Fort Larned, Kansas where they remained until moving to Camp at Lower Cimarron Springs in August, 1865. They returned to Fort Union November 1865, moving on to Camp Lincoln in December 1865 where they remained until May 1866 when they returned to Fort Union on June 30, 1866. The company assembled at Baird's Ranch, near Albuquerque, to be mustered out of service, during the month of September, 1866.
- Company L: Organized at Camp Union, California, oct 1, 1863. On October 26, Lieutenant Merriam was riding by Cumberland Presbyterian Church when saw a small rebel flag flying from one of the windows. The lieutenant captured the flag and describe it as "... has two red and one' white stripe and seven stars in a field of blue."
- Company M: Organized at Camp Union, California, July 1, 1863. Moved to Tucson via Drum Barracks, in February, 1864. At Camp Goodwin, Arizona Territory March 31, 1864. In Las Cruces, New Mexico from April to October, 1864, then moved to Hatch's Ranch, New Mexico. Moved to Camp at Blue Water Creek in November, 1864 and participated in the "Kiowa and Comanche Expedition," near Fort Bascom, New Mexico in December, 1864. It then returned to Las Cruces in January, remaining until May 1865 when they moved to Fort Selden, then Fort Craig in June, returning to Fort Selden until September 1866 when it moved to Baird's Ranch to muster out on September 30, 1866. It was the last company of the regiment to be mustered out.

== See also ==
- List of California Civil War Union units

== Sources ==
- The California State Military Museum; 1st Regiment of Cavalry, California Volunteers
- Records of California men in the war of the rebellion 1861 to 1867 By California. Adjutant General's Office, SACRAMENTO: State Office, J. D. Young, Supt. State Printing. 1890. pp.68-167
- All Known Battles & Skirmishes During the American Civil War - New Mexico Territory
