= Lee Warne =

American politician and rancher (1922–2002)

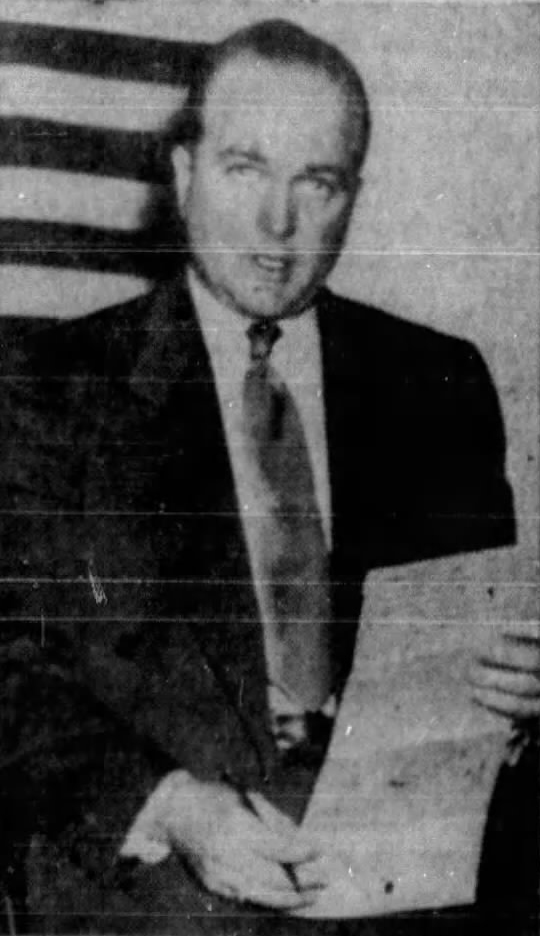
- Warne in 1955

Member of the South Dakota House of Representatives from the 22nd district
- In office 1957–1958
- Preceded by: J. C. Noonan

Member of the South Dakota Senate from the 16th district
- In office 1953–1956
- Preceded by: Fred R. Winans

Personal details
- Born: Leland DeWayne Warne; January 1, 1922 Pierre, South Dakota, U.S.
- Died: March 8, 2002 (aged 80) Scottsdale, Arizona, U.S.
- Party: Republican
- Spouse: Helen Williams (m. 1945)
- Children: 4 (Note: Two children died as infants.)
- Education: University of South Dakota (BA)
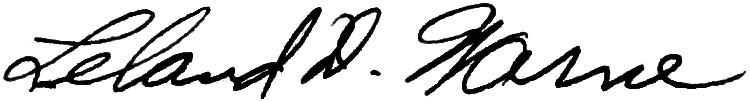
- Signature

Leland DeWayne Warne (January 1, 1922 – March 8, 2002) was an American politician and rancher from South Dakota. Born in Pierre, he received a Bachelor of Arts from the University of South Dakota before serving in the United States Army for several years, where he fought in the European theatre of World War II and received both a Bronze Star Medal and Purple Heart. Warne was elected to the South Dakota Senate as a member of the Republican Party in 1952; he won re-election in 1954. He ran for the South Dakota House of Representatives in 1956, defeating the incumbent J. C. Noonan in a close race. Following his legislatorial stint, he bred horses on his ranch. In 1988, Warne was inducted into the South Dakota Hall of Fame. He died in Scottsdale, Arizona, in 2002 at the age of 80.

== Early life ==
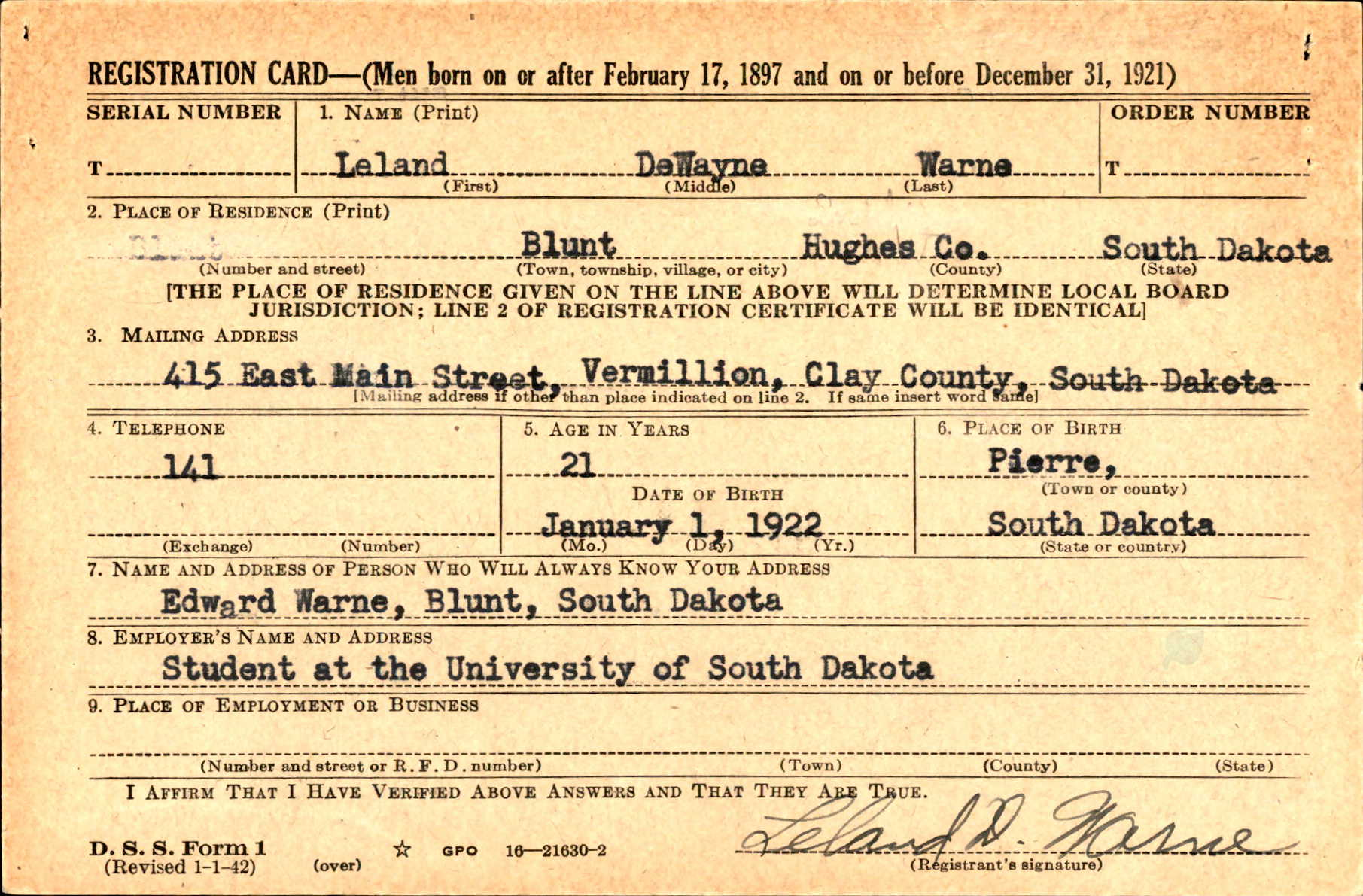
Warne's World War II draft registration card

Leland DeWayne Warne was born in Pierre, South Dakota, on January 1, 1922, to ranchers Edward and Lona (née Yung) Warne. He was educated at Goodwater rural school in Sully County and graduated from Pierre High School in 1939. After receiving a Bachelor of Arts from the University of South Dakota, Warne reported to an officer candidate school in Fort Knox, Kentucky, and served nearly 4 years as a platoon leader and company commander. During the European theatre of World War II, he served in both the 2nd Armored Division as a first lieutenant and the 20th Armored Division. Warne received a Bronze Star Medal and Purple Heart for his service. After his return to the United States in 1945, he married nurse Helen Williams. Together, they had four children, only two of which survived past infancy: Randy and Nancy.

== Political career ==
After Warne was discharged from the military, he served on the board of the Goodwater School for 22 years and as a Sully County commissioner for 21 years. On February 14, 1952, he announced his campaign for the South Dakota Senate, seeking the Republican Party nomination for the 16th district. The announcement came the day after the incumbent senator, Fred R. Winans, stated that he would not seek re-election. Warne officially filed for election on May 1, defeating fellow Republicans Arthur B. Cahalan of Miller and G. C. Reynolds of Blunt in the primary election. Because there was no Democratic Party opponent in the general election, Warne won unopposed by default. He comfortably won a re-election bid in 1954, defeating his Democratic opponent, Nick Jackus, by nearly 19 points. As senator, Warne was the chairman of Military and Veterans' Affairs. In 1955, he proposed a constitutional amendment that would have reduced the state's voting age to 18.

Warne ran for the South Dakota House of Representatives in 1956, seeking to represent its 22nd district. In a close race, he defeated the incumbent, Democrat J. C. Noonan, by 12 votes. Noonan petitioned for a recount, which showed him leading Warne by 6 votes, which was contested and brought to the South Dakota Supreme Court by Warne, who requested that they review the challenged or thrown-out ballots. A writ of certiorari was filed at the Supreme Court on December 8, and the case hearing was scheduled for December 17. The court ended up rigorously examining 93 ballots, ruling that Warne had won the race, albeit with a very tight margin of just 3 votes. As representative, Warne introduced a bill that would have broadened the state's sales tax base to include hotels and motels. He was a delegate to the 1956 Republican National Convention.

=== Electoral history ===
1952 South Dakota Senate 16th district election
Primary election
Party	Candidate	Votes	%
Republican	Lee Warne	2,554	54.51%
Republican	G. C. Reynolds	1,276	27.24%
Republican	Arthur B. Cahalan	855	18.25%
Total votes		4,685	100.00%
General election
Republican	Lee Warne	7,408	100.00%
Total votes		7,408	100.00%

1954 South Dakota Senate 16th district general election
Party	Candidate	Votes	%
Republican	Lee Warne	5,201	59.47%
Democratic	Nick Jackus	3,545	40.53%
Total votes		8,746	100.00%

== Ranching career and later life ==
In 1957, Warne began breeding Appaloosa horses on his ranch as a hobby. His ranch, established in 1904, was located roughly 20 miles northwest of Pierre and was approximately 8,500 acres (3,400 ha; 13.3 sq mi; 34 km^{2}) in size. Five national-championship winning Appaloosa horses were bred on his ranch. In 1961, Warne served as co-chair of the 45-member University of South Dakota Development Commission. In 1972, Warne was appointed by Earl Butz, the United States secretary of agriculture, to serve on the 19-member Water Bank Advisory Board.

In 1973, Warne's ranch won the South Dakota State Izaak Walton League Award for outstanding wildlife habitat management. In 1988, he was inducted into the South Dakota Hall of Fame in the agriculture category. Warne died in Scottsdale, Arizona, on March 8, 2002. He was buried at Riverside Cemetery in Pierre.
