= Arthur Amiotte =

Native American painter

Arthur Douglas Amiotte
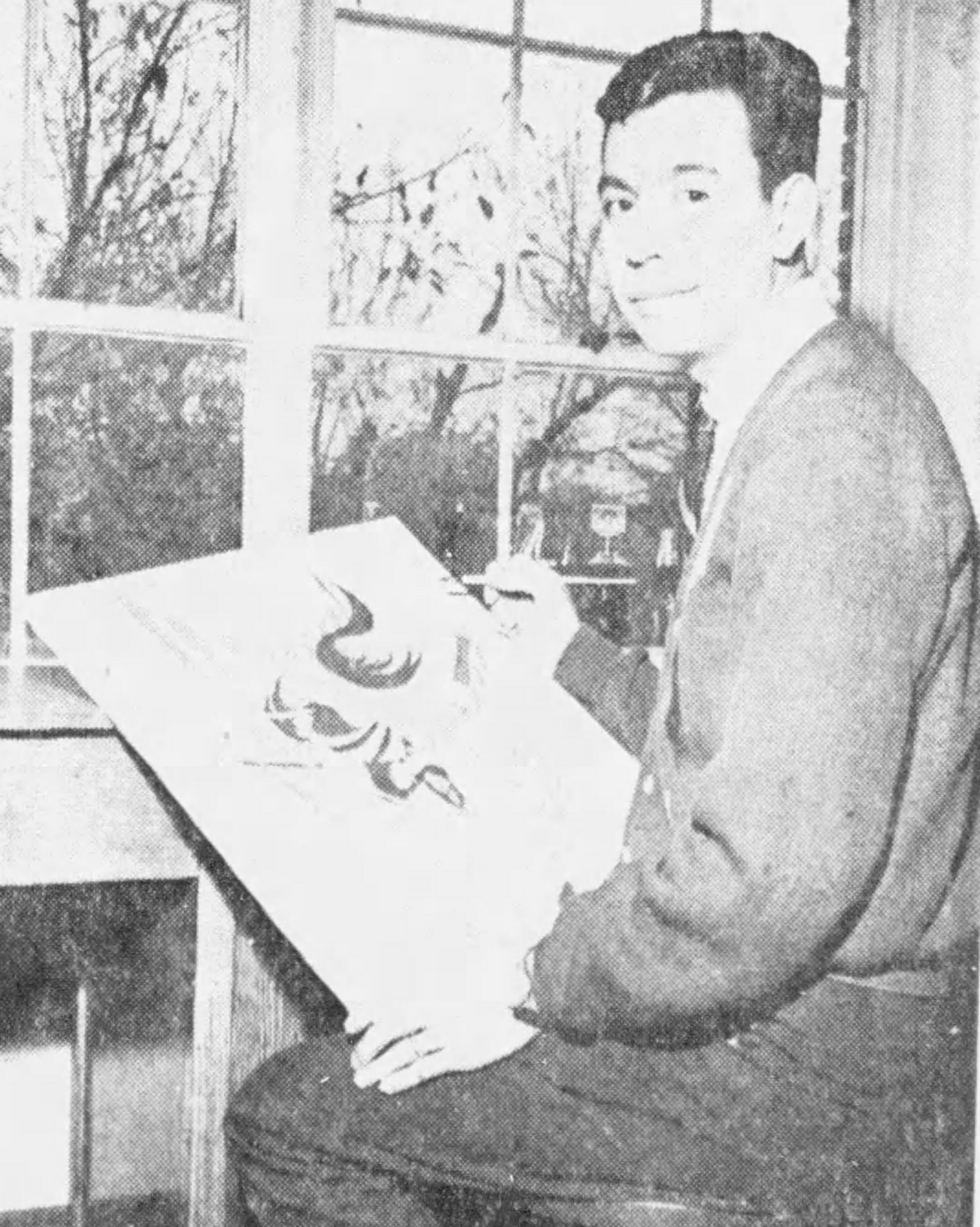
- Arthur Amiotte, 1965.jpg
- Born: Wanblí Ta Hócoka Washté; March 25, 1942 (age 84); Pine Ridge, South Dakota
- Education: BA Northern State University
- Known for: collage, printmaking, painting
- Awards: Bush Leadership Fellow, South Dakota Governor’s Award for Outstanding Creative Achievement in Arts

Arthur Douglas Amiotte (Waŋblí Ta Hóčhoka Wašté or Good Eagle Center) (born 1942) is an Oglala Lakota Native American painter, collage artist, educator, and author.

== Biography ==
Arthur Amiotte was born on March 25, 1942, in Pine Ridge, South Dakota, on the Pine Ridge Indian Reservation. He was given the name Warpa Tanka Kuciyela or Low Black Bird as an infant, but received his second Lakota name in 1972. Amiotte's parents are Walter Douglas Amiotte and Olive Louise Mesteth. One of his aunts is Lakota artist Emma E. Amiotte. His great-grandfather Standing Bear (1859–1933) was at the Battle of Little Big Horn. Amiotte lived in the reservation until he was six and then visited it during summers up to the age of 15.

During his studies at Northern State University in Aberdeen, South Dakota, Amiotte attended a workshop from Oscar Howe in 1961. From this encounter, Amiotte got a concrete example of how a native artist can be a contemporary artist. Amiotte received his bachelor's degree in Art and Art Education and was subsequently a teacher at Woodrow Wilson Junior High School in Sioux City from 1964 to 1966.

Two mentors, in particular, guided Amiotte. From 1969 to 1975, his grandmother Christina Standing Bear, a sacred bundle keeper, taught him the heritage of his great-grandfather Standing Bear (Mató Nájin), who illustrated Black Elk Speaks. From 1972 to 1981, Amiotte was influenced by the Lakota medicine man Pete Catches (Oglala Lakota), who introduced Amiotte to Lakota spirituality and rituals belonging to Lakota traditions.

He received his Masters of Interdisciplinary Studies in 1983 from the University of Montana-Missoula.

Amiotte was professor of Native American art history at Brandon University, Manitoba, but in 1985, he decided to dedicate himself to art and he established his studio in Custer, South Dakota, in 1986.

Amiotte curated exhibitions about the culture of the tribes on the Great Plains, such as at the Wheelwright Museum of the American Indian in Santa Fe, New Mexico; the Akta Lakota Museum in Chamberlain, South Dakota; the Buffalo Bill Historical Center of Cody, Wyoming; and the Museum of World Cultures of Frankfurt am Main, Germany, in 2006. In 2004, Arthur Amiotte lectured an Oscar Howe Memorial Lecture

== Works ==
=== Main exhibitions and artworks ===
Lakota philosophy and oral history form the foundation of Amiotte's artistic work. His creativity as a whole is an expression of the Lakól wicóh'an washtélaka – the love of the Lakota traditions. Amiotte promotes Lakota rituals and the visionary experiences during the traditional ceremonies also find their impact on his artistic work.

Amiotte defines his work as being bound to the reservation culture which bridges the gap between yesterday and today, a split which is often mastered in an amazing manner. Amiotte has said, "I realized that contemporary art was ignoring the whole reservation period. This had been a dynamic time. Some people were going to school in the east, to Carlisle and Hampton... People were moving onto land allotments. They were familiar with print media, exposed to lots of magazines, pictures, photographs... Daily life was infused with this mixture of nonliterate/literate. There were new technologies... it seemed to me that it was more honest to deal with all this in my art, rather than to create a fake hide painting."

His collage work is inspired by Ledger art but takes it to a new level. In a pointed and sharp-witted manner, they reveal the discrepancy of Lakota culture between tradition and modernism ("The Visit," 1995, Acrylic-Collage; Buffalo Bill Historical Center, Wyoming). He also explores experiences of Lakota people in Europe, during the Wild West show era of the early 20th century.

Amiotte has participated in over 100 exhibitions, including over 20 solo exhibitions. He has shown throughout the United States and Europe, including at the Kunsthallen Bradts Klaedefabrik in Odense, Denmark in 1994 and 1995.

His work, ranging from painting to sculpture and textile objects, is present in 26 public and about 200 private collections. His work is included in such public collections as the Denver Art Museum, the Sequoyah National Research Center in Little Rock, Arkansas, the National Museum of Natural History, as well as the following institutions.

The Minneapolis Institute of Arts, The Ethel Morrison Van Derlip Fund

- Prince Albert, 1989, Collage and acrylic on canvas
- 1913 Spring/Summer 1913- Giving Away His Suit, 1990

Joslyn Art Museum

- New Horse Power in 1913, 1994, acrylic and collage on canvas

Hood Museum of Art

- "Saint Agnes" Manderson, S.D. Pine Ridge Rez, 2001, Acrylic and collage on canvas, Purchased through the Phyllis and Bertram Geller 1937 Memorial Fund

Whitney Gallery of Western Art

- The Visitors from Oklahoma, 1996, Collage and acrylic

=== Publications and lectures ===
He frequently lectures at home and abroad and is a published author. In 1989 Amiotte wrote with a chapter about Sioux Arts in the important volume, Illustrated History of the Arts in South Dakota, published during the state's centennial.

- Amiotte, Arthur (1987). The Lakota Sun Dance - Historical and Contemporary Perspectives, in: Sioux Indian Religion. Raymond J. DeMaillie/Douglas R. Parks, Norman.
- Amiotte, Arthur (1989). Eagles Fly Over, sowie: Our Other Selves, in: I Become Part of It - Sacred Dimensions in Native American Life. New York: D.M. Dooling/Paul Jordan-Smith.
- Amiotte, Arthur; Runnels, Vic. Art and Indian Children of the Dakotas, Book Five - An Introduction to Art and Other Ideas. Washington/BIA Aberdeen S.D., o.J.
- Indian Arts and Crafts Board of the U.S. Department of the Interior, Photographs and Poems by Sioux Children, from the Pine Ridge Indian Reservation, South Dakota, selected by Myles Libhart and Arthur Amiotte, with an essay by Arthur Amiotte, Rapid City 1971.

== Honors ==
From 1979 to 1981, Amiotte served on the Presidential Advisory Council for the Performing Arts in Washington, D.C. In 1980, he was awarded the South Dakota Governor's Award for Outstanding Creative Achievement in Arts. That same year, Amiotte was awarded the Bush Leadership Fellowship, which allowed him to study Northern Plains art collections in the United States and Europe at the University of Montana-Missoula.

Amiotte received the Getty Foundation Grant in 1994 and 1995 and the Lila Wallace Reader's Digest Artists at Giverny Fellowship in 1997.

In 1999, he was awarded the Lifetime Achievement Award as Artist and Scholar by the Native American Art Studies Association.

Arthur Amiotte holds honorary doctorates from the Oglala Lakota College and the Brandon University, Manitoba.

== Bibliography ==
- Berlo, Janet Catherine (2000). Spirit beings and sun dancers: Black Hawk's vision of the Lakota world. George Braziller, in association with the New York State Historical Association. p. 190. ISBN 0-8076-1465-3.
- National Museum of the American Indian (U.S.) (1994). This path we travel: celebrations of contemporary Native American creativity. National Museum of the American Indian, Smithsonian Institution, and Fulcrum Pub. p. 126. ISBN 978-1-55591-205-5.
- "Giveaway for the Gods: An Interview with Arthur Amiotte". Parabola: The Magazine of Myth and Tradition. 15:4 (Winter): 38–49. 1990. ISSN 0362-1596.
- Loeb, Barbara (1985). "Arthur Amiotte's banners". American Indian Art Magazine. 10 (2 (spring 1985)): 54–59. ISSN 0192-9968. OCLC 43941620.
- Vigil, Jennifer Claire. "Drawing Past, Present and Future: The Legacy of the Plains Indian Graphic Tradition in the Works of Arthur Amiotte." Ph D Dissertation, University of Iowa, 2004
- Warren, Louis S. (2005). "Standing Bear". Buffalo Bill's America: William Cody and the Wild West Show. Alfred A. Knopf. p. 396. ISBN 978-0-375-41216-5.

=== Museums and exhibitions catalogs ===
- "Arthur Amiotte: Collages, 1988-2006 - November 19, 2006-April 29, 2007". Wheelwright Museum of the American Indian. Archived from the original on September 8, 2008.
- "Picturing Change: The Impact of Ledger Drawings on Native American Art - December 11, 2004 - May 15, 2005". The Hood Museum of Art at Dartmouth College.
- Amiotte, Arthur; Berlo, Janet Catherine (2006). Arthur Amiotte: collages, 1988 - 2006. Santa Fe: Wheelwright Museum of the American Indian. p. 97. ISBN 978-0-9622777-5-7.
- "Arthur Amiotte Retrospective: Continuity and Diversity - August 18 - December 31, 2002". Buffalo Bill Historical Center. Archived from the original on 2002-06-17.
- Amiotte, Arthur; Day, John A. (2001). Arthur Amiotte: retrospective exhibition, continuity and diversity. The Heritage Center. pp. 42. OCLC 50021499.
- "The Fenimore Art Museum Receives an Important Collection of Native American Art and Two New Acquisitions". Fenimore Art Museum. 9 March 2007. Archived from the original on 2009-09-24.
