= Adams Museum & House =

History museum in Deadwood, South Dakota

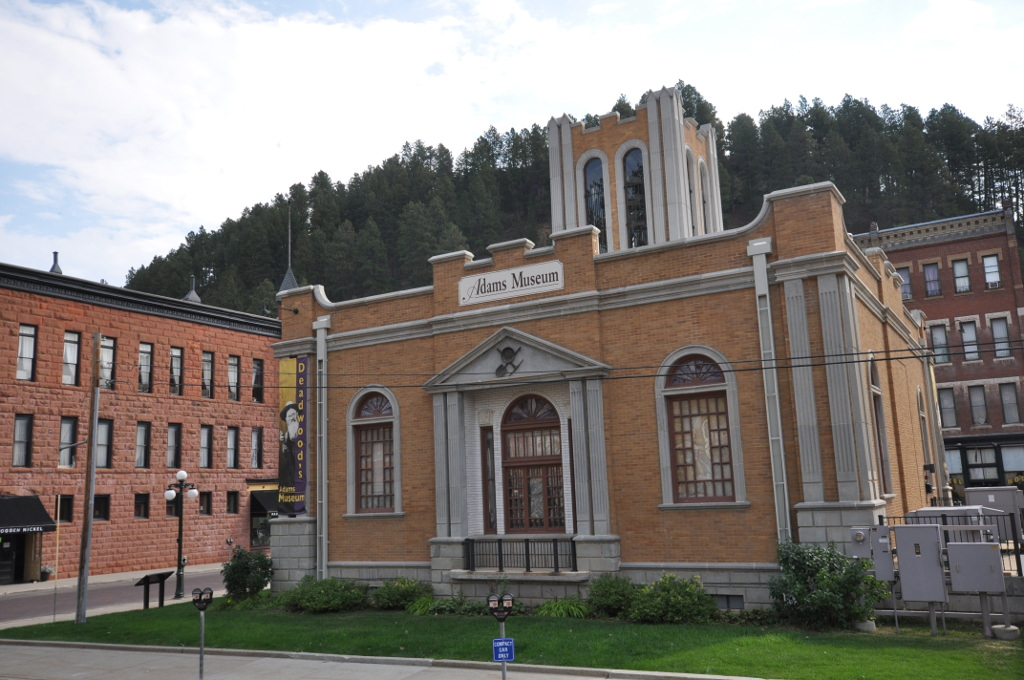
- Adams Museum in 2017
- Established: 1930
- Location: 54 Sherman St., Deadwood, South Dakota
- Coordinates: 44°22′33″N 103°43′46″W
- Type: History
- Founder: W.E. Adams
- President: Phyllis Fleming
- Website: www.deadwoodhistory.com/about-us/properties/historic-adams-house/

The Adams Museum & House in Deadwood, South Dakota is the Black Hills' oldest history museum. Artifacts on display reflect the legends of Wild Bill, Calamity Jane, Deadwood Dick, and the Black Hills gold rush. The museum is open year-round and features changing exhibits and special programs. It was founded by Deadwood businessman and former mayor W.E. Adams in 1930. The museum was a gift to the city of Deadwood and it remains city property to this day. Among the exhibits are the J.B. Haggin Locomotive, the Thoen Stone, and Potato Creek Johnny's Gold Nugget. It is located at 54 Sherman Street.

The museum was ranked number 3 among True West Magazine's 2009 Top 10 Western Museums. The Adams Museum and House won the Organizational Award of 2001. The same year it also won the Governor's Award for History display at the Cultural Heritage Center in Pierre, South Dakota. In 2005, it won the American Association for State and Local History.

== Historic Adams House ==
The Historic Adams House at 22 Van Buren Avenue (44°22′19.60″N 103°43′36.26″W) was built in 1892 by Deadwood pioneers Harris and Anna Franklin. The Queen Anne style house heralded a wealthy and socially prominent new age for Deadwood, a former rough-and-tumble gold mining town. In 1920, W.E. Adams bought the house as a tribute to the Black Hills pioneers and in remembrance of his deceased first wife, daughter and granddaughter. The Historic Adams House is completely furnished with original Adams family furniture and restored interiors.
