= Camp Carleton =

U.S. Army in California, American Civil War

Coordinates: 34.0715°N 117.2787°W

Camp Carleton was the largest of several military camps to be maintained at various times in the vicinity of San Bernardino. It was established in the fall of 1861 by Captain William A. McCleave and a detachment of the 1st California Cavalry to check any successionist activities in San Bernardino County after they returned from serving at Fort Yuma in the Mojave war. After the camp was flooded in the Great Flood of 1862, the camp's garrison was moved to El Monte, where they established New Camp Carleton.
