= William McCleave =

William A. McCleave
- Born: c. 1822; Ireland
- Died: February 3, 1904 (aged 81–82); Berkeley, California, US
- Burial place: San Francisco National Cemetery
- Military career
- Allegiance: United States; Union
- Branch: United States Army; Union Army
- Service years: 1850–1879
- Rank: Major; Bvt. Lieutenant Colonel
- Units: 1st U.S. Dragoons; U.S. Camel Corps; 8th U.S. Cavalry
- Commands: 1st California Cavalry Regiment
- Conflicts: Indian Wars; American Civil War
- Other work: real estate agent

William A. McCleave (c. 1822 – February 3, 1904) was an Irish-born American soldier and officer in the U.S. Army who served in the Indian Wars and the American Civil War.

== Biography ==
William McCleave was born in Ireland c. 1822. Losing his wife and child in the Great Famine, he immigrated to the United States in 1850. He went to California and enlisted in the 1st U.S. Regiment of Dragoons. He served in Company K under Captain James H. Carleton. Within the next decade he reached the rank of First Sergeant. In 1861, he served as camel herder for the United States Camel Corps and delivered 31 camels from Fort Tejon to Los Angeles.

After the American Civil War began, McCleave was named Colonel and was ordered to recruit a cavalry regiment in California. However, only a battalion of five companies could be organized at that time and he was made a captain in what would eventually become the 1st California Cavalry Regiment instead. He commanded Company A and established Camp Carleton before moving out to Arizona. There, on March 6, 1862, he was captured by Sherod Hunter and his Arizona Rangers. He was exchanged for two lieutenants four months later. He was promoted to major in January 1863 and spent the rest of the war fighting Indians in New Mexico. When it ended, he was a Brevet Lieutenant Colonel and commanded Fort Sumner.

McCleave was mustered out on October 19, 1866; commanding the regiment at that time. Having already accepted a commission in the Regular Army, he therefore became a Second Lieutenant in the 8th U.S. Cavalry. He retired in 1879 as a captain. He had married Marry Crooke in 1872, eventually fathering six children, and after his retirement they settled in Berkeley, California. There he dealt real estate and commanded the Veterans Home of California Yountville. McCleave died on February 3, 1904. He was outlived by his widow, one daughter and his four sons (three of whom also served in the army).
