= Harvey G. Whitlock =

Early Latter Day Saint leader

Harvey Gilman Whitlock (1809–1874) was an early member of the Latter Day Saint movement and one of the eighteen witnesses to the truth of the 1833 Book of Commandments. He was among those Latter Day Saints driven by mobs from Jackson County, Missouri, in the summer of 1833. From 1835 he was in and out of multiple Latter Day Saint churches several times.

== Latter Day Saint church experience ==
Whitlock was a native of Massachusetts. He married Minerva Abbott on November 21, 1830.

He joined Joseph Smith's Church of Christ in 1831 and was an early missionary in Amherst, Ohio. In the church's November 1831 conference Whitlock voted to publish the Book of Commandments, and volunteered to be a witness of its authenticity. His name appears with seventeen other signers. However, this version of the book was never successfully published, as the printing press was destroyed during the expulsion of Mormons from Jackson County, Missouri.

Whitlock was among those who were directed to go to Missouri by a revelation of Smith in June 1832. He later returned to Ohio and then moved his family to Missouri. In 1833 he was viewed as such a leader in the church that he was specifically targeted for early expulsion from Missouri.

In 1835, Whitlock was excommunicated. On September 28, 1835, he sent a letter expressing repentance to Smith:

Dear brother Joseph … when I consider the happy times and peaceful moments, and pleasant seasons I have enjoyed with you, and this people; contrasted with my now degraded state; together with the high, and important station I have held before God and the abyss into which I have fallen, is a subject that swells, my heart too big for utterance.

To which Smith replied upon receipt of the letter on November 16:

let it suffice, that I say the very flood-gates of my heart were broken up: I could not refrain from weeping, I thank God, that it has entered into your heart, to try to return to the Lord, and to his people; if it so be, that he will have mercy upon you. I have inquired of the Lord concerning your case, these words came to me: "Verily thus saith the Lord unto you; let him who was my servant Harvey, return unto me;— and unto the bosom of my Church, and forsake all the sins wherewith he has offended against me and pursue from hence forth a virtuous and upright life...

Smith directed Whitlock to come to Kirtland, Ohio, and in January 1836, Whitlock was rebaptized at Kirtland and restored to his priesthood. However, Whitlock again withdrew from the church in 1838.

In 1846, he became a member of Sidney Rigdon's church. By 1850, Whitlock was in Salt Lake City, but there is no record of his having been joined the Utah-based Church of Jesus Christ of Latter-day Saints (LDS Church) until 1858. Whitlock was excommunicated by the LDS Church in 1859. In 1864, Whitlock moved to California, where he became the head of the Pacific Slope Region of the Reorganized Church of Jesus Christ of Latter Day Saints (RLDS Church). In 1868, Whitlock was excommunicated by the RLDS Church.

David Whitmer, an original witness of the golden plates and later president of the Church of Christ (Whitmerite), claimed in his 1887 pamphlet "An Address to All Believers in Christ" that in 1831 the devil caught Whitlock, contorting his features, after he was ordained to be a high priest to show "God's displeasure was upon their works".
