= Post at Grand River Indian Agency =

Coordinates: 44°27′04″N 100°24′08″W

Post at Grand River Indian Agency was a Federal military post at the Grand River Indian Agency between 1870 and 1875 in the Dakota Territory. It was located at the Missouri and Grand Rivers, near modern Wakpala, Corson County, South Dakota within the Standing Rock Sioux Reservation.

Periodic flooding forced the transfer of the Indian Agency and the garrison to Fort Yates in North Dakota. The site is now underwater beneath Lake Oahe.
