= Black Hills gold rush =

19th-Century Gold Rush in Dakota Territory, USA

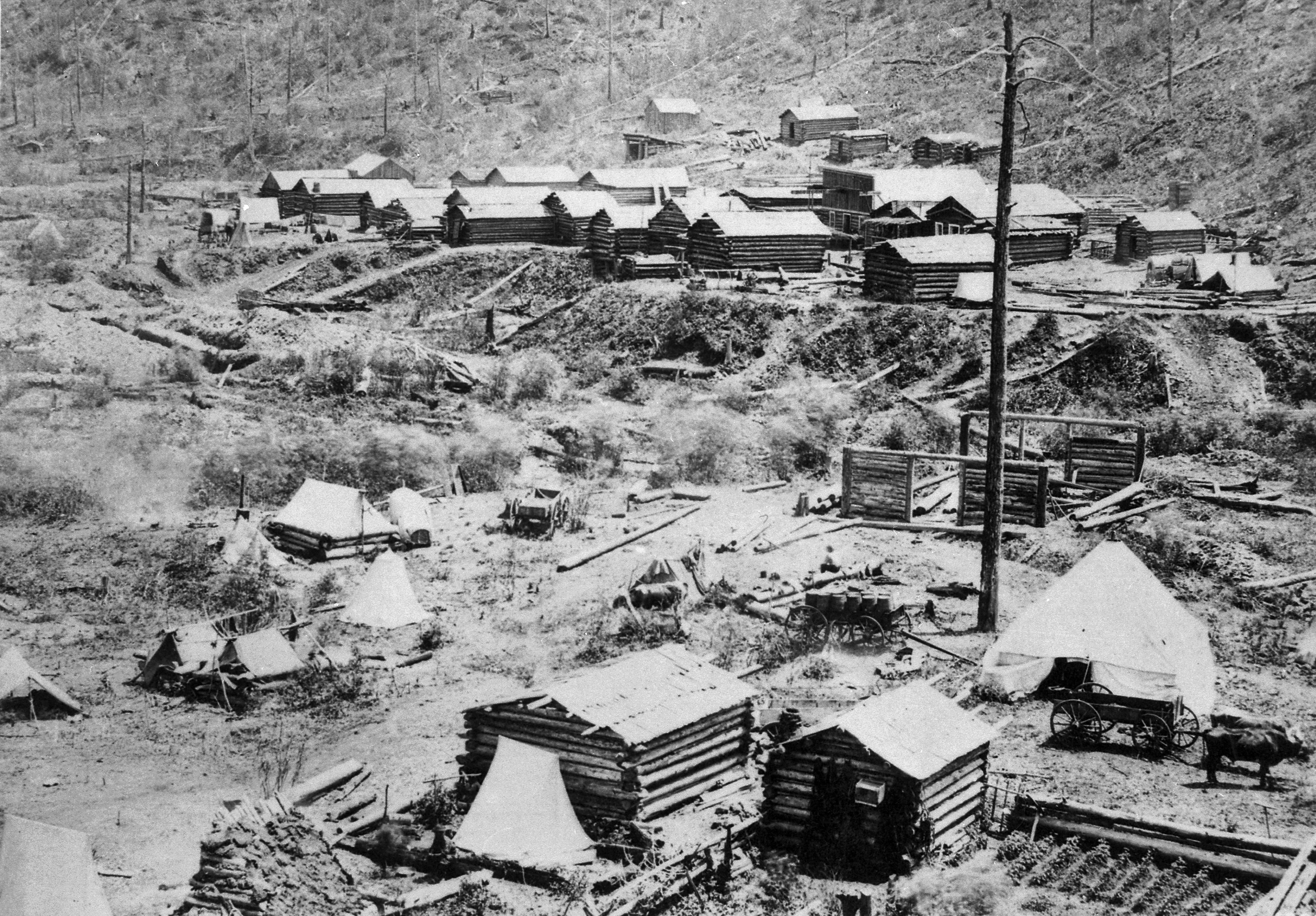
- Gayville, an early placer mining camp, 1876
- Date: 1874–1879
- Location: Black Hills in Dakota Territory; 44°21′N 103°45′W
- Type: Gold rush

The Black Hills gold rush took place in Dakota Territory in the United States. It began in 1874 following the Custer Expedition and reached a peak in 1876–77.

Rumors and poorly documented reports of gold in the Black Hills go back to the early 19th century. In the 1860s, Roman Catholic missionary Father De Smet is reported to have seen Sioux Indians carrying gold which they told him came from the Black Hills.

Prior to the gold rush, the Black Hills were used by Native Americans (primarily bands of Sioux but others also ranged through the area). The United States government recognized the Black Hills as belonging to the Sioux by the Treaty of Laramie in 1868. Despite being within Native American territory, and therefore off-limits, white Americans were increasingly interested in the gold-mining possibilities of the Black Hills.

Prospectors found gold in 1874 near present-day Custer, South Dakota, but the deposit turned out to be small. The large placer gold deposits of Deadwood Gulch were discovered in November 1875, and in 1876, thousands of gold-seekers flocked to the new town of Deadwood, although it was still within Native American land.

The tale of first gold discovery in the Black Hills was thrown into question in 1887 by the discovery of what has become known as the Thoen Stone. Discovered by Louis Thoen on the slopes of Lookout Mountain, the stone purports to be the last testament of Ezra Kind who, along with six others, entered the Black Hills in 1833 (at a time when whites were forbidden by law and treaty from entering the area), "got all the gold we could carry" in June 1834, and were subsequently "killed by Indians beyond the high hill". While it may seem unlikely that someone who has "lost my gun and nothing to eat and Indians hunting me" would take the time to carve his story in sandstone, there is corroborating historical evidence for the Ezra Kind party.

Many of the miners came up the Missouri River from Kansas and eventually returned there.

== Background ==
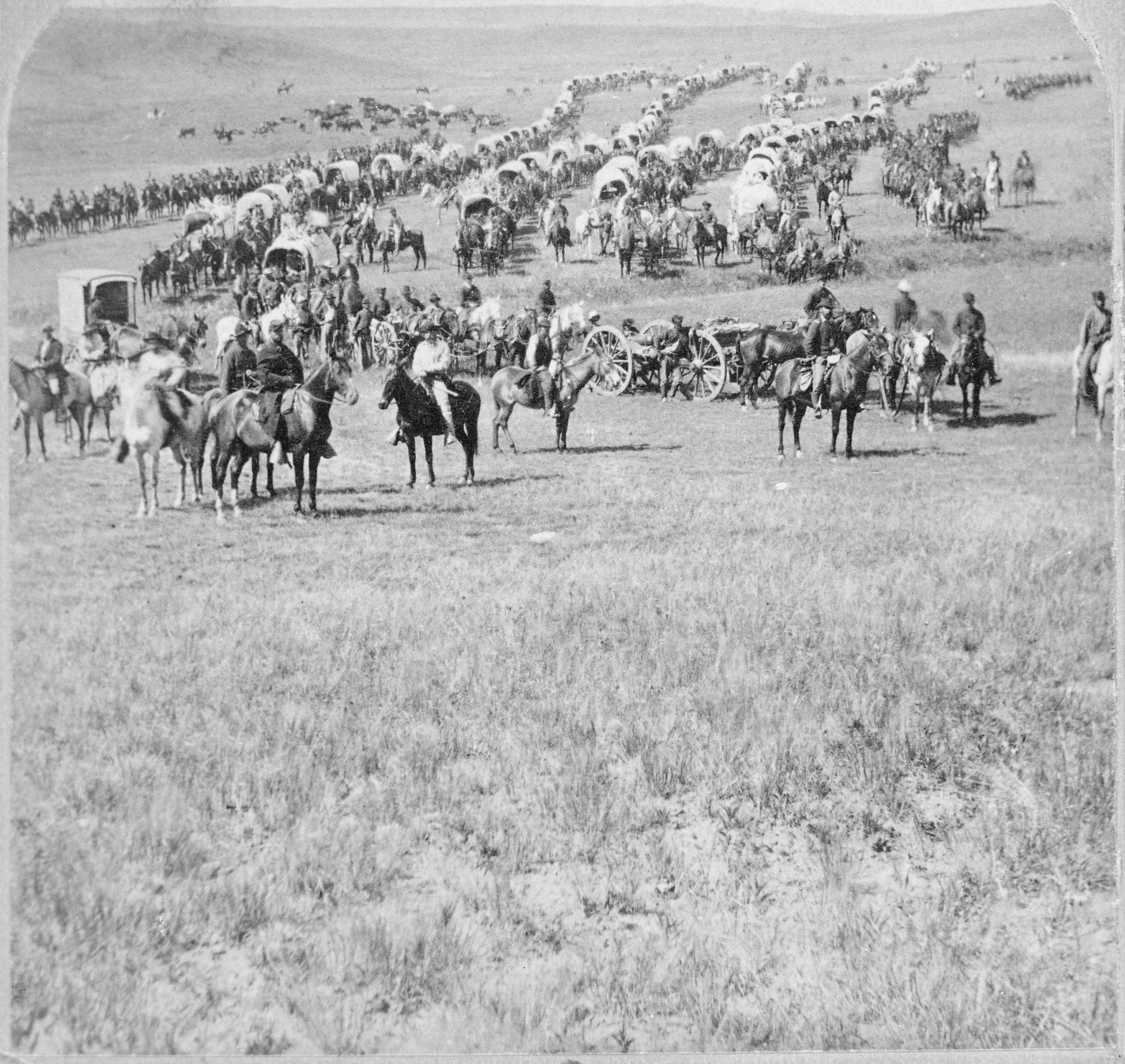
Custer's Black Hills Expedition

The Black Hills gold rush began in 1874. The first arrivals were a force of 1,000 men led by George Armstrong Custer to investigate reports that the area contained gold, even though the land was owned by the Sioux. They found small amounts of gold in present-day Custer, South Dakota, and looked for better-paying locations. They moved north, establishing the towns of Hill City, Sheridan, and Pactola. At each spot, they found flakes of gold, but not the bonanza they sought. Things changed when the miners stumbled across Deadwood and Whitewood Creeks in the northern Black Hills. For the initial discoverers, each spade of earth revealed a veritable fortune in gold.

== History ==
By 1876, miners had claimed all the land around the creeks. Although all the land was claimed, thousands more flocked in, hoping to find a missed spot. The gold the miners had found was placer gold, loose gold pieces that were mixed in with the rocks and soil around streams.

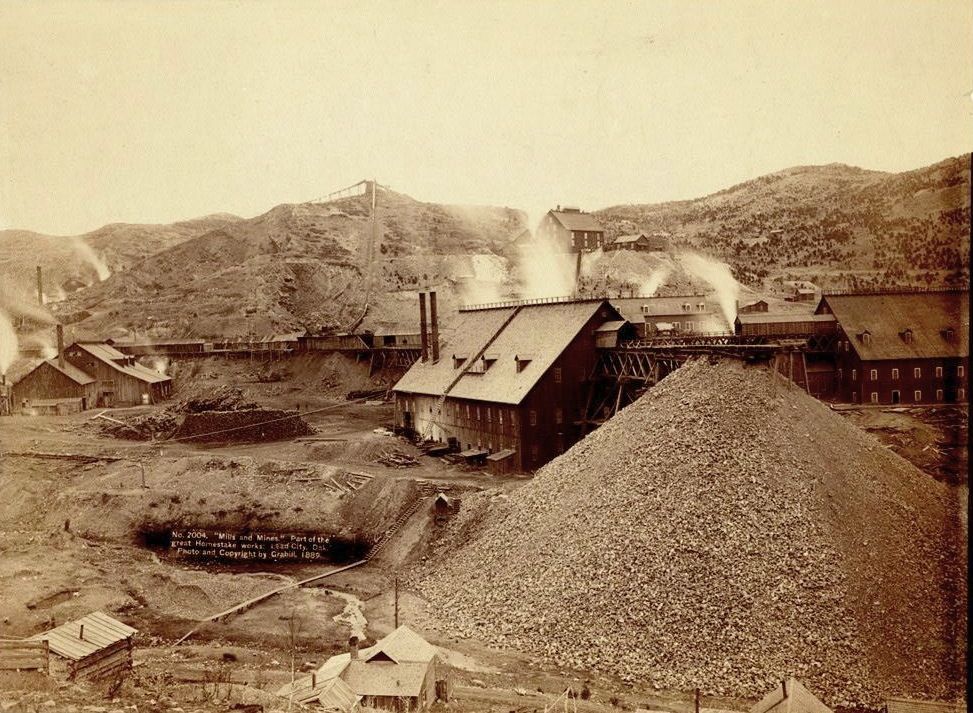
The Homestake Mine in 1889

Most good prospectors knew that this placer gold was eroded from hard-rock deposits. So while many still flocked to Deadwood, others looked for the hard-rock deposits that were the source of the placer gold. On April 9, 1876, Fred and Moses Manuel, Hank Harney and Alex Engh discovered a gold outcropping near Lead, South Dakota; they claimed their find and named it the Homestake. They had located the area from which the placer gold in Deadwood Creek had eroded. Here, the men produced 10% of the world's gold supply over the next 125 years. Many more prospectors hoped to find another "Homestake" so they continued to look, but the Homestake mine was unique.

The workers crushed the rock to release the gold, concentrated the gold by gravity methods, and then exposed the concentrate to mercury that would amalgamate or mix with the gold. Miners call this kind of gold extraction free milling. Gold existed elsewhere in the Black Hills, but it was not in a state suitable for free-milling. In these conditions, gold was chemically bound to the rock, and very difficult to remove. It was called refractory gold ore. For many years, the Homestake operated as the only major gold mine in the Black Hills. Chlorization and smelting were seen as two methods that could remove gold from the refractory ore in the 1890s. More rock mining regions opened up around Lead and Deadwood because of this discovery.

During the gold rush, "Treasure Coaches" transporting large quantities of the precious metal worth up to $300,000 on each haul to Cheyenne, Wyoming, became a favorite target for road agents. The last recorded hold-up occurred around 3:00 pm on September 26, 1878, at the Canyon Springs station, about 35 miles south of Deadwood. The robbers bound and gagged the stableman and lined the stable wall with their guns through cracks between the logs. As the coach approached the station, the desperadoes opened fire. One guard was killed, and two guards were wounded. The chief guard took cover behind a large pine tree, exchanged a few shots with the bandits, and got them to agree to let him go if he would leave the coach with them. After he left, the outlaws tied the driver to one of the coach's wheels, opened the safe with a sledge hammer and chisels, divided the loot, and rode off in different directions. Aroused citizens in the area organized manhunts, and the stage company offered a $2,500 reward. Several suspects were lynched, others were convicted at trial on various counts, and more than half of the gold was eventually recovered.

== In popular culture ==
The Black Hills gold rush forms the background of the HBO series Deadwood.

== See also ==
- Black Hills gold jewelry
- California gold rush
