= Mollie Johnson =

19th-century madam in Deadwood, South Dakota

Mollie Johnson was a 19th-century madam in Deadwood, South Dakota. Johnson was born in Alabama, and migrated west in response to the demand for working prostitutes. Indications are that she began working that trade in her early teens, around the age of 15 or 16 by some reports. However, definite information on her early life is unconfirmed.

She first appeared in Deadwood shortly after the gold rush, and was first mentioned in public writing in February 1878, when she married Lew Spencer, an African American comedian who was performing at the time in the Bella Union Theater. Although married, Johnson continued to work in her chosen profession, both as prostitute and madam.

Reportedly a widow before her arrival in Deadwood, and in her early to mid-20s, Johnson was described as being a pretty woman, and a very good businesswoman. She was also a known supporter of Irish Famine Relief. The competition for brothel owners in Deadwood was light, as there were very few girls to choose from, but plenty of men. Her main competition during most of her time in Deadwood was Madam Dora DuFran, but there is no indication that the two madams did not get along.

Spencer eventually left Deadwood and was later arrested in Denver, Colorado, for shooting his other wife. Evidently Spencer had been married to both a woman in Denver, and Johnson. There are no indications that Johnson and Spencer ever saw one another afterwards.

The brothel houses were described in the papers as being a resort for "naughty men". Mollie Johnson was noted to be of a kind heart, caring for the dead body of one of her girls, then trying to save her possessions in the "Big Deadwood Fire" of September 26, 1879.

After the destruction of the brothel, which stood on the corner of Sherman and Lee Streets, she immediately opened another brothel, and suffered two more fires over the course of the years. She reportedly left Deadwood, as business dropped off, in January 1883. Where she went or what happened to her following her departure of Deadwood is unknown.
