= Jerry Bryant =

Jerry Bryant may refer to:

- Jerry Bryant, a member of blackface minstrel group, Bryant's Minstrels
- Jerry Bryant (songwriter), American songwriter and folk musician specializing in 19th-century sea music
- Jerry Bryant (historian) (1945–2015), American historian, an expert on Deadwood, South Dakota
- Jerry Bryant, host and creator of JBTV, Chicago-based alternative TV show
- James Bryant (Australian cricketer) (1826–1881), nicknamed Jerry, Australian cricketer and influential Australian rules footballer
