= Mary McLaughlin =

Mary McLaughlin may refer to:

- Mary A. McLaughlin (born 1946), American judge
- Mary Ann McLaughlin (born 1968), American cardiologist
- Mary C. McLaughlin (died 2014), American public health official
- Mary Louise McLaughlin (1847–1939), American ceramics painter and potter
- Mary McLaughlin Craig (1889–1964), American architect
- Mary McLaughlin, 1957 Vogue cover model
- Mary McLaughlin (musician), artist with Gourd Music

== See also ==
- Mary McLoughlin (1901–1956), Irish rebel
