= Kitty Leroy =

American saloon owner

An 1878 engraving of Kitty Leroy.

Kitty Leroy (c. 1850 – December 6, 1877) was a dancer, gambler, and performer who lived in Deadwood, famous city of the American Old West, at the time of her death. She was murdered by her estranged husband in December 1877.

== Biography ==
Leroy's place of birth is unknown, though some sources suggest Michigan. Some reports, written after her death, claimed that she had begun dancing professionally by the age of 10.

Early in her life, Kitty apparently married a man named Captain E.H. Lewis of Bay City, Michigan. Tiring of the marriage, she left for the stage, and her name appears in newspaper advertisements from 1872 onwards, as she toured the country, performing as a jig and clog dancer.

Her touring took her to Texas, where she met a man known as Raymond; for the next 6 years they live together, during which time Kitty appears to have continued occasionally touring and performing.

In the hectic world of touring, Kitty sometimes made the news for exploits of a less-artistic kind. In October 1876, for instance, the Eureka Daily Sentinel reported on a tussle between Kitty and her current performing partner. Maggie Kelly and Kitty did a clog-dancing double act. After one performance, at the Alhambra Theater in Virginia City, they got into a physical fight in the green room, with Kitty noted as throwing a bottle of black varnish amidst the altercation. Professional jealousies along with more fiscal matters - namely a disagreement over commissions from the sale of wine - apparently precipitated the fisticuffs.

Kitty and Raymond eventually travelled to California and then, in early 1877, to the Black Hills region. Once in Black Hills, Kitty and Raymond split up.

Kitty kept a saloon in Central City for a time, then moved to Deadwood, where she operated a gambling den, The Mint. Contrary to legend, there is no evidence that she ever traveled with Calamity Jane or other famous wild west figures.

Kitty Leroy, in addition to her renown as a performer, was a skilled with cards. In particular, she was a faro dealer, and many gamblers patronized The Mint. Kitty's beauty and charisma were also well known, and attracted many.

While in the Black Hills region, after she and Raymond were estranged, she met Sam Curley. Kitty and Curley were married in June 1877 shortly after meeting. Their union was officiated by a Justice of the Peace on the stage of the Gem Theater.

The marriage, however, (which may have been bigamous, based on Kitty's Michigan marriage to Captain Lewis) quickly proved an unhappy one. Curley left for a different town, related as Cheyenne or Sidney in different tellings. In his absence Kitty and her long time previous partner, Raymond, reconciled. Curley apparently found out and, two days before the murder, traveling under a fake name, he came back to Deadwood.

He set himself up in the bar of the Lone Star Saloon. First, he sent for Raymond, demanding they meet, but Raymond refused. At some point, Curley allegedly told an employee of the Lone Star that he would kill Kitty and then himself.

According to an inquest held in the wake of the events, on the evening before the murder Kitty borrowed money from her landlady to give to Curley, after which he was supposed to leave town and return to Cheyenne. At some point on the day of the murder, Curley sent a message to Kitty saying he wanted to meet. He went to a room on the upper floor of above the Lone Star. Kitty came, and joined him. Witnesses heard the sounds of conversation, then a scream, a gunshot, and another gun shot. Curley had murdered Kitty and then killed himself. Kitty was 28 years old.

A reporter from a local paper described the murder scene, which he saw that very day. In the upstairs room, it was evident Kitty had been shot in the chest, and Curley in the head. Many citizens of the town came to see and pay their respects, viewing the bodies laid out in the same room where the murder had taken place. The town held a funeral, and the two were buried.

Kitty evidently had a child, or possibly two. Some reports state that when she left her first husband, Captain Lewis, she took her son with her, and that this son now resided in Los Angeles.

The murder was widely reported, and Kitty Leroy's life, and death, were mythologized. Legends supposedly relating her actions and wild escapades quickly sprung up, spread, and endured.

There are many stories and legends about Kitty, such as that she was a skilled trick shooter and talented knife-thrower, and that she would dress in unusual, "gypsy-like" clothing.

For instance, one legend claims that, before coming to Black Hills, she and her second husband headed to California, where they hoped to open their own saloon. Somewhere along the line, she left him for another man, marrying for a third time. However, this marriage was extremely short-lived. According to an unconfirmed legend, the two became involved in an argument, during which she challenged him to a gunfight. When he refused to fight her because she was a woman, she changed into men's clothing and challenged him again. When she drew her gun, he did not, and she shot him. As he did not die right away, she called for a preacher and the two were married. He died within a few days.

Another legend states that she married for a fourth time to a Prussian prospector. However, when his money ran out, they began to argue often. She hit him over the head with a bottle one night and threw him out, ending the relationship.

On the night of December 6, 1877, Curley shot and killed Leroy in the Lone Star Saloon, then turned the gun on himself and committed suicide. then buried together.
