= Mary Craig =

Mary Craig may refer to:

- Mary Craig (gothic novelist) (1923–1991), pseudonym of Mary Francis Shura, American children's, romance and mystery writer
- Mary Craig (writer) (1928–2019), British journalist and writer
- Mary Ann Craig (born 1981), British broadcaster and anthropologist
- Mary Craig Sinclair (1882–1961), née Kimbrough (1883–1961), second wife of Upton Sinclair
- Mary Lynde Craig (1834–1921), American writer, teacher, and attorney
- Mary McLaughlin Craig (1889–1964), American architect
- Mary A. Craig, translator of I Malavoglia by Giovanni Verga
- Mary Alice Craig, mother of Marilyn Quayle
- Mary Ann Craig, wife of Joseph Stevenson (1806–1895)
- Mary Jane Craig, mother of George Cary Eggleston (1839–1911)
- Mary "Polly" Craig, wife of Toliver Craig Sr.
- Mary Craig, Miss Arkansas 1966
- Mary Craig, mother of Henry Irwin
