= Mount Moriah Cemetery (South Dakota) =

Cemetery in Deadwood, South Dakota

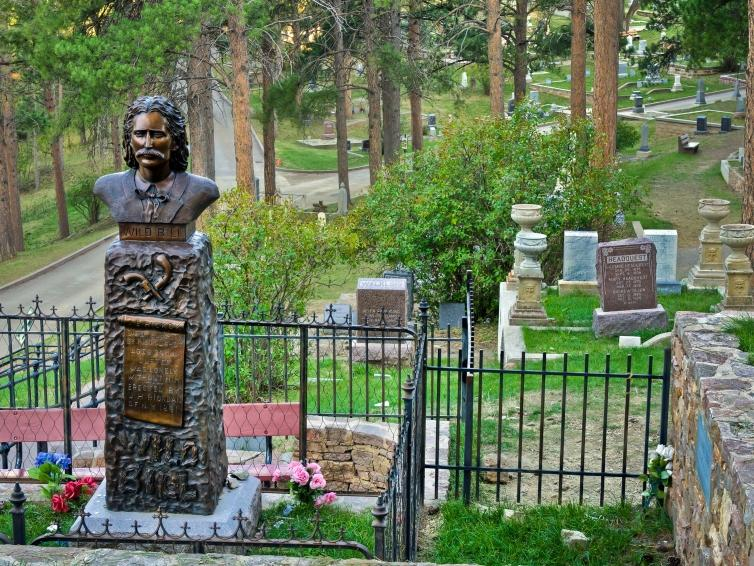
- Wild Bill Hickok's grave overlooking Mount Moriah Cemetery
- Interactive map of Mount Moriah Cemetery

Details
- Established: 1880s
- Location: Deadwood, South Dakota
- Country: United States
- Coordinates: 44.376°N 103.725°W
- Owned by: City of Deadwood
- No. of graves: 3,000+
- Website: Official website
- Find a Grave: Mount Moriah Cemetery

Mount Moriah Cemetery on Mount Moriah in Deadwood, South Dakota, is the burial place of Wild Bill Hickok, Calamity Jane, Seth Bullock and other notable figures of the Wild West.

By tradition, the American flag flies over the cemetery 24 hours a day, rather than merely from sunrise to sunset.

== History ==
In the early years of Deadwood, there were two graveyards: The Ingelside Cemetery, which was part of the way up Mount Moriah and was filled quickly in the first few years it was open, and the Catholic Cemetery. Many prospectors, miners, settlers, prostitutes and children were buried within the Ingelside Cemetery, alongside Wild Bill Hickok and Preacher Smith.

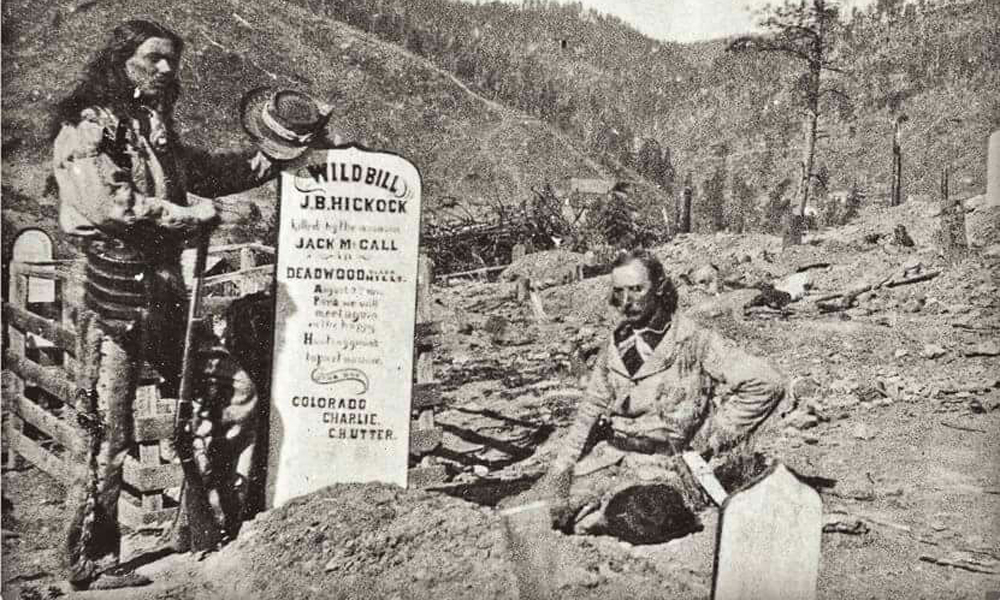
Early photograph of the grave of Wild Bill Hickok

In the 1880s it was determined that the land where Ingelside Cemetery was located could be better used for housing. Most of the bodies there were moved up the mountain to Mount Moriah and re-interred. However, since many graves were unmarked or unknown some were not moved. Today it is not uncommon for people working in their garden or remodelling a basement or shed to find human bones as a leftover from the Ingelside Cemetery days.

== Cemetery sections ==
The cemetery has many distinct sections. There are four different sections in the graveyard labelled potter's field, where the graves of unknown people or settlers that came from Ingelside were buried without a stone or marker. One section is labelled as a mass grave site. A fire burned down a lumber mill, killing eleven men sleeping there at the time. Another section is labelled the children's section, due to the large number of children buried in Mount Moriah that died from the typhus, cholera and smallpox outbreaks.

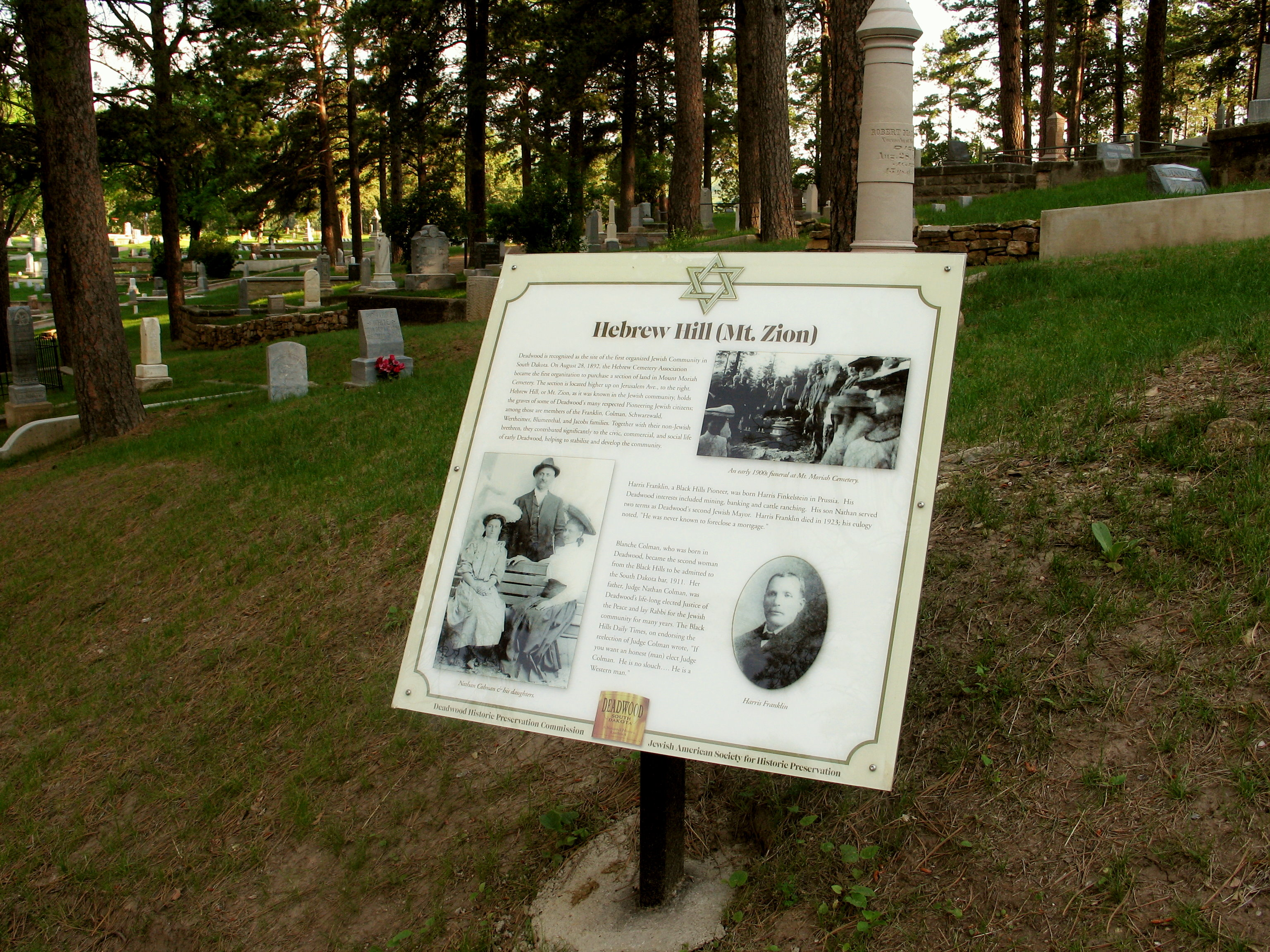
Historical plaque for Hebrew Hill

There is a Jewish section of the graveyard as there was a large Jewish community in early Deadwood and they were afforded more rights and equality in the rough frontier town than other places in the country at the time. Many of the inscriptions are written in Hebrew. Sol Star, a partner of Seth Bullock, was a member of this early Jewish community.

In addition there is a veterans section, where many Civil War and Indian War veterans are buried with gravestones supplied by the United States government at the request of their families.

=== Chinese Section ===
Deadwood was home to a sizable number of Chinese immigrants that settled in the area during the Black Hills gold rush, with an estimated 400 living in the city proper. The first recorded Chinese burial in Mount Moriah occurred on September 1, 1878. Over the next fifty years, approximately 33 Chinese migrants would be buried in the cemetery. However, because of the desire to be sent back to China, most of the bodies were disinterred. There are only three Chinese graves left in the cemetery, even though official signage lists two. The three tombstones read: "會大毓坟" (Grave of Hui Tian Fei), Wong Ngan Oi ("January 27, 1915, Age 15 yrs."), and a child of Fee Lee Wong (Born in Deadwood, SD. Died March 20, 1899").

In 1908, representatives from the Chinese community received permission to construct a burner and altar in Section Six, where the largest number of Chinese people were interred. The burner and altar was used for offerings intended for the departed spirits in accordance to their customs. It was reconstructed by the Deadwood Historic Preservation Commission in 2013.

== Notable interments ==
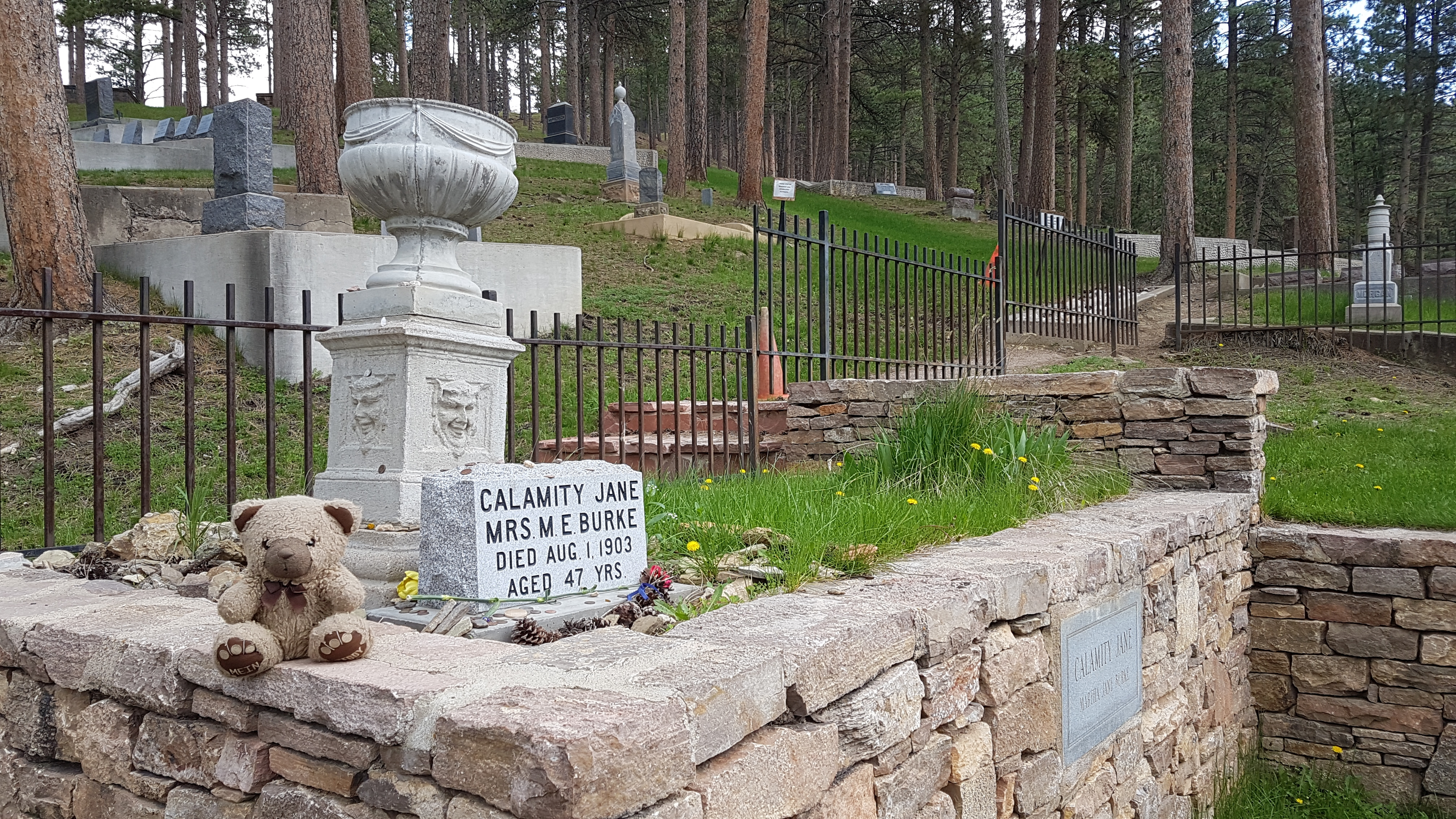
Calamity Jane's grave

Mount Moriah's main attraction is Wild Bill's gravesite. Calamity Jane and Potato Creek Johnny are buried next to him.

Other notable gravesites include:

- Granville G. Bennett (1833–1910), politician and lawyer
- Seth Bullock (1849–1919), U.S. Marshall, sheriff, and businessman
- Blanche Colman (1884–1978), first female lawyer in South Dakota
- Dora DuFran (1868–1934), brothel madam
- Freeman Knowles (1846–1910), politician and Civil War veteran
- Henry Weston Smith (1827–1876), preacher and murder victim
- William Randolph Steele (1842–1901), politician
