= Henry Weston Smith =

American preacher and early resident of Deadwood, South Dakota

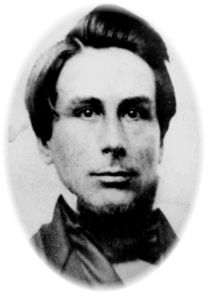
- Born: January 10, 1827; Ellington, Connecticut, US
- Died: August 20, 1876 (aged 49) between Deadwood and Crook City, South Dakota, US
- Cause of death: Murder
- Burial place: Mount Moriah Cemetery
- Occupation: Reverend

The Reverend Henry Weston Smith (January 10, 1827 – August 20, 1876) was an American preacher, doctor, and early resident of Deadwood, South Dakota.

Unlike most of the residents of the time, Smith was not interested in material riches; instead, he was the first preacher, of any denomination, in the Black Hills gold rush camps.

== Biography ==
Smith was born in Ellington, Connecticut, to Joshua Weston and Percey or Persey (Galpin) Smith of Berlin, Connecticut. In 1847, he married Ruth Yeomans, but both his wife and infant son died one year later. At the age of 23, Smith became a licensed "exhorter" and later a Methodist preacher. On February 23, 1858, while still in Connecticut, he married Lydia Ann Joselyn or Joslin, with whom he had four children. He subsequently moved to Massachusetts and, during the American Civil War, served with the 52nd Massachusetts Infantry, after which he became a doctor in 1867. The family moved to Louisville, Kentucky, in 1876.

== Move to Deadwood ==
In 1876, although not being appointed to do so by any church, Smith felt a calling to minister to the Black Hills Gold Rush, and that spring he accompanied a wagon train from Cheyenne, Wyoming, to the Black Hills, traveling on foot. He found work as a prospector and boarded a freight train in Custer, arriving in Deadwood in May 1876.

According to George V. Ayres, later a prominent merchant in the area, "Reverend Smith held the first church service in the Hills" at Custer City, on May 7, 1876, with 30 men and five women in attendance. Smith preached in Custer again the next Sunday, then offered $5 to Captain C. V. Gardner to accompany his wagon train to Deadwood, a three-day walk; as a Methodist himself, Gardner allowed Smith to come along without charge. In Deadwood, Smith became a street preacher, working at odd jobs during the week in addition to prospecting and mining, and also worked on the Boulder Ditch, a large project that did not pay many of those worked on it.

After working during the week, Smith would be found preaching on Main Street on Sundays and would travel miles on foot to preach at other settlements.

John S. McClintock's memoirs describe Smith preaching near the corner of Main and Gold Streets, to a mixture of curiosity and respect, with some removing their hats to listen.

As described by Gardner:

"In the years past I have noted in the press many statements regarding incidents connected with the man known as Preacher Smith. Most of them are pure romance. ... how he used to go into the saloons and pray are pure fiction. I never saw him in a saloon, and I am sure he never was. He preached frequently in Deadwood, generally in front of Bent and Deetken's drug store or in front of my store. ... in those days the town had 3,000 to 4,000 people, located mostly on one street, and he had no trouble in securing an audience. He was a man about 6 feet tall, with a fine physique and I should say 40 years old. He was very quiet and unassuming in manner. I know nothing of his past life, as he never volunteered to tell me and it was not wise in those days to inquire too closely into a man's antecedents."

== Death ==
On Sunday, August 20, 1876, Smith left a note on his cabin door after his Deadwood service, saying "Gone to Crook City to preach, and if God is willing, will be back at three o'clock." Friends concerned about the danger of Native Americans or thieves had warned Smith against walking alone and unarmed, but he is remembered as replying, "The Bible is my protection. It has never failed me yet." However, Smith was murdered as he walked to Crook City, his body found alongside the road by a local resident, the exact location no longer known. He had not been robbed, causing his death to be generally attributed to Native Americans, although some still believed he was killed by thieves. Another theory, however, held that he was murdered by a person or persons representing the saloons, brothels, casinos, and other "vice dens" of Deadwood, who feared that his preaching would cut into their income. Similar rumors had circulated after the recent murder of Wild Bill Hickok.

Seth Bullock, Deadwood's sheriff, described Smith's death in an August 21, 1876 letter to Reverend J. S. Chadwick:

"It becomes my painful duty to inform you that Rev. H. Weston Smith was killed by the Indians yesterday (Sunday) a short distance from this place. He had an appointment to preach here in the afternoon, and was on his way from Crook City when a band of Indians overtook him and shot him. His body was not mutilated in any way, and was found in the road a short time after the hellish deed had been done. His death was instantaneous as he was shot through the heart. His funeral occurred today from his home in this town. Everything was done by kind hands, that was possible under the circumstances, and a Christian burial given him. I was not personally acquainted with Mr. Smith, but knew him by reputation, as an earnest worker in his Master's Vineyard. He has preached here on several occasions, and was the only minister in the Hills. He died in the harness and his memory will be always with those who knew him. A letter from you which I found in his home causes me to convey this sad intelligence to you."

Smith's body was buried in a hillside cemetery in Deadwood, the service conducted by C. E. Hawley, a member of Smith's flock, in the absence of other clergy. The casket was later moved to Mount Moriah Cemetery, with a life-sized statue marking his grave.

== Memorial ==
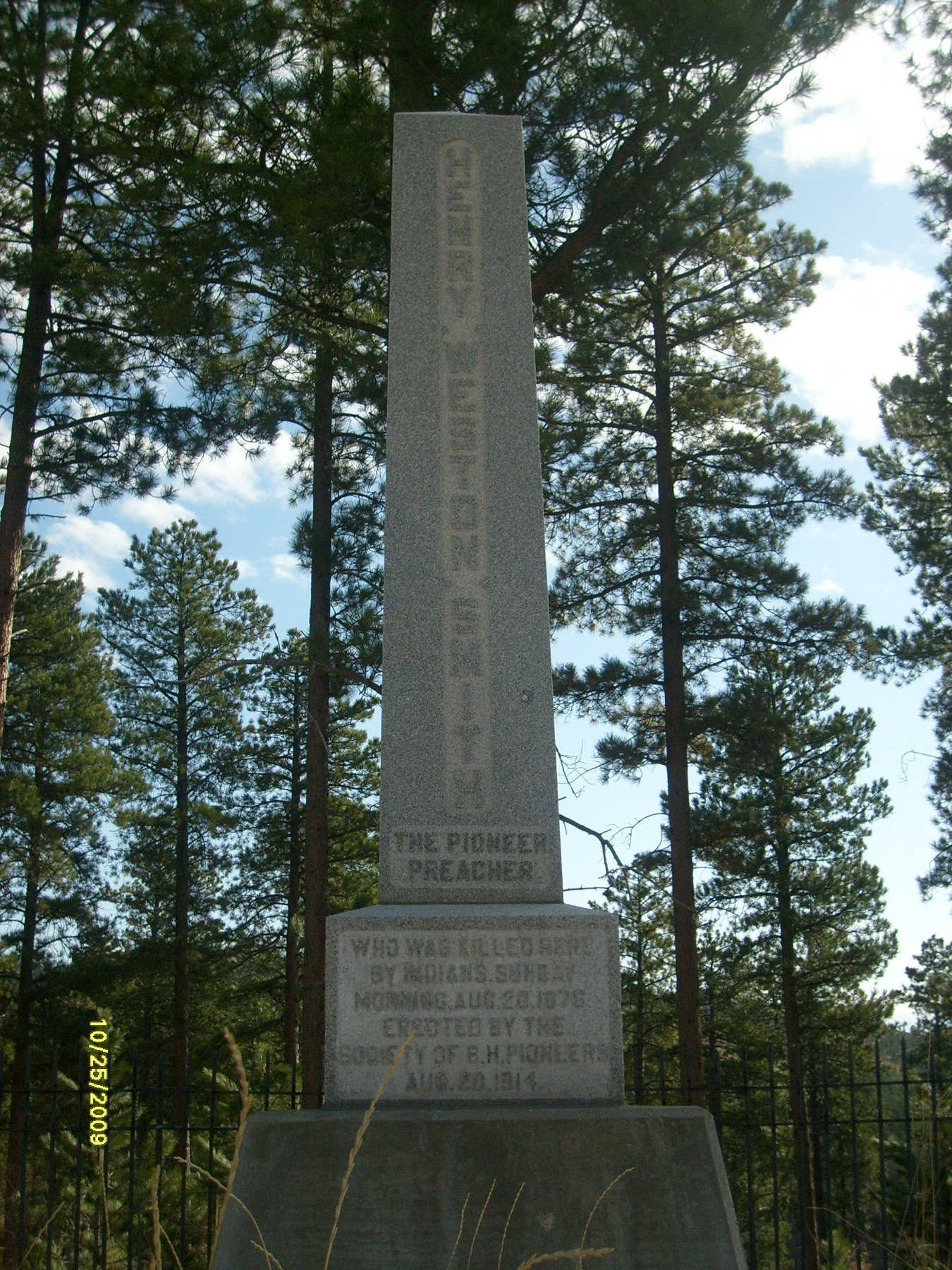
Monument in Deadwood, SD off US-85

In 1914, the Society of Black Hills Pioneers erected a monument on the road between Deadwood and Spearfish, South Dakota, in the approximate area where Smith's body had been found. In 1994, Highway 85 north of Deadwood, along with the Preacher Smith Monument, was relocated by construction of a four-lane road. A copper time capsule that had been buried in 1914 was opened, providing some period artifacts, such as newspapers; after examination, they, along with additional contemporary items, were returned to the capsule and reburied under the new monument, three miles north of Deadwood on the rebuilt Highway 85. The new monument was rededicated on August 20, 1995, on the 119th anniversary of Smith's murder. The highlight of the ceremony was a reading by local resident, historian, and lawyer Reed Richards of the sermon Preacher Smith had planned to deliver at Crook City that fateful day, 119 years delayed.

== Deadwood ==
Smith was portrayed in the HBO television series Deadwood (2004–2006) by actor Ray McKinnon. A letter written by the character of Seth Bullock (Timothy Olyphant) to the family of a murdered miner in the employ of a fictionalized George Hearst in the third season episode "Unauthorized Cinnamon" is nearly identical to the August 21, 1876, letter to Reverend J. S. Chadwick written by the real Seth Bullock. In the show, the circumstances of Smith's demise were changed to a gradual decay due to a brain tumor, though he was mercy-killed by Al Swearengen (Ian McShane) before dying from the cancer.

He was also depicted conducting the funeral of Wild Bill Hickok when in reality there was no preacher involved in his burial.

== See also ==
- List of unsolved murders
