= Buffalo Girls =

1990 American novel by Larry McMurtry

- Cover of the first edition
- Author: Larry McMurtry
- Language: English
- Genre: Western
- Publisher: Simon & Schuster
- Publication date: 1990
- Publication place: United States
- Media type: Print (Hardcover)
- Pages: 351
- ISBN: 067168518X
- Dewey Decimal: 813/.54
- LC Class: PS3563.A319 B84 1990

Buffalo Girls is a 1990 novel written by American author Larry McMurtry about Calamity Jane. It is written in the novel prose style mixed with a series of letters from Calamity Jane to her daughter. In her letters, Calamity describes herself as being a drunken hellraiser but never an outlaw. Her letters also describe her larger-than-life cohorts.

Buffalo Girls was later the basis for the 1995 CBS television movie of the same name, starring Anjelica Huston as Calamity Jane and Melanie Griffith as Dora DuFran.
