= Jerry Bryant (historian) =

American historian (1945–2015)

Jerry Lynn Bryant (October 22, 1945 – January 24, 2015) was an American historian. He was a member of the RPA, or Registered Professional Archaeologists. Bryant worked extensively within the Black Hills of South Dakota and more specifically within the city of Deadwood. His work for the HBO series Deadwood earned him honors from the Academy of Television Arts and Sciences. Bryant was also one of the foremost authorities on the life of Al Swearengen. Bryant was a fierce advocate of historical preservation.

Bryant died in Rapid City, South Dakota on January 24, 2015, at the age of 69.
