= Dora DuFran =

Brothel madame

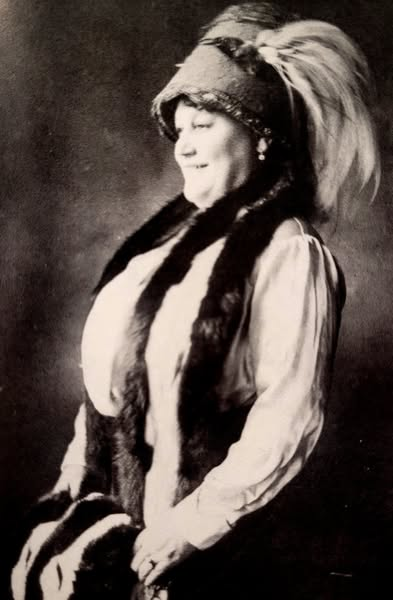
- DuFran in 1928
- Born: Amy Helen Bolshaw; November 16, 1868; Liverpool, England
- Died: August 5, 1934 (aged 65)
- Other names: Dora Bolshaw
- Occupation: Brothel madam
- Spouse: Joseph M. DuFran
- Parents: Joseph John Bolshaw (father); Isabella Neal Bolshaw (née Cummings) (mother)

Madam Dora DuFran or Dora Bolshaw (née Amy Helen Dorthea Bolshaw; November 16, 1868 – August 5, 1934) was one of the leading and most successful madams in the Old West days of Deadwood, South Dakota.

== Childhood ==
DuFran was born in Liverpool, England and emigrated to the United States with her parents Joseph John (1842–1911) and Isabella Neal (Cummings) Bolshaw (1844–1911) sometime around 1869. The family settled first at Bloomfield, New Jersey, then moved to Lincoln, Nebraska in 1876 or 1877. She was an extremely good looking girl in her youth, and became involved in prostitution around the age of 13 or 14. She then became a dance hall girl, calling herself Amy Helen Bolshaw. She is documented as still living in Lincoln, Nebraska, in 1883, employed as a domestic servant. Around that time, aged about 15, Dora relocated to the gold rush town Deadwood, South Dakota, and began operating a brothel.

== Career ==
DuFran picked up several girls who arrived in Deadwood via the wagon train led by Charlie Utter. From time to time, Old West personality Martha Jane Burke (Calamity Jane, 1852–1903) was in her employ. Dora's main competition in Deadwood was Madam Mollie Johnson.

DuFran had several brothels over the years. The most popular was called "Diddlin' Dora's", located on Fifth Avenue in Belle Fourche, South Dakota. "Diddlin' Dora's" advertised itself as "Three D's – Dining, Drinking, and Dancing – a place where you can bring your mother". And though the cowboys frequented the popular place, most just wanted to "get down to business", with at least one man remarking, "I wouldn't want my mother to know I had ever been there." Dora also owned The Green Front Hotel.

DuFran's other brothels in South Dakota and Montana were located in Lead, Miles City, Sturgis, and Deadwood. While in Deadwood, Dora got married and continued her brothel operations. After her husband's death, she moved the business to Rapid City, South Dakota, where she continued having success as a brothel owner.

== Marriage ==
DuFran married Joseph M. DuFran (June 16, 1862 – August 3, 1909), "a personable gentleman gambler" who helped grow her business.

== Death ==
DuFran died of heart failure in 1934. Her pet parrot Fred and husband Joseph are buried with her at Mount Moriah Cemetery in Deadwood.

== Publication ==
DuFran (under the pseudonym: d'Dee) published a 12-page booklet on Calamity Jane titled Low Down on Calamity Jane (1932). In 1981, this booklet was reprinted in an expanded 47-page version, edited by Helen Rezatto.

== In popular culture ==
DuFran is often credited with coining the term "cathouse", but evidence indicates that the term was in use before she began her career.

Dora DuFran is featured in Larry McMurtry's book about Calamity Jane, titled Buffalo Girls: A Novel (1990). In the TV movie Buffalo Girls (1995), based on McMurtry's book, Dora DuFran is played by Melanie Griffith.

In the TV series Deadwood and Deadwood: The Movie, the character of Joanie Stubbs is loosely based on Dora DuFran. Stubbs is played by actress Kim Dickens.
