= Deer Mountain Village =

Luxury Ski Community in South Dakota, United States

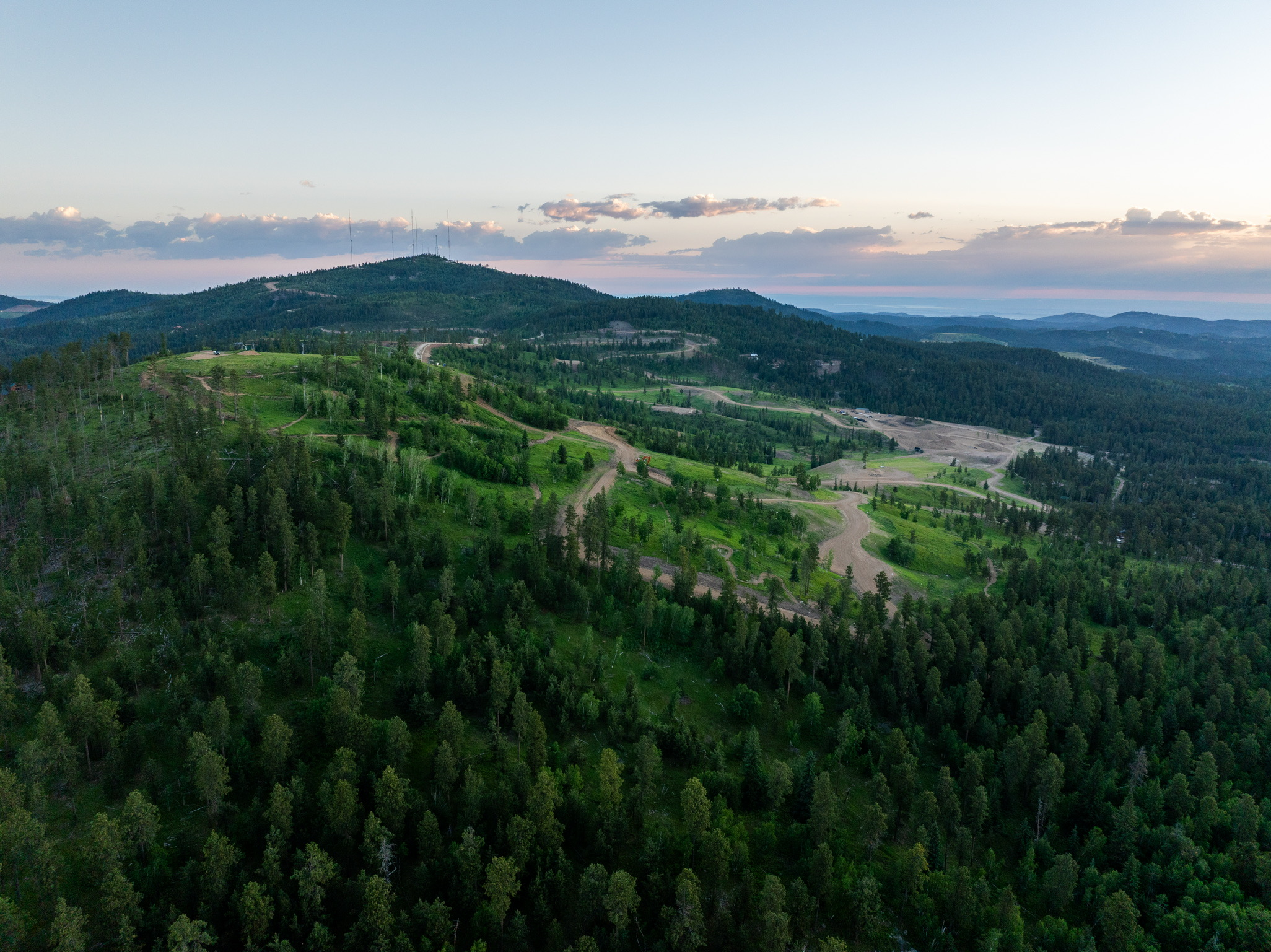
- Deer Mountain Village at dawn
- Interactive map of Deer Mountain Village
- Location: Lawrence County, South Dakota, United States
- Nearest city: Lead, South Dakota
- Coordinates: 44°18′30.36″N 103°49′6.39″W
- Owner: Keating Resources, LLC
- Vertical: 699 feet
- Top elevation: 6,654 feet
- Trails: 44 total
- Lift system: 3 total
- Terrain parks: 1 total
- Website: https://deermountainvillage.com/

Deer Mountain Village is a four-season luxury mountain community and ski resort located in the Black Hills just outside of Lead, South Dakota. Deer Mountain has a vertical drop of 699 feet, with a summit of 6,654 feet. It is the highest residential community east of the Rocky Mountains.

== Community Features ==
Developed by Keating Resources, this 640-acre, four-season community features 187 mountainside lots (1–3 acres each) with ski-in/ski-out access, mountain biking trails, and luxury amenities. The development revives the former Mystic Miner Ski Resort (1967–2017), transforming it into an exclusive adventure-oriented enclave.

== Acquisition and Vision ==
Keating Resources (founded by Gerard and Alec Keating) purchased the property in 2021 for redevelopment. Their vision focuses on creating a private community inspired by luxury mountain destinations like Victory Ranch (UT) and Tributary (ID), and Jackson Hole (WY).

== Current Status and Amenities ==
As of June 2025:

- Skiing: East Mountain Lift operational with 120 skiable acres (29% beginner, 48% intermediate, 24% advanced runs).
- Mountain Biking: 10+ miles of trails open, with bike carriers on lifts.
- Community: Amenities feature two ski lifts with 27 runs, the longest private snow tubing hill in the U.S., extensive trails, a trout pond, a 6,700-square-foot clubhouse, year-round heated pool, sports courts, and a private 220-acre wilderness area.

== Ownership and Management ==
Keating Resources, a family-owned investment company focusing on value-added real estate assets across the country, oversees development, with Gerard Keating (CEO) and Alec Keating (President) directing operations. The Keatings are known throughout the region for their efforts in improving community facilities. Their nearby properties include The Landmark Hotel and Casino in Deadwood, SD, Spearfish Mountain Ranch in Whitewood, SD, and Three Peaks Ranch, located in Lawrence County, SD.

The HOA will manage amenities, architectural standards and rental policies (minimum 3–6 night stays). Longer-stay policies ensure the maintaining of exclusivity, in addition to avoiding a culture of short-term rentals, but instead, a community of families.

== Surrounding Area ==
Deer Mountain Village borders Black Hills National Forest (1.25 million acres) and is minutes from:

- Deadwood: Historic gambling town (15-minute drive)
- Lead: Home to Sanford Underground Research Facility
- Spearfish: Cultural hub with Black Hills State University
- Rapid City Regional Airport (56 miles) offers direct flights to seven U.S. hubs.

== Historic $1 Million Lot Sale ==
On November 18, 2024, Deer Mountain Village made South Dakota real estate history by selling the state's first $1 million residential lot. This milestone sale was for a single 1.5-acre, ski-in/ski-out parcel with panoramic views of Spearfish Canyon and the Black Hills National Forest. The transaction marked the highest price ever paid for a residential lot in South Dakota since its founding in 1889. The sale is emblematic of the growing demand for luxury mountain properties in the region, with Deer Mountain Village attracting buyers from across the United States, including a significant share from Texas. By late 2024, phase one of the 187-lot development was already 35% sold, with total closed sales exceeding $10 million.

Developers Gerard and Alec Keating of Keating Resources attributed this success to the community’s unique value proposition: prime location bordering national forest, 100-mile unobstructed views, exclusive amenities, and thoughtful land planning. The project’s design, engineering, and marketing teams include TerraSite Design (Rapid City, SD), ASPEKT Architecture (Bozeman, MT), Studio K Creative (Chicago, IL), and Henry Street Creative (New York, NY), ensuring a blend of regional authenticity and high-end appeal.

== Construction Phases ==
- Phase 1 (2021–2023): East Mountain infrastructure including asphalt roads, municipal water, fiber optics, and electricity for 83 lots. The East Mountain Chairlift was restored with 6,224 feet of new haul rope and 88 refurbished chairs.
- Phase 2 (2024–2025): West Mountain development with 104 lots completed by October 2024. Clubhouse construction began in June 2024, featuring a heated pool, hot tub, and multipurpose courts.
- Phase 3 (2025–2026): West Mountain Ski Lift restoration (targeting December 2025) and 30 premium lots under construction.
