= Mary McLaughlin Craig =

American architect

- Born: 1889
- Died: 1964 (aged 74–75)
- Occupation: Architect
- Years active: 1925–1946

Mary McLaughlin Craig (1889–1964) was an architect, working throughout California despite her lack of formal training as a proponent of the Spanish Colonial style. The archive of her correspondence, specifications, drawings, notes, and photographs was acquired in 1976 by the Art, Design, & Architecture Museum at the University of California, Santa Barbara as part of the Architecture and Design Collection.

== Biography ==
Born in Deadwood, South Dakota, she moved to Pasadena in 1913. In 1919, she married architect James Osborne Craig. They worked together as architects in Santa Barbara until the time of his death, at which point she facilitated ongoing work on the projects and subsequently developed her own architectural practice focused mainly on residential works of architecture.

== Works ==
Name	City	Completed	Other Information	Image
Mrs. J.A. Andrew House #3 Plaza Del Rubio	Santa Barbara, California	1926		
Mr. and Mrs. Andrew Brown House	San Marino, California	1931		
Mrs. Andrew Brown House remodel Puente Drive	Pasadena, California	1926-27		
Mrs. Colin Campbell house	Goleta, California	1920-24		
Mrs. Colin Campbell barn	Goleta, California	undated		
W.H. Cowles garage building	Montecito, California	1926		
Mrs. James Osborne Craig house	Montecito, California	1939		
The Jade Tree House	Santa Barbara, California	1924		
Mr. and Mrs. A.E. Dietrich pavilion	Montecito, California	1931-33		
Mr. and Mrs. A.E. Dietrich beach cottage	Sandyland, California	1925		
Dog Hospital East Haley Street	Santa Barbara, California	1922		
Miss Amy Dupont garage building	Wilmington, Delaware	1928		
Col. G. Watson French house alterations	Montecito, California	1928		
Miss Katherine Harvey beach cottage	Serena, California	1933		
Mr. J.P. Jefferson service cottage	Montecito, California	undated		
Seth A. Keeney property maps	Montecito, California	1921		
The Lewis House	Santa Barbara, California			
James Marwick subdivision proposal	Santa Barbara, California	1924		
Mr. and Mrs. E.J. Miley house (San Leandro Ln.)	San Leandro, California	undated		
Mr. and Mrs. E.J. Miley house (San Ysidro Ln.)	Montecito, California	1924-27		

== See also ==
- List of California women architects
