= Bella Union Saloon =

Saloon and theater in Deadwood, South Dakota

Coordinates: 44.376°N 103.728°W

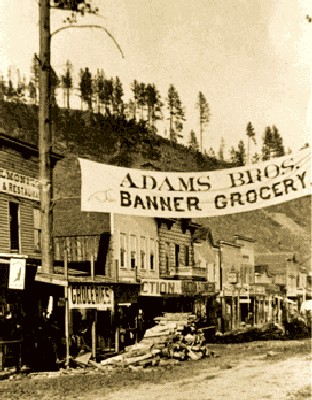
- Bella Union Saloon in Deadwood, South Dakota
- Interactive map of Bella Union Saloon
- Location: Deadwood, South Dakota
- Owner: Tom Miller
- Type: Saloon and theater
- Event: Other

Construction
- Built: 1876; 150 years ago
- Opened: September 10, 1876; 149 years ago

The Bella Union was a saloon and theater that opened on September 10, 1876, in Deadwood, South Dakota. The proprietor was Tom Miller, an aggressive businessman who would buy several neighboring properties as well.

The Bella Union was a relatively upscale establishment where town meetings came to be held.

In November 1878, Tom Miller went bankrupt, and the Bella Union became a grocery store downstairs and a meeting hall named Mechanics' Hall upstairs.

== In popular culture ==
A fictionalized version of the saloon appeared in the HBO television series Deadwood (2004-2006), where the owner was the character Cy Tolliver. In Deadwood: The Movie (2019), which is set ten years after the third and final season of the television series, Tolliver has since died, and the saloon is now owned and run by its former madam Joanie Stubbs. In the musical, Calamity Jane (1953), the character Henry Miller (not Tom), is the proprietor of the town's saloon and theater.
