= Liselotte Welskopf-Henrich =

German novelist and history professor (1901–1979)

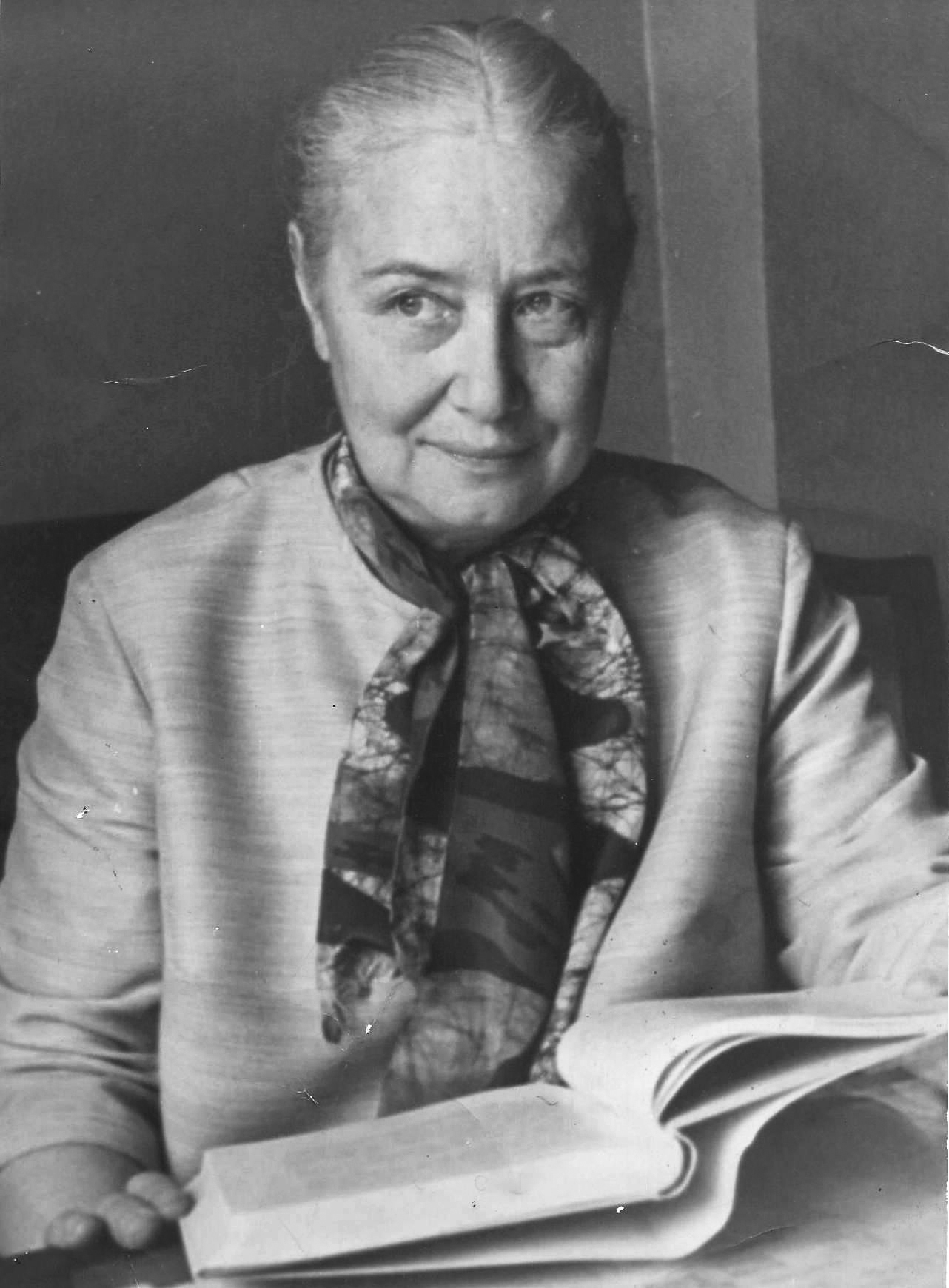
- Welskopf-Henrich in the late 1960s
- Born: Elisabeth Charlotte Henrich; 15 September 1901; Munich, Germany
- Died: 16 June 1979 (aged 77); Garmisch-Partenkirchen, West Germany
- Education: Frederick-William University, Berlin
- Occupations: Novelist, historian
- Political party: KPD SED
- Spouse: Rudolf Welskopf (1902–1979)
- Children: Rudolf (1948–)
- Parent(s): Rudolf Henrich (–1926); Marie Bernbeck
- Website: https://www.liselottewelskopfhenrich.com/

Liselotte Welskopf-Henrich (15 September 1901 – 16 June 1979) was a German novelist, activist, professor of ancient history, and the first woman to be elected full member of the German Academy of Sciences. She was a life-long supporter of Native American causes and the author of two series of revisionist Western novels, retelling US history centered on an Oglala Lakota hero. In 1965, during a visit to the Pine Ridge Reservation, she was given the Oglala name Lakota-Tashina ("Protective Blanket of the Lakota"). Oglala Lakota painter Arthur Amiotte referred to her as the “German Ella Deloria: grandmotherly, kind, and very interested in people.”

== Life ==
=== Background and early life ===
Welskopf-Henrich was born in Munich, daughter of Rudolf Henrich, a lawyer, and his wife, born Marie Bernbeck. As a child, Welskopf-Henrich enjoyed mountaineering in the Alps. In 1907, her family moved to Stuttgart, where Welskopf-Henrich first enrolled in school. At age nine, she was gifted by an uncle James Fenimore Cooper's Leatherstocking Tales, which sparked in her a lifelong interest and solidarity with Native American peoples. In a curriculum vitae written in April 1979, a few months before her death, and preserved among the Stasi files in the German Federal Archives, she wrote: "From early on I was brought up, through stories and conversation, to take the side of the oppressed and the tormented."

Welskopf-Henrich in March 1925

At age ten, she read in a newspaper about Mexico's president deploying armed troops against the Yaqui people of Sonora resisting displacement and wrote a letter to Mexican president Francisco Madero. She pleaded for compassionate treatment of the Yaqui and Madero replied, by letter to Welskopf-Henrich, stating he had instructed his troops to treat the Yaqui humanely. In 1913, Welskopf-Henrich's family relocated to Berlin, where she attended the Auguste-Victoria Lyceum and then the Augustaschule, a humanistic girls' Gymnasium, taking her Abitur in 1921. At Frederick-William University, she studied philosophy, ancient history, law, and economics. In May 1925 she received her doctorate in economics, "magna cum laude", with a dissertation on the organisation of the international shoe trade. She was urged to pursue a post-doctoral degree (habilitation), but her academic career was cut short by her family's finances due to hyperinflation in the Weimar Republic. Her father died in 1926. She worked in a department store 1925–27, at the Social Women's School in Berlin-Charlottenburg 1927–28, and from 1928 to 1945 at the Reich Statistical Office. In 1933 she declined an academic post rather than join the NSDAP. She worked at the Reich Statistical Office, she wrote in her 1979 curriculum vitae, first to provide for herself and her mother, then to get through the Nazi dictatorship without having to join the party.

=== Resistance activity ===
During Nazi reign, Welskopf-Henrich took part in the Confessing Church, a movement within German Protestantism in opposition to Nazi efforts to unify Protestant churches into a single, pro-Nazi German Evangelical Church. She was a confirmed opponent of National Socialism active in the resistance movement. She clandestinely delivered food and medication to interned Jews and French prisoners of war and assisted inmates from the Sachsenhausen concentration camp brought into Berlin as laborers. "My pressing need to do something for the politically persecuted", she wrote, "could at last be met in 1943." A work detail from Sachsenhausen's Lichterfelde sub-camp was renovating an apartment in her street for Ernst Kaltenbrunner, head of the SS security service. She bribed the SS-Unterscharführer in charge, Kurt Weil, with cigarettes. As cover she had the prisoners do small jobs for her; in her words, "The SS understood that; some of them could very easily be bribed." She contacted their families and mailed parcels into the camp, each day from a different post office. Rudolf Welskopf, a carpenter and communist, also imprisoned, learned of her help and made contact through an intermediary. The painter Hans Grundig, imprisoned with Welskopf, wrote in his memoir Zwischen Karneval und Aschermittwoch of "the woman who risked her life for us", adding that she "would have been finished, even at that hour, had the SS security service had the slightest suspicion". In 1944, she helped Welskopf, whom she later married, escape after ten years in captivity. She hid Welskopf for months in what remained of her home after the Allied bombings. To the other tenants she explained him as a soldier left unresponsive by a severe head wound, and with the help of the resistance pastor Harald Poelchau she kept him hidden until the end of the war. She was first questioned by police in 1940 over her aid to French prisoners of war and interrogated by the Gestapo on 11 August 1944. The Gestapo had been alerted by a thank-you letter from Australia, written by the daughter of a Jewish family in Berlin whom she had supplied with food and helped to flee in 1943. She talked her way out of the interrogation. In the last months of the war, she helped Welskopf produce leaflets urging German soldiers to surrender to the Red Army. Her 1953 autobiographical novel Jan und Jutta summarizes some of her resistance activity.

=== After the war ===
War ended in May 1945, leaving a large region surrounding Berlin administered as the Soviet occupation zone and Welskopf-Henrich remained in what would later become East Berlin. From 1945 to April 1946, she was personal secretary to the mayor of Charlottenburg and head of the district's statistics office, then moved to the Soviet Sector. In 1947, she took a position with "Baustoff-Ost GmbH", a building materials business.

In April 1946, following the Merger of the KPD and SPD creating the Socialist Unity Party (SED), Welskopf-Henrich was among hundreds of thousands of Communist Party members, who adopted SED membership while the SED developed a one-party state. In order to better inform herself, Welskopf-Henrich attended evening classes in Marxism–Leninism. Welskopf-Henrich's son, Rudolf, was born in 1948.

=== Political views ===
In 1946, Welskopf-Henrich joined the Communist Party of Germany (KPD). Her decision to join the Communist Party may have been influenced by her 1946 marriage to Rudolf Welskopf, who had been a member of the KPD since 1930. During the war Welskopf had worked to win her over to Marxism, as she described in her autobiographical novel Jan und Jutta.

Welskopf-Henrich's son, writing in his foreword to the 2015 posthumous edition of her novel, Bertholds neue Welt, identifies the 1956 Soviet invasion of Hungary as a turning point in his mother's political position. After the 1956 Hungarian uprising, she abandoned her Stalinist positions. She remained in the party. In 1978 she told the Zeit journalist Dieter E. Zimmer that she had always been politically engaged, but was no "organization man". Yet in a discipline dominated by Marxism-Leninism, she accepted a plurality of theories and methods. She was in contact with the dissidents Robert Havemann, Wolf Biermann and Stefan Heym, and was, in Lorenz's words, "an often uncomfortable person" for the GDR leadership. After 1956 and 1968, she smuggled money to persecuted writers in Hungary and Czechoslovakia. It was Biermann, expatriated from the GDR two years earlier, who put Zimmer in touch with her in 1978, as Zimmer revealed in 2010.

Bertholds neue Welt (Berthold's New World) was conceived as a sequel to her earlier novel, Jan und Jutta, and set in post-war Germany. Welskopf-Henrich did not seek publication during her lifetime, knowing her critical perspective of the GDR would foil publication. The novel was posthumously published in 2015.

=== Academic background ===
In 1949, Welskopf-Henrich was accepted at the Humboldt University of Berlin to a course in Ancient History. From 1952 she held a teaching post without yet having habilitated; in 1959 she habilitated with Die Muße als Problem im Leben und Denken der Hellenen von Homer bis Aristoteles (Leisure as a Problem in the Lives and Thoughts of the Hellenes from Homer to Aristotle), published in 1962 as Probleme der Muße im alten Hellas. In 1960, she was appointed Dozent and professor of Ancient History, the first woman professor of ancient history at Humboldt University. She had led the Ancient History department in an acting capacity since May 1958 and was confirmed in the post on 1 January 1961. In 1964 she became the first woman to be elected a full member of the German Academy of Sciences. Her first habilitation thesis had been rejected in 1954 by Werner Hartke, who later opposed her election to the Academy; only seven women had preceded her there, as corresponding, or honorary, not full, members. She personally paid up to eight research assistants from her royalties, protected politically suspect colleagues — one, the ancient historian Peter Musiolek, she took into her home after his release from a Soviet camp and found him work. Although emerita from 1966, she led the department in an acting capacity until 1968. In 1968, she declined an international congress in Indiana in solidarity with colleagues denied U.S. visas.

=== Academic works ===
In 1969, Welskopf-Henrich launched a research project into city states – "Polis" – in Ancient Greece. Supported by over sixty academics from East and West Germany and other countries, Hellenische Poleis (The Hellenic Poleis) was published by Akademie Verlag, Berlin, in 1974 in four volumes; she financed the project largely from her novel royalties.

In her follow-up work, supported by more than one-hundred contributors from forty countries, Welskopf-Henrich, classified social classes in Ancient Greece. Soziale Typenbegriffe im alten Griechenland (Social Classes of Ancient Greece), was completed after her death and published by Akademie Verlag, Berlin, in 1985.

=== Travels abroad ===
Welskopf-Henrich's academic standing in the GDR allowed her to travel abroad. Her son writes of holiday trips to Hungary after 1956 and to Czechoslovakia after 1968. As her revisionist Western novels grew popular internationally, Welskopf-Henrich was able to travel beyond the confines of Soviet sponsored "fraternal socialism". With the help of her publisher Lucie Groszer she kept part of the royalties from Western sales of her books in Western accounts, which paid for her travels. From these trips she smuggled records back for her son; the customs officer, her son recalled, even carried her heavy suitcase of records over the border.

=== Travels to the US and Canada ===
Welskopf-Henrich travelled to North America five times — Canada in 1963 and the United States in 1965, 1968, 1970, and 1974 — to engage with the Lakota and to deepen her understanding of their lives, culture, and traditions. In 1963, at Wood Mountain, Saskatchewan, she met the Lakota author John Okute Sica; after his death she sought a publisher for his manuscript in vain, and it appeared in German in 2009, as Das Wunder vom Little Bighorn, with her foreword. Of the farewell celebration at Pine Ridge on 25 May 1965 she wrote in her diary: "…and in the evening a great farewell celebration with the old dances. 8 drummers drummed, 4 sang, 12 dancers besides – night over the prairie – what a rhythm! (the Beatles are mere beginners by comparison) and I the only white among Indians. Received an Oglala name in a solemn ceremony." Her letter to her son she signed "Deine Mutti 'Lakota Tashina' (mein Indianername)" – "Your Mutti, 'Lakota Tashina' (my Indian name)". The Stasi opened a file on her in 1972 and closed it the next year as insignificant. The thin file recorded her impeccable reputation as an anti-fascist. In 1972 the Stasi considered recruiting her as an informant to report on her travels in the United States, but dropped the idea because of her age. In 1974, lacking a Canadian visa, but knowing that Native people crossed the border freely through the Jay Treaty, she entered Canada as an "Indian grandmother".

== Novels ==
=== Novels about the Weimar Republic, Nazism, and aftermath of World War II ===
Welskopf-Henrich at the Fourth German Writers' Congress, East Berlin, January 1956

Welskopf-Henrich lived through World War I, the Weimar Republic, the Third Reich, and the GDR. In the 1950s she wrote several novels in part based on her experiences.

- Zwei Freunde (Two Friends), written in shorthand during the war, to hide it from the Gestapo, concerns the Weimar Republic and early manifestations of Nazism.
- Jan und Jutta (Jan and Jutta), published in 1953, is in most aspects an autobiographical account of Welskopf-Henrich's experiences during World War II, including her relationship with her future husband, Rudolf Welskopf.
- Der Bergführer (The Mountain Guide), published in 1954 by Mitteldeutscher Verlag, centers on a mountain guide in the Dolomites in 1939. The novel deals with Nazism and its story was censored, leading to historical inaccuracies. The book met with little success upon initial release. Faithful to the original manuscript, it was re-issued in 2015.
- Bertholds neue Welt (Berthold's New World) a sequel to Welskopf-Henrich's earlier novel, Jan und Jutta, and set in postwar Germany, was posthumously published in 2015.

=== Revisionist Western novels ===
Drawing on her decades-long engagement with the Lakota history and culture and her time among the Lakota, Welskopf-Henrich wrote two series of revisionist Western novels. The novels retell US history and center on Oglala Lakota heroes. Penny credits the novels with ethnographic seriousness; they give a humanistic portrayal of the Lakota and center on two pivotal events in US history: Custer’s 1876 defeat at the Little Bighorn and the 1973 Occupation of Wounded Knee. The novels were translated into 18 languages and Die Söhne der Großen Bärin alone sold more than 7.5 million copies. Both series remain in print. She also wrote a children's book, Der Steinknabe (The Stone Boy, 1952), based on The Stone Boy in Dakota author Charles Eastman's Indian Boyhood.

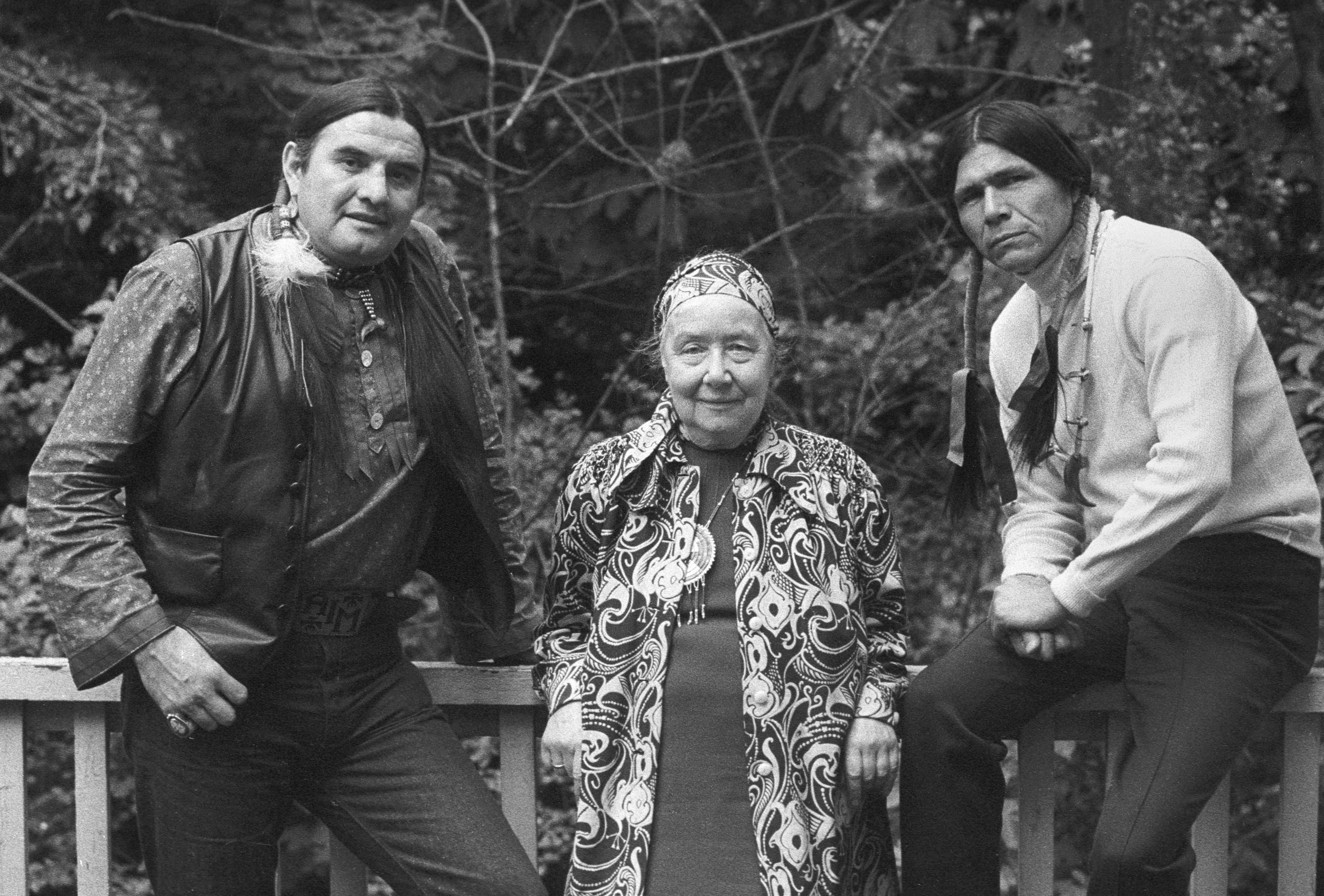
Vernon Bellecourt, Liselotte Welskopf-Henrich, and Dennis Banks at Welskopf-Henrich's house, Berlin, 1975. Photo by Thomas Sandberg

==== Die Söhne der Großen Bärin ====
Die Söhne der Großen Bärin (Sons of the Great Bear) began publication in 1951. It is a series of six novels set in the years 1862 to 1877. The hero, Harka, later called Tokei-ihto, is an Oglala Lakota youth, who defends Lakota lands against the U.S. Army, gold-seekers, and settlers, when gold is discovered in the Black Hills, and he rises to become a visionary leader of his people. Held prisoner at a U.S. Army fort during the 1876 Battle of the Little Bighorn, he escapes and leads his people to freedom across the Missouri into Canada. Die Söhne der Großen Bärin is a classic of youth literature and in 1963 UNESCO listed it among the best books for young readers in the world.

She had resolved at seventeen, at the end of the First World War, to write about the Plains nations' fight for survival, and had finished the manuscript by 1940. It remained unpublished for a decade. Rejected by three East German publishers between 1949 and 1951, it was taken by Lucie Groszer's Altberliner Verlag, which printed 15,000 copies in December 1951; they sold out quickly. Johannes Bobrowski edited it. In 1971 the publisher split it into six volumes against her wishes.

==== Das Blut des Adlers ====
Das Blut des Adlers (Blood of the Eagle) began publication in 1966. It is a five-novel series set in the years 1965 to 1974. The hero is a young Oglala Lakota. Criminalized as a youth for a theft he never committed, he leaves behind a life of crime and returns back home to the Pine Ridge Reservation with the dream of returning the buffalo to ancestral lands. Despite hostility from the tribal council and encroaching ranchers, he prevails in building up a buffalo ranch and rises to become a leader of the Lakota. He contributes to the foundation of the American Indian Movement (AIM) and the series culminates in the 1973 Occupation of Wounded Knee.

==== Themes ====
In a 1966 essay she wrote: "I did not tell of the Plains Indians for the sake of their war bonnets and their tomahawks, but because their life and thinking and their achievements and mistakes occupy me." Welskopf-Henrich saw in the Lakota people, who “under exceptionally difficult conditions remain courageous, honest, helpful, and honorable, and who fight with all their strength for their people’s right to live.” Both Die Söhne der Großen Bärin and Das Blut des Adlers are in part psychological examinations of characters in crisis situations. The protagonist's convictions are tested, and in Tokei-ihto, the hero of Die Söhne der Großen Bärin, Welskopf-Henrich saw a leader with "unflinching willingness to endure extreme hardship, while working to save his community."

==== Sources and influences ====
Welskopf-Henrich's first exposure to stories involving Native Americans were James Fenimore Cooper's Leatherstocking Tales at age nine. She soon read all of Cooper, but later felt Cooper's portrayal of the Mohicans was "idealized" and "romanticized" and distanced herself from Cooper's work and consulted the work and lectures of George Catlin. She also read Friedrich Gerstäcker, the ethnologists Julius Lips and Eva Lips, and the autobiographies of Black Elk and Luther Standing Bear. She read Karl May in secret as a child and was at first enthralled, but came to reject his Winnetou, whose devotion to Old Shatterhand she found servile; the rejection made her determined to find out "how it really was". She turned to Indigenous authors, reading Dakota author Charles Eastman, who was highly successful in Germany during the interwar years. Eastman remained a life-long influence and Welskopf-Henrich studied the work of anthropologists Franz Boas, Alice Fletcher, Frances Densmore, and Margaret Mead. She was in correspondence with ethnologist Walter Krickeberg and the anti-fascist ethnologist Eva Lips, who also worked towards a realistic and humanistic portrayal of Native Americans. Welskopf-Henrich's standing in the GDR allowed her to receive Native American newspapers and monographs, which she read and then illegally distributed.

==== Film adaptation ====
In 1962 Welskopf-Henrich brought Die Söhne der Großen Bärin to DEFA herself. She wanted "a historical-social character drama", not an adventure or children's film, and had written her own script for the 1966 film adaptation. She wanted the Lakota to be played by Canadian Native Americans, so that they would not be represented by outsiders – "a modern view for the 1960s", in the words of the film historian Anett Werner-Burgmann. She had won the interest of the Lakota community at Wood Mountain, Saskatchewan, in playing the leading roles. DEFA cast the Yugoslav actor Gojko Mitić as Tokei-ihto instead; in February 1965 she wrote to producer Josef Mach that Mitić looked in his publicity photo like Karl May's Winnetou and "absolutely no war chief". When she learned that a different screenplay had been written behind her back, she distanced herself from the project and had her name removed as scriptwriter; the credits kept only "based on the novel of the same name by Liselotte Welskopf-Henrich". In December 1966 she threatened DEFA with legal action over any further adaptations and refused to allow any of her novels to be filmed again, insisting that "too many liberties were taken". As a scholar she cared about historical accuracy and found it hard to bear when the filmmakers took liberties, such as putting a bathing jetty on a prairie creek. The film became the first in a long series of successful DEFA films featuring Native American stories.

==== Reception ====
Claus Biegert wrote in 1976 that Welskopf-Henrich was "spoken of with great respect in Native America". Frederik Hetmann and Alfred Keil (1977) set her apart from Karl May, a distinction Penny notes has been widely accepted; Thomas Kramer (2003) attempted to refute it. Penny (2008) reads her as a case of Eigen-Sinn — a woman who carved out a space of her own in the GDR. He treats her ethnographic and political engagement as serious and rejects the assumption that Cold War politics drove her Native American activism, in which the East German state took little interest, and which was her own. A 2002 conference in Halle was devoted to her scholarly and literary work. Scholarship on the novels themselves began with Elsa Christina Muller's 1995 dissertation. Marking the 125th anniversary of her birth, the Süddeutsche Zeitung ran a full-page profile by Johanna Pfund in September 2026. Pfund credited the novels with shaping how Germans in East and West pictured the Indigenous peoples of North America, and wrote that under the Nazi dictatorship she "showed a courage that many others lacked".

== Support of Native American causes ==
Welskopf-Henrich was a lifelong supporter of Native American causes. She worked to have Native American authors translated into German and went out of her way to support Native Americans in their efforts to improve their material conditions. She sent money and parcels of clothing and toys to families she had met on her travels, organized care packages in the GDR for impoverished Native families, and donated 900 of the 3,000 Deutschmark Gerstäcker prize money to the United Natives of America in California and the Association on Indian Affairs in New York. She wrote to President Jimmy Carter and to civil-rights attorney Sanford Rosen on the rights of the Indian nations. She petitioned public officials on behalf of Native Americans she had met in prisons and offered to help pay for their legal defense. She was well-regarded on the Pine Ridge Reservation and felt it was crucial for the two cultures to communicate with each other. At Pine Ridge she was, in Pfund's words, received as one of their own and called "Grandmother", an honorific.

During the 1969-71 Occupation of Alcatraz, she visited the island, helped secure the occupiers' drinking-water supply, and assisted Native American activists and collaborated with the leading Native American activist newspaper at the time, the Akwesasne Notes. In 1974, she attended a memorial for Pedro Bissonette on the Pine Ridge Reservation. Bissonette was an Oglala Lakota leader during the 1973 Occupation of Wounded Knee. He had been shot by Bureau of Indian Affairs police at a roadblock in Pine Ridge in October 1973; the circumstances remain disputed.

In 1968, she published an essay in the Native Voice, Canada's first Indigenous-focused newspaper. On 14 January 1969 she briefed the GDR Foreign Ministry on the American Indian Movement, and on 18 April 1973 gave a GDR broadcast interview on Wounded Knee, in which she explained that many Native Americans regarded federal assimilation through Bureau of Indian Affairs schools as "cultural genocide". Richard Erdoes hosted her in New York in 1974, and she tried to find a German publisher for Lame Deer, Seeker of Visions, John Fire Lame Deer's memoir written with Erdoes. She stayed at the Akwesasne Notes house and in 1975 sent books and blankets to the Akwesasne school. In a 1975 letter to Ann Rourke of the Akwesasne Library she wrote that Native people in part still knew how to combine community with individuality, while the GDR lacked solidarity and people there would have to learn it again.

After seeing Oglala Lakota artist Arthur Amiotte's work in the Sioux Indian Museum in Rapid City, Welskopf-Henrich sought out Amiotte, then art instructor at the Porcupine Day School, and visited his grandmother Christina Standing Bear, of the family of Standing Bear, who illustrated Black Elk Speaks, and the Austrian nurse Louise Rieneck, at her home on the reservation. The two maintained a friendship, and Welskopf-Henrich collaborated with Amiotte to bring works of his students to a show in Berlin. She also maintained a friendship with the Yanktonai Dakota painter Oscar Howe and his family, spending a week in his Vermillion, South Dakota, studio and corresponding with the Howes until her death.

=== Support of the American Indian Movement (AIM) ===
Welskopf-Henrich was an active supporter of the American Indian Movement (AIM) and AIM activists repeatedly turned to her for support. In 1975, AIM co-founders Vernon Bellecourt and Dennis Banks travelled to West Berlin to open an AIM office. When they travelled across the Iron Curtain to meet with Welskopf-Henrich and East German support groups, Welskopf-Henrich hosted Bellecourt and Banks at her home in East Berlin. Her son remembered the visit as "ein großer Bahnhof" – the house full of people coming and going. Clyde Bellecourt and Chris Spotted Eagle also visited her there; Bellecourt arrived unannounced in the winter of 1974–75 in the middle of a meeting of sixteen scholars. West and East German support groups worked together to support AIM's Red Power movement and to finance visits by AIM members. When Banks asked Welskopf-Henrich to collect signatures for a protest, she took to the airwaves and went to the press and collected tens of thousands of signatures in support of AIM. She also collected signatures in support of Sarah Bad Heart Bull and Russell Means, as they battled US courts. Sarah Bad Heart Bull was the mother of Wesley Bad Heart Bull, whose killing was one of the events leading to the 1973 Occupation of Wounded Knee. AIM co-founder Russell Means was a regular guest at Welskopf-Henrich's house, visiting her for the third time after the Geneva human rights conference. Means trusted Welskopf-Henrich and referred to her as "the grandmother", or Unci; she in turn gave him the name Tokei-ihto. Welskopf-Henrich was one of Means's most important contacts to the German media and he provided Welskopf-Henrich with information and handwritten letters and writings, so that she could distribute them among German supporters. When in New York a West German journalist asked Means for a radio-interview, he referred the journalist to Welskopf-Henrich, and replied, "All I have to say I have already written down for the grandmother." By late 1974 Welskopf-Henrich reported that AIM had received more letters of support from the GDR than from the rest of Europe combined.

Upon publication of Das Blut des Adlers, Welskopf-Henrich encouraged her readers to actively support AIM. East German currency was of no use in the US, but Welskopf-Henrich used the Western currency she received from the sales of her books to send money to AIM chapters and the International Indian Treaty Council. Because of her open support for AIM, Welskopf-Henrich spent a night in the Pine Ridge Tribal Jail and was detained and interrogated by the FBI.

== Death and legacy ==
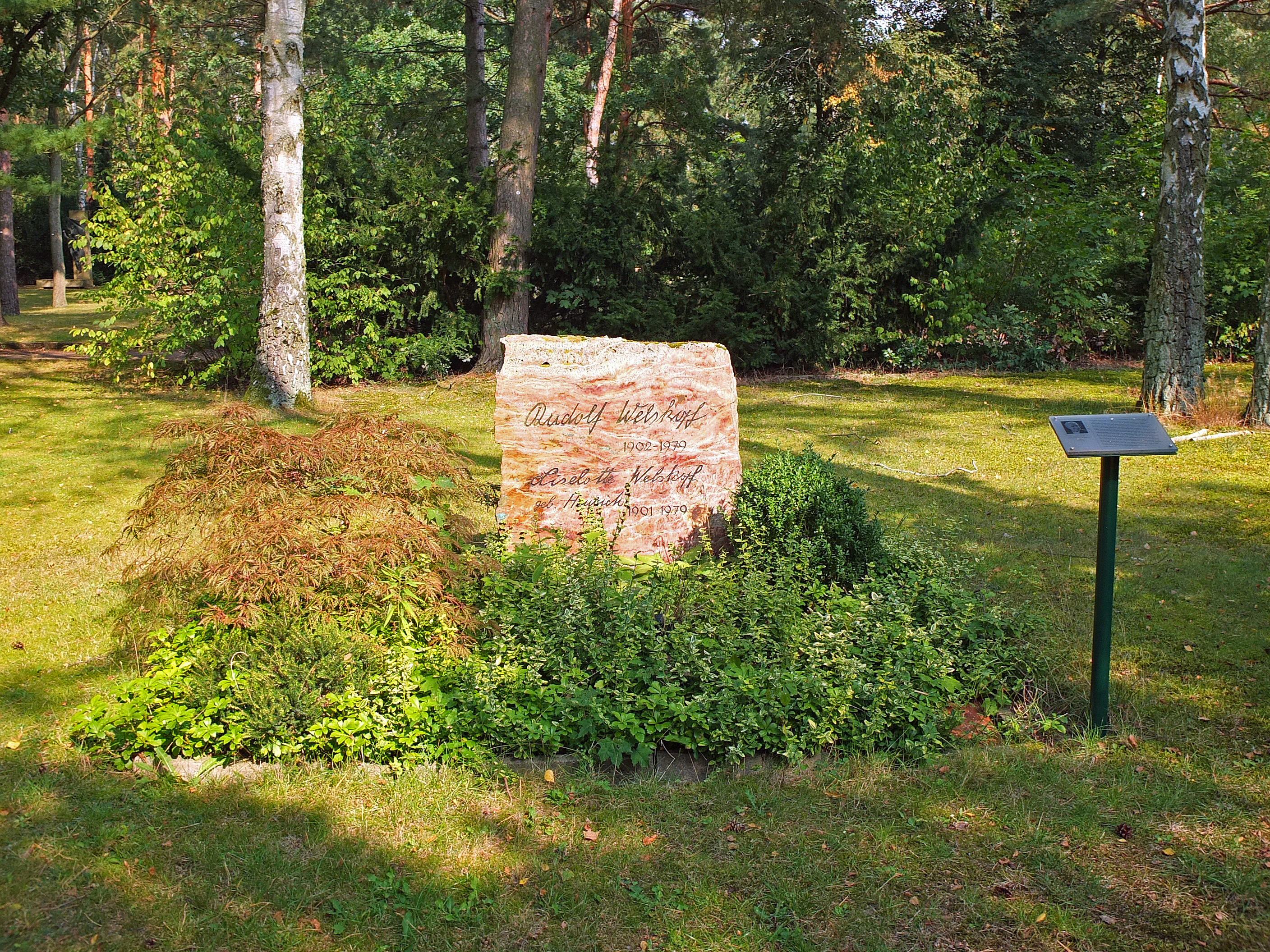
Welskopf-Henrich's grave

On 16 June 1979 Liselotte Welskopf-Henrich died during a holiday in Garmisch-Partenkirchen, a few months after her husband and shortly after finishing the manuscript of Das helle Gesicht, the fifth and last volume of Das Blut des Adlers. She was 77. They are buried together in Berlin-Köpenick. In August 2001 the State of Berlin declared her grave an Ehrengrab, an honorary grave maintained by the city.

== Awards and honours ==
- 1951 First prize for youth literature of the German Democratic Republic for Die Söhne der Großen Bärin
- 1958 Patriotic Order of Merit in Bronze
- 1961 Patriotic Order of Merit in Silver
- 1963 Die Söhne der Großen Bärin listed by UNESCO among the best books for young readers in the world
- 1965 Pestalozzi Medal
- 1966 Banner of Labor
- 1968 Friedrich Gerstäcker prize for Die Söhne der Großen Bärin, awarded bi-annually "to recognize linguistically sophisticated works that promote to young adults tolerance, cosmopolitanism, and openness towards the traditions, beliefs, and values of other cultures."
- 1972 National Prize of the German Democratic Republic 3rd class
- 1974 Hervorragender Wissenschaftler des Volkes (Distinguished Scientist of the People)

== Works ==
Selected works, per the catalogue of the German National Library.

=== Fiction ===
- Die Söhne der Großen Bärin (1951; six-volume edition from 1962/63: Harka; Der Weg in die Verbannung; Die Höhle in den Schwarzen Bergen; Heimkehr zu den Dakota; Der junge Häuptling; Über den Missouri)
- Jan und Jutta (1953)
- Der Bergführer (1954; original version 2015)
- Zwei Freunde (1956)
- Die Wege trennen sich (1956)
- Das Blut des Adlers: Nacht über der Prärie (1966); Licht über weißen Felsen (1967); Stein mit Hörnern (1968); Der siebenstufige Berg (1972); Das helle Gesicht (1980)
- Wakiya (1967, abridged Licht über weißen Felsen)
- Bertholds neue Welt (2015)

=== Children's Books ===
- Der Steinknabe (1952)
- Drei Wassertropfen (1953)
- Hans und Anna (1954)
- Kate in der Prärie (1955)
- Frau Lustigkeit und ihre fünf Schelme (1958)

=== Scholarship ===
- Die Produktionsverhältnisse im Alten Orient und in der griechisch-römischen Antike (1957)
- Probleme der Muße im alten Hellas (1962)
- Hellenische Poleis. Krise – Wandlung – Wirkung, ed., 4 vols. (1974)
- Soziale Typenbegriffe im alten Griechenland und ihr Fortleben in den Sprachen der Welt, ed., 7 vols. (1981–85)
