= Standing Bear (disambiguation) =

Standing Bear (c. 1829–1908) was a Ponca Native American chief.

Standing Bear may also refer to:

== Places ==
- Chief Standing Bear Memorial Bridge, a bridge across the Missouri River at the Nebraska-South Dakota border, named after the Ponca chief
- Standing Bear Lake, West Omaha, Nebraska, a park and reservoir named after the Ponca chief

== People ==
- Luther Standing Bear (1868–1939), Oglala Lakota Native American author, educator, philosopher and Hollywood actor
- Henry Standing Bear (c. 1874–1953), Oglala Lakota Native American chief who commissioned the Crazy Horse Memorial
- Geoffrey Standing Bear, chief of the Osage Nation since 2014
- Standing Bear (Mató Nájin) (1859-1933), or Mató Nájin, a Minneconjou Lakota known for his artwork

== Fictional characters ==
- Henry Standing Bear, a character in the TV series Longmire, played by Lou Diamond Phillips
- Jon Standing Bear, one of several DC Comics characters named Super-Chief
