= Indian Actors Association =

Organization for Native American actors

The Indian Actors Association was formed around 1936 and was a non-profit Hollywood based organization. They formed after and were influenced by the War Paint Club, an organization meant to protect rights of Native American actors. Additionally, driven by the Hollywood practice of occasionally casting non-native actors as Native Americans in films, the Native actors working in Los Angeles at the time seized their opportunity to establish a pool of “authentic” indigenous actors to work in film.

Their goal was also to keep indigenous portrayals and culture from being misrepresented on the screen. The Indian Actors Association fought for equality and employment for indigenous actors at a time when they were not seen as important or equal. The country's economic depression and the Western movie hiatus left many indigenous actors unemployed.

== Background ==
Due to the economic depression, coupled with a shift in movie genre popularity, Indian actors struggled to find work. Many Indian actors were Los Angeles-based. Although a few notable Indian actors like Will Rogers, Chief Yowlachie, and Chief John Big Tree had main roles as Indians, other Indian actors would only get hired for smaller roles.

There were very few leading roles for Indian actors, and even when it came to small parts and extras Indian actors had to compete against other actors who were impersonating Native Americans. Indian Actors found themselves competing against Syrian, Arab, Latino, and American actors for parts designed for Indian actors. By using make-up, braids, tanner, and dark hair actors pretended to be Indian and convinced film studios to give them Indian parts. This obviously did not sit well with Indian actors because a lot of the jobs they were trying to get were given to pseudo-Indians.

Many Native American roles were played by actors of other cultures who were pretending to be Native Americans. Indian dialect was often represented by monosyllabic words which were not accurate and Indian actors were not happy with how they were misrepresented. They set up programs to teach studios about Indian dialect and culture.

Indian actors were also unhappy with the difference in pay between them and non-Indian actors. Non-Indian extras made eleven dollars an hour while Indian extras would only make five dollars and fifty cents an hour.

The Indian Actors Association, which was affiliated with the screen actors guild, was created in an attempt to correct the inequality Indian actors were facing and to change misrepresentations of Indians in films. They demanded that only “real” Indians play Indian roles, and suggested that studios use Indian technical experts. They believed that this would help eliminate misrepresentations and teach studios about Indian dialect and pictography. The Indian Actors Association criticized pseudo-Indian actors because they misrepresented action and dialect of Native Americans.

The association established a closed shop agreement for Indian affiliated members.

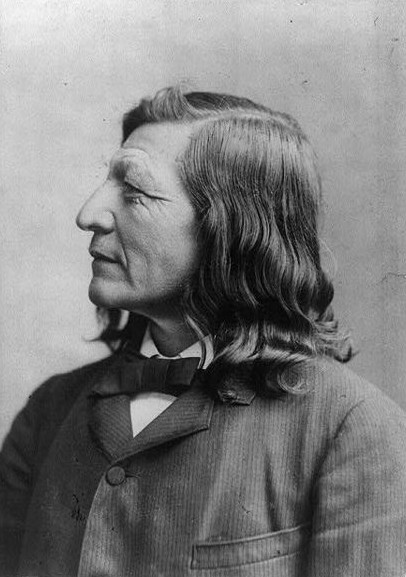
Luther Standing Bear, founder of the IAA.

== Founder ==
The Indian Actors Association was first led by Luther Standing Bear from the Lakota (Sioux) Tribe. He was an outspoken and an author, activist, and performer. He believed that western stories misrepresented Indians so he used his standing in Hollywood to try to change the way audiences saw Indian representations. His younger brother Henry Standing Bear also ran an Indian activist group, the Society of American Indians. The group put on plays and pageants representing historical truth and ethnological accuracy. Standing Bear led the Indian Actors Association until his death in 1939. After his death the association was led by many Treaties and Bill Hazlet, a Blackfeet Indian and actor. He was also always one of the chairmen of the Indian Actors Association.

== Accomplishments ==
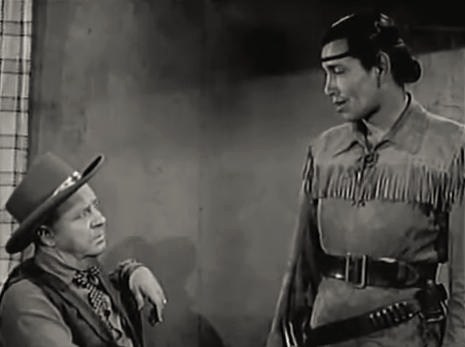
Jay Silverheels as Tonto in The Lone Ranger.

The Indian Actors Association was eventually successful in achieving some of their goals and raising awareness about Indian representations. They were able to get the wage difference for Indian extras compared to other actors to be eliminated. Indian extras were eventually paid the equal eleven dollars an hour. The Indian Actors Association was also able to empower Indians and spur formation of reform groups. Many Indian actors shared the belief that the best way to address the struggle of Indian actors in Hollywood was to become a part of Hollywood. One of these groups was National League for Justice to American Indians (NLJAI). The association created a booklet, Screen Land's First Americans. The booklet had twenty unnumbered pages of paintings and portraits of chiefly Indian actors. The booklet featured the officers, directors and lady auxiliary of the Indian Actors Association.

The Indian Actors Workshop was another group built on the foundation of the Indian Actors Association. Founded by Jay Silverheels, best known for playing Tonto on The Lone Ranger, the Indian Actors Workshop trained Indians for roles in film and television. Similar groups continued to form well into the 1980s.

The Indian Actors Association was able to function as a support group and provided subsistence funds for out of work Indians. They were able to raise these funds through membership dues, powwows, and performances for local clubs and organizations.
