= Neihardt =

Neihardt is a surname. Notable people with the surname include:

- Hilda Neihardt (1916–2004), American lawyer and writer
- John G. Neihardt (1881–1973), American writer and poet, amateur historian, and ethnographer
