= Crazy Horse Memorial =

Mountain monument under construction in South Dakota

- The Crazy Horse Memorial in 2020
- Interactive map of Crazy Horse Memorial
- Location: Custer County, South Dakota, U.S.
- Coordinates: 43°50′7.45″N 103°37′16.67″W
- Designer: Korczak Ziolkowski
- Type: Mountain carving monument
- Material: Leucogranite
- Length: 641 ft (195 m) (planned)
- Height: 563 ft (172 m) (planned)
- Beginning date: June 3, 1948; 78 years ago
- Dedicated to: Crazy Horse
- Website: crazyhorsememorial.org

The Crazy Horse Memorial is a mountain monument under construction on privately held land in the Black Hills, in Custer County, South Dakota, United States. It will depict the Oglala Lakota warrior Crazy Horse, riding a horse and pointing to his tribal land. The memorial was commissioned by Henry Standing Bear, a Lakota elder, to be sculpted by Korczak Ziolkowski. It is operated by the Crazy Horse Memorial Foundation, a nonprofit organization.

The monument has been in progress since 1948 and is far from completion.

== Overview ==
The memorial master plan includes the mountain carving monument, a Native American Museum of North America, and a Native American Cultural Center. The monument is being carved out of Thunderhead Mountain, on land considered sacred by some Oglala Lakota, between Custer and Hill City, roughly 17 miles (27 km) from Mount Rushmore.

The sculpture's final dimensions are planned to be 641 feet (195 m) long and 563 feet (172 m) high. The outstretched left arm will be 263 feet (80 m) long, the opening under arm 70 feet (21 m) wide and 100 feet (30 m) high, and the extended index finger 29 feet 6 inches (9 m) long. The face of Crazy Horse, completed in 1998, is 87 feet 6 inches (26.7 m) high; by comparison, the heads of the four U.S. Presidents at Mount Rushmore are each 60 feet (18 m) high.

== Crazy Horse ==
Crazy Horse was an Oglala Lakota war leader. He took up arms against the U.S. Federal government to fight against encroachments on the territories and way of life of the Lakota people. His most famous actions against the U.S. military included the Fetterman Fight (21 December 1866) and the Battle of the Little Bighorn (25–26 June 1876). He surrendered to U.S. troops under General George Crook in May 1877 and was fatally wounded by a military guard, allegedly while resisting imprisonment at Camp Robinson in present-day Nebraska. He ranks among the most notable and iconic of Native American tribal members and was honored by the U.S. Postal Service in 1982 with a 13¢ postage stamp that is part of its Great Americans series.

== History of the monument ==
=== Planning and early construction under Korczak Ziolkowski (1931–1982) ===
Henry Standing Bear (Mato Naji), an Oglala Lakota chief, and well-known statesman and elder in the Native American community, recruited and commissioned Polish-American sculptor Korczak Ziolkowski to build the Crazy Horse Memorial in the Black Hills of South Dakota. In October 1931, Luther Standing Bear, Henry's older brother, wrote to sculptor Gutzon Borglum, who was carving the heads of four American presidents at Mount Rushmore. Luther suggested that it would be "most fitting to have the face of Crazy Horse sculpted there. Crazy Horse is the real patriot of the Sioux tribe and the only one worthy to place by the side of Washington and Lincoln." Borglum never replied. Thereafter, Henry Standing Bear began a campaign to have Borglum carve an image of Crazy Horse on Mount Rushmore. In summer of 1935, Standing Bear, frustrated over the stalled Crazy Horse project, wrote to James H. Cook, a long time friend of Chief Red Cloud's, "I am struggling hopelessly with this because I am without funds, no employment and no assistance from any Indian or White."

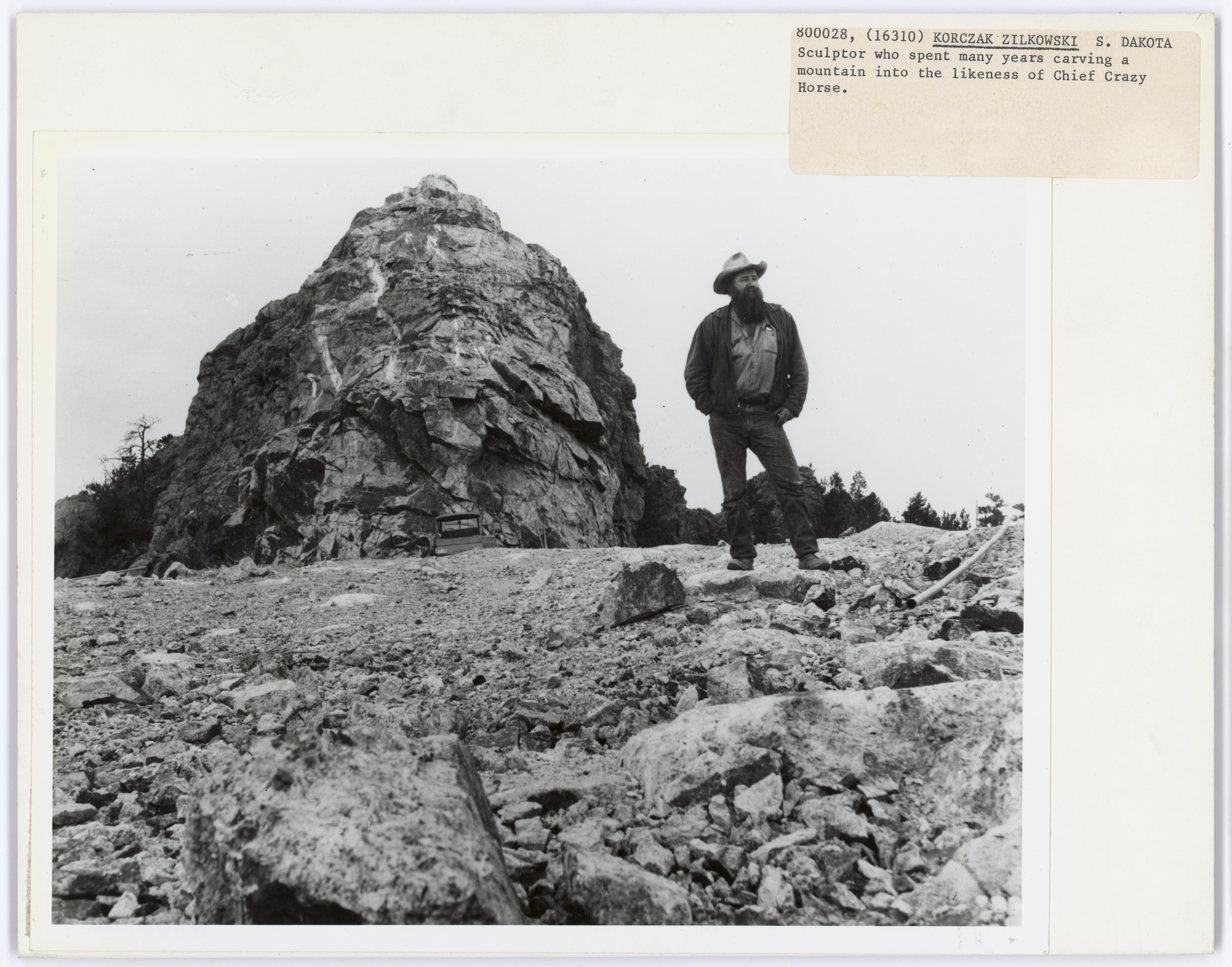
Sculptor Korczak Ziolkowski posing in front of the construction site in the 1950s

On November 7, 1939, Henry Standing Bear wrote to the Polish-American sculptor Korczak Ziolkowski, who worked on Mount Rushmore under Gutzon Borglum. He informed the sculptor, "My fellow chiefs and I would like the white man to know that the red man has great heroes, too." Standing Bear also wrote a letter to Undersecretary Oscar Chapman of the Department of the Interior, offering all his own fertile 900 acres (365 ha) in exchange for the barren mountain for the purpose of paying honor to Crazy Horse. The government responded positively, and the U.S. Forest Service, responsible for the land, agreed to grant a permit for the use of the land, with a commission to oversee the project. Standing Bear chose not to seek government funds and relied instead upon influential Americans interested in the welfare of the American Indian to privately fund the project.

In the spring of 1940, Ziolkowski spent three weeks with Standing Bear at Pine Ridge, South Dakota, discussing land ownership issues and learning about Crazy Horse and the Lakota way of life. According to Ziolkowski, "Standing Bear grew very angry when he spoke of the broken Treaty of Fort Laramie (1868). That was the one I'd read about in which the President promised the Black Hills would belong to the Indians forever. I remember how his old eyes flashed out of that dark mahogany face, then he would shake his head and fall silent for a long while."

On June 3, 1948, Ziolkowski detonated the first blast on the mountain, and the memorial was dedicated to the Native American people. Work continued slowly over the next few decades since Ziolkowski refused to accept government grants. Instead, as he stated on a 1961 guest appearance on the TV show To Tell the Truth, he raised money for the project by charging seventy-five cents admission to the monument work area.

=== Construction under Ruth Ziolkowski (1982–2014) ===
After Ziolkowski died in 1982 at age 74, his widow Ruth Ziolkowski took charge of the sculpture, overseeing work on the project as CEO from the 1980s to the 2010s. Ruth Ziolkowski focused on the completion of Crazy Horse's face first, instead of the horse as her husband had originally planned. She believed that Crazy Horse's face, once completed, would increase the sculpture's draw as a tourist attraction, which would provide additional funding. She also oversaw the staff, which included seven of her children.

Sixteen years later, in 1998, the head and face of Crazy Horse were completed and dedicated; Crazy Horse's eyes are 17 feet (5.2 m) wide, while his head is 87 feet (27 m) high. Ruth Ziolkowski and seven of the Ziolkowskis' 10 children carried on work at the memorial. Daughter Monique Ziolkowski, herself a sculptor, modified some of her father's plans to ensure that the weight of the outstretched arm was supported sufficiently. The foundation commissioned reports from two engineering firms in 2009 to help guide completion of the project. Work commenced on the horse after two years of careful planning and measurements. Since the completion of the head and face, much of the monument's sculpting work has been dedicated to the much larger horse portion.

Ruth Ziolkowski died on May 21, 2014, at the age of 87. Monique Ziolkowski became CEO and three of her siblings continued to work on the project, as well as three of the Ziolkowskis' grandsons, including Caleb, who has gone on to become the "chief mountain officer".

=== Construction since 2014 ===
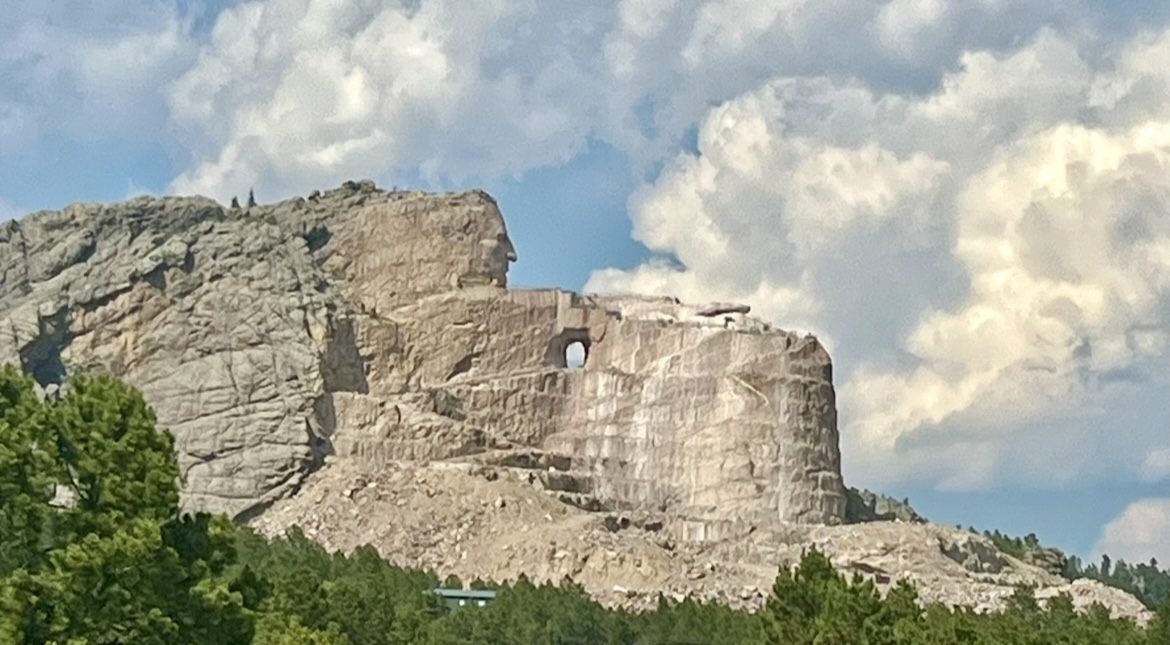
Progress on monument from 2020 (top) to 2024 (bottom), focusing on the outstretched left hand

With Monique Ziolkowski as CEO, work focused on finishing the outstretched left arm of Crazy Horse, in addition to expanding the on-site Indian University of North America, a joint-venture with Black Hills State University that has offered summer programs for university students of Native American descent since 2011. Monique Ziolkowski stepped down as CEO in 2021 to focus on artwork and other aspects of the memorial site, with the foundation eventually naming Whitney A. Rencountre II, who had held various education-based positions including associate director of the Indian University, as its new CEO in August 2022.

The memorial celebrated its 75th anniversary in 2023. Crazy Horse's left hand was finished by 2024, with finishing work commencing in summer 2024 on the backside of his arm to make way for a new tower crane designed to reach all parts of the carving. The Liebherr crane, with an estimated cost of $5.2 million, was made possible by several anonymous donations and was procured in 2023 through Morrow Equipment, with all parts weighing 25,000 pounds (11,000 kg) combined, and was shipped to the mountain on 17 truck beds. The crane was assembled by the summer of 2025 and has been used by the crew to remove granite cutout blocks and move equipment in dramatically reduced time. This in turn has allowed for more focus on carving, which has moved on to the horse's mane and Crazy Horse's right shoulder. In 2026, a second crane from Liebherr and Morrow was planned to further speed up construction.

== Geology of the monument site ==
The Crazy Horse Monument is carved into the Harney Peak leucogranite on Thunder Mountain, a plutonic igneous rock emplaced during the Proterozoic and the same granite that Mount Rushmore is carved into. The granite is famous for its pegmatites. The main intrusion forms a composite mostly undeformed dome and contains numerous dikes and sills. The granite's emplacement was associated with contact metamorphism and metasomatism in the country rock surrounding the monument composed mostly of sillimanite- and staurolite-grade graywackes, shales, quartzites, and amphibolites. Isotopic data indicate the magma source-rocks for the leuogranite were shallow midcrustal Proterozoic and Archean metapelites during the Trans-Hudson orogeny and dated to 1.715 ± 0.003Ga from U-Pb and Th-Pb monazite dating.

The leucogranite itself is peraluminous S-type granite mainly containing plagioclase (albite to oligoclase composition), perthic microcline, quartz (myrmekitic), and muscovite. Accessory minerals including tourmaline, biotite, beryl, garnet, and apatite. The average whole-rock geochemistry is as follows:

Average Composition of Harney Peak Granite (n = 7)
Oxide	wt.%
SiO_{2}	74.79
TiO_{2}	0.06
Al_{2}O_{3}	14.81
Fe_{2}O_{3}	0.21
FeO	0.44
MnO	0.05
MgO	0.12
CaO	0.62
Na_{2}O	3.74
K_{2}O	4.44
H_{2}O+	0.61
H_{2}O−	0.07
P_{2}O_{5}	0.08
F	0.04
CO_{2}	0.07
Sum	100.12

The on-site Indian University of North America and Indian Museum of North America are separated from the Crazy Horse Monument by a geologic fault.

== Completed vision ==
A model of the planned colossal sculpture, with the progress of the Crazy Horse Memorial in the background (August 2009)

At the time construction started in 1948, Ziolkowski estimated the work would be complete in 30 years. As of 2022, there was no timeline for when the monument would be completed; however, the hand, arm, shoulder, hairline, and top of the horse's head were estimated to be finished by 2037.

The memorial is to be the centerpiece of an educational/cultural center, to include a satellite campus of the University of South Dakota, with a classroom building and residence hall, made possible by a $2.5 million donation in 2007 from T. Denny Sanford, a philanthropist from Sioux Falls, South Dakota. It is called the Indian University of North America and the Indian Museum of North America. The current visitor complex will anchor the center.

== Fundraising ==
The memorial is a non-profit undertaking, and does not accept federal or state funding. The Memorial Foundation finances the project by charging fees for its visitor centers, earning revenue from its gift shops, and receiving private contributions. Ziolkowski felt the project was more than just a mountain carving, and he feared that his plans for the broader educational and cultural goals of the memorial would be overturned by federal involvement. As of 2024, the foundation has accrued $128 million in assets, and earned $14.5 million annually in revenue.

T. Denny Sanford donated $5 million to the memorial, to be paid $1 million a year for five years as matching donations were raised, specifically to further work on the horse's head.

Paul and Donna "Muffy" Christen of Huron, South Dakota announced in July 2010 they were donating $5 million in two installments to an endowment to support the operation of the satellite campus. It holds classes in math, English, and American Indian studies courses for college credit, as well as outreach classes. The memorial foundation has awarded more than $1.2 million in scholarships, with the majority going to Native students within South Dakota.

The Memorial foundation began its first national fund drive in October 2006. The goal was to raise $16.5 million by 2011. The first planned project was a $1.4 million dormitory to house 40 American Indian students who would work as interns at the memorial.

== Opposition ==
Ziolkowski envisioned the monument as a metaphoric tribute to the spirit of Crazy Horse and Native Americans. However, some Native Americans consider the memorial an insult to Crazy Horse, who resisted being photographed and was deliberately buried where his grave would not be found.

Elaine Quiver, a descendant of one of Crazy Horse's aunts, said in 2003 that the elder Standing Bear should not have independently petitioned Ziolkowski to create the memorial, because Lakota culture dictates consensus from family members for such a decision, which was not obtained before the first rock was dynamited in 1948. She said:

They don't respect our culture because we didn't give permission for someone to carve the sacred Black Hills where our burial grounds are. They were there for us to enjoy and they were there for us to pray. But it wasn't meant to be carved into images, which is very wrong for all of us. The more I think about it, the more it's a desecration of our Indian culture. Not just Crazy Horse, but all of us.

Seth Big Crow, whose great-grandmother was an aunt of Crazy Horse's, said he wondered about the millions of dollars which the Ziolkowski family had collected from the visitor center and shops associated with the memorial, and "the amount of money being generated by his ancestor's name". He said:

Or did it give them free hand to try to take over the name and make money off it as long as they're alive and we're alive? When you start making money rather than to try to complete the project, that's when, to me, it's going off in the wrong direction.

Other traditional Lakota oppose the memorial. In his 1972 autobiography, John Fire Lame Deer, a Lakota medicine man, said: "The whole idea of making a beautiful wild mountain into a statue of him is a pollution of the landscape. It is against the spirit of Crazy Horse." In a 2001 interview, Lakota activist Russell Means said: "Imagine going to the holy land in Israel, whether you're a Christian or a Jew or a Muslim, and start carving up the mountain of Zion. It's an insult to our entire being."

In her 2019 New Yorker article, 'Who Speaks for Crazy Horse?', author Brooke Jarvis states, "On Pine Ridge and in Rapid City, I heard a number of Lakota say that the memorial has become a tribute not to Crazy Horse but to Ziolkowski and his family".

Jim Bradford, an Oglala Sioux rancher and former member of the South Dakota Senate also criticized the project saying "one non-Indian family has become millionaires off our people".

== See also ==
- List of colossal sculptures in situ
- List of tallest statues
- List of the tallest statues in the United States
