= Ruth Ziolkowski =

American executive and CEO (1926 – 2014)

Ruth Carolyn Ziolkowski (née Ross; June 26, 1926 – May 21, 2014) was an American executive and CEO of the Crazy Horse Memorial, a South Dakota monument dedicated to Crazy Horse which was designed by her late husband, Korczak Ziolkowski.

Ruth Ziolkowski took over the responsibility for the construction of the monument following the death of her husband in 1982.

Korczak Ziolkowski had been focusing on the completion of Crazy Horse's horse at the time of his death. Ruth Ziolkowski changed course, ordering that Crazy Horse's face be completed instead. She hoped that the monument would become a tourist magnet once his 87.5-foot face was finished, providing needed funding for the project. Her prediction proved correct upon the face's completion in 1998 and the statue quickly became one of South Dakota's top tourist attractions. She oversaw the growth, expansion and progress at the Crazy Horse Memorial from the 1980s to the 2010s.

== Biography ==
=== Early life ===
She was born Ruth Ross to Frank and Lydia Ross on June 26, 1926, in West Hartford, Connecticut. She first met Polish American sculptor and artist Korczak Ziolkowski, when she was 13 years old in their native West Hartford. She and a friend showed up at his house to get an autograph from film actor Richard Bennett who was visiting him.

Later, Ross was among a group of student volunteers who helped Ziolkowski create a sculpture of Noah Webster, the creator of the Webster's Dictionary and former resident of West Hartford, over the course of two years. The Webster statue now stands at the West Hartford Library.

=== Crazy Horse Memorial ===
Korczak previously helped with the completion of Mount Rushmore during the 1930s. He had been approached by Chief Henry Standing Bear of the Lakota about a potential project. Ziolkowski designed a huge statue of Crazy Horse, an Oglala Lakota chief who helped defeat George Armstrong Custer at the Battle of Little Bighorn in 1876. He acquired Thunderhead Mountain in the Black Hills, located just 17 miles from Mount Rushmore, from the U.S. federal government, as the site for his monument. He arrived at the site on May 3, 1947, and commenced construction of the Crazy Horse Memorial in 1948.

Ruth Ross arrived at the Crazy Horse Memorial in 1948 with a group of Connecticut youths who had volunteered to help Ziolkowski with the project during his pre-planning stages. A professional, as well as a personal, relationship soon developed. Ziolkowski and Ross married on November 23, 1950, on Thanksgiving. He was 42 years old, while she was 24 years old at the time of the wedding. The marriage produced ten children who were born in their small cabin where the family lived.

While Korczak focused on the creation of Crazy Horse from the 1940s to the 1980s, Ruth handled much of the day-to-day operations of the Crazy Horse site from her office in the family's cabin. Ruth and her husband jointly compiled three books of material containing measurements and plans for the statue. She handled the finances and bookkeeping. She handled press inquires, staffed their visitors center, and acquired the equipment and materials needed to carve the sculpture. She handled these tasks while raising ten children.

Korczak Ziolkowski declined financial support from the U.S. federal government, believing that it might offend Native American groups. In order to raise money during the early years of the project, Ruth Ziolkowski operated a timber mill and a dairy farm. She later served as the chairman of the board and chief executive officer for the Crazy Horse Memorial Foundation board of directors.

Korczak Ziolkowski died on October 20, 1982, 34 years after beginning work on the Crazy Horse Memorial. He was buried at the base of Thunderhead Mountain where his sculpture was created. Ruth sought to keep on the project on task in collaboration with her children and the Crazy Horse Memorial Foundation. She utilized the three books of instructions and measurements, which she and her husband had compiled, to continue construction of the Crazy Horse Monument, and took charge of the staff, who included seven of their ten children.

Ruth Ziolkowski oversaw all work on the sculpture from the 1980s until her death in 2014. She decided that Crazy Horse's face should be completed first, rather than the horse, as her husband had originally intended. Ruth Ziolkowski reasoned that Crazy Horse's face would increase tourism and provide an increased source of income to continue carving the mountain. The face was completed in 1998. She sought to expand the 1,000-acre complex's public facilities and increase its outreach to the Native American community. She has been credited with expanding the Indian Museum of North America, located on the grounds of the memorial, as well as establishing the Indian University of North America, which was founded in 2009. The Indian University was set to host thirty-two students during the summer of 2014.

Work commenced on the horse's head after two years of planning and measurements. Ruth Ziolkowski explained some of the challenges of carving the horse head at the time, "The first hurdle was one of logistics – we have taken considerable time to measure and calculate the best approach to what will be an extraordinary and lengthy undertaking. We've been mindful of Korczak's good advice to 'Go slowly so you do it right' as well as the old adage about the wisdom of measuring something six times before you cut it once."

Ruth Ziolkowski could not provide an exact deadline for the projected completion date, noting the complexities of weather, money and labor needed for the sculpture. She believed that the sculpture, especially the horse's head, could take decades to complete. She believed that her late husband would be "absolutely thrilled" with the progress on the sculpture from the 1980s to the 2010s.

=== Later life, death and legacy ===
Ruth Ziolkowski was diagnosed with cancer in March 2014. She continued to oversee the Crazy Horse project until April 2014, when she entered a hospice. She died on May 21, 2014, in Rapid City, South Dakota, where she had been receiving treatment, aged 87. She was survived by nine of her children: John, Dawn, Adam, Jadwiga, Casimir, Mark, Joel, Monique and Marinka; twenty-three grandchildren; and eleven great-grandchildren. Her daughter, Anne, had predeceased her in 2011. Thousands of people attended Ziolkowski's memorial service, which was held at the Crazy Horse Monument on May 27, 2014. South Dakota Governor Dennis Daugaard requested that flags be flown at half-staff in her honor. She was buried in a stone coffin at the base of Thunderhead Mountain next to her husband.

Following her death, Ziolkowski was succeeded as leader of the Crazy Horse Memorial by three equal successors as part of a succession plan: Laurie Becvar, the president and chief operating officer of the Crazy Horse Memorial Foundation, and two of Ziolkowski's daughters, Jadwiga and Monique.

== Honors and awards ==
Ziolkowski was inducted into the South Dakota Hall of Fame in 1988 for her contributions to Arts and Entertainment. Her husband was also posthumously inducted into the Hall of Fame that same year. She received an honorary degree from the South Dakota School of Mines and Technology for her work. The same college also bestowed a public service award on the entire Ziolkowski family in 1998.
