= I Remain Alive =

2000 book

- Author: Ruth J. Heflin
- Genre: Sociology
- Publisher: Syracuse University Press
- Publication date: 2000
- ISBN: 978-0-8156-2805-7

I Remain Alive: the Sioux Literary Renaissance is a scholarly book written by Ruth J. Heflin and published by Syracuse University Press in 2000.

I Remain Alive focuses on five Sioux, or Oyate (meaning "the People"), writers from what is often called the Transitional Period for American Indian writers. The book provides a perspective for non-Indians on what life was like for the different Sioux tribes in the late 1800s before discussing how these five writers—Charles Alexander Eastman (Ohiyesa), Luther Standing Bear, Zitkala Sa (Gertrude Simmons Bonnin), Ella Cara Deloria, and Nicholas Black Elk—used their connections between the European American dominant culture and their own Lakota or Nakota American Indian cultures to create written works that both enlighten European American readers and preserve some Oyate traditions. This interweaving of cultures in such texts is the basis for Heflin's arguments that these writers, rather than struggling to decide which of these two worlds they lived in, actually led interstitial lives that allowed them to go back and forth between the two, rather than just live in "liminal" edges, as many scholars choose to believe.

Heflin also discusses how these five writers, who wrote the majority of written works published by Indians at this time and many of whom were popular public speakers, were probable influences on the rise of American literary Modernism.

The book also challenges Kenneth Lincoln's scholarly book, Native American Renaissance, which describes the flourishing of publications by American Indian authors in the 1970s as a "renaissance," seemingly overlooking contributions of American Indian authors that preceded N. Scott Momaday's publication of his Pulitzer Prize-winning novel, House Made of Dawn.

I Remain Alive is one of the first scholarly monographs that takes the time to examine the oral literary traditions that influenced and shaped the works written by American Indian writers of a particular Indian nation.
