= Korczak Ziolkowski =

American designer and sculptor (1908–1982)

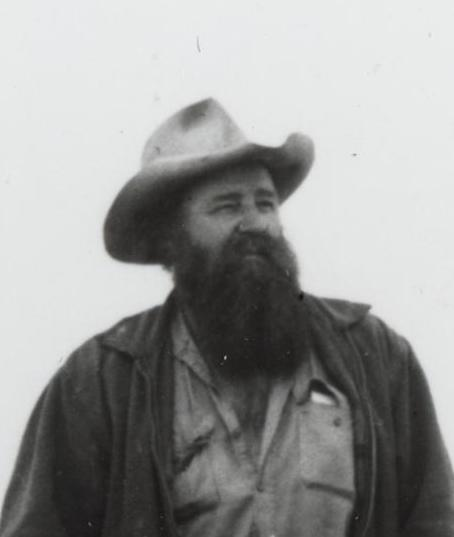
- Sculptor Korczak Ziolkowski in 1950s
- Born: Korczak Ziółkowski; September 6, 1908; Boston, Massachusetts, U.S.
- Died: October 20, 1982 (aged 74); Sturgis, South Dakota, U.S.
- Known for: Sculptor
- Notable work: Crazy Horse Memorial; Mount Rushmore Memorial
- Spouse: Ruth Ziolkowski (1950–1982; his death)
- Children: 10
- Website: Korczak – Storyteller in Stone

Korczak Ziolkowski (Polish: Korczak Ziółkowski; September 6, 1908 – October 20, 1982) was an American artist and sculptor known for designing the Crazy Horse Memorial.

== Early life ==
Ziolkowski was born September 6, 1908, in Boston to Polish parents. Orphaned at the age of one when both his parents (Anna and Józef) died in a boating accident, he grew up in a series of foster homes, and was raised by an Irish boxer. Although he never received any formal art training, his gifts as a sculptor began to show at an early age. After putting himself through Rindge Technical School, he became an apprentice to a Boston ship maker.

He began to carve wood and by the age of 20 had become an accomplished furniture maker. His first marble sculpture, made in 1932, honored Judge Frederick Pickering Cabot, who had inspired him as a child growing up in the rough neighborhoods of Boston. Ziolkowski moved to New Britain, Connecticut, to begin life as a professional artist, and began to sell commissioned sculptures throughout New England and New York. In 1932, his sculpture of dictionary writer Noah Webster was unveiled in West Hartford, Connecticut.

In 1939, Ziolkowski was hired as a sculptor's assistant by Gutzon Borglum on his Mount Rushmore project. According to Lincoln Borglum, Gutzon's son, he was unhappy, having expected to be made the primary assistant. Instead, Lincoln was the primary assistant, and when Ziolkowski argued about his orders, Borglum fired him by telegram. A fistfight between Lincoln and Ziolkowski had to be broken up.

His sculpture of Ignacy Jan Paderewski won first prize at the 1939 New York World's Fair. The resulting fame, as well as his familiarity with the Black Hills, prompted several Lakota Chiefs, including Lakota elder Henry Standing Bear, to write to him about a monument honoring Crazy Horse. Chief Henry Standing Bear wrote, "My fellow chiefs and I would like the white man to know the red man has great heroes, too."

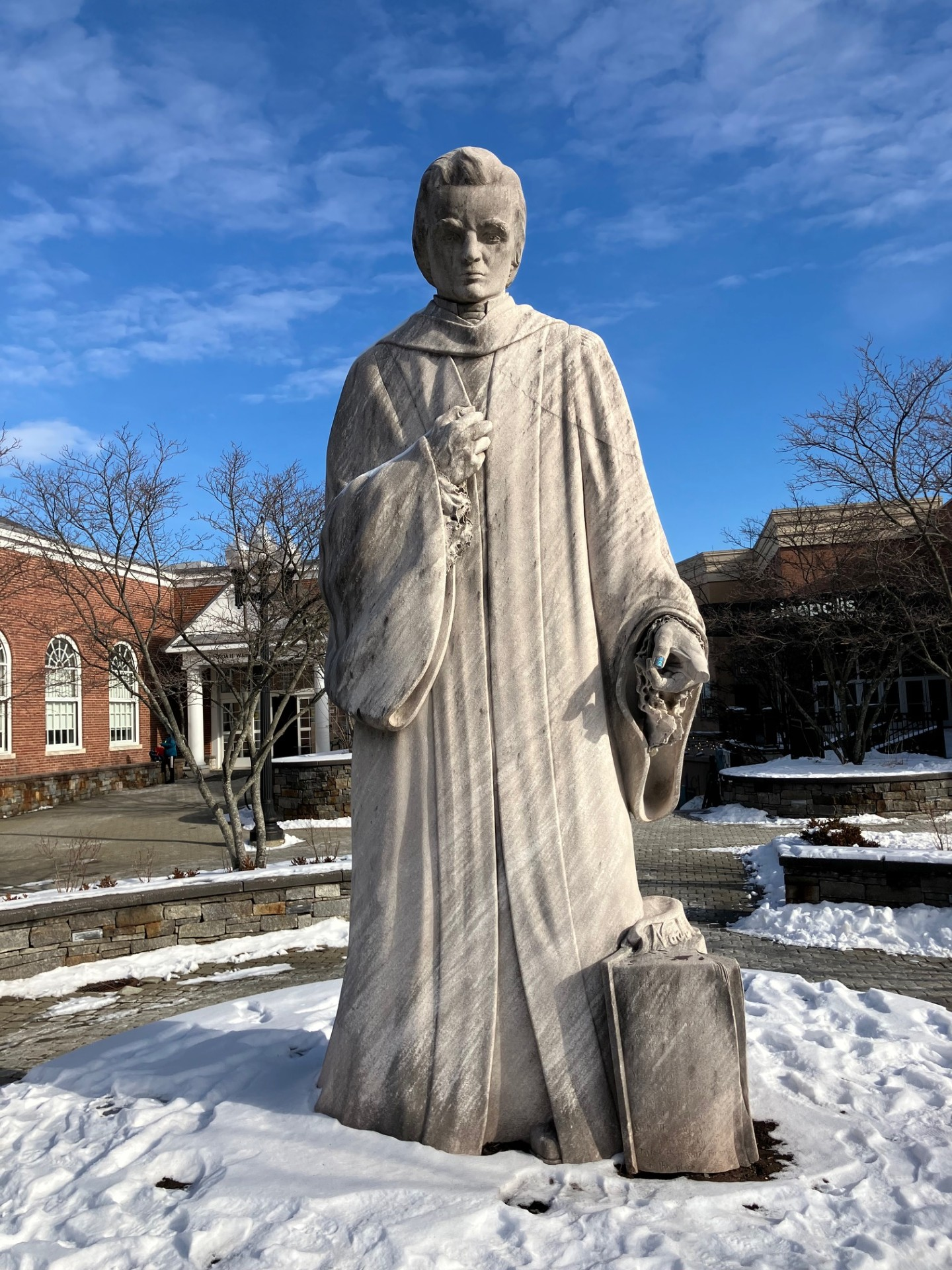
Noah Webster Sculpture by Korczak Ziolkowski in West Hartford, Connecticut installed in 1932

Ziolkowski met with the leaders shortly afterward and began planning a monument. Over the next few years, he conducted research and began planning the sculpture. He also met Ruth Ross, a young art enthusiast, who would later become his second wife. He put the project on hold when the United States entered World War II. He volunteered for service and joined the United States Army on May 17, 1943. He was wounded in 1944 at Omaha Beach in Normandy. He was discharged as a sergeant on November 5, 1945.

In 1947 Ziolkowski moved to the Black Hills and began to search for a suitable mountain for his sculpture. He thought the Wyoming Tetons would be the best choice, where the rock would be better for carving, but the Lakota wanted the memorial in the sacred Black Hills on a 600-foot (180 m)-high mountain. The monument was expected to be the largest sculpture in the world. When completed, it would be 563 feet (172 m) high by 641 feet (195 m) long. Crazy Horse's head would be large enough to contain all the 60-foot (18 m)-high heads of the Presidents at Mount Rushmore.

On June 3, 1948, the first blast was made, and the memorial was dedicated to the Native American people. In 1950, Ziolkowski met Ruth Ross, 18 years his junior, who was a volunteer at the monument. She became Ziolkowski's second wife that year. Work continued slowly, since he refused to accept government grants. Instead, as he stated on a 1961 guest appearance on the TV show To Tell the Truth, he raised money for the project by charging seventy-five cents admission to the monument work area.

== Last years and death ==
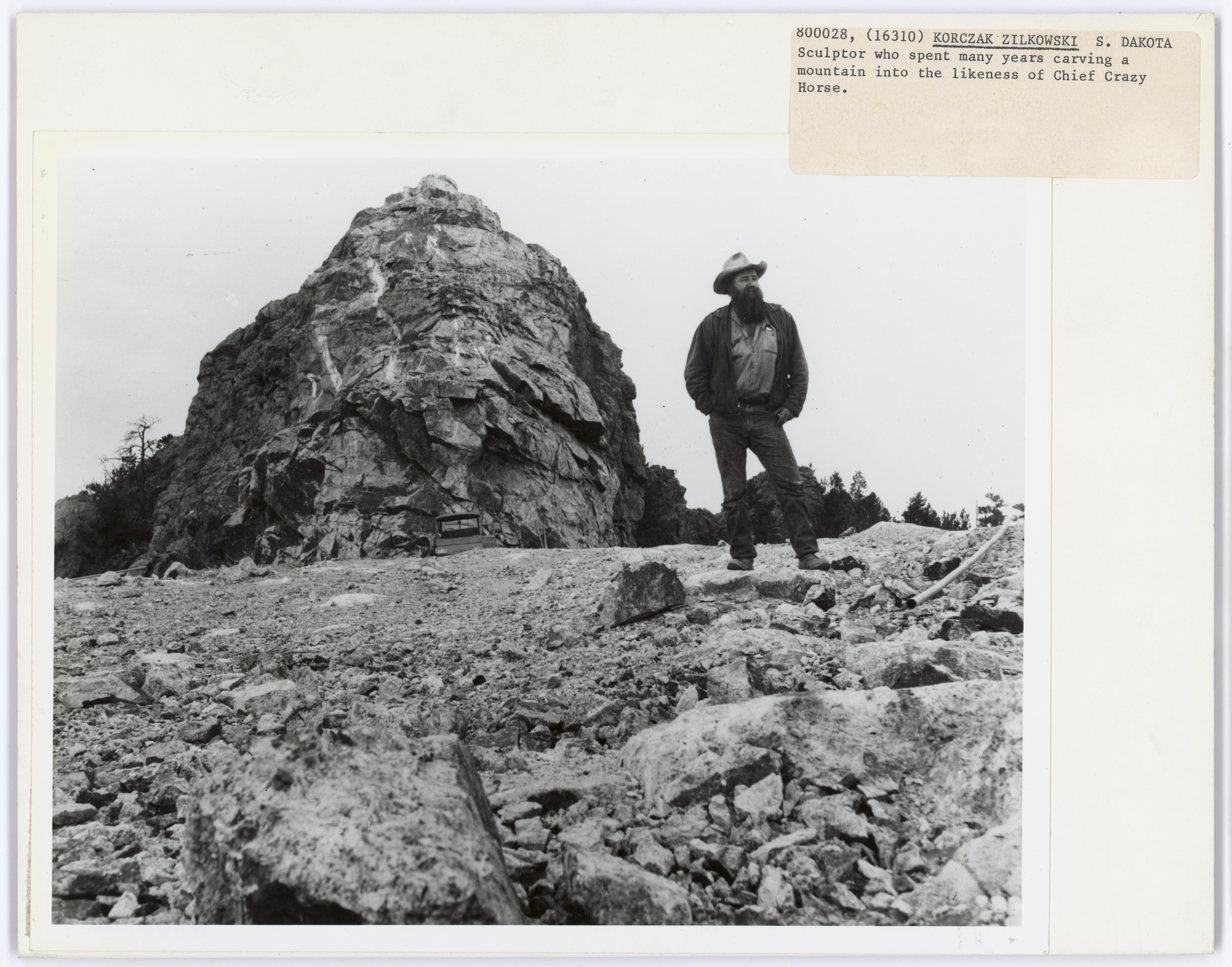
Ziółkowski in the Black Hills

Ziolkowski continued his work until he died of acute pancreatitis in 1982 at the age of 74 in Sturgis, South Dakota. He was buried in an impressive tomb that he had built, with a huge steel plate on which he cut the words, "Korczak; Storyteller in Stone; May His Remains; Be Left Unknown" at the base of the mountain. After his death, his widow, Ruth Ziolkowski, took over the project as director of the Crazy Horse Memorial Foundation.

Ruth Ziolkowski died May 21, 2014, aged 87. All 10 of their children, and two of their grandchildren, have continued the carving of the monument or are active in the Crazy Horse Memorial Foundation. The rocks that are blasted away are placed in a rock crusher and used for the roads at the complex.

Plans are for the Crazy Horse Memorial site to become a university campus and cultural complex celebrating the Native Americans of North America.

== See also ==
- List of Polish Americans
- Aleksandra Ziółkowska-Boehm – his niece

== Sources ==
- Ziółkowska-Boehm, Aleksandra, Nie tylko Ameryka (Not Only America), Warsaw, 1992; ISBN 83-900358-1-2.
- Ziółkowska-Boehm, A., The Roots Are Polish, Toronto, 2004; ISBN 0-920517-05-6
- Ziółkowska-Boehm, A., Otwarta rana Ameryki (America's Open Wound), Bielsko Biala, 2007; ISBN 978-83-7167-556-0
- Ziółkowska-Boehm, A., Open Wounds: A Native American Heritage, Nemsi Books, Pierpont, S.D., 2009; ISBN 978-0-9821427-5-2
- Thomas Powers, The Killing of Crazy Horse, Alfred A.Knopf, 2010 ISBN 978-0-375-41446-6
- Korczak – Storyteller in Stone, crazyhorsememorial.org
