= Black Elk Speaks =

1932 book by John Neihardt

- Author: John G. Neihardt
- Language: English
- Publication date: 1932 (original cover)
- Publication place: United States
- Media type: Print

Black Elk Speaks is a 1932 book by John G. Neihardt, an American poet and writer, who relates the story of Black Elk, an Oglala Lakota medicine man. Black Elk spoke in Lakota and Black Elk's son, Ben Black Elk, who was present during the talks, translated his father's words into English. Neihardt made notes during these talks which he later used as the basis for his book.

The prominent psychologist Carl Jung read the book in the 1930s and urged its translation into German; in 1955, it was published as Ich rufe mein Volk (I Call My People).

Reprinted in the US in 1961, with a 1988 edition named Black Elk Speaks: Being the Life Story of a Holy Man of the Oglala Sioux, as told through John G. Neihardt (Flaming Rainbow) and a State University of New York Press 2008 Premier Edition annotated by Lakota scholar Raymond DeMallie, the book has found an international audience. However, the book has come under fire for what critics describe as inaccurate representations of Lakota culture and beliefs.

== Background ==
In the summer of 1930, as part of his research into the Native American perspective on the Ghost Dance movement, the poet and writer John G. Neihardt, already the Nebraska poet laureate, received the necessary permission from the Bureau of Indian Affairs to go to the Pine Ridge Reservation. Accompanied by his two daughters, he went to meet an Oglala holy man named Black Elk. His intention was to talk to someone who had participated in the Ghost Dance. For the most part, the reservations were not then open to visitors. At age 13, Black Elk had also been part of the Battle of the Little Big Horn, and he survived the 1890 Wounded Knee Massacre.

Neihardt recounts that Black Elk invited him back for interviews. Flying Hawk served as their translator. Neihardt writes that Black Elk told him of his visions, including one in which he saw himself as a "sixth grandfather" - the spiritual representative of the earth and of mankind. Neihardt also states that Black Elk shared some of the Oglala rituals which he had performed as a healer, and that the two men developed a close friendship. Neihardt's daughter, Hilda Neihardt, says Black Elk adopted her, her sister, and their father as relatives, giving each of them Lakota names.

== Controversy ==
Though Black Elk was Oglala Lakota, the book was written by Neihardt, a non-Native. While the book is lauded by non-Native audiences, and has been inspirational to many New Age groups, some Lakota people and Native American scholars do not consider the book to be representative of Lakota beliefs. They have questioned the accuracy of the account, which has elements of a collaborative autobiography, spiritual text, and other genres. The Indiana University professor Raymond DeMallie, who has studied the Lakota by cultural and linguistic resources, published "The Sixth Grandfather" in 1985 including the original transcripts of the conversations with Black Elk, plus his own introduction, analysis and notes. He has questioned whether Neihardt's account is accurate and fully represents the views or words of Black Elk.

The primary criticism made by DeMallie and similar scholars is that Neihardt, as the author and editor, may have exaggerated or altered some parts of the story to make it more accessible and marketable to the intended white audience of the 1930s, or because he did not fully understand the Lakota context. Late twentieth-century editions of the book by Nebraska University Press have addressed this issue by entitling the book as Black Elk Speaks, as told through John G. Neihardt (aka "Flaming Rainbow").

== Publication data ==
- Black Elk Speaks, 1932, William Morrow & Company.
  - 1961 University of Nebraska Press edition with a new preface by Neihardt.
  - 1979 edition with an introduction by Vine Deloria, Jr.
  - 1988 edition: Black Elk Speaks: Being the Life Story of a Holy Man of the Oglala Sioux, as told through John G. Neihardt (Flaming Rainbow), ISBN 0-8032-8359-8.
  - 2000 edition with index: ISBN 0-8032-6170-5.
- Black Elk Speaks: Being the Life Story of a Holy Man of the Oglala Sioux, The Premier Edition, 2008, SUNY Press, Albany, NY, ISBN 978-1-4384-2540-5, with annotations by Raymond DeMallie, author of The Sixth Grandfather: Black Elk's Teachings Given to John G. Neihardt (1985). The premier edition by the State University of New York Press, under its Excelsior Editions, is the first annotated edition. It includes reproductions of the original illustrations by Standing Bear, with new commentary; new maps of the world of Black Elk Speaks; and a revised index.
- Black Elk Speaks: The Complete Edition, 2014, University of Nebraska Press.

=== Adaptation ===
The book was adapted into a play by Christopher Sergel, John G. Neihardt's Black Elk Speaks, in the 1970s where it was staged by the Folger Theatre in Washington, D.C., and then taken on a national tour in 1978, and later restaged in 1992 with a revised version. One staging of the play was presented by the American Indian Theater Company at the Tulsa Performing Arts Center on April 19, 1984, starring David Carradine as Black Elk and Will Sampson as Red Cloud. This performance was also the first paid acting role for Wes Studi.

Shortly after Sergel's death, his revised version of the play “Black Elk Speaks” opened in January 1995. A Denver Center Theatre Company production, its actors included Ned Romero and Peter Kelly Gaudreault.

== See also ==
- The red road
