= H. Glenn Penny =

American historian

H. Glenn Penny (born Stuttgart, Germany, 1964) is an American historian. His research has focused on histories that show the connections between peoples in German-speaking central Europe and the Americas. Penny is currently Professor and Henry J. Bruman Chair in German History at the University of California, Los Angeles.

== Education and career ==
Penny studied at the University of Colorado at Boulder (B.A. 1987, M.A. 1991) and holds a Ph.D. from the department of history, University of Illinois Urbana-Champaign. He was Assistant Professor of History at the University of Missouri–Kansas City, and then the University of Iowa, where he rose to Associate Professor and professor in the Department of History.

== Fellowships ==
Penny was a James Bryant Conant Fellow at the Minda de Gunzburg Center for European Studies at Harvard University and a 2017 Senior Fellow at the Berlin Institute for Advanced Study. He is a 2021 recipient of a John Simon Guggenheim Fellowship.

== Publications ==
Penny has written dozens of articles, edited two anthologies, and authored four books:

- Objects of Culture: Ethnology and Ethnographic Museums in Imperial Germany (Chapel Hill: The University of North Carolina Press, 2002).
- Kindred by Choice: Germans and American Indians since 1800 (Chapel Hill: The University of North Carolina Press, 2013)
- In Humboldt’s Shadow: A Tragic History of German Ethnology (Princeton: Princeton University Press, 2021).
- German History Unbound: 1750s to the Present (Cambridge: Cambridge University Press, 2022).

== Awards and recognitions ==
- Objects of Culture received the Charles Smith Award from the Southern Historical Association in 2004 and the William A. Douglass Prize in European Anthropology and Honorable Mention from the American Anthropological Association, 2003.
- Kindred by Choice received the German Academic Exchange Service (DAAD) Book Award, the Franz Steiner Book Award of the German Historical Institute, and was named a 2014 Choice Outstanding Academic Title.
