= Ben Black Elk =

Lakota actor and educator

- Born: May 17, 1899; Manderson, South Dakota
- Died: February 22, 1973 (aged 73); Manderson, South Dakota
- Known for: "The Fifth Face of Mount Rushmore"
- Parents: Black Elk (father); Kate Black Elk (mother)
- Relatives: Crazy Horse

Benjamin Black Elk (17 May 1899 – 22 February 1973) of the Oglala Lakota people was an American actor and educator known as the "fifth face" of Mount Rushmore. The son of Black Elk and Kate Black Elk, Benjamin played an uncredited role in the 1962 film How the West Was Won.

== Early life ==
Benjamin was the sixth in line to carry the name "Black Elk". Born in Manderson, South Dakota, Benjamin's early life was itinerant, and he was moved to Ivyland, Pennsylvania and lived with farmer Russell K. Edwards, attending the Carlisle Indian Industrial School from 10 October 1914 to 10 July 1917. His mother Kate Black Elk had already died in 1903. His father Black Elk, "practically blind" asked for his son's help in farming and in "care of his stock" in May 1917, but the younger Black Elk was not sent home until after his father died, due to lack of funds. In the 1930s he served as an interpreter for the interviews with his father that became John G. Neihardt's book "Black Elk Speaks". Baptized Catholic, he has said of himself, "I have led two lives–one as a Christian and one as a believer of the Indian religion."

== Life and career ==
In 1967, he testified before the United States Senate Committee on Labor and Public Welfare, Special Subcommittee on Indian Education, saying "We have good schools all right, but they are getting away from our culture so fast it isn't funny." He also contributed a whitepaper on the "Educational Needs of Pine Ridge Reservation". At the time, Senator George McGovern of South Dakota found it "notable" that the subcommittee had "chosen to hear from a number of Indian spokesmen" in its first hearings.

== Death and legacy ==
To honor the "unofficial greeter" at Mount Rushmore for 27 years, South Dakota's Tourism Bureau has awarded the Ben Black Elk Award for lifetime achievement in tourism annually since 1980. He is remembered as the most photographed indigenous person in the U.S.
