= Hilda Neihardt =

American lawyer

Hilda Neihardt (1916–2004) was one of her father John G. Neihardt's "comrades in adventure," and at the age of 15 accompanied him as "official observer" to meetings with Black Elk, the Lakota holy man whose life stories were the basis for her father's book, Black Elk Speaks and for her own later works.

She was born in Bancroft, Nebraska, on December 6, 1916, to her writer father and sculptor mother, Mona Martinsen. In 1920 her extended family moved to Branson, Missouri, in the Ozark Mountains, then to Springfield, Missouri and on to St. Louis, Missouri as her father's work changed.

Hilda Neihardt attended Southwest Missouri State Teachers' College in Springfield, Missouri, and Wayne State College in Wayne, Nebraska and received her undergraduate degree from the University of Nebraska.

After graduation, she worked for the Swiss Consulate in St. Louis, Missouri. In 1944, she left the Consulate to join the WAVES. While in the service, she sang with the Ray Charles Orchestra on the "Waves on Parade" radio program broadcast from Hunter College in New York City. At her request she transferred to Pasco, Washington, where she served as a control tower operator.

She married Albert J. Petri on April 4, 1944. They had three children: Gail Evelyn, born in 1946; Robin Neihardt, born in 1948; and Coralie Joyce, born in 1952. (Her son, Robin, took the Neihardt surname and used Petri as his middle name.)

In 1960, she entered the University of Missouri Law School in Columbia, Missouri, graduating with a JD degree in 1963. She was the first woman to practice law in Mid-Missouri. During her years in Columbia, Neihardt was instrumental in obtaining the land and doing the legal work for the creation of the Rock Bridge State Park.

After retiring from her law practice, Neihardt became very active in promoting her father's works. She wrote The End of the Dream and other Stories' and The Giving Earth as compilations that are representative of all Neihardt's writings. She authored "Black Elk Speaks and Flaming Rainbow" her personal memoirs of Black Elk and John Neihardt, and edited Black Elk Lives: Conversations with the Black Elk Family with Lori Utecht. Her last book, The Broidered Garment: The Love Story of Mona Martinsen and John G. Neihardt, was about her parents.

Neihardt received the first Word Sender Award from the John G. Neihardt Foundation in 1999. Her book, Black Elk Lives, was the non-fiction winner of the 2001 Nebraska Book Awards Program sponsored by The Nebraska Center for the Book. A special ceremony awarding her an honorary Doctorate of Humane Letters by Wayne State College was held in Indianapolis, Indiana on July 23, 2004.

Neihardt died December 27, 2004, at the home of her daughter in Coatesville, Indiana. She was 88.
