= War Paint Club =

Early 1900's Native American film organization

War Paint Club is a Native American film organization founded in the early 1900s by White Bird, a Cherokee, and her husband, Chief Yowlachie. The organization developed a system to locate Native Americans for early Hollywood directors that used unauthentic replacements.

== Formation ==
White Bird noticed that Native Americans were being replaced by "Imitation Indians" because directors instead choose ones of darker complexions. She insisted that "six real Indians" be used in these films but found out that none of them could be reached by telephone. This prompted the creation of the organization in hope for unity among Native actors who did not receive these roles. The members also included author Luther Standing Bear, who served as the club's "chief counselor". The club was governed by twelve different chief members as White Bird was involved in financing.

== Main purposes ==
The directors not being able to reach Native Americans that did not have telephones was solved by the club's "Scout" system. The directors were able to reach them through the new telephone numbers that White Bird set up through the club. Other than being a fundamental hub for Native actors, the club served as a way to promote the casting of the Native actors in non-stereotypical roles. The club allowed White Bird to deliver Native Americans to directors in large numbers without any location issues. Whereas White Bird and Chief Yowlachie's home became a casting center for Native actors alike. White Bird said that the club was helpful for these directors because being able to reach experienced Native actors were better for their films.
