= Julius Lips =

German ethnologist and sociologist (1895–1950)

Julius Ernst Lips (8 September 1895 – 21 January 1950) was a German ethnologist and sociologist.

== Biography ==
Julius Ernst Lips was born in to the family of a railroad worker. After completing high school, Lips entered the University of Leipzig and joined the German Social Democratic Party. With the outbreak of World War I, he was mobilized and fought on the Eastern Front. He returned from the front after being wounded in 1916 and continued his studies at the University of Leipzig. In 1919, Lips received a doctorate in psychology and anthropology, and in 1925 he received a second doctorate (law). In the same year he married Eva Lips, née Wiegandt. In 1926, Julius Lips received his habilitation at the University of Cologne and became a lecturer in ethnology and sociology, and from 1929 was a professor. In 1928, Lips became curator of the Rautenstrauch-Jösta ethnological museum and from 1930 was its director, replacing Fritz Graebner in this post. Between 1929 and 1935, Lips made several research trips to Europe, Africa and North America.

In 1933, Lips resigned for political reasons and was persecuted for speaking out against the Nazis racial theories. He was dismissed from his post as museum director, the Prussian Minister of the Interior revoked his teaching license, the University of Leipzig refused him a doctorate in 1938, and his German citizenship was later revoked and his assets were confiscated. In 1934, Lips emigrated to the United States. With the help of Franz Boas, Lips obtained a temporary teaching position at Columbia University. He then taught at Howard University and The New School for Social Research. In the United States he was involved in the anti-Nazi movement and was a member of the Council for a Democratic Germany. From 1940 he was a member of the faculty of The New School for Social Research. In 1947, he conducted fieldwork among the Sioux Indians of South Dakota and the Ojibwe of northern Minnesota.

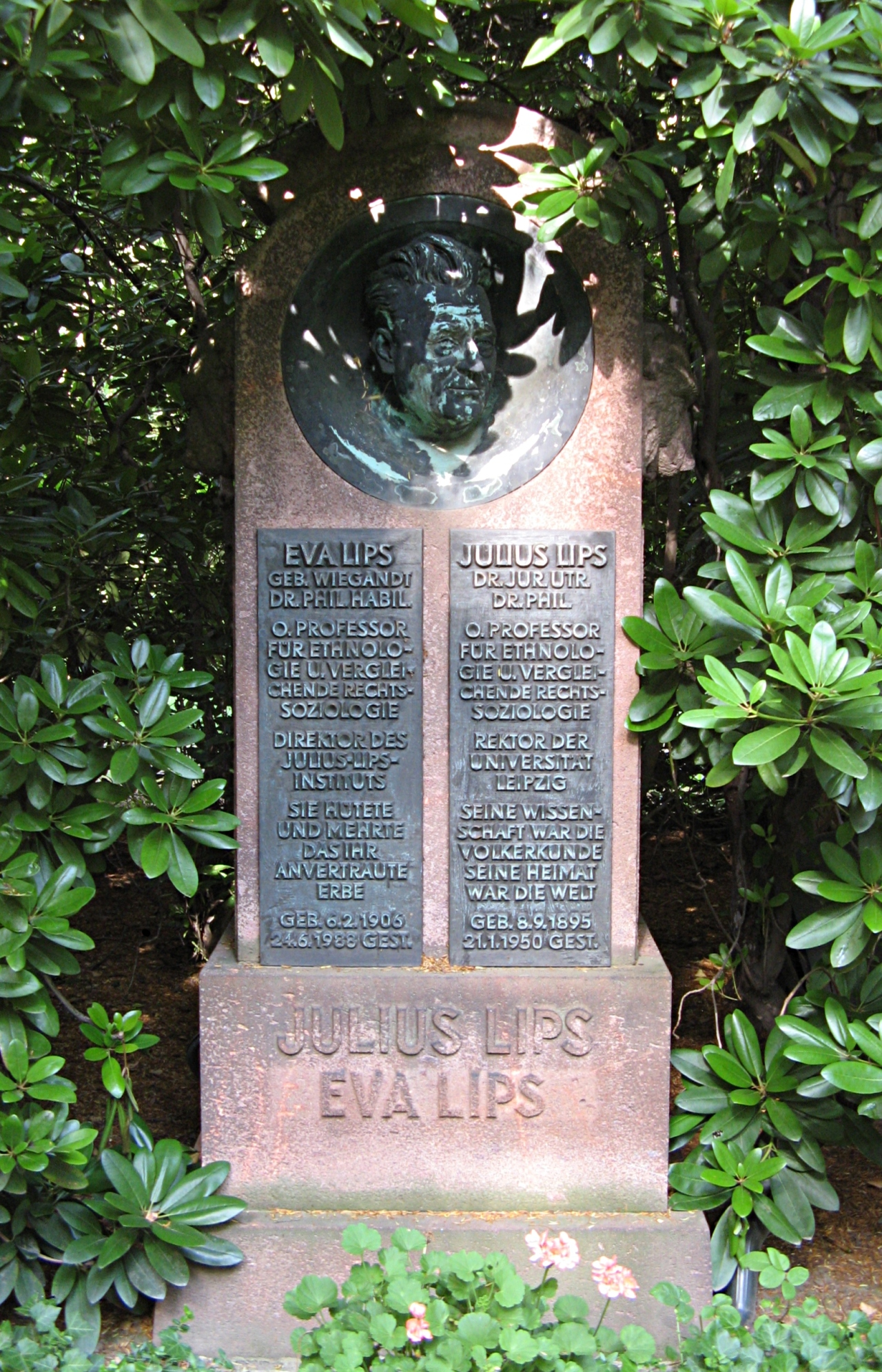
Gravestone of Julius Lips and his wife Eva at the Leipzig South Cemetery

In 1948, Lips returned to Germany. Despite an offer to resume teaching in Cologne, he decided to come to Leipzig. In 1949, he became professor of ethnology and comparative legal sociology and rector of the University of Leipzig.

== Selected works ==
- Einleitung in die vergleichende Völkerkunde. Lorentz, Leipzig 1930 (Digitalisat).
- The Savage Hits Back, or the White Man Through Native Eyes. Dickson, London 1937 (Digitalisat).
  - deutsche Fassung, mit Eva Lips: Der Weiße im Spiegel der Farbigen. Seemann, Leipzig 1983; Hanser, München 1984.
- Tents in the Wilderness. Lippincott, Philadelphia/New Yorck 1942.
  - deutsch: Zelte in der Wildnis. Indianerleben in Labrador. Danubia-Verlag, Wien 1946; häufige Neuauflagen bis 1985, auch mit Nachwort von Eva Lips und Illustrationen.
- The Origin of Things. Wyn, New Yorck 1947.
  - deutsch: Vom Ursprung der Dinge. Eine Kulturgeschichte des Menschen. Verlag Volk und Buch, Leipzig 1951.
- Die Erntevölker, eine wichtige Phase in der Entwicklung der menschlichen Geschichte. Rektoratsrede am 31. Oktober 1949 in der Kongresshalle zu Leipzig. Akademie-Verlag, Berlin 1953.
