= Standing Bear (Mató Nájin) =

Standing Bear (in Lakota, Mató Nájin) was a Minneconjou Lakota. He is also referred to as Stephen Standing Bear. Standing Bear is perhaps best known for his artwork, including illustrating the 1932 edition of Black Elk Speaks.

Standing Bear was born in 1859. His father died when he was four, and he lived with his mother, sister, grandparents, and uncle. He was part of the Battle of Little Big Horn, attending the Sun Dance before the battle.

His wife and baby daughter were killed at the Battle of Wounded Knee, a massacre in 1890. He was on tour with Buffalo Bill's Wild West at the time, in Vienna. During the tour, he met Louise, who he would later marry. Louise and her parents later immigrated to the United States, living at the Pine Ridge Reservation. His mixed marriage faced criticism.

He died in 1933. Artist Arthur Amiotte is one of his great-grandsons.
