= Black Elk =

Oglala Lakota leader (1863–1950)

Servant of God Nicholas Black Elk Heȟáka Sápa
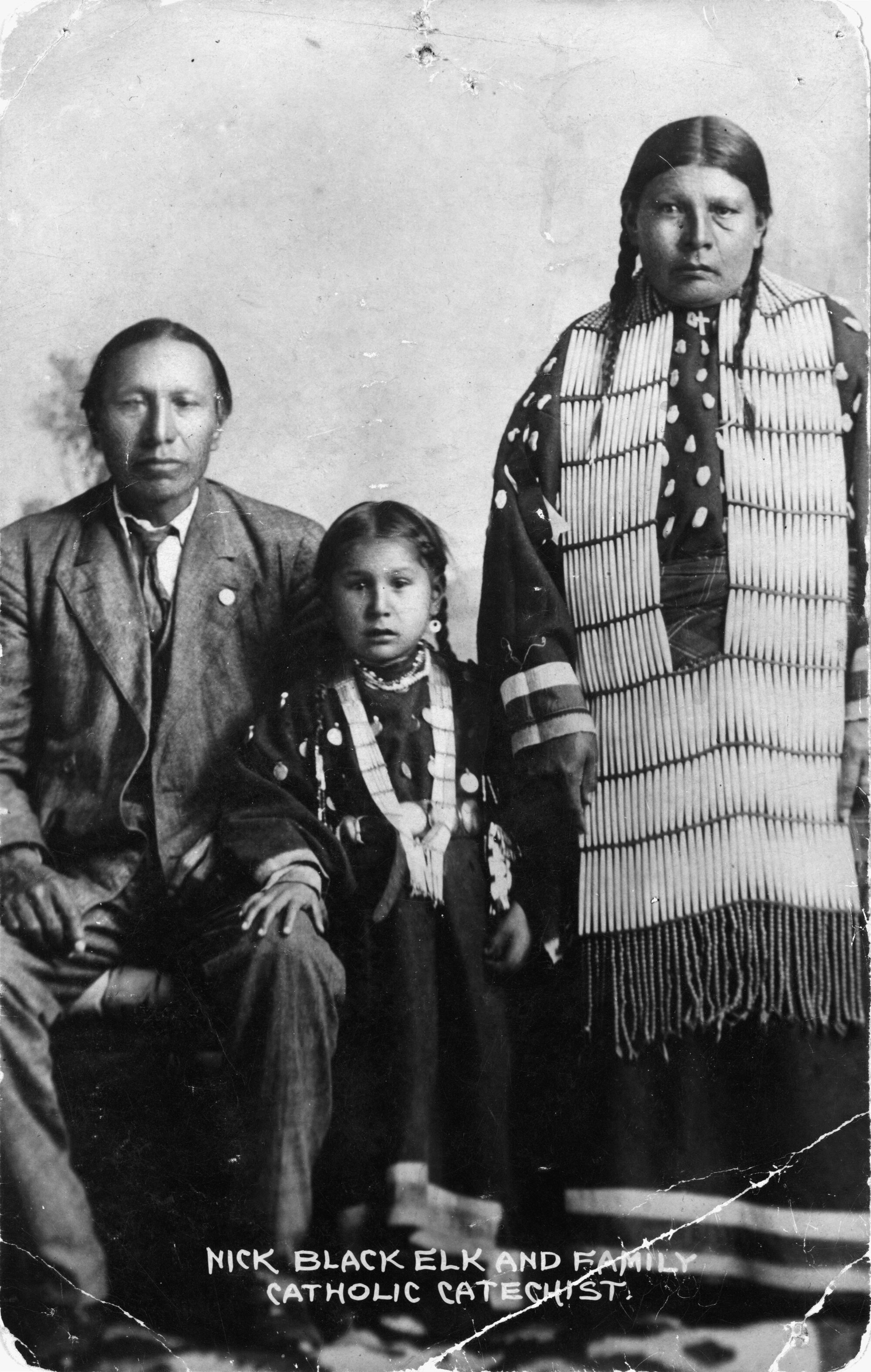
- Nicholas Black Elk, daughter Lucy Black Elk and wife Anna Brings White, photographed ca 1910
- Born: 1 December 1863; Little Powder River, Wyoming, United States
- Died: 19 August 1950 (aged 86); Pine Ridge, South Dakota, United States
- Major shrine: Saint Agnes Catholic Cemetery, Manderson, South Dakota
- Patronage: Native Americans (pending)

Heȟáka Sápa, commonly known as Black Elk (baptized Nicholas; December 1, 1863 – August 19, 1950), was a wičháša wakȟáŋ ("medicine man, holy man") and heyoka of the Oglala Lakota people. He was a second cousin of the war leader Crazy Horse and fought with him in the Battle of Little Bighorn. He survived the Wounded Knee Massacre in 1890. He toured and performed in Europe as part of Buffalo Bill's Wild West.

Black Elk is best known for his interviews with poet John Neihardt, where he discussed his religious views, visions, and events from his life. Neihardt published these in his book Black Elk Speaks in 1932. This book has since been published in numerous editions, most recently in 2008. Near the end of his life, he also spoke to American ethnologist Joseph Epes Brown for his 1947 book The Sacred Pipe. There has been great interest in these works among diverse people interested in Native American religions, notably those in the pan-Indian movement.

Black Elk converted to Catholicism, becoming a catechist, but he also continued to practice Lakota ceremonies. The Diocese of Rapid City opened an official cause for his canonization in 2016.

== Early years ==
=== Childhood and visions ===
Black Elk was born into an Oglala Lakota family in December 1863 along the Little Powder River (at a site thought to be in the present-day state of Wyoming), in a long line of healers; his father was a medicine man, as were his paternal uncles. According to the Lakota way of measuring time (referred to as Winter counts), Black Elk was born in "the Winter When the Four Crows Were Killed on Tongue River."

Black Elk fell ill when he was nine years old, lying prone and unresponsive for several days. During this time he said he had a great vision in which he was one of the Wakinyan, or spiritual grandfathers of the Lakota nation. When he was 17, he told a medicine man, Black Road, about the vision in detail; he and the village's other medicine men were "astonished by the greatness of the vision." He had more visions, including one in which a great tree symbolized the life of the Earth and all people.

In one of his visions, Black Elk describes being taken to the center of the Earth, and to the central mountain of the world. Mythologist Joseph Campbell notes that an "axis mundi, the central point, the pole around which all revolves ... the point where stillness and movement are together ..." is a theme in several other religions, as well. Campbell viewed Black Elk's statement as one key to understanding worldwide religious myth and symbols in general.

Black Elk was present at the Battle of the Little Bighorn.

== Later years: international touring and Ghost Dance movement ==
=== Buffalo Bill's Wild West ===
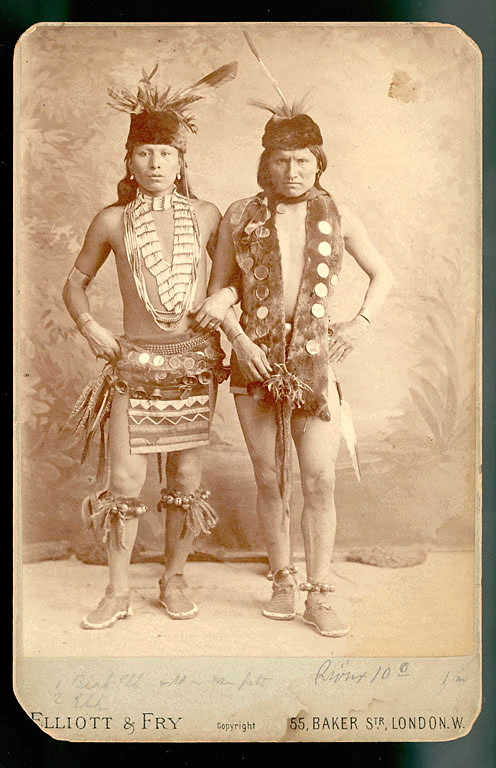
Black Elk (L) and Elk of the Oglala Lakota photographed in London in their grass dance regalia while touring with Buffalo Bill's Wild West, 1887

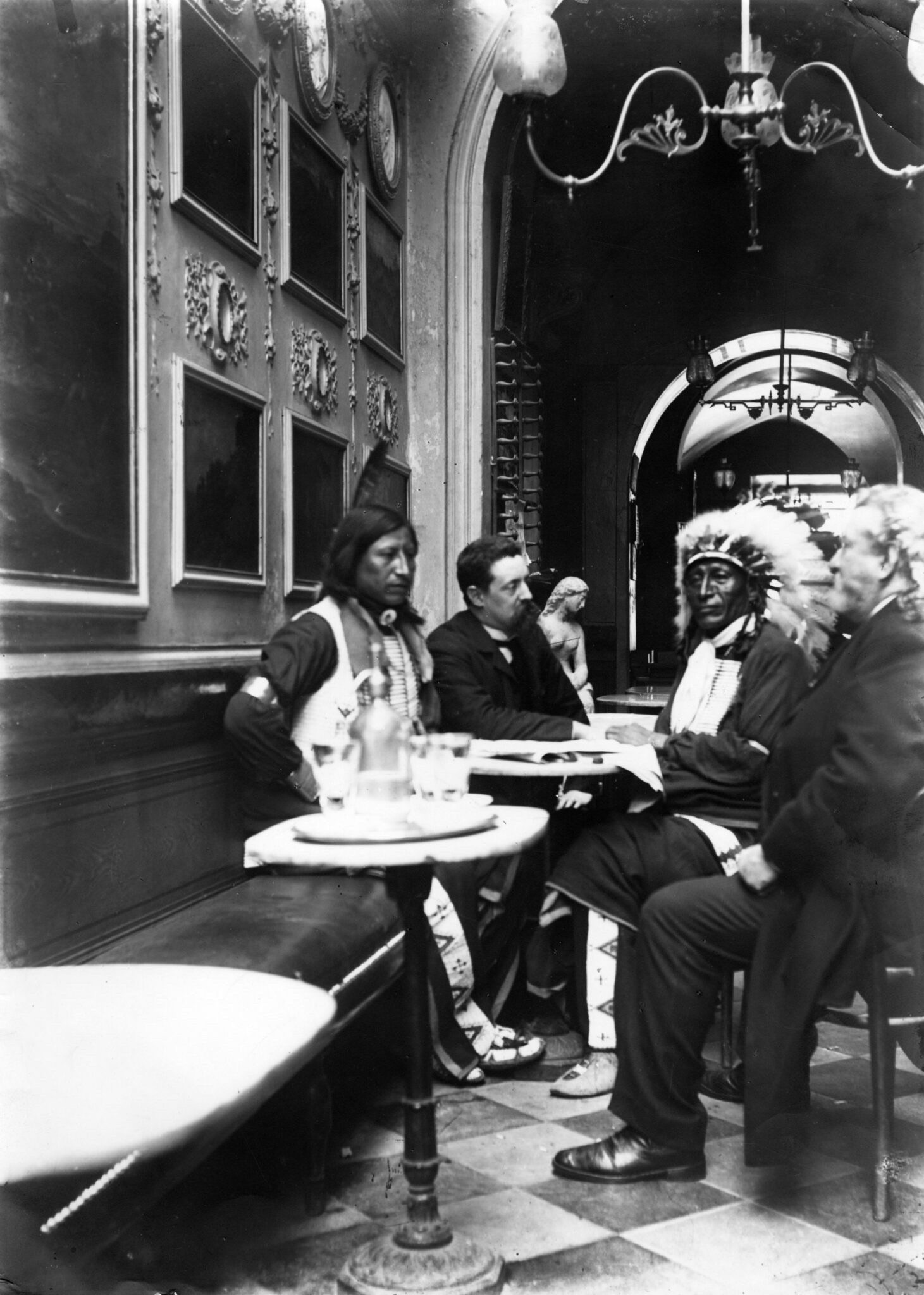
L–R: Black Elk, Italian journalist Diego Angeli, Sitting Bull, and Buffalo Bill at Rome's Antico Caffè Greco in February 1890, during a Wild West Show tour in Italy

In 1887, Black Elk traveled to England with Buffalo Bill's Wild West. On May 11, 1887, the troupe put on a command performance for Queen Victoria, whom they called "Grandmother England." He was among the crowd at her golden jubilee.

In the spring of 1888, Buffalo Bill's Wild West set sail for the United States. Black Elk became separated from the group, and the ship left without him, stranding him with three other Lakota. They joined another Wild West show and he spent the next year touring in Germany, France, and Italy. When Buffalo Bill arrived in Paris in May 1889, Black Elk obtained a ticket to return home to Pine Ridge, arriving in the autumn of 1889. During his sojourn in Europe, Black Elk was given an "abundant opportunity to study the white man's way of life," and he learned to speak rudimentary English.

=== The Ghost Dance and Wounded Knee Massacre ===
Black Elk returned to the Pine Ridge Reservation after touring with the Wild West shows. He became involved with the Ghost Dance movement, bringing to the followers of the movement a special Ghost Dance shirt, after seeing his ancestors in vision who instructed him, "We will give you something that you shall carry back to your people, and with it they shall come to see their loved ones". The Ghost Dance brought hope: The white man would soon disappear; the buffalo herds would return; people would be reunited with loved ones who had since died; the old way of living before the white man would return. This was not just a religious movement but a response to the gradual cultural destruction.

Black Elk was present at the Wounded Knee Massacre in 1890, which occurred due to fear by US settlers of the large interest in the Ghost Dance by Plains tribes. While on horseback, he said he charged soldiers and helped to rescue some of the wounded, arriving after many of Spotted Elk's (Big Foot's) band of people had been shot. He was grazed by a bullet to his hip. Lakota leader Red Cloud convinced him to stop fighting after being wounded, and he remained on the Pine Ridge Reservation, where he could convert to Catholicism.

== Final years: Conversion to Catholicism ==
For at least a decade, beginning in 1934, Black Elk returned to work related to his performances earlier in life with Buffalo Bill. He organized an Indian show to be held at the Sitting Bull Crystal Cavern Dance Pavilion in the sacred Black Hills. Neihardt writes that, unlike the Wild West shows, used to glorify Native American warfare, Black Elk created a show to teach tourists about Lakota culture and traditional sacred rituals, including the Sun Dance.

Black Elk's first wife Katie converted to Catholicism, and they had their three children baptized as Catholics. After Katie's death in 1903, in 1904 Black Elk, then in his 40s, converted to Catholicism. He was christened with the name of Nicholas and later served as a catechist in the church, teaching others about Christianity. After this, other medicine men, including his nephew Fools Crow, referred to him both as Black Elk and Nicholas Black Elk. The widower Black Elk married again in 1905 to Anna Brings White, a widow with two daughters. Together they had three more children, whom they also had baptized as Catholic. He said his children "had to live in this world." The couple were together until her death in 1941. His son, Benjamin Black Elk (1899–1973), became known as the "Fifth Face of Mount Rushmore", posing in the 1950s and 1960s for tourists at the memorial.

=== 1930s: Meeting with Neihardt and Brown ===
In the early 1930s, Black Elk spoke with John Neihardt and Joseph Epes Brown, which led to the publication of Neihardt's books. His son Ben translated Black Elk's stories into English as he spoke. Neihardt's daughter Enid recorded these accounts. She later arranged them in chronological order for Neihardt's use. Thus the process had many steps and involved more people than Black Elk and Neihardt in the recounting and recording.

After Black Elk spoke with Neihardt over the course of several days, Neihardt asked why Black Elk had "put aside" his old religion and baptized his children. According to [Neihardt's daughter] Hilda, Black Elk replied, "My children had to live in this world." "To live" according to Black Elk, is one of the central prayers of Lakota spirituality. (Black Elk mentions this prayer for life nineteen times in The Sacred Pipe.) In her 1995 memoir, Hilda Neihardt wrote that just before his death, Black Elk took his pipe and told his daughter Lucy Looks Twice, "The only thing I really believe is the pipe religion."

== Legacy ==
Since the 1970s, the book Black Elk Speaks has become popular with those interested in Native Americans in the United States. With the rise of Native American activism, there was increasing interest among many in Native American religions. Within the American Indian Movement, especially among non-Natives and urban descendants who had not been raised in a traditional culture, Black Elk Speaks was a popular book among those newly seeking religious and spiritual inspiration. However, critics have stated that John Neihardt, as the author and editor, may have exaggerated, altered, or invented some of the content either to make it more marketable to the intended white audience of the 1930s, or because he did not fully understand the Lakota culture.

On August 11, 2016, the US Board on Geographic Names officially renamed Harney Peak, the highest point in South Dakota, Black Elk Peak in honor of Nicholas Black Elk and in recognition of the significance of the mountain to Native Americans.

In August 2016, the Diocese of Rapid City opened an official cause for his beatification within the Catholic Church. On October 21, 2017, the cause for canonization for Nicholas Black Elk was formally opened by the Catholic Diocese of Rapid City, South Dakota, paving the way for the possibility of him eventually being recognized as a saint. Black Elk's conversion to Catholicism has confused many, both Indigenous and Catholic. Biographer Jon M. Sweeney addressed this duality in 2020, explaining, "Nick didn't see reason to disconnect from his vision life after converting to Catholicism.... Was Black Elk a true Lakota in the second half of his life? Yes.... Was he also a real Christian? Yes." He is now designated by Catholics as a "Servant of God", a title indicating that his life and works are being investigated by the Pope and the Catholic Church for possible beatification. His work to share the Gospel with Native and non-Native people and harmonize the faith with Lakota culture were noted at the Mass where this was announced.

Damian Costello writes that Black Elk's Lakota Catholic faith was uniquely anti-colonial, stemming from his Ghost Dance vision. In this he says it was broadly analogous to anti-colonial movements from across the globe drawn from the Biblical narrative, such as the Rastafari in Jamaica.

=== Books ===
Books of Black Elk's accounts

- Black Elk Speaks: Being the Life Story of a Holy Man of the Oglala Sioux (as told to John G. Neihardt), Bison Books, 2004 (originally published in 1932) : Black Elk Speaks.
- The Sixth Grandfather: Black Elk's Teachings Given to John G. Neihardt, edited by Raymond J. DeMallie, University of Nebraska Press; new edition, 1985. ISBN 0-8032-1664-5.
- The Sacred Pipe: Black Elk's Account of the Seven Rites of the Oglala Sioux (as told to Joseph Epes Brown), MJF Books, 1997
- Spiritual Legacy of the American Indian (as told to Joseph Epes Brown), World Wisdom, 2007

=== Film ===
In 2020, a documentary produced by the Diocese of Rapid City, Walking the Good Red Road – Nicholas Black Elk's Journey to Sainthood, aired on ABC television affiliates.

== See also ==
- Black Elk Wilderness
- Black Elk Peak
- Charles Eastman
- Crazy Horse
- I Remain Alive: the Sioux Literary Renaissance
- John Fire Lame Deer
- Red Cloud
- Sitting Bull
