= Luther Standing Bear =

Native American writer and actor (1868–1939)

- Óta Kté or Plenty Kill
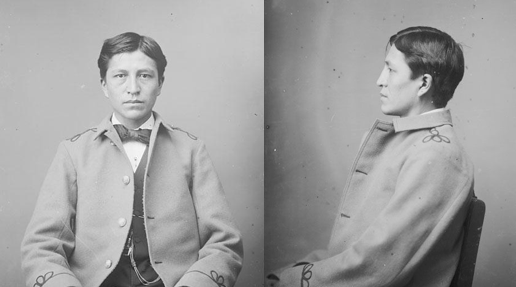
- c. 1890
- Born: December 1868; Sicanġu, Dakota Territory, U.S.
- Died: February 20, 1939 (aged 70); Huntington Beach, California, U.S.
- Other name: Matȟó Nážiŋ or Standing Bear
- Citizenship: Rosebud Sioux Tribe
- Education: Carlisle Indian Industrial School
- Occupations: Author; educator; philosopher; actor
- Parent(s): George Standing Bear (father), Pretty Face (mother)
- Relatives: Henry Standing Bear (brother)

Luther Standing Bear (Óta Kté or "Plenty Kill," also known as Matȟó Nážiŋ or "Standing Bear", 1868 – 1939) was a Sicangu and Oglala Lakota author, educator, philosopher, and actor. He worked to preserve Lakota culture and sovereignty, and was at the forefront of a Progressive movement to change government policy toward Native Americans.

Standing Bear was one of the Lakota leaders of his generation who was born and raised in the oral traditions of his culture, and then also educated in white culture, who then went on to write historical accounts in English about his people and history. Standing Bear's writings about his early life, years at the Carlisle Indian Industrial School, Wild Westing with Buffalo Bill, and life on the reservations presented a Native American viewpoint during the Progressive Era in American history.

Standing Bear's commentaries on Native American cultures educated the American public, deepened public awareness, and created popular support to change government policies toward Native American peoples. Standing Bear helped create the popular twentieth-century image that Native American culture is holistic and respectful of nature. His commentaries have become part of college-level reading lists in anthropology, literature, history, and philosophy. They constitute a legacy and treasury of Native American thought.

== Early life ==
Luther Standing Bear was born in December 1868 on the Spotted Tail Agency, Rosebud, Dakota Territory, the first son of George Standing Bear and Pretty Face. Luther's father, George Standing Bear, was a Sicangu (Brulé Lakota) chief. The boy was raised by his mother's people as a traditional hunter and warrior.

In 1873, Luther Standing Bear saw the Sioux warriors return from the large-scale attack on a big hunting group of Pawnee in Massacre Canyon, Nebraska. Later he would write about it. He was one of the few to give a Sioux eyewitness account of the attack on the hunters, and of his father's role in the battle.

In the late 1870s, George Standing Bear built a general store, the first Native American-run business on the Spotted Tail agency. In 1879, young Standing Bear began attending the Carlisle Indian Industrial School in Carlisle, Pennsylvania. Luther's father was aware of white people's great numbers and influence, and he believed that education was the path Indians must follow to survive in the "white world".

== Carlisle Industrial School for Indians ==
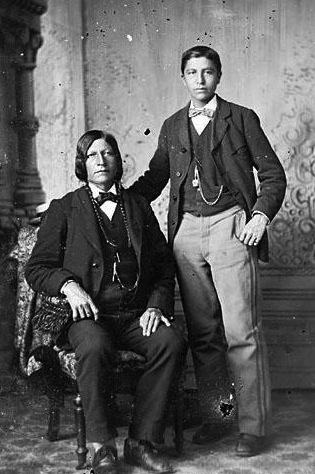
Luther Standing Bear with his father, George Standing Bear, at Carlisle Indian School, c. 1890

The Carlisle Indian Industrial School in Carlisle, Pennsylvania, was one of the earliest Native American boarding schools, whose goal was cultural assimilation of Native Americans. Standing Bear was one of the first students to arrive when Carlisle opened its doors in 1879. Once there, he was asked to choose a name from a list on the wall. He randomly pointed at the symbols on a wall and named himself Luth.

Standing Bear soon became Captain Richard Henry Pratt's model Carlisle student. Like many other Carlisle students, Standing Bear had high personal regard for Captain Pratt. Standing Bear interpreted and recruited students for Pratt at Pine Ridge, South Dakota; led the Carlisle Indian Band across the Brooklyn Bridge upon its opening ceremony on May 24, 1883; and served as a student intern for John Wanamaker in Philadelphia, Pennsylvania.

== Back on the reservation ==
In 1884, following his final term at Carlisle, Standing Bear, armed with a recommendation by Captain Pratt, returned home to the Rosebud Agency, Rosebud, Dakota Territory, where he was hired as an assistant at the reservation's school at the salary of three hundred dollars a year.

In 1890, some time after Wounded Knee, Standing Bear moved from Rosebud and followed his father and brother, Ellis Standing Bear, to Pine Ridge, South Dakota. Pine Ridge provided a series of varying employment and family ventures. In 1891, Standing Bear became principal of a reservation day school. Standing Bear also worked in his uncle's little general store.

Standing Bear wrote to John Wanamaker to inquire about establishing a post office on the reservation, but was told that Native Americans were not legally permitted to serve as postmaster. The post office was set up in the name of a white missionary but run by Standing Bear.

Later, Standing Bear and his brother Ellis opened a dry goods store at Pass Creek and started a small ranch raising horses and cattle. Standing Bear organized public meetings at his dry goods store in Pine Ridge to discuss treaties and current events.

=== Marriages and children ===
Standing Bear married Nellie DeCrory in 1886, and they had six children: Lily Standing Bear; Arthur Standing Bear; Paul Francis Standing Bear; Emily Standing Bear; Julia Standing Bear; and Alexandra Birmingham Cody Standing Bear. Around 1899, Standing Bear married Laura Cloud Shield, and the couple had one additional child, Eugene George Standing Bear.

=== Train wreck ===
In 1902 and 1903, Standing Bear signed up for tours with Buffalo Bill. The 1903 touring season was cut short on April 7, 1903, by a terrible accident in Maywood, Illinois, when the rear cars of Standing Bear's train were struck by another train. Three young Indians were killed, and 27 performers badly injured. Standing Bear was seriously injured and almost died. He suffered a dislocation of both hips, a left broken leg below the knee, a left broken arm, two broken ribs, a broken collar bone, a broken nose, and deep gashes on head. As a result, Standing Bear and his family could not return to Buffalo Bill's Wild West.

== Leaving the reservation ==
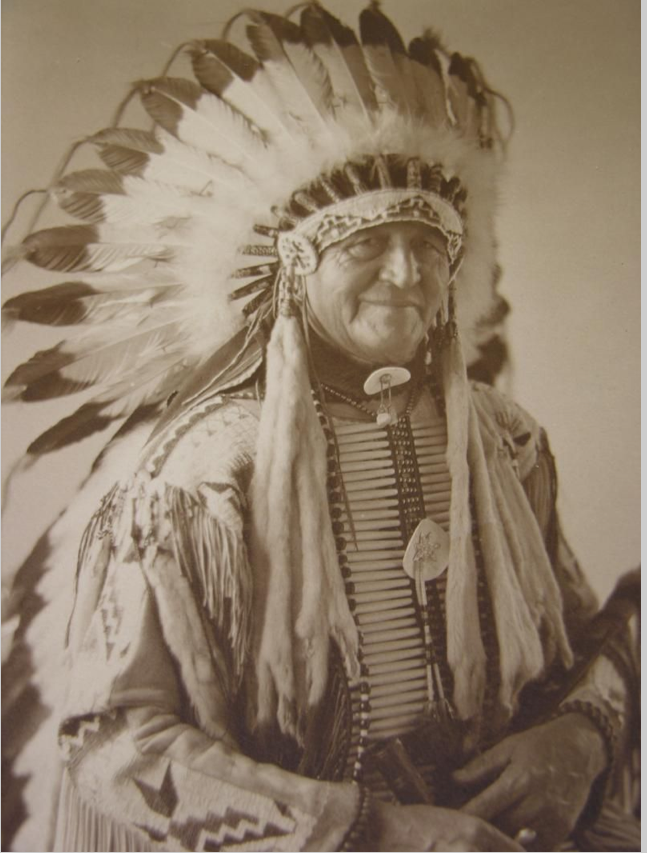
Luther Standing Bear

After returning to Pine Ridge, Standing Bear was chosen as a chief of the Oglala Lakota on July 4, 1905, but he decided to leave later that year, writing that he "was no longer willing to endure existence under the control of an overseer." Standing Bear sold his land allotment and bought a house in Sioux City, Iowa, where he worked as a clerk in a wholesale firm. After a brief job doing rodeo performances with Miller Brothers 101 Ranch in Oklahoma, he moved to California to seek full-time employment in the motion picture industry.

== Hollywood and the movies ==
In 1912, Standing Bear moved to California and was recruited as a consultant by motion picture director Thomas H. Ince because of his experience as a performer with Buffalo Bill's Wild West. Standing Bear made his screen debut in Ramona in 1916. From 1912 to the 1930s, he was employed in the motion picture industry, working alongside Tom Mix, Douglas Fairbanks and William S. Hart on early Hollywood Westerns. Luther Standing Bear appeared in a dozen or more films (sources disagree a bit), playing both Indian and non-Indian roles.

=== Selected filmography ===
- Ramona (1916)
- Bolshevism on Trial (1919)
- White Oak (1921)
- The Santa Fe Trail (1930)
- The Conquering Horde (1931)
- Texas Pioneers (1932)
- Massacre (1934) (uncredited)
- Laughing Boy (1934) (uncredited)
- Murder in the Private Car (1934) (uncredited)
- Cyclone of the Saddle (1935)
- The Miracle Rider (1935 serial)
- Fighting Pioneers (1935)
- Circle of Death (1935)
- Fighting Pioneers (1935)
- Union Pacific (1939)

=== Indian actors' guilds ===
Standing Bear was a member of the Screen Actors Guild of Hollywood. Standing Bear was critical of Hollywood's portrayals of Native Americans, and wanted only Native Americans to play Native Americans and appear on the screen in leading and meaningful roles. In 1926, along with other Indian actors in Hollywood, he created the "War Paint Club." Ten years later, Standing Bear joined Jim Thorpe in creating the Indian Actors Association to protect rights and characters of Native American actors from defamation or ridicule.

== Luther Standing Bear's commentaries ==
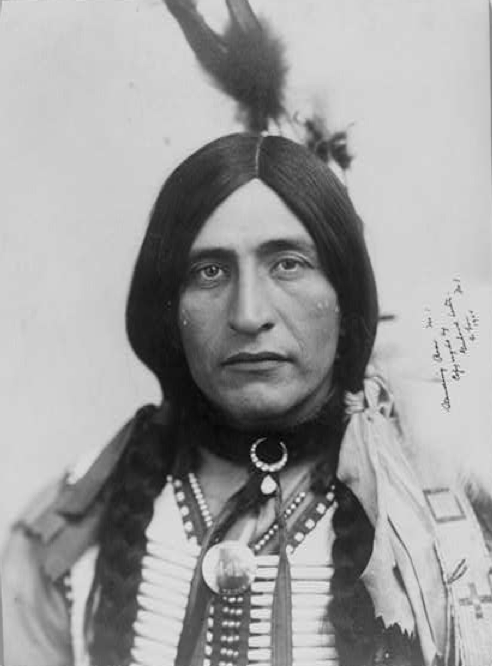
"I left reservation life and my native people, the Oglala Sioux, because I was no longer willing to endure existence under the control of an overseer. For about the same number of years I had tried to live a peaceful and happy life; tried to adapt myself and make re-adjustments to fit the white man's mode of existence. But I was unsuccessful. I developed into a chronic disturber. I was a bad Indian, and the agent and I never got along. I remained a hostile, even a savage, if you please. And I still am. I am incurable." — Luther Standing Bear

=== Protecting Native American heritage and sovereignty ===
Between 1928 and 1936, Standing Bear wrote four books and a series of articles about protecting Lakota culture and in opposition to government regulation of Native Americans. Standing Bear's commentaries challenged government policies regarding education, assimilation, freedom of religion, tribal sovereignty, return of lands and efforts to convert the Lakota into sedentary farmers.

Standing Bear opposed the Dawes Act's policy of privatization of communal holdings of Native American tribes, and was critical of government support of missionaries who undermined Sioux religion, as did the prohibition against the Sun Dance, the most important religious and social event in the yearly cycle of Sioux life.

=== Books, articles and forums ===
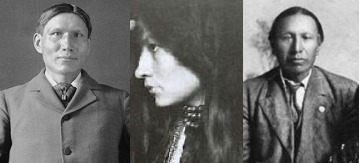
Standing Bear was one of a small group of Lakota authors of his generation, such as Charles Eastman, Zitkala-Sa, and Black Elk, who were born and raised in the oral traditions of their culture, as well as educated in white culture, who then went on to write significant historical accounts of their people and history in English. Left to right: Charles Eastman, Zitkala-Sa, and Black Elk

Between 1928 and 1934, Progressives organized and launched a national education campaign to change government policies towards Native Americans.

The campaign began in 1928 with the publication of Standing Bear's book My People the Sioux and the release of John Collier's Meriam Report. During this period, Standing Bear published four books and numerous articles to educate the public about Lakota culture, and toured the forums of the American lecture circuit building critical support for an Indian New Deal.

Standing Bear was at the forefront of the Progressive movement and his commentaries educated the American public, deepened awareness and created popular support to change government policies toward Native American peoples. At the time, Native American authors were a rarity, and Standing Bear's books were considered culturally significant and reviewed by The New York Times.

In 1931, Standing Bear published My Indian Boyhood, a classic memoir of life, experience and education of a Lakota child in the late 1800s. That year, after an absence of 20 years, he visited Pine Ridge, South Dakota. He was so distressed by the desperate plight of his people that he wrote "The Tragedy of the Sioux" in American Mercury condemning federal Indian policy for the continued destruction of the Lakota.

Land of the Spotted Eagle, published in 1933, is an ethnographic description of traditional Lakota life and customs, criticizing whites' efforts to "make over" the Indian into the likeness of the white race. In 1933, Standing Bear also published What the Indian Means to America. In 1934, he published a collection of Lakota tales and legends in Stories of the Sioux.

== Standing Bear and the Indian New Deal ==
Standing Bear was at the forefront of the Progressive movement, and he joined with advocate John Collier, the Indian Rights Association, and others to protect Native American religion and sovereignty. His commentaries on Native American culture and wisdom educated the American public, deepened public awareness, and created popular support to change in government policies toward Native American peoples.

In 1928, Standing Bear's My People the Sioux and the Meriam Report were published, launching an organized campaign to challenge government policies limiting Native American religion and sovereignty. Between 1928 and 1934, Luther Standing Bear published four books and numerous articles to educate the public about Lakota culture, and toured the forums of the American lecture circuit building critical support for an Indian New Deal.

In 1933, Collier was appointed commissioner for the Bureau of Indian Affairs in the President Franklin D. Roosevelt administration, and Standing Bear wrote to President Franklin D. Roosevelt that Congress should legislate that the history and culture of Native Americans be made part of the curriculum of public schools.

The next year, Collier introduced what became known as the Indian New Deal with Congress' passage of the Indian Reorganization Act of 1934, legislation reversing 50 years of assimilation policies by emphasizing Indian self-determination and the Dawes Act's policy of privatization of communal holdings of Native American tribes. Standing Bear's essay "The Tragedy of the Sioux" and his book Land of Spotted Eagle were published near the end of the Progressive campaign and had wide impact influencing Collier's Indian New Deal policies and fighting to restore tribal culture and sovereignty.

== Death ==
On February 20, 1939, Luther Standing Bear died in Huntington Beach, California, at the age of 70 of the flu while on the set of the film Union Pacific. He was buried in the Hollywood Forever Cemetery, Los Angeles, far from his Lakota homeland, with his sacred pipe.

== See also ==
- I Remain Alive: the Sioux Literary Renaissance
