= Henry Standing Bear =

Oglala Lakota Chief (c. 1874 – 1953)

- Matȟó Nážiŋ
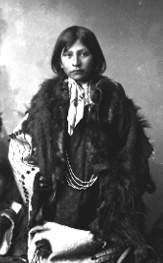
- Henry Standing Bear in 1883

Oglala Lakota leader

Personal details
- Born: Mato Naji c. 1874 United States
- Died: October 17, 1953 (aged 78–79) United States
- Relations: Luther Standing Bear (brother)

Henry Standing Bear (Lakota: Matȟó Nážiŋ; c. 1874 – 1953) was a Sicangu and Oglala Lakota chief. A founding member of the Society of American Indians, he recruited and commissioned Polish-American sculptor Korczak Ziolkowski to build the Crazy Horse Memorial in the Black Hills of South Dakota. He was a resident of Chicago's Hull House.

== Early life ==
Henry Standing Bear was born near Pierre, South Dakota. No records exist recording his birth year, but it is estimated that he was born in 1874. George Standing Bear, a Sicangu chief, was his father and Roaming Nation was his mother. Standing Bear had several siblings, including Luther Standing Bear.

Standing Bear went by several names during his youth including Spotted Horse, Sorrel Horse, and Kills Little.

== Carlisle Indian Industrial School ==
The Carlisle Indian Industrial School was a Native American boarding school created to assimilate Native Americans. On November 14, 1883, Standing Bear arrived at Carlisle. He took the name Henry after arriving. At Carlisle, Standing Bear learned how to read and write in English and developed oratory skills.

== Crazy Horse Memorial ==
In 1933, Standing Bear joined a project to create a monument to Crazy Horse. He and several Lakota leaders organized the Crazy Horse Memorial Association to promote a carved monument in the Black Hills, which the Lakota Nation consider a sacred site. During this time Gutzon Borglam was working on carving four presidents into Mount Rushmore. Earlier in 1931, Standing Bear's brother, Luther, had written to Borglum suggesting that Crazy Horse be sculpted onto Mount Rushmore.
