= Richard Clarke (frontiersman) =

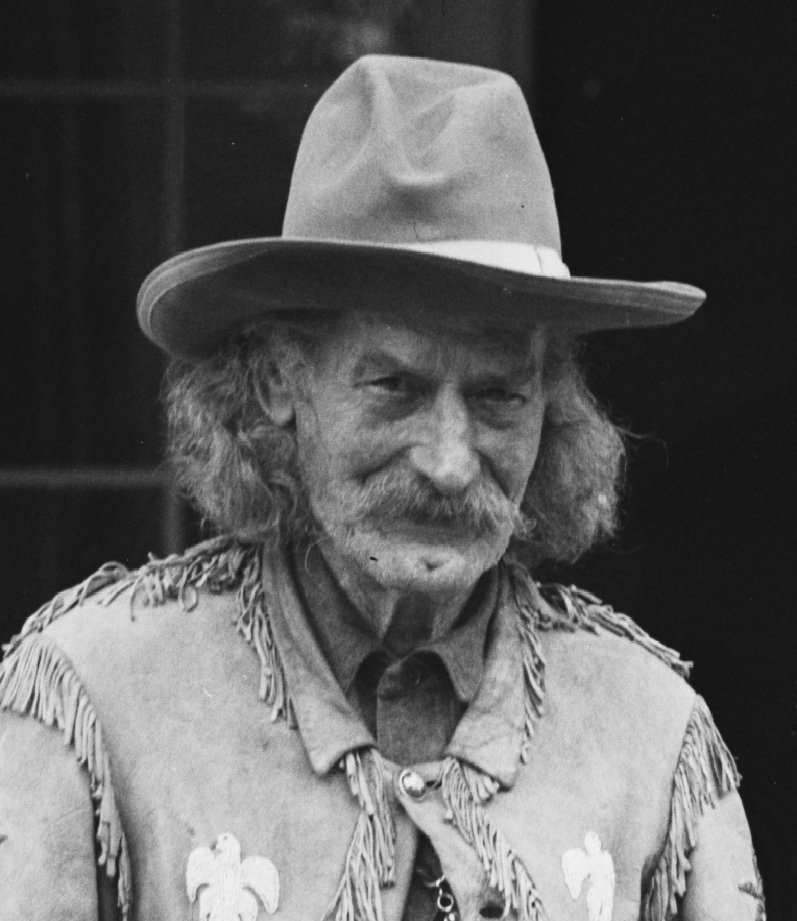
- Clarke in 1929
- Born: December 15, 1845; Hansborough, Yorkshire, UK
- Died: May 5, 1930 (aged 84); Deadwood, South Dakota, US
- Occupations: Frontiersman; actor
- Children: 2

Richard Clarke (15 December 1845 – 5 May 1930), born in Yorkshire, England, was a United States frontiersman, Pony Express rider, actor, and armed forces member who was widely considered by the American public to be the original inspiration for Deadwood Dick.

During his career, Clarke fought alongside George Armstrong Custer at the Battle of Little Bighorn against the combined forces of the Lakota, Northern Cheyenne, and Arapaho peoples. In his work with the Pony Express, Clarke often had to defend himself, others, and his cargo from Sioux raiders. Clarke lived long enough to see his country make peace with the Sioux, and met President Calvin Coolidge on the day the latter became an honorary member of the Sioux people. He died in the town in which he spent much of his life: Deadwood, South Dakota.

== Early life ==
Richard W. Clarke was born in Hansborough, Yorkshire, England, on 15 December 1845. He lived here for the first sixteen years of his life, before immigrating to the United States in 1861. Motivated by the stories of recent gold discoveries, Clarke made his way to Illinois where he fell in with a band of prospectors. At the height of excitement about gold discoveries in the Black Hills, Clarke traveled the Overland Trail into Dakota territory; completing the trip took over two months. Clarke joined the illegal settlement at Deadwood and was instrumental in building the town. The town flourished, despite the fact that the land of the Black Hills had been granted to the local Lakota people by the 1868 Treaty of Fort Laramie.

== Career ==
Clarke was widely considered to be a hero of the Old West – a man who endured the hardships of frontier life, engaged in mining, battled Native Americans, worked for the Pony Express, acted as a local guide, and was employed as an assistant to United States Marshals. He fought under the command of George Armstrong Custer at the Battle of Little Bighorn, in eastern Montana Territory on 25/26 June 1876. The 7th Cavalry Regiment, led by Custer, faced the combined forces of the Lakota, Northern Cheyenne, and Arapaho peoples, but the United States effort was a failure, and the battle resulted in the deaths of Custer and a casualty rate of 52%, with 300 military personnel either dead or wounded. Clarke managed to both escape the carnage and to establish his reputation as a respected Indian fighter. Following the battle, Clarke devoted time to refuting the rumor that Custer's death had been a suicide and supporting the notion that the military leader met his end at the hands of the Indians they were fighting.

Settling in Deadwood, Clarke claimed the acquaintance of such notable figures as Wild Bill Hickok, Calamity Jane, Buffalo Bill Cody, Poker Alice Tubbs, and Captain Jack Crawford. He adopted the moniker of "Deadwood Dick", long before Deadwood Dick became a famous fictional character.

== Deadwood Dick and the dime novel ==
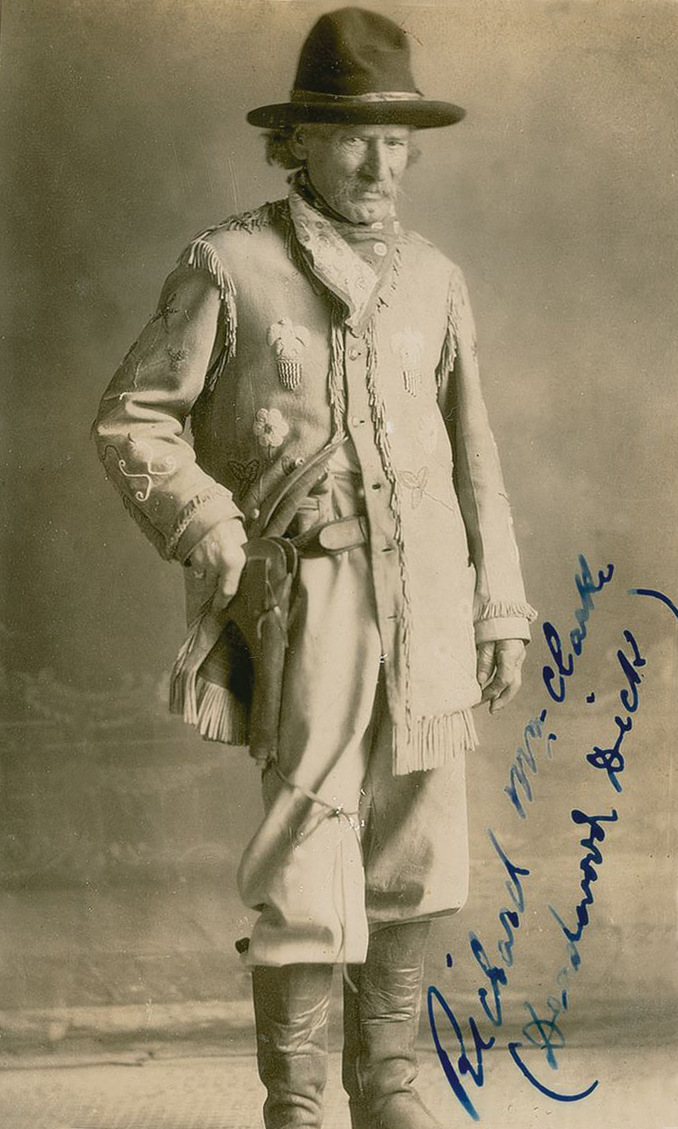
Clarke as "Deadwood Dick"

Many believe Clarke to have been the inspiration behind a number of dime novels published between 1877 and 1897, written by Edward Lytton Wheeler, and starring a protagonist named Deadwood Dick. These novels were so popular that Clarke was able to use their fame to boost his own public profile; many other Deadwood residents also adopted the name. The fictional Deadwood Dick was a fearless frontiersman, and his history shared many biographical details with Clarke. However, it was never established with any certainty that Wheeler had based his character on Clarke. Although there were eventually a number of writers on the fictional exploits of Deadwood Dick, Wheeler's first serial ran from 1877 to 1885: Deadwood Dick starred in 31 stories before the death of his creator. At this point, Beadle and Adams – publishers of the original books – introduced Deadwood Dick Jr., who was almost indistinguishable from his fictional father, and was the protagonist of a further 70 stories.

The fictional Dick was a plainsman, who spent most of his time dealing with trouble in mining camps, but highwaymen who preyed on stage coach travelers, kidnappers, and Calamity Jane helped occupy Dick's quieter hours. Deadwood Dick was invincible in combat, but did sometimes operate outside of the law.

There has been speculation the Clarke himself was the author of Wheeler's Deadwood Dick series, but this has never been sufficiently proven.

== Later career ==
Described as short, "long-haired and long-winded," Clarke provided visitors to Deadwood with a physical representation of the popular literary character. For a period, Clarke made a living in Deadwood by selling "rusty old guns with phony histories, homemade scalps, and pin ups of himself."

Clarke spent some time traveling with Buffalo Bill’s Wild West show. The show played to the American fascination with the West and frontier life, and was a circus-like attraction featuring recreations of life in the West, shooting contests, displays of horsemanship, and usually closing with a staged native attack on a settler cabin. He proved popular with audiences, and achieved some success with his own spinoff show. In his later years, he was employed by the Deadwood town administration to act as a guide for visiting tourists. Provided with a residence adjacent to the town's tourist park, Clarke dressed in buckskins and would regale visitors with stories of his past as an adventurer and warrior.

In 1927, Clarke met then President, Calvin Coolidge when the summer White House was established near Rapid City, South Dakota. At the age of 82, in 1929, Clarke made the journey from the Black Hills to Washington, D.C., for the express purpose of extending a personal invitation to President Coolidge to visit Deadwood. He opted to travel by plane, and was pleased that the flight from Rapid City to Chicago took four and a half hours as opposed to the two months it took to cross the Overland Trail. His appearance back East attracted a great deal of press interest, and the many scars that attested to Deadwood Dick’s violent past fascinated journalists. Clarke proved very interested in seeing the sites of the East, but reportedly decided the region was "effete" and publicly declared that he could never live away from the Black Hills.

== Death ==
Clarke died on 5 May 1930, at the age of 84, after an extended illness. With his passing, America was said to have lost "one of the last picturesque characters of the old west."
