= Calamity Jane =

American frontierswoman (1852–1903)

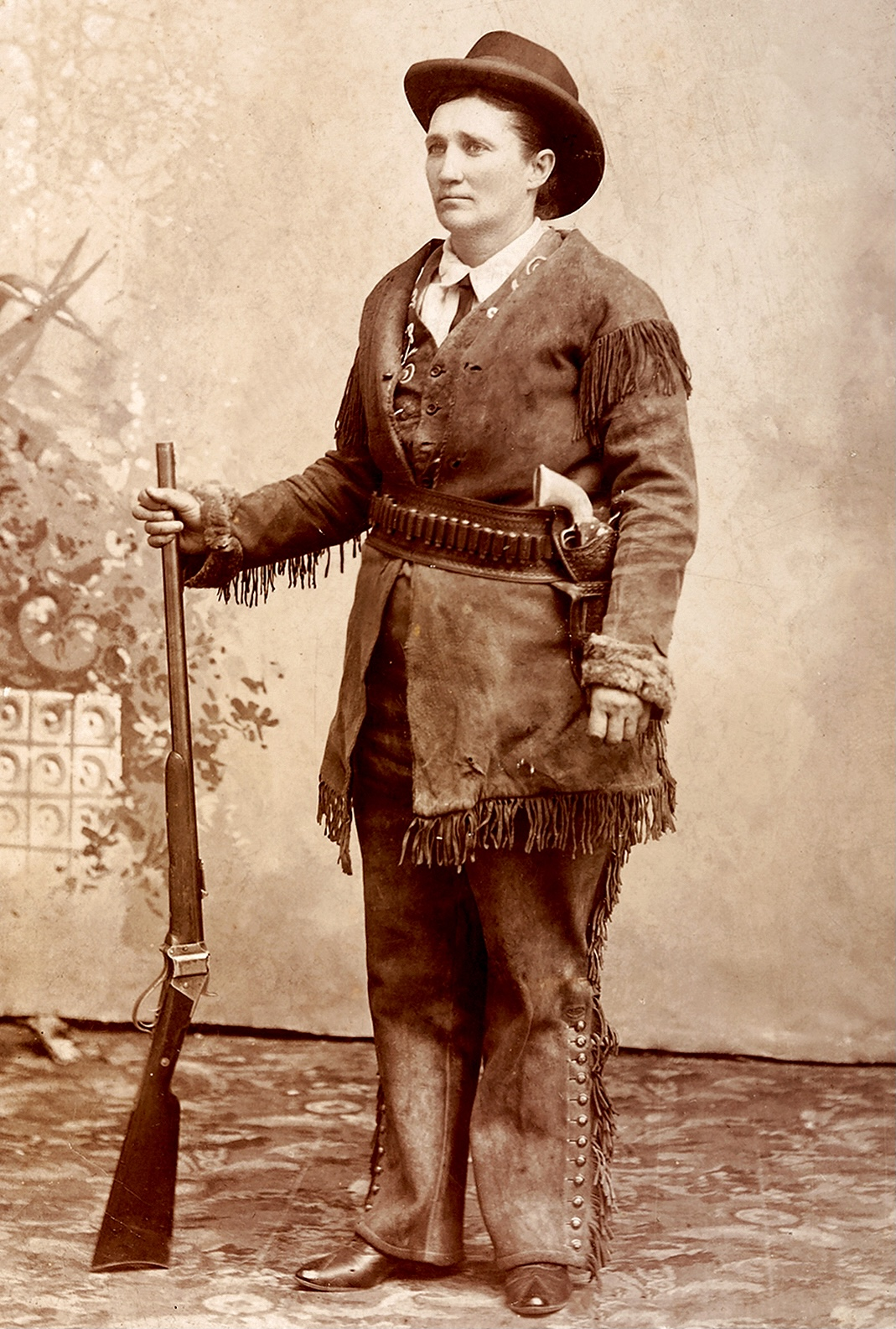
- c. 1880
- Born: Martha Jane Canary (Note: She was functionally illiterate, and the promotional pamphlet she dictated spelled her surname "Cannary" (with two N's) and repeatedly misspelled "Missourri". It also got her birth date wrong, making her about six years too old. There is ample evidence that her surname was probably spelled with only one N, including the census report of her parents when she was 4 years old.); May 1, 1852; Princeton, Missouri, U.S.
- Died: August 1, 1903 (aged 51); Terry, South Dakota, U.S.
- Occupations: Explorer; army scout; pioneer; storyteller; sharpshooter; performer; dance-hall girl; alleged prostitute
- Spouses: Clinton Burk; William P Steers
- Children: 4

Martha Jane Canary (May 1, 1852 – August 1, 1903), better known as Calamity Jane, was an American frontierswoman, sharpshooter and storyteller. In addition to many exploits, she was known for being an acquaintance of Wild Bill Hickok. Late in her life, she appeared in Buffalo Bill's Wild West show and at the 1901 Pan-American Exposition. She is said to have exhibited compassion to others, especially to the sick and needy. This facet of her character contrasted with her daredevil ways and helped to make her a celebrated frontier figure. She was also known for her habit of wearing men's attire.

== Early life ==
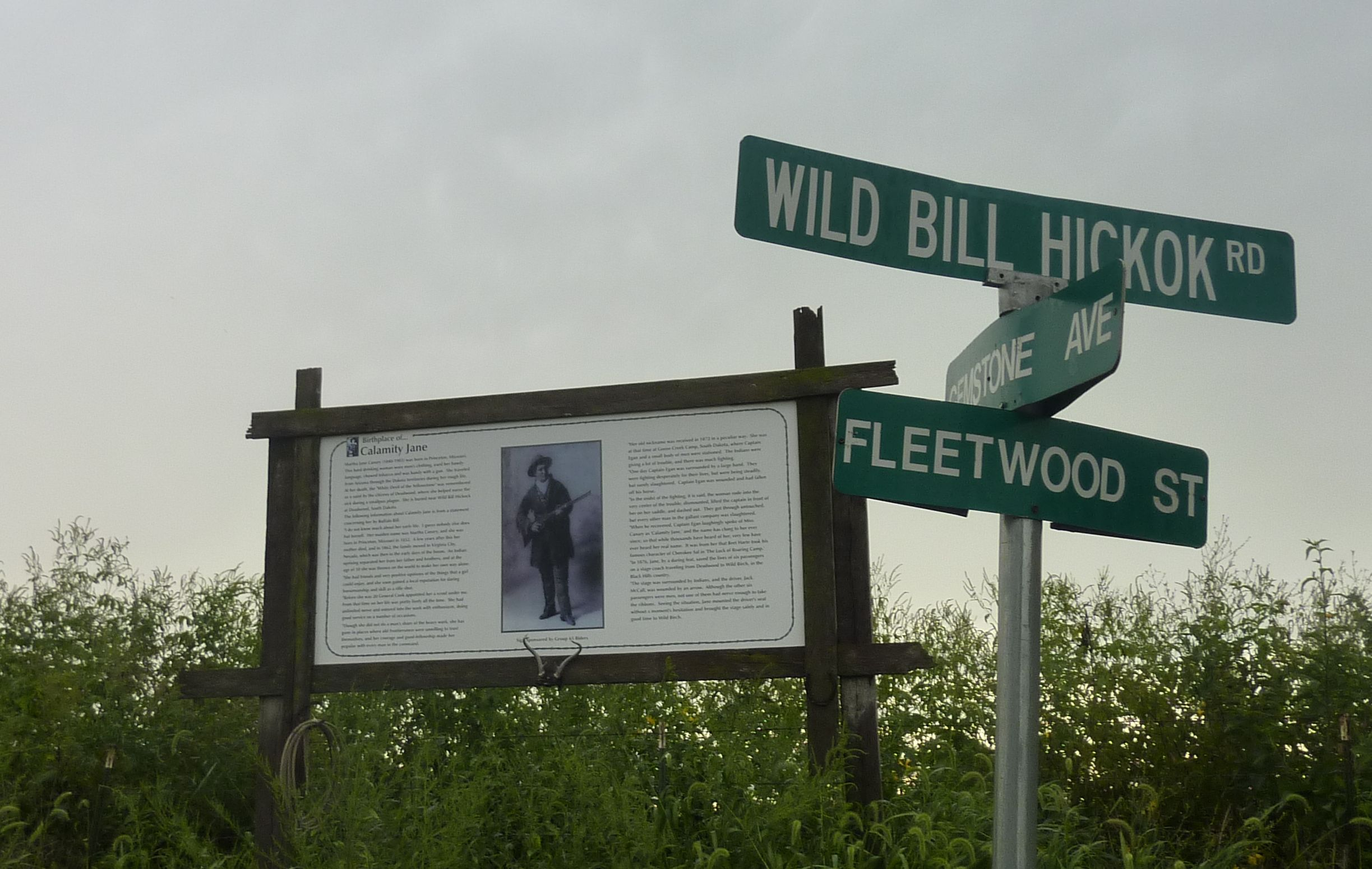
Marker east of Princeton indicating the most widely believed location of her birth. The site was later occupied by a Premium Standard Farms hog farm.

Much of the information about the early years of Calamity Jane's life comes from an autobiographical booklet that she dictated in 1896, written for publicity purposes. It was intended to help attract audiences to a tour she was about to begin, in which she appeared in dime museums around the United States. Some of the information in the pamphlet is exaggerated or even completely inaccurate.

Calamity Jane was born on May 1, 1852, as Martha Jane Canary (or Cannary) (Note: It is also questioned whether she received her middle name Jane at birth or sometime later.) in Princeton, within Mercer County, Missouri. Her parents were listed in the 1860 census as living about 7 miles (11 km) northeast of Princeton in Ravanna. Her father Robert Wilson Canary had a gambling problem, and little is known about her mother Charlotte M. Canary. Jane was the eldest of six children, with two brothers and three sisters.

In 1865, the family moved by wagon train from Missouri to Virginia City, Montana. In 1866, Charlotte died of pneumonia along the way, in Blackfoot, Montana. After arriving in Virginia City in the spring of 1866, Robert took his six children to Salt Lake City, Utah. They arrived in the summer, and Robert supposedly started farming on 40 acres (16 ha) of land. The family had been in Salt Lake City for only a year when he died in 1867. At age 14, Martha Jane took charge of her five younger siblings, loaded their wagon, and took the family to Fort Bridger, Wyoming Territory, where they arrived in May 1868. From there, they traveled on the Union Pacific Railroad to Piedmont, Wyoming.

In Piedmont, Jane took whatever jobs she could find to provide for her large family. She worked as a dishwasher, cook, waitress, dance hall girl, nurse, and ox team driver. Finally, in 1874, she claimed she found work as a scout at Fort Russell. During this time, she also reportedly began her occasional employment as a prostitute at the Fort Laramie Three-Mile Hog Ranch. She moved to a rougher, mostly outdoor and adventurous life on the Great Plains.

== Acquiring the nickname ==
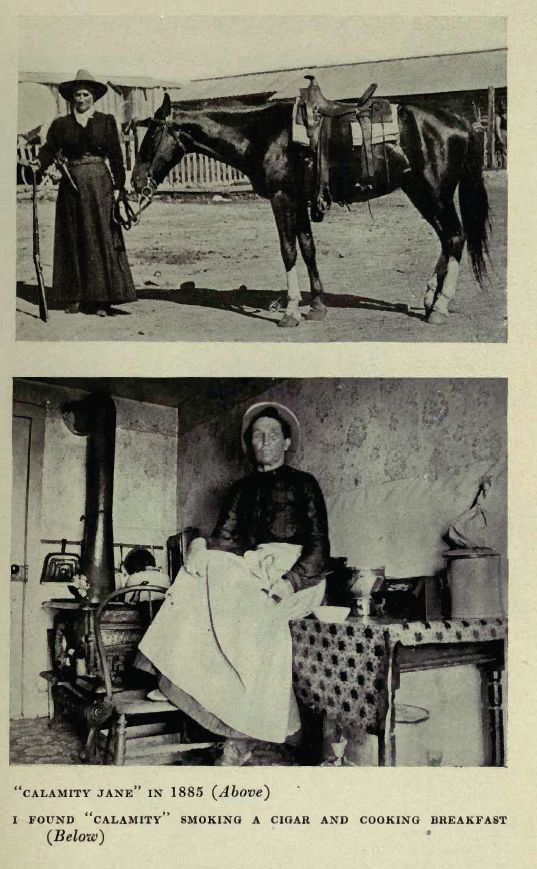
1885 photos of Calamity Jane

Jane was involved in several campaigns in the long-running military conflicts with Native Americans. Her claim was that:

It was during this campaign [in 1872–73] that I was christened Calamity Jane. It was on Goose Creek, Wyoming where the town of Sheridan is now located. Capt. Egan was in command of the Post. We were ordered out to quell an uprising of the Indians, and were out for several days, had numerous skirmishes during which six of the soldiers were killed and several severely wounded. When on returning to the Post we were ambushed about a mile and a half from our destination. When fired upon, Capt. Egan was shot. I was riding in advance and on hearing the firing turned in my saddle and saw the Captain reeling in his saddle as though about to fall. I turned my horse and galloped back with all haste to his side and got there in time to catch him as he was falling. I lifted him onto my horse in front of me and succeeded in getting him safely to the Fort. Capt. Egan, on recovering, laughingly said: "I name you Calamity Jane, the heroine of the plains." I have borne that name up to the present time.

"Captain Jack" Crawford served under Generals Wesley Merritt and George Crook. According to the Montana Anaconda Standard of April 19, 1904, he stated that Calamity Jane "never saw service in any capacity under either General Crook or General Miles. She never saw a lynching and never was in an Indian fight. She was simply a notorious character, dissolute and devilish, but possessed a generous streak which made her popular."

A popular belief is that she instead acquired the nickname as a result of her warnings to men that to offend her was to "court calamity". It is possible that "Jane" was not part of her name until the nickname was coined for her. It is certain, however, that she was known by that nickname by 1876, because the arrival of the Hickok wagon train was reported in Deadwood's newspaper, the Black Hills Pioneer, on July 15, 1876, with the headline: "Calamity Jane has arrived!"

Another account in her autobiographical pamphlet is that her detachment was ordered to the Big Horn River under General Crook in 1875. She swam the Platte River and travelled 90 miles (140 km) at top speed while wet and cold in order to deliver important dispatches. She became ill afterwards and spent a few weeks recuperating. She then rode to Fort Laramie in Wyoming and joined a wagon train headed north in July 1876. The second part of her story is verified. She was at Fort Laramie in July 1876, and she did join a wagon train that included Wild Bill Hickok. That was where she first met Hickok, contrary to her later claims, and that was how she happened to come to Deadwood.

== Deadwood and Wild Bill Hickok ==
Calamity Jane accompanied the Newton–Jenney Party into Rapid City in 1875, along with California Joe and Valentine McGillycuddy. In 1876, Calamity Jane settled in the area of Deadwood, South Dakota, in the Black Hills. There she became friends with Dora DuFran, the Black Hills' leading madam, and was occasionally employed by her.

=== McCormick claim ===
On September 6, 1941, the U.S. Department of Public Welfare granted old age assistance to a Jean Hickok Burkhardt McCormick who claimed to be the legal offspring of Martha Jane Canary and James Butler Hickok. She presented evidence that Calamity Jane and Wild Bill had married at Benson's Landing, Montana Territory (now Livingston, Montana) on September 25, 1873. The documentation was written in a Bible and presumably signed by two ministers and numerous witnesses. However, McCormick's claim has been vigorously challenged because of a variety of discrepancies.

McCormick later published a book with letters purported to be from Calamity Jane to her daughter. In them, Calamity Jane says she had been married to Hickok and that Hickok was the father of McCormick, who was born September 25, 1873, and was placed for adoption with a Captain Jim O'Neil and his wife. During this period, Calamity Jane was allegedly working as a scout for the army, and at the time of Hickok's death, he had recently married Agnes Thatcher Lake.

Calamity Jane does seem to have had two or four daughters, although the father's identity is unknown. In the late 1880s, Jane returned to Deadwood with a child whom she said was her daughter. At Jane's request, a benefit was held in one of the theaters to raise money for her daughter's education in St. Martin's Academy at Sturgis, South Dakota, a nearby Catholic boarding school. The benefit raised a large sum; Jane got drunk and spent a considerable portion of the money that same night and left with the child the next day.

Estelline Bennett was living in Deadwood at that time and had spoken briefly with Jane a few days before the benefit. She thought that Jane honestly wanted her daughter to have an education and that the drunken binge was just an example of her inability to curb her impulses and carry through long-range plans (which Bennett saw as typical of Jane's class). Bennett later heard that Jane's daughter did "get an education, and grew up and married well".

=== After the death of Wild Bill Hickok ===
Jane also claimed that, following Hickok's death, she went after his murderer Jack McCall with a meat cleaver because she had left her guns at her residence. Following McCall's execution for the crime, Jane continued living in the Deadwood area for some time, and at one point, she helped save numerous passengers in an overland stagecoach by diverting several Plains Indians who were in pursuit of the vehicle. Stagecoach driver John Slaughter was killed during the pursuit, and Jane took over the reins and drove the stage on to its destination at Deadwood.

In late 1876 or 1878, Jane nursed the victims of a smallpox epidemic in the Deadwood area.

== Final years ==
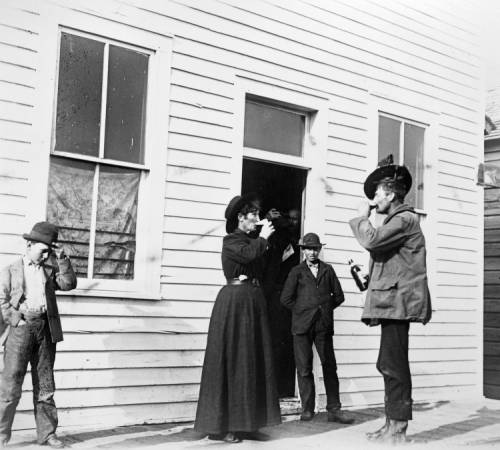
Calamity Jane shares a drink with Teddy Blue Abbott, c. 1887.

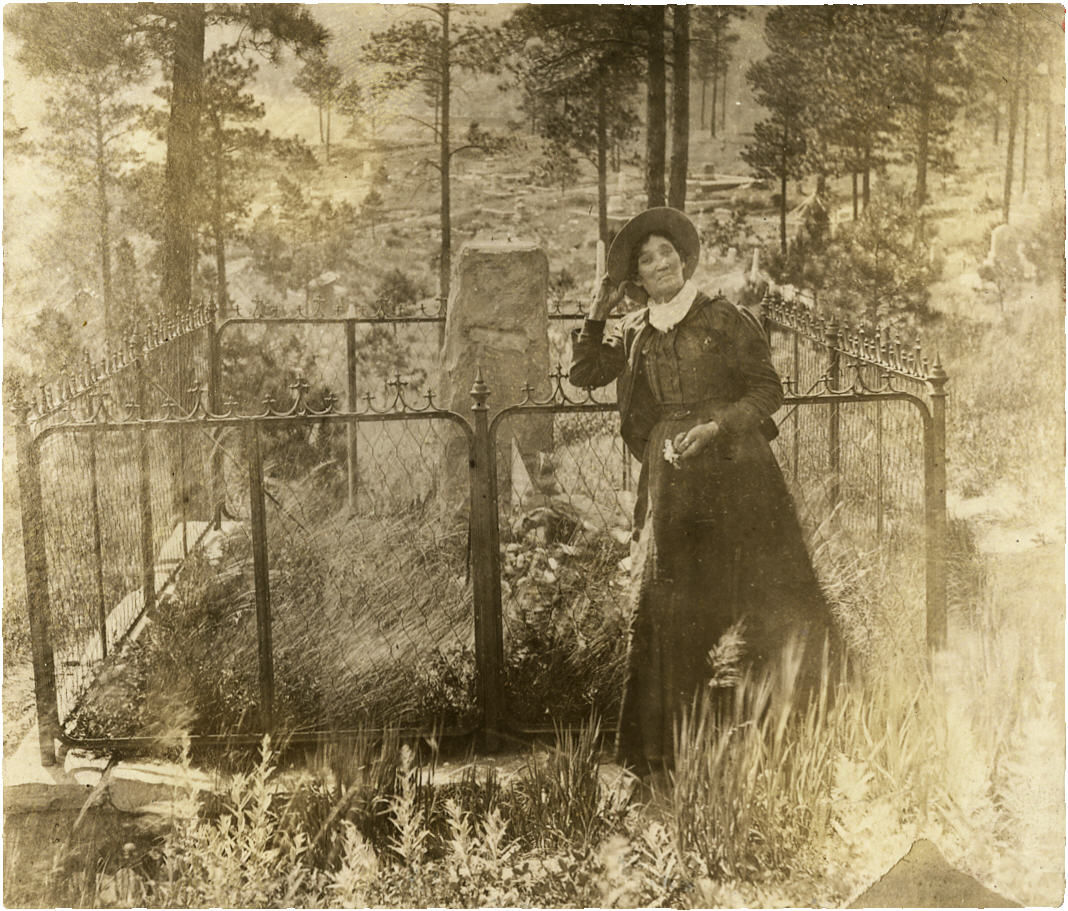
Calamity Jane at Wild Bill Hickok's Gravesite, Deadwood, Dakota Territory, 1890s

In 1881, Jane bought a ranch west of Miles City, Montana, along the Yellowstone River, where she kept an inn. In June 1887, a reporter for the Cheyenne Daily Leader interviewed Jane in Cheyenne, where she described her most exciting experiences as having occurred at Bismarck and Rawlins; at Bismarck, she recounted, a duel between an officer who had courted her and another man ended in one man's death and nearly resulted in a lynching of both Jane and her companion. The reporter noted that Jane had recently married a Mr. Steers and was en route to Rawlins. She married Clinton Burk at El Paso in 1884, with whom she had a daughter born in 1883; Burk died in 1895, and his ambition had been to give their daughter a good education.

In 1893, Calamity Jane started to appear in Buffalo Bill's Wild West show as a storyteller. She also participated in the 1901 Pan-American Exposition.

A 1901 profile described Jane as bearing the scars of a dozen bullets and noted that she had been honorably discharged from service in 1878 after helping build Fort Mead, South Dakota; by that time she had gained a livelihood selling a book of her adventures. Her addiction to liquor was evident even in her younger years. For example, on June 10, 1876, she rented a horse and buggy in Cheyenne for a one-mile joy ride to Fort Russell and back, but she was so drunk that she passed right by her destination without noticing it and finally ended up about 90 miles (140 km) away at Fort Laramie.

== Death ==
Jane returned to the Black Hills in the spring (April/May) of 1903, where brothel owner Madame Dora DuFran was still running her business. For the next few months, Jane earned her keep by cooking and doing the laundry for Dora's girls in Belle Fourche. In late July, Jane traveled by ore train to Terry, South Dakota, a small mining village near Deadwood. It was reported that she had been drinking heavily while on board the train and had fallen ill. The conductor, S. G. Tillett, carried her off the train, a bartender secured a room for her at the Calloway Hotel, and a physician was summoned. Jane's condition deteriorated quickly, and she died at the hotel on Saturday, August 1, 1903, from inflammation of the bowels and pneumonia.

A bundle of unsent letters to her daughter was allegedly found among Jane's few belongings. Composer Libby Larsen set some of these letters to music in an art song cycle called Songs from Letters (1989). The letters were made public by Jean McCormick as part of her claim to be the daughter of Jane and Hickok, but their authenticity is not accepted by some, largely because there is ample evidence that Jane was functionally illiterate.

Calamity Jane was buried at Mount Moriah Cemetery, South Dakota, next to Bill Hickok. Four of the men who planned her funeral later stated that Hickok had "absolutely no use" for Jane while he was alive, so they decided to play a posthumous joke on him by burying her by his side. Another account states: "in compliance with Jane's dying requests, the Society of Black Hills Pioneers took charge of her funeral and burial in Mount Moriah Cemetery beside Wild Bill. Not just old friends, but the morbidly curious and many who would not have acknowledged Calamity Jane when she was alive, overflowed the First Methodist Church for the funeral services on August 4 and followed the hearse up the steep winding road to Deadwood's boot hill".

== In popular culture ==
The Life and Adventures of Calamity Jane
Full audiobook (13 minutes). Text

=== Documentaries ===
Calamity Jane: Wild West Legend directed by Gregory Monro in 2014

=== Games ===
She appears as a side character in the computer RPG Worlds of Ultima: Martian Dreams (1991). In the KingsIsle Entertainment game Pirate101, Calamity Jane is one of the Magnificent 7. A character named after Calamity Jane appeared as a side character in the videogame Wild Arms (1996).

In the RPG Fallout 3, the Lone Wanderer references Calamity Jane in a dialogue option when first talking to Megaton sheriff and mayor, Lucas Simms. A character named Calamity Janet appears in the card board game BANG! Calamity: The Natural World, a line of educational games made in the 1990s for the PlayStation by Lightspan Adventures, stars Calamity Jane. In the first-person shooter Hunt: Showdown, she died during a Wild West show from a mysterious accident. Also, there is a legendary rifle named after her.

She appears in the mobile game Fate/Grand Order as a limited Archer class servant during the Saber Wars 2 event.

=== Plays ===
Calamity Jane (A Musical Western), an adaptation of the 1953 Doris Day film with additional songs, premiered in May 1961.

Productions: Calamity Jane: The Play by Catherine Ann Jones: Empire State Theatre, Albany, New York; Promenade Theatre, New York, NY, with Estelle Parsons; Santa Paula Theatre, Santa Paula, CA; Wimberley Players, Wimberley, Texas; Plaza Playhouse, Carpenteria, CA. Calamity Jane the Musical by Catherine Ann Jones: South Jersey Regional Theatre, Somers Point, New Jersey; Ojai Arts Theatre, Ojai, CA; Camino Real Theatre, San Juan Capistrano, CA; One Eyed Man Productions, a touring production (2017–18), Various Cities, Australia, with Virginia Gay.

A UK tour, starring Carrie Hope Fletcher as Calamity Jane, ran January - September 2025.

=== Literature ===
==== Books ====
Calamity Jane was an important fictional character in the Deadwood Dick series of dime novels, beginning with the first appearance of Deadwood Dick in Beadle's Half-Dime Library issue #1 in 1877. This series, written by Edward Wheeler, established her with a reputation as a Wild West heroine and probably did more to enhance her familiarity to the public than any of her real life exploits.

Calamity Jane was the title character in a serial published in New York's Street & Smith's Weekly (1882) under the title, Calamity Jane: Queen of the Plains, by the author "Reckless Ralph".

The science fiction writer A. Bertram Chandler included a character named Calamity Jane Arlen in his far future novels set on the frontier Rim Worlds, a space analogue of the Old West.

A fictitious fight between Calamity Jane and an impostor is depicted in Thomas Berger's novel Little Big Man (1964).

Jane is the central character in Larry McMurtry's book Buffalo Girls: A Novel (1990).

Jane is a central character in Pete Dexter's novel Deadwood (1986).

J. T. Edson features Calamity Jane as a character in a number of his books.

In Calamity's Wake (2013), a novel of historical fiction written by Natalee Caple, Martha, or Calamity Jane, is one of two main narrators; the other is Jane's daughter Miette.

Calamity Jane, légende de l'Ouest, written by Gregory Monro (2010), is the only French biography to this day.

Calamity Jane appears in Michael Crichton's novel Dragon Teeth (2017).

==== Comics ====
Calamity Jane figures as a main character in an album of the same name of the Franco-Belgian comics series Lucky Luke, created by Morris and René Goscinny. She also features in the album Ghosthunt, created by Morris and Lo Hartog van Banda.

=== Music ===
Calamity Jane and Wild Bill Hickok are featured in the song "Deadwood Mountain" by the country duo Big & Rich. Some of her purported letters were set to music in an art-song cycle by 20th-century composer Libby Larsen, titled "Songs from Letters". Soprano Dora Ohrenstein commissioned five pieces compiled under the title Urban Diva, the second piece, Ben Johnston's Calamity Jane to Her Daughter is a theatrical setting of selected letters. "Calamity Jane" is a song by Grant-Lee Phillips on "Virginia Creeper" (2004). "Calamity Jane" is a song by Kiya Heartwood on Wishing Chair's Underdog CD (2005).

Alain Bashung, Chloé Mons, Rodolphe Burger released the album La Ballade de Calamity Jane (2006) based on Jane's letters to her daughter. "Kalamity Jane" is a song by Czech rock band Kabát. "Calamity Jane" is a song by Chris Anderson on his album "The Crown" (2004). The 1953 movie Calamity Jane with Doris Day and Howard Keel features the song "My Secret Love", which won the 1954 Academy Award for "Best Music Original Song". Calamity Jane is mentioned in the 2016 song "The Lighter" by the French pop-rock band Superbus from the album "Sixtape". Calamity Jane is mentioned in the song "Two Characters in Search of a Country Song" by The Magnetic Fields.

In 1989, an all-female American grunge/punk band named Calamity Jane (band) formed in Portland, Oregon. The only album they released before breaking up in 1992 is called Martha Jane Cannary.

Calamity Jane is featured in the song "pillow talk" by Wet Leg on the album "moisturizer" (2025).

In 2026, American songwriter Shayfer James released the song "Calamity Jane", portraying her as a vigilante who punishes men for mistreating women.

On September 16, 2026 singer/songwriter Scout Santos from Richmond, Virginia USA played her song "Calamity Jane" as part of a 3 song set at Anyfolk RVA, also released on Bandcamp.

=== Radio ===
Frontier Gentleman is a short-lived radio Western series originally broadcast on the CBS radio network. In the episode "Aces & Eights" broadcast October 12, 1958, the main character encounters Calamity Jane while seeking information for a story on Wild Bill Hickok, and subsequently witnesses Hickok's murder.

=== Television ===
The long-running series Biography featured Calamity Jane. The episode is available on the Biography website.

The name "Calamity" is given to the children's character played by Nancy Gilbert in the 1955–1956 television series Buffalo Bill, Jr., with Dick Jones as the fictitious Buffalo Bill, Jr. and Harry Cheshire as Judge Ben "Fair and Square" Wiley.

In the episode "Calamity" (December 13, 1959) of the series Colt .45, Dody Heath is cast as Calamity Jane and Joan Taylor as Dr. Ellen McGraw. In the story, series character Christopher Colt, played by Wayde Preston, hires Calamity Jane to drive the stagecoach containing Dr. McGraw and the vaccine needed for the smallpox outbreak in Deadwood. Colt is unsure if Calamity can handle the job because miners and Indians seek to steal the valuable medication.

In an episode of Have Gun – Will Travel, "The Cure" (1961), she is portrayed by Norma Crane. Among the liberties taken with the truth was changing her surname to Conroy.

In an episode of Bonanza, "Calamity Over the Comstock" (1963), Stefanie Powers plays Calamity Jane, who visits Virginia City along with Doc Holliday. In this primarily comedic episode, she is rescued by Little Joe, who at first thinks she is a male. She becomes infatuated with him, and he receives threats from Doc, who covets Jane for himself. At her urging (and threat), Doc demurs from facing down Joe, and Jane and Doc exit town. No official or unofficial documentation exists suggesting that Doc Holliday and Jane ever met during their lifetimes. It is highly unlikely that they met considering the geographical distances between them during their lives.

In an episode of the television show Death Valley Days, "A Calamity Named Jane", Fay Spain plays Calamity Jane as she joins Wild Bill Hickok's (Rhodes Reasons) show. Her uncouth behavior causes Bill to think he made a mistake, and when Bill tells her she should "act like a lady", he soon realizes he made a bigger mistake.

In the 1966 Batman series, one of the villains in season three was named "Calamity Jan" (played by Dina Merrill).

The television movie Calamity Jane (1984) featured her life story, including her alleged marriage to Wild Bill Hickok and the daughter she purportedly gave for adoption. Actress Jane Alexander portrayed Calamity and was nominated for an Emmy in 1985 for Outstanding Lead Actress in a Limited Series or Special. The show featured an early performance of Sara Gilbert as Calamity's daughter Jean at age 7.

Jane is the central character in Larry McMurtry's book Buffalo Girls: A Novel (1990), and in the 1995 TV adaptation of the same name, Jane is played by Anjelica Huston, with Sam Elliott as Wild Bill Hickok.

In 1997, the cartoon series The Legend of Calamity Jane depicted a young Jane (voiced by Barbara Weber Scaff).

Robin Weigert played Calamity Jane in the series Deadwood (2004–2006) and in the HBO sequel Deadwood: The Movie (2019).

In a season two episode of Bosch: Legacy (2022–2023) a boat pivotal to a case bears the name "Calamity Jane".

=== Films ===
The Plainsman is a 1936 film starring Gary Cooper as Bill Hickok and Jean Arthur as Jane. In Young Bill Hickok with Roy Rogers (1940), she was played by Sally Payne. She was played by Marin Sais in the 1940 serial Deadwood Dick, by Frances Farmer in the 1941 Western Badlands of Dakota, and by Jane Russell in the 1948 Bob Hope comedy The Paleface. In 1949's Calamity Jane and Sam Bass, Jane was played by Yvonne De Carlo and Sam Bass by Howard Duff; both characters were heavily fictionalized.

Calamity Jane is a 1953 musical-Western film from Warner Bros. starring Doris Day and Howard Keel as Wild Bill Hickok. The plot of the film is almost entirely fictional and bears little resemblance to the actual lives of the protagonists. It won the Best Song Oscar for "Secret Love", by Sammy Fain and Paul Francis Webster.

In the 1984 TV film Calamity Jane, she was played by Jane Alexander.

In the 1995 Disney movie Tall Tale: The Unbelievable Adventures of Pecos Bill, she was portrayed by Catherine O'Hara as a mythic figure, acquainted with Paul Bunyan and John Henry, and as Pecos Bill's jilted sweetheart and as a sheriff or deputy of some sort.

In the 1995 film Wild Bill, Calamity Jane was portrayed by Ellen Barkin.

In 1995 in Buffalo Girls, she was played by Anjelica Huston. In the 2009 French movie Lucky Luke, Jane was portrayed by Sylvie Testud.

Calamity Jane: Wild West Legend, a docu-fiction directed by Gregory Monro and released in 2014, inspired French writer and editor Rémi Chayé to create the feature-length animated movie, Calamity, a Childhood of Martha Jane Cannary. The film was released in France in 2020 and won the Annecy International Animated Film Festival's Cristal Award for Best Feature in June 2020. Its American premiere took place on the opening night of the 2021 virtual Animation First Festival presented by French Institute Alliance Française.

In the movie Our Brand Is Crisis (2015), the leading character is named "Calamity" Jane Bodine.

Robin Weigert played Jane for three seasons in the series Deadwood and in the HBO movie Deadwood: The Movie, released in May 2019.

A 2020 French-Danish animated family feature film titled Calamity, a Childhood of Martha Jane Cannary depicts young Jane's migration across the Oregon Trail.

Jane in the 2024 film Calamity Jane was played by Emily Bett Rickards.

== See also ==
- List of female explorers and travelers
- Mo'Kalamity, French-Cape Verdean roots reggae musician who takes her stage name from Calamity Jane
