= Newton–Jenney Party =

The Newton–Jenney Party of 1875, led by Henry Newton and Walter P. Jenney, and escorted by a military detachment led by Lieutenant Colonel Richard I. Dodge, and known also as the Jenney-Newton Party, was a scientific expedition sponsored by the United States Geological Survey to map the Black Hills of South Dakota. The Newton-Jenney expedition was established in response to the Black Hills Gold Rush, which had been escalated the previous year by General George Armstrong Custer's expedition into the Black Hills. The Newton–Jenney Party included many figures who would gain notoriety in the 19th century, including Calamity Jane, Dr. Valentine McGillycuddy, and California Joe Milner. The expedition confirmed Custer's claims of gold and prompted an increase of miners in the Black Hills region, which in turn antagonized events leading to the Great Sioux War of 1876-77.
