= Fort Bernard =

American frontier outpost

Fort Bernard was a small trading post in Wyoming, along the North Platte River on the Oregon Trail. It was established in 1845 on the site of an older fort established in the late 1830s. It was located about 8 miles southeast of Fort Laramie, and had been operated by the American Fur Company.

Bernard Pratte and his partner had previously owned Fort Platte on the west side of Fort Laramie but abandoned it in 1845 and enlisted Joseph Bissonette to move the operation to the east to attract travelers on the Oregon Trail before they arrived at Fort Laramie. The new fort was either named for Pratte or his father, General Bernard Pratte who had been a fur trader in his own time.

In December 1845 the fort was sold to the American Fur Company and was put under the control of Bissonette and trader John Richards. The fort did excellent business in 1866, enough to cause concern with the owners of nearby Fort Laramie. Unfortunately, the fort burned down sometime during the summer of 1866 while Richards was acquiring new supplies in New Mexico and was never rebuilt.

A trappers' trail connected from Bent's Fort on the south. Traders on the Santa Fe Trail freighted flour here to trade to emigrants during the 1866 season.
