= Fort Platte =

Coordinates: 42.209283°N 104.537696°W

Fort Platte was a stronghold and trading post in the upper Platte River Valley in the eastern part of the U.S. state of Wyoming established by Lancaster Lupton that was active between 1840 and 1846. The fort competed with Fort Laramie which was only one mile away and quickly surpassed it due to a superior supply system. In 1842, due to economic losses, Lupton had to sell the fort and it was bought by the successful fur trading firm Pratte and Cabanné who managed it from 1843 to 1845. In 1845, Pratte and Cabanné moved operations to Fort Bernard to try to capture traffic traveling west on the Oregon Trail before it reached Fort Laramie.

The fort was described by Rufus B. Sage in his 1846 book Rocky Mountain Life:

Fort Platte, being next to Fort Hall, the most important point on the route to Oregon, calls for a brief description. This post occupies the left bank of the North Fork of Platte river, three-fourths of a mile above the mouth of Laramie, in lat. 42° 20′ 13″ west from Greenwich and stands upon the direct waggon road to Oregon via South Pass.

It is situated in the immediate vicinity of the Oglallia and Brule divisions of the Sioux nation, and but little remote from the Cheyennes and Arapaho tribes. Its structure is a fair specimen of most of the establishments employed in the Indian trade. Its walls are "adobies," (sun-baked brick,) four feet thick, by twenty high -- enclosing an area of two hundred and fifty feet in length, by two hundred broad. At the northwest and southwest corners are bastions which command its approaches in all directions.

Within the walls are some twelve buildings in all, consisting as follows: Office, store, warehouse, meat-house, smith's shop, carpenter's shop, kitchen, and five dwellings, -- so arranged as to form a yard and corel, sufficiently large for the accommodation and security of more than two hundred head of animals. the number of men usually employed about the establishment is some thirty, whose chief duty it is to promote the interests of the trade, and otherwise act as circumstances require.

The Fort is located in a level plain, fertile and interesting, bounded upon all sides by hills, many of which present to view the nodding forms of pines and cedars, that bescatter their surface, -- while the river bottoms, at various points, are thickly studded with proud growths of cottonwood, ash, willow, and box-elder, thus affordings its needful supplies of timber and fuel.

In 1946, an account stated that the fort was "deserted and ruinous".
