= Richard Bullock =

Richard ″Dick″ Bullock
- Born: 20 August 1847; Ruthvoes, St Columb Major
- Died: 7 February 1920 (aged 72); Thorncroft Sanatorium, Glendale, California
- Other names: Dead-eye Dick; Deadwood Dick
- Occupations: miner guard stockbroker
- Known for: Guard on the Deadwood stagecoach

Richard Bullock (20 August 1847 –7 February 1920) was a Cornishman who once sang in a Methodist choir and later became a legendary figure of the Wild West Cowboy era. His quick-shooting deeds working on the Deadwood stage gained him the nickname "Deadwood Dick".

== Biography ==
Early in life Bullock's family moved to nearby hamlet of Retew where his father, Captain John Bullock, became the manager of a local clay-works. He and his brother shared many common traits: each very strong, ardent Free Methodists, and great sporting shooters—-a skill that brought him many trophies.

In his mid-twenties, Bullock immigrated to America. He began working in the Black Hills of South Dakota first as a miner, and then as a bullion guard for the Homestake Mine, which at that time was owned by Senator George Hearst, father of William Randolph Hearst. A bullion guard is somebody who protects gold shipments being transported by stagecoach. Around the age of 35, Bullock began to achieve fame. It is claimed that Bullock had a part in the death of Black Hills outlaw Cornelius Donahue (also known as "Lame Johnny"), although some sources dispute this. In later years Bullock was a stockbroker in Lead, South Dakota. He died at Thorncroft Sanatorium, Glendale, California, on February 7, 1920 at the age of 72.
