= Denver Doll =

Fictional character

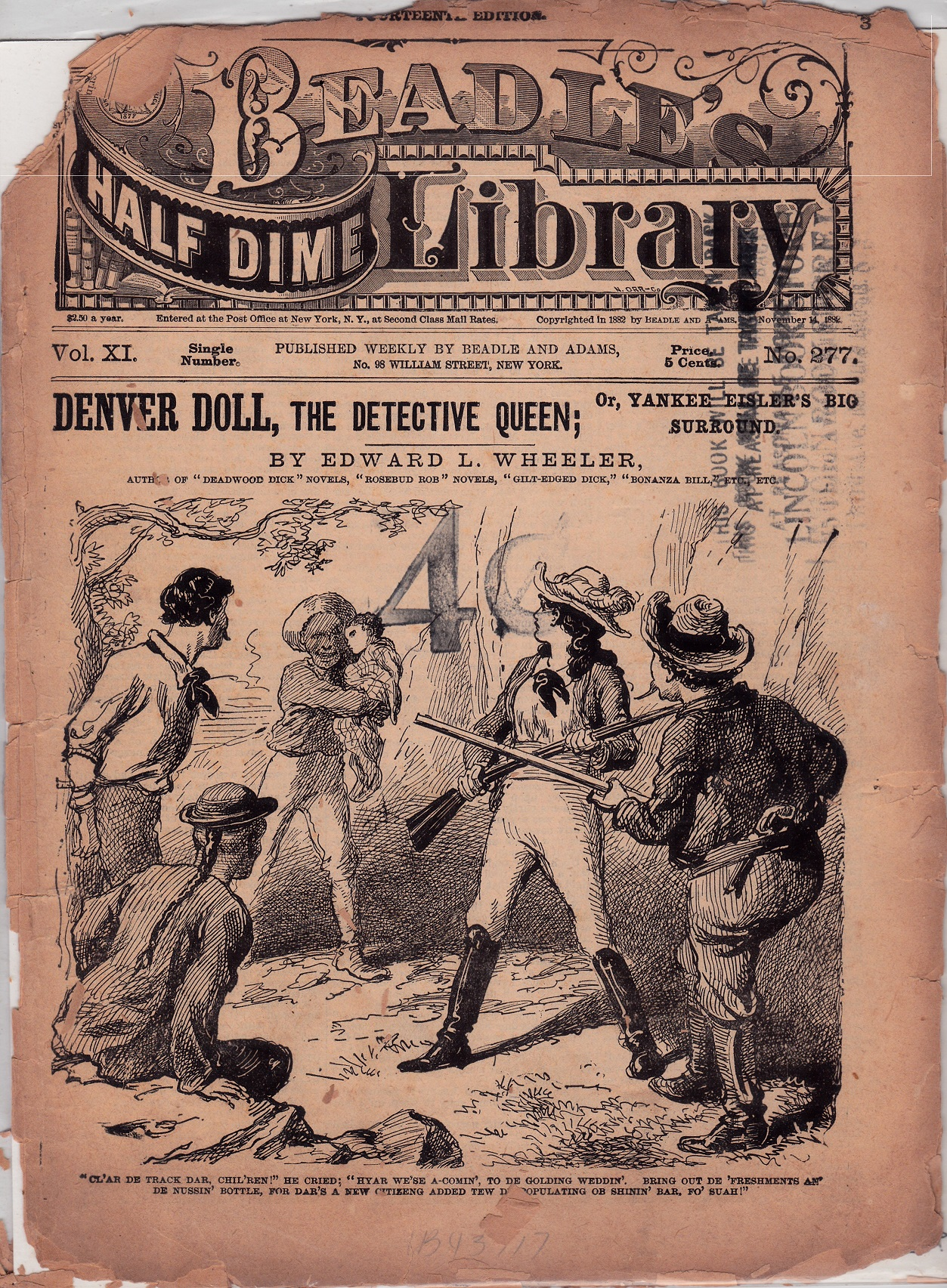
- Beadle's Half Dime Library No. 277, November 14, 1882, featuring ""Denver Doll the Detective Queen"
- Author: Edward Lytton Wheeler
- Genre: Western, detective
- Published: 1882

Denver Doll is a fictional character created by Edward Lytton Wheeler, author of the Deadwood Dick dime novels. She originally appeared in four novels in Beadle's Half-Dime Library, which were reprinted in the Beadle's Pocket Library, Deadwood Dick Library and in Aldine Boys' First-Rate Pocket Library in England.

Denver Doll was the first complete American female detective novel. The first American lady detective to appear in print was Lady Kate, the Dashing Female Detective in the Fireside Companion beginning in August 1882, but the story was not completed until the December issue.

Because of the scarcity of the original Denver Doll novel, some scholars could not determine her status in the appearance timeline. Her age is not given, except to say that she is older than 18 years of age, and is a sharpshooter, card player and disguise artist.

The first dime novel appearance described her: She had "rich brown hair fell in rippling waves half way to her waist. A plumed slouch hat of snow white; an elegant suit of gray, and patent leather top boots, with a diamond studded 'boiled' shirt, collar, and a sash about her waist beneath the coat made up her costume, and gave her an appearance at once dashing, and characteristic of the wild roving existence she led." In the novel "Denver Doll's Drift" she is revealed to be a mine-owner.

== Appearances ==
- Beadle's Half-Dime Library Vol. XI. No. 277, November 14, 1882, "Denver Doll the Detective Queen; or, Yankee Eisler's Big Surround" by Edward L. Wheeler.
- Beadle's Half-Dime Library Vol. XI. No. 281, December 10, 1882, "Denver Doll's Victory; or, Skull and Cross-Bones" by Edward L. Wheeler.
- Beadle's Half-Dime Library Vol. XI. No. 285, January 7, 1883, "Denver Doll's Decoy; or, Little Bill's Bonanza" by Edward L. Wheeler.
- Beadle's Half-Dime Library Vol. XI. No. 296, "Denver Doll's Drift; or, The Road Queen's Big Campaign" by Edward L. Wheeler.
- Beadle's Pocket Library No. 252, November 7, 1888, "Denver Doll's Device; or, The Detective Queen" by Edward L. Wheeler.
- Beadle's Pocket Library No. 258, December 26, 1888, "Denver Doll as Detective; or, Little Bill's Bold Task" by Edward L. Wheeler. Reprint of Half-Dime Library No. 281.
- Beadle's Pocket Library No. 264, January 30, 1889, "Denver Doll's Partner; or, Big Buckskin, the Sport" by Edward L. Wheeler. Reprint of Half-Dime Library No. 285.
- Beadle's Pocket Library No. 270, March 13, 1889, "Denver Doll's Mine; or, Little Bill's Big Loss" by Edward L. Wheeler. Reprint of Half-Dime Library No. 296.
- Deadwood Dick Library Vol. V No. 53, 1899, featuring "Denver Doll's Device; or, The Detective Queen" by Edward L. Wheeler.
- Deadwood Dick Library Vol. V No. 54, 1899, featuring "Denver Doll as Detective" by Edward L. Wheeler.
- Deadwood Dick Library Vol. V No. 55, 1899, featuring "Denver Doll's Partner; or, Big Buckskin, the Sport" by Edward L. Wheeler.
- Deadwood Dick Library Vol. V No. 56, 1899, featuring "Denver Doll's Mine; or, Little Bill's Big Loss" by Edward L. Wheeler.
- Aldine Boys' First-Rate Pocket Library No. 252, "Denver Doll the Detective Queen" by Edward L. Wheeler (British reprint).
- Aldine Boys' First-Rate Pocket Library No. 258, "Denver Doll's Victory" by Edward L. Wheeler (British reprint).
- Aldine Boys' First-Rate Pocket Library No. 264, "Denver Doll's Decoy" by Edward L. Wheeler (British reprint).
- Aldine Boys' First-Rate Pocket Library No. 270, "Denver Doll's Drift" by Edward L. Wheeler (British reprint).
- The Steam Man of the West series by Joseph Lovece, 2013, Createspace.
- Denver Doll the Detective Queen by Joseph Lovece, 2014, Createspace.
