= Calamity, a Childhood of Martha Jane Cannary =

2020 French-Danish film directed by Rémi Chayé

- French theatrical release poster
- Directed by: Rémi Chayé
- Screenplay by: Rémi Chayé; Sandra Tosello; Fabrice de Costil
- Produced by: Henri Magalon; Claire La Combe; Claus Toksvig Kjae
- Starring: Salomé Boulven; Alexandra Lamy; Alexis Tomassian
- Edited by: Benjamin Massoubre
- Music by: Florencia Di Concilio
- Production companies: Maybe Movies; Nølum; 2 Minutes; France 3 Cinéma
- Distributed by: Gebeka Films
- Release dates: 28 June 2020 (Lyon); 30 August 2020 (Angoulême); 14 October 2020 (France)
- Running time: 85 minutes
- Countries: France; Denmark
- Languages: French; Danish

Calamity, a Childhood of Martha Jane Cannary (French: Calamity, une enfance de Martha Jane Cannary) is a 2020 French-Danish Western animated family feature film directed by Rémi Chayé. The film is loosely based on the life of the American frontierswoman Calamity Jane.

The film is set in 1863. It depicts Jane's migration across the Oregon Trail, and her attempts to prove that she is capable of surviving in the Wild West.

== Plot ==
In 1863, during the Colorado gold rush, Martha Jane Cannary, her father, and her sisters are traveling with a caravan across America to Oregon. When her father is injured by their horse, she feels compelled to step up and take responsibility for their family's carriage. However, the leader of their group, Abraham, assigns his son Ethan to take over for Martha's father instead. Conflict ensues between Martha and Ethan as she fights to break free of the gender role assigned to her while he struggles to earn his father's approval. Martha decides to secretly spend her nights training to lasso and ride a horse and making pants for herself—something that was taboo since women were expected to wear dresses and skirts.

One day, their group encounters an American soldier, Samson, who informs them that they are heading in the wrong direction. While Abraham is chagrined by this challenge to his authority, the group decides to trust the soldier and change course. Martha grows close to the soldier as he helps her take over control of her family's carriage from Ethan. After a particularly bad fight with Ethan, in which he takes advantage of being able to pull her hair, she decides to cut it off. One night, the soldier mysteriously disappears along with a few valuable items from the group. The caravan suspects that Martha helped the soldier steal their items, so she decides to leave her family behind.

Having become an outcast to both her family and friends, Martha decides to run away to search for the soldier who robbed them with the help of the dog the latter has left behind. Her plan is to follow his trail through Colorado to Wyoming, where she believes he is bound. Along the way, in the wilderness, she meets a young man whom she saves from a bear, Jonas, who also travels on his own, looking for a way to make money. Though she at first tricks him into thinking that she was a boy and that her family would offer a reward for her safe return, they eventually become friends after escaping being captured by another group of travelers. Martha finds her way into a military camp, where she suspects the soldier to be.

Jane meets Madame Moustache and helps her find the gold in the mine she owns; in return, she helps Martha sneak into the military camp. When she finds Samson, she discovers that Ethan was the one who gave him the items in order to bribe him to leave the group. Jonas decides to work Madame Moustache's gold mine, and Martha eventually is able to find and return to her caravan. By proving to them that being female does not stop her from being capable of surviving in the Wild West, she is accepted back into the group.

== Cast ==
- Salomé Boulven as Martha Jane Cannary
- Alexandra Lamy as Madame Moustache
- Alexis Tomassian as Samson
- Jochen Hägele as Abraham
- Léonard Louf as Jonas
- Santiago Barban as Ethan
- Damien Witecka as Robert
- Bianca Tomassian as Eve
- Jérémy Bardeau as Carson
- Philippe Vincent as Paterson
- Jérôme Keen as Colonel
- Pascal Casanova as Sherif
- Violette Samama as Stella
- Lévanah Solomon as Esther
- Délia Régis as Lena
- Max Brunner as Elijah
- Gaspar Bellegarde as Joe
- Kylian Trouillard as Joshua
- Jean-Michel Vaubien as Louis

== Music ==
Calamity, a Childhood of Martha Jane Cannary

Soundtrack album by Florencia di Concilio
- Released: 14 October 2020
- Genre: Film score
- Label: 22D Music

The original music for the film was composed by Florencia di Concilio. A soundtrack album, consisting of 23 songs from the film, was released digitally on 14 October 2020 by 22D Music.

Track Listing

Calamity, a Childhood of Martha Jane Cannary (Original Motion Picture Soundtrack)
No.	Title	Length
1.	"Calamity, Opening"	1:56
2.	"Reverie"	0:46
3.	"The Carcass"	0:42
4.	"The Caravans"	0:47
5.	"Scorn"	0:43
6.	"Becoming Calamity"	3:48
7.	"Crossing the Valley"	1:12
8.	"Bedtime Stories"	1:22
9.	"Who Do You Think You Are?"	1:32
10.	"Ostracism"	1:11
11.	"Lock Her Up!"	0:53
12.	"Escape"	1:50
13.	"Encounter"	0:36
14.	"Jonas"	1:22
15.	"Breaking the Chain"	1:01
16.	"Hot Springs"	1:46
17.	"The Vein"	2:01
18.	"The Costume"	1:26
19.	"The Haul"	1:11
20.	"Calamity, Epilog"	5:16
21.	"Calamity, End Credits"	2:57
22.	"Je m'appelle Calamity"	3:11
23.	"Becoming Calamity (Version 2)"	2:08

== Release ==
Calamity had a limited release in France in June 2020. It then played in the feature film category for the Annecy International Animation Film Festival that was held virtually due to the COVID-19 pandemic, where it won the Cristal for a Feature Film.

The film made its US premiere at the FIAF Animation First Film Festival on February 5, 2021.

=== Critical response ===
The film has been praised for its unique minimalist visual style that forgoes using outlines for characters and objects. Fabier Lemercier comments on how it "favours the simplicity of the line in an explosion of colours."

However, the ending of the film was critiqued by Vassilis Kroustallis, who says it "tries to tie all loose ends in the final act, and seems to lose sight of the fact that the real Calamity had to re-create her own community from the start -instead of going back to her old ways."

== Accolades ==
List of awards and nominations
Award	Date	Category	Recipients	Result	Ref.
Annecy International Animated Film Festival	20 June 2020	Cristal for a Feature Film	Rémi Chayé	Won	
Bucheon International Animation Film Festival	27 October 2020	Jury Prize	Henri Magalon Claire La Combe	Won	
Bucheon International Animation Film Festival	27 October 2020	COCOMICS Music Prize	Florencia di Concilio	Won	
Cinekid	16 October 2020	Best Children's Film	Henri Magalon Claire La Combe	Won	
European Film Awards	12 December 2020	European Animated Feature Film	Rémi Chayé	Nominated	

== See also ==
- Calamity Jane
- History of French animation
