= Fort Laramie Three-Mile Hog Ranch =

- U.S. National Register of Historic Places
- Location within Wyoming Location within the United States
- Nearest city: Fort Laramie, Wyoming
- Coordinates: 42°11′49″N 104°37′20″W
- Built: 1873
- NRHP reference No.: 75001901
- Added to NRHP: April 23, 1975

The Fort Laramie Three-Mile Hog Ranch was built to serve as a social center away from the soldiers' post at historic Fort Laramie, a 19th-century military post in eastern Wyoming. It became notorious as a place for gambling and drinking, and for prostitution, with at least ten prostitutes always in residence. The location is notable as an example of one of only a few military bordellos still standing in the United States by 1974, the time of its nomination to the National Register of Historic Places. The Fort Laramie site was one of a number of so-called "hog ranches" that appeared along trails in Wyoming.

Located about 3 miles (4.8 km) from old Fort Laramie, the ranch was established in 1873 by Jules Ecoffey and Adolph Cuny as a trading post and saloon. The next year prostitution was added as a further attraction. One of the young prostitutes was said to be Martha Jane Cannary, more popularly known in later years as Calamity Jane.

Both Ecoffey and Cuny had died by 1877. However, the site remained important as a social, commercial and transportation center, the nearest town of any size being Cheyenne, 85 miles (137 km) away. The Cheyenne and Black Hills Stagecoach Company operated a hotel for stagecoach passengers, which apparently coexisted with the bordello, both operating until the stage line was abandoned in 1887.

The ranch was described by U.S. Army Lieutenant John Gregory Bourke:

... tenanted by as hardened and depraved set of witches as could be found on the face of the globe. It [was] a rum mill of the worst kind [with] half a dozen Cyprians, virgins whose lamps were always burning brightly in expectancy of the coming of the bridegroom, and who lured to destruction the soldiers of the garrison. In all my experience I have never seen a lower, more beastly set of people of both sexes.

Two structures remain: a U-shaped lime-grout building that housed the bar and had several rooms and a cellar, and a wooden barn. (Lime-grout was used as an early form of concrete.) Other buildings, now vanished, included a barn with loopholes for defense, eight "cribs" or two-room cabins for prostitutes, shops, and a pool hall.

The Fort Laramie Three-Mile Hog Ranch was placed on the National Register of Historic Places in 1975.
