= Deadwood Dick =

Fictional character

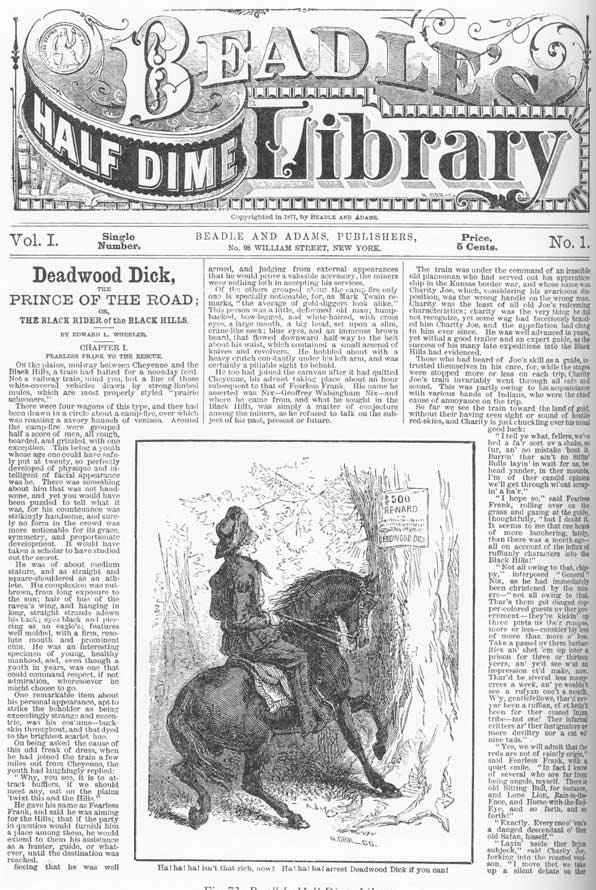
Edward L. Wheeler. Deadwood Dick, the Prince of the Road; or, The Black Rider of the Black Hills. 1877.

Deadwood Dick is a fictional character who appears in a series of stories, or dime novels, published between 1877 and 1897 by Edward Lytton Wheeler (1854/5–1885). The name became so widely known in its time that it was used to advantage by several men who actually resided in Deadwood, South Dakota.

== Plot and historical ==
The first novel featuring Deadwood Dick is Deadwood Dick, the Prince of the Road; or, The Black Rider of the Black Hills. This legendary Wild West dime novel was originally published in 1877. The classic pulp fiction tale introduced the iconic, masked outlaw-hero and his colorful cast of frontier companions—including Calamity Jane—to American readers.

In 1877, aspiring author Edward Lytton Wheeler desperately needed a hero for a new series of pulp Westerns. Because established frontiersmen like Buffalo Bill were already being used in popular literature, Wheeler created his own legend (fakelore). He crafted a masked, sharpshooting, and romanticized outlaw who patrolled the Black Hills of Dakota Territory. Wheeler added a brilliant literary twist by placing his fictional hero in real-life locations and having him interact with actual historical figures, like Calamity Jane. This blurred the line between fact and fiction, leading many readers to believe Deadwood Dick was a real person.

== Cast of characters ==
The Fictional Dime Novel Characters (Edward L. Wheeler)

- Deadwood Dick (Edward Dick): The dashing, mysterious, jet-black-buckskin-clad bandit-turned-hero who fought for the weak and ruled the Black Hills.
- Calamity Jane: Wheeler fictionalized the real-life Martha Jane Cannary into a gun-slinging, hard-riding ally/lover of Deadwood Dick. She appeared in twenty of his stories, bearing little relation to her actual historical life.
- Deadwood Dick Jr.: The son of Deadwood Dick, who was introduced in later serialized stories to carry on his father's adventures.
- Old Avalanche the Annihilator: A humorous, boastful giant and steadfast friend to Deadwood Dick.
- Denver Doll: A recurring female companion and equal-opportunity adventurer in the dime novels.

== People who used the nickname ==
Those who took the nickname included:

- Frank Palmer, gambler, according to his obituary of May 30, 1906, was the original "Deadwood Dick" who, at the age of 17 (c. 1879) went west from Springfield, Illinois, to Deadwood, South Dakota, where he made his fortune playing games of chance. He was dubbed "Deadwood Dick" by fellow gamblers. Palmer was the hero of Beadle's half-dime novels.
- Nat Love (1854–1921), an African-American cowboy;
- Dick Brown, an actor;
- Richard Cole, a stage coach driver;
- Richard Clarke, also an actor; the Deadwood Chamber of Commerce asked him in 1927 to portray Deadwood Dick in the city's annual Days of '76 Parade. Clarke's work was managed by publicity man Bert Bell. Among other assignments, Clarke was sent east to invite then-U.S. President Calvin Coolidge to Deadwood. Clarke appreciated the celebrity status so much that he continued playing Deadwood Dick until his death on May 5, 1930
- Cornishman Richard Bullock, gunman and bullion guard on the Deadwood Stage (1847–1921).

Others more briefly associated with the name were Richard Palmer, who died in Cripple Creek, Colorado, in 1906, and Robert Dickey, who died in a Denver hospital jail in 1912.

== Television adaptation ==
The syndicated anthology television series Death Valley Days presented a 1966 episode entitled "The Resurrection of Deadwood Dick," with character actor Denver Pyle in the starring role.
