= Valentine McGillycuddy =

United States Indian agent

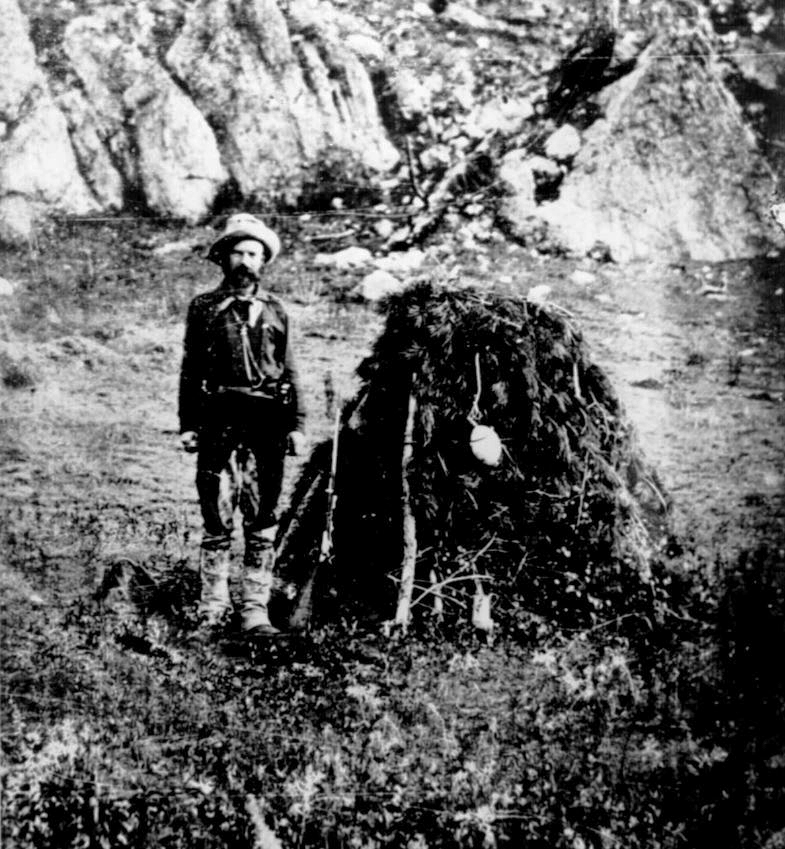
- McGillycuddy on General George Crook's Black Hills expedition

Mayor of Rapid City, South Dakota
- In office 1896–1898
- Preceded by: Chauncey Lynch Wood
- Succeeded by: George B. Mansfield

President of the South Dakota School of Mines and Technology
- In office 1893–1897
- Preceded by: Walter P. Jenney
- Succeeded by: Robert L. Slagle

Personal details
- Born: Valentine Trant McGillycuddy; February 14, 1849 Racine, Wisconsin, U.S.
- Died: June 6, 1939 (aged 90) Berkeley, California, U.S.
- Resting place: Black Elk Peak; 43°51′57″N 103°31′57″W

Valentine Trant McGillycuddy (February 14, 1849 – June 6, 1939) was an American surgeon who served with expeditions and United States military forces in the West. He was considered controversial for his efforts to build a sustainable relationship between the United States and Native American peoples.

== Biography ==
=== Early life ===
Valentine Trant O'Connell McGillycuddy or M'Gillycuddy was born on February 14, 1849, in Racine, Wisconsin to Irish immigrants Daniel McGillycuddy, a merchant, and Joana (Trant) McGillycuddy. He had a brother 6 years older named Francis. When Valentine was 13, the McGillycuddy family moved to Detroit.

He graduated from the Detroit Medical School at 20 years of age. He began working as a doctor at the Wayne County Insane Asylum and practiced medicine for one year. Next he began teaching at the medical college. McGillycuddy's longstanding love for the outdoors led him to leave the city medical field.

=== Career ===
From 1871 to 1874, McGillycuddy worked for the United States Boundary Survey Commission. He became a topographer and surgeon for the International Expedition. This group headed an expedition to define the border between the United States and Canada along the 49th parallel. They began their expedition in North Dakota, where the ground had frozen due to a wet season. In order to keep their feet warm, the men wore several pairs of socks, wrapped their feet in a square blanket, and last wore a pair of over-sized moccasins. After the expedition ended, McGillycuddy returned to Washington, DC. He was soon sent out to Wyoming to continue his career as a topographer. McGillycuddy is credited with the discovery of the original warm mineral springs in Hot Springs.

The following year, in 1875, he was invited on the Newton–Jenney Party. As the surveyor for the expedition, McGillycuddy was the first person to record their climb of Harney Peak (now Black Elk Peak) in the Black Hills of South Dakota. He was responsible for mapping the topography and geology of the region, while the expedition assessed the area for major gold deposits.

Upon returning from the expedition, McGillycuddy married Fanny Hoyt. He was recruited as the Contract Surgeon with General George Crook during the Battle of the Rosebud (June 17, 1876), the Battle of Slim Buttes (September 9 and 10, 1876), and the Horsemeat March (1876).

==== Relations with Indians ====
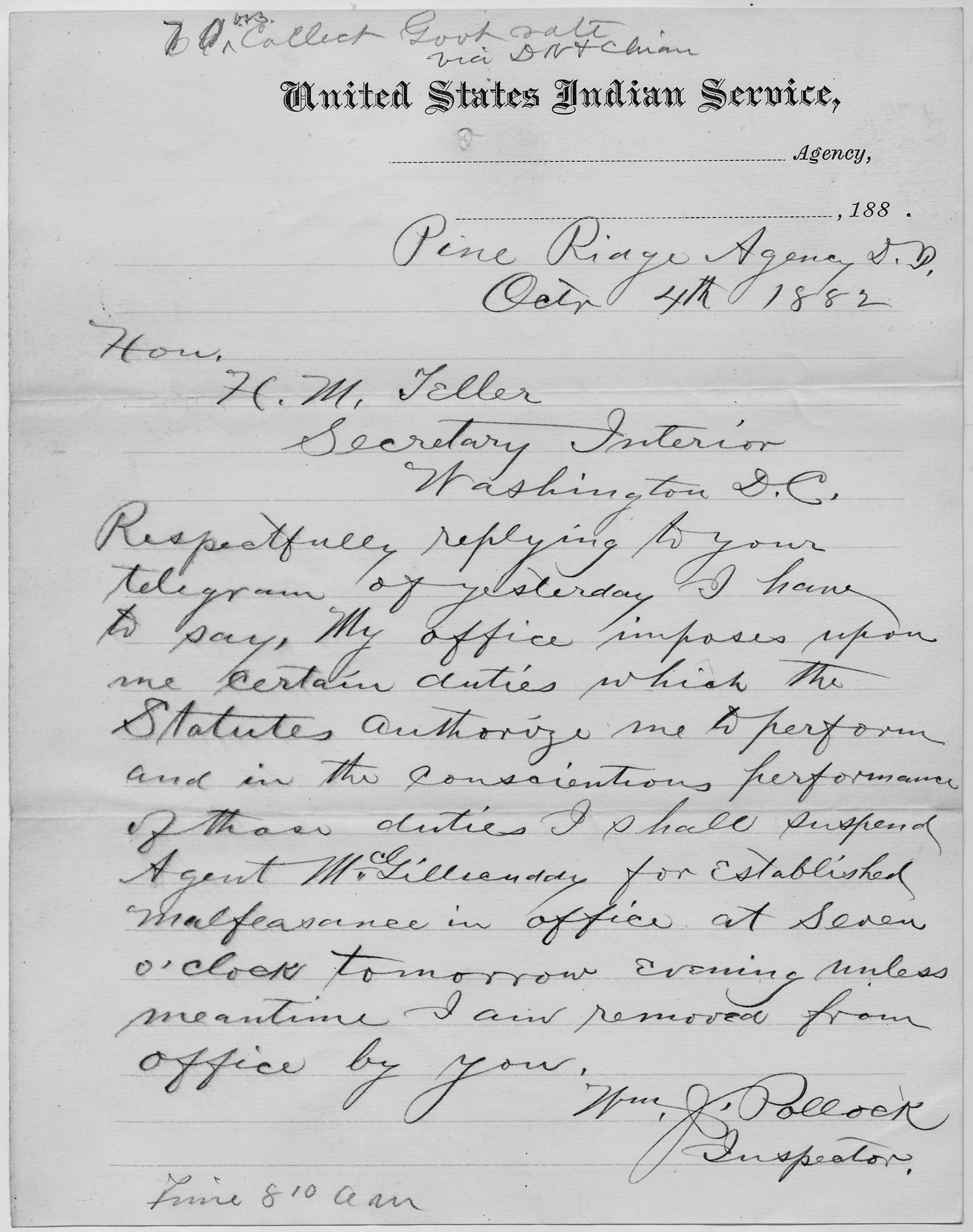
Suspension Letter of McGillycuddy

McGillycuddy was appointed Assistant Post Surgeon at Fort Robinson in what became Nebraska. Because of his mustache that drooped to a length of two inches below the corners of his mouth, the Sioux named him "Putin hi chikala" or "Little Whiskers."

He was known to the Lakota at the agency as a "Friend of Crazy Horse," a notable Lakota leader. McGillycuddy treated Crazy Horse after he was fatally stabbed by guards who said he was trying to escape. After Crazy Horse's death in 1877, McGillycuddy went to Washington, D.C., to lobby for more humane treatment of Indians at Fort Robinson.

McGillycuddy was appointed as Indian Agent in 1879, when he was 30. He served at the Pine Ridge Agency (now Pine Ridge Indian Reservation in South Dakota). He did not manage to achieve such friendly relations here as he had with Crazy Horse and other Lakota. Red Cloud, a major chief, accused McGillycuddy of mismanagement, leading to several investigations of the Agent's administration. Despite this, McGillycuddy established an Indian police force, and set up a boarding school to educate Indian children of the region. However, persistent claims followed him of tyranny, fraud and the graft typical of the 'Indian Ring', including one in the Boston Advertiser claiming that he had been in receipt of annuities for 2,600 more people than actually lived at Pine Ridge, a loss to the Government of $284,700. Ostensibly under pressure to fire a loyal clerk for no reason he could see, McGillycuddy eventually resigned his post. He was suspended from his position in October 1882 (see letter above).

Later, in the days leading up to the Wounded Knee Massacre (1890), Red Cloud said that McGillycuddy had been a "young man with an old man's head on his shoulders."

==== Other government appointments ====
After leaving Pine Ridge, McGillycuddy settled in Rapid City, South Dakota. He would later serve as president of Lakota Bank and as Dean of the South Dakota School of Mines and Technology. He also was appointed as South Dakota's first State Surgeon General. While living in Rapid City, he built a mansion in 1888, which is still standing.

In 1890 McGillycuddy was elected as a delegate to the South Dakota State Constitutional Convention. Continuing his activism in politics, he was elected mayor of Rapid City in 1897. His wife, Fanny, died that same year.

=== Later life ===
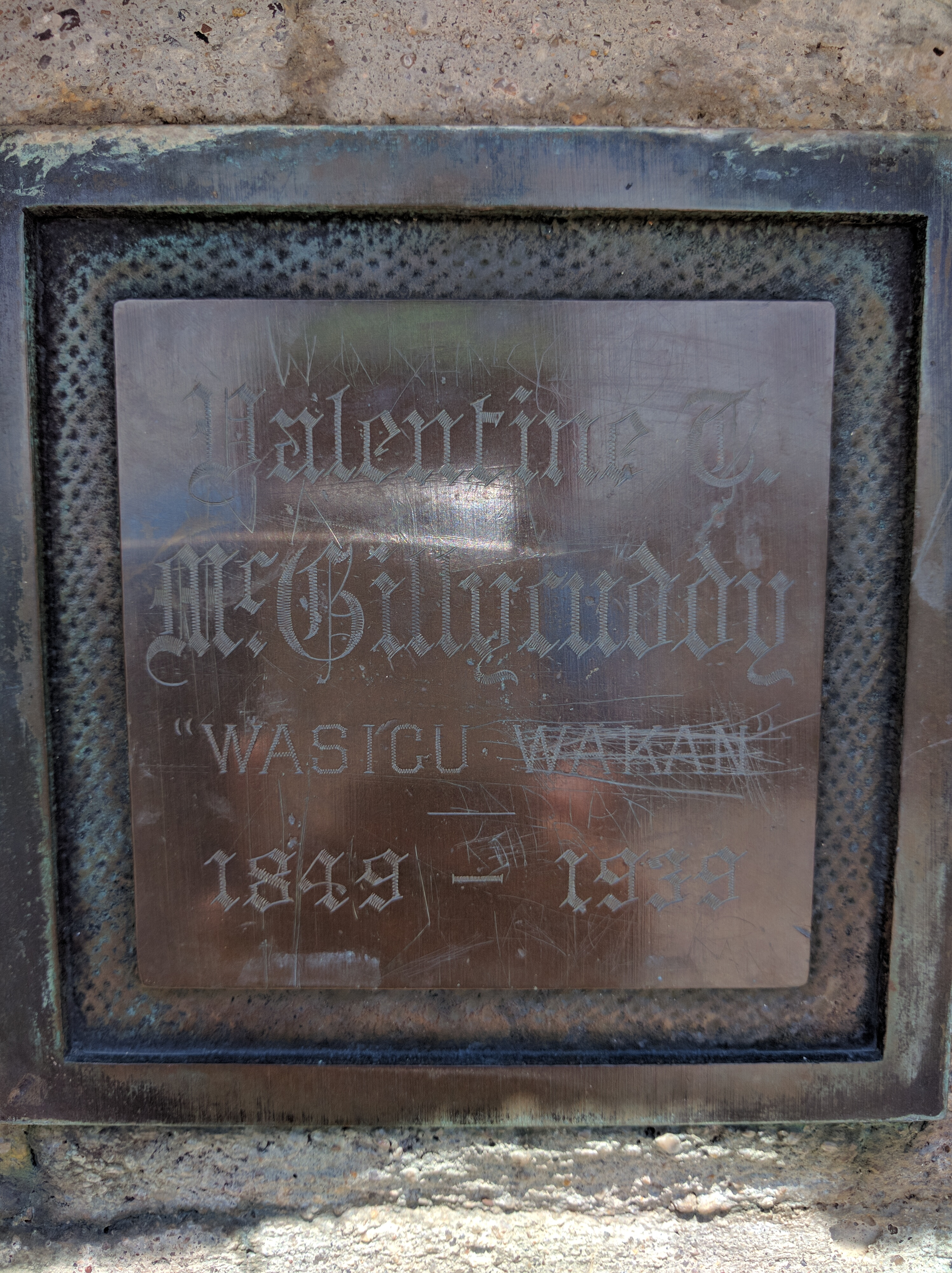
Plaque on Black Elk Peak engraved with the words Valentine T. McGillycuddy "Wasicu Wakan" 1849–1939.

After Fanny died, the widower McGillycuddy moved to San Francisco, California. There he met Julia Blanchard, who as a girl had asked Fanny if she could marry the doctor after her death. A daughter, also named Valentine, was born to Julia. He served as a medical inspector for an insurance agency until retiring in 1912.

McGillycuddy came out of retirement to enlist in World War I. He was sent to Alaska and other western states to treat patients with influenza during the pandemic of 1918–1919.

McGillycuddy died in Berkeley, California, in 1939. He was cremated, and his ashes were entombed at the top of Black Elk Peak. A plaque was installed that reads: "Valentine T. McGillycuddy, ′Wasicu Wakan′, 1849–1939″ (In Lakota, Wasicu Wakan means ″Holy White Man″).

== Books based on McGillycuddy's life ==
Biographies

- McGillycuddy, Julia B. (1941). McGillycuddy, Agent (First ed.). H. Milford, Oxford University Press. ASIN B0007F33PM.
  - McGillycuddy, Julia B.; James C. Olson (Introduction) (1990). Blood on the Moon: Valentine McGillycuddy and the Sioux (1st ed.). University of Nebraska Press. ISBN 978-0803281707. - new edition of McGillycuddy, Agent
- Moulton, Candy (2015). Valentine T. McGillycuddy: Army Surgeon, Agent to the Sioux. Western Frontiersmen Series, Volume 35. University of Oklahoma Press. ISBN 9780806151410.
- Schaefer, Jack (1965). Heroes Without Glory: Some Goodmen of the Old West. Amereon Ltd. ISBN 9780891908784.

Novels

- O'Brien, Dan (1999). The Contract Surgeon (1st ed.). The Lyons Press. ISBN 9781558219328., historical novel for young adults
- O'Brien, Dan (2004). The Indian Agent: A Novel. The Lyons Press. ISBN 9781592282449.
