= Edward Lytton Wheeler =

American novelist

Edward Lytton Wheeler (1854/5 – 1885) was a nineteenth century American writer of dime novels. One of his most famous characters is the Wild West rascal Deadwood Dick. His stories of the west mixed fictional characters with real-life personalities of the era, including Calamity Jane and Sitting Bull.

== Life ==
Wheeler was born in Avoca, New York and later managed a theater company in Philadelphia. He created the seminal character of Deadwood Dick, during a period when the country was fascinated by the Black Hills region of the American west after Custer's defeat at Little Bighorn. Wheeler had never been to the Black Hills. He originally created Deadwood Dick as a character for his theater troupe, and later made him the focus of a dime novel series. The first episode was the first issue of Beadles Half-dime Library.

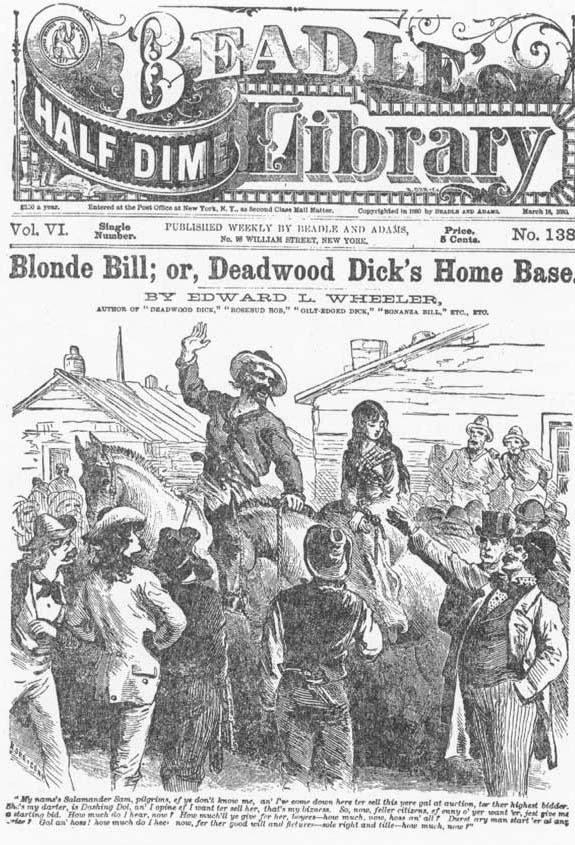
Blond Bill; or, Deadwood Dick's Home Base. A Romance of the "Silent Tongues." March 16, 1880

After the Civil War, dime novels were an extremely popular form of fiction. Wheeler mastered their formulaic style and was able to write dozens of them. He created around one hundred novels, of which 33 featured Deadwood Dick, and of these, Calamity Jane—a real-life wild west entertainer—appeared as a character in nearly half. Other real life people such as Sitting Bull also appeared in the stories. He also wrote story series with a number of other characters including Rosebud Bob, Sierra Sam, Kangaroo Kit, Yreka Jim, Denver Doll, and Lady Kate.
