= California Joe Milner =

American miner and frontier scout

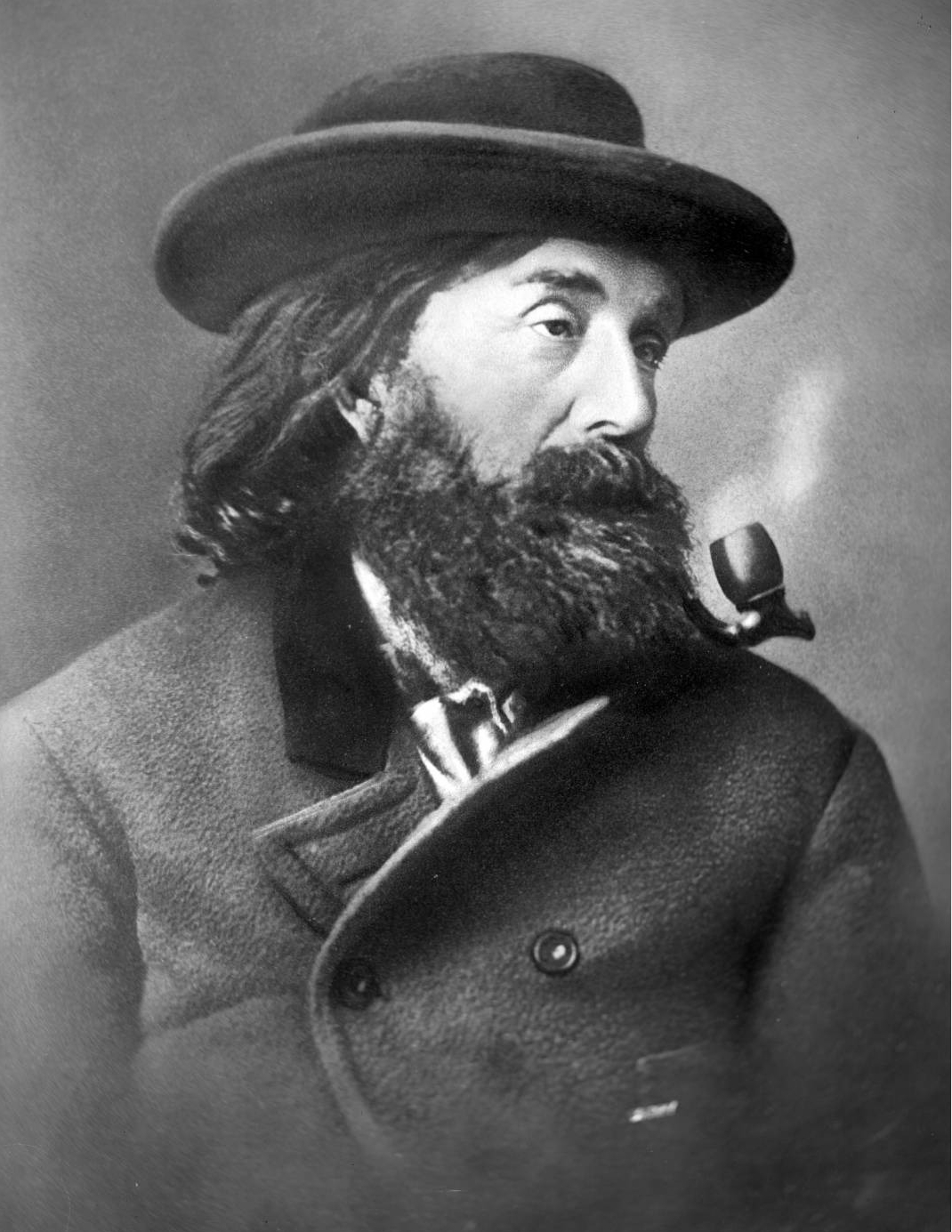
"California Joe" Milner in 1870

Moses Embree Milner (May 8, 1829 – October 29, 1876), also known as "California Joe", was an American miner and frontier scout.

== Biography ==
Moses Embree Milner was born in Stanford, Kentucky on May 8, 1829. At age 14 he moved west to St. Louis, Missouri for a short time and then on to Fort Laramie where he became a fur trapper.

In 1846, during the Mexican–American War, Milner began working as a scout for General Stephen W. Kearny and Colonel Alexander W. Doniphan. Following the war he married Nancy Watts and moved to California, where he became a gold prospector and was then known as "California Joe". In 1853, he left California and built a cattle ranch near Corvallis, Oregon.

In 1866, Milner was a scout based in Kansas at Fort Riley and later out of Fort Harker, where he became acquainted with Wild Bill Hickok and Texas Jack Omohundro. Then, in 1868, Milner was named Chief of Scouts for George Armstrong Custer in Fort Hays, but Custer soon found him drunk and immediately demoted him.

Milner returned to prospecting and ranching in 1870 near Picoche, Nevada. In 1875, he scouted for the Newton–Jenney geological expedition and remained in the Black Hills to prospect.

On an undisclosed winter night in late 1875, Milner and a man named Tom Newcomb stopped by the camp of John Richard and his nephew, Alfred Pallardie, near the headwaters of the Running Water. Richard and Pallardie had been trading with the Sioux between Fort Laramie and Fort Robinson. What happened next is unknown, but Newcomb arrived at Fort Robinson the next day claiming that Milner had murdered both Richard and Pallardie at their camp. Milner was soon apprehended at Fort Robinson, but he was eventually released due to a lack of evidence. While in custody, Milner blamed the murders on Newcomb. Eventually, the blame was placed on the Cheyenne Indians.

The fact that blame for the murders of Richard and Pallardie had been placed on Natives did not settle the matter. According to a witness named Frank Salaway, Milner continued accusing Newcomb of the killings. In turn, Newcomb declared that he would kill Milner on sight for the perceived slander. Matters came to a head in October 1876 at Fort Robinson, Nebraska, when Milner was shot by Newcomb. Milner was buried at Fort Robinson and now is at Fort McPherson National Cemetery.
