= Fort Laramie National Historic Site =

National Historic Site of the United States in Wyoming

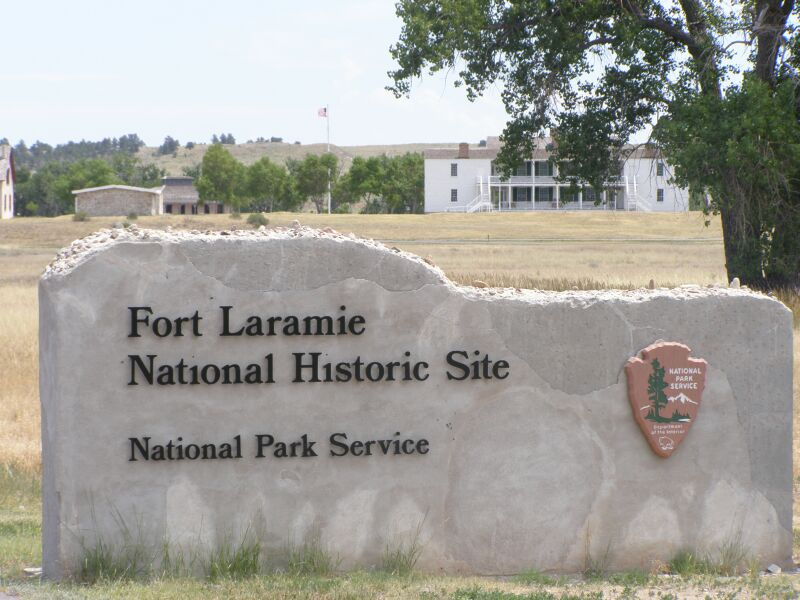

- Location within Wyoming Location within the United States
- Location: Goshen County, Wyoming, USA
- Nearest city: Torrington, Wyoming
- Coordinates: 42°12′33″N 104°32′9.1″W
- Area: 833 acres (337 ha)
- Established: March 4, 1931
- Visitors: 36,998 (in 2025)
- Governing body: National Park Service
- Website: Fort Laramie National Historic Site
- Fort Laramie National Historic Site
- U.S. National Register of Historic Places
- U.S. Historic district
- Nearest city: Fort Laramie, Wyoming
- Area: 536 acres (217 ha)
- Built: 1834
- Built by: US Army Corps of Engineers
- Architect: US Army Corps of Engineers
- Architectural style: Lime grout construction
- NRHP reference No.: 66000755
- Added to NRHP: October 15, 1966

Fort Laramie (/ˈlærəmi/; founded as Fort William and known for a while as Fort John) was a significant 19th-century trading post, diplomatic site, and military installation located at the confluence of the Laramie and the North Platte Rivers. They joined in the upper Platte River Valley in the eastern part of the present-day US state of Wyoming. The fort was founded as a private trading post in the 1830s to service the overland fur trade; in 1849, it was purchased by the United States Army. The site was located east of the long climb leading to the best and lowest crossing over the Rocky Mountains at South Pass and became a popular stop for migrants on the Oregon Trail. Along with Bent's Fort on the Arkansas River, the trading post and its supporting industries and businesses were the most significant economic hub of commerce in the region.

Fort William was founded by William Sublette and his partner Robert Campbell in 1834. In the spring of 1835, Sublette sold the fort to Thomas Fitzpatrick, a local fur trader. After a rendezvous in 1836, it was sold to the American Fur Company, which still had a virtual monopoly on the western fur trade. Starting as early as the fall of 1840, the American Fur Company began competing with the newly-established Fort Platte, built by Lancaster Lupton about a mile away from Fort William.

The American Fur Company hired workers from Santa Fe to construct an adobe fort to replace Fort William. This fort was named Fort John, after John Sarpy, a partner in the company. In 1849, the U.S. Army purchased the fort as a post to protect the many wagon trains of migrant travelers on the Oregon Trail, and the subsidiary northern emigrant trails which split off further west. These included the California and Mormon Trails. The middle reaches of the Mormon trail stayed on the north banks of the Platte and North Platte rivers, and merged with the other emigrant trails heading west over the continental divide from Fort Laramie. The name "Fort Laramie" gradually came into use, likely as a convenient shortening of "Fort John at the Laramie River".

The remaining structures are preserved as the Fort Laramie National Historic Site by the National Park Service.

== History ==
=== Name ===
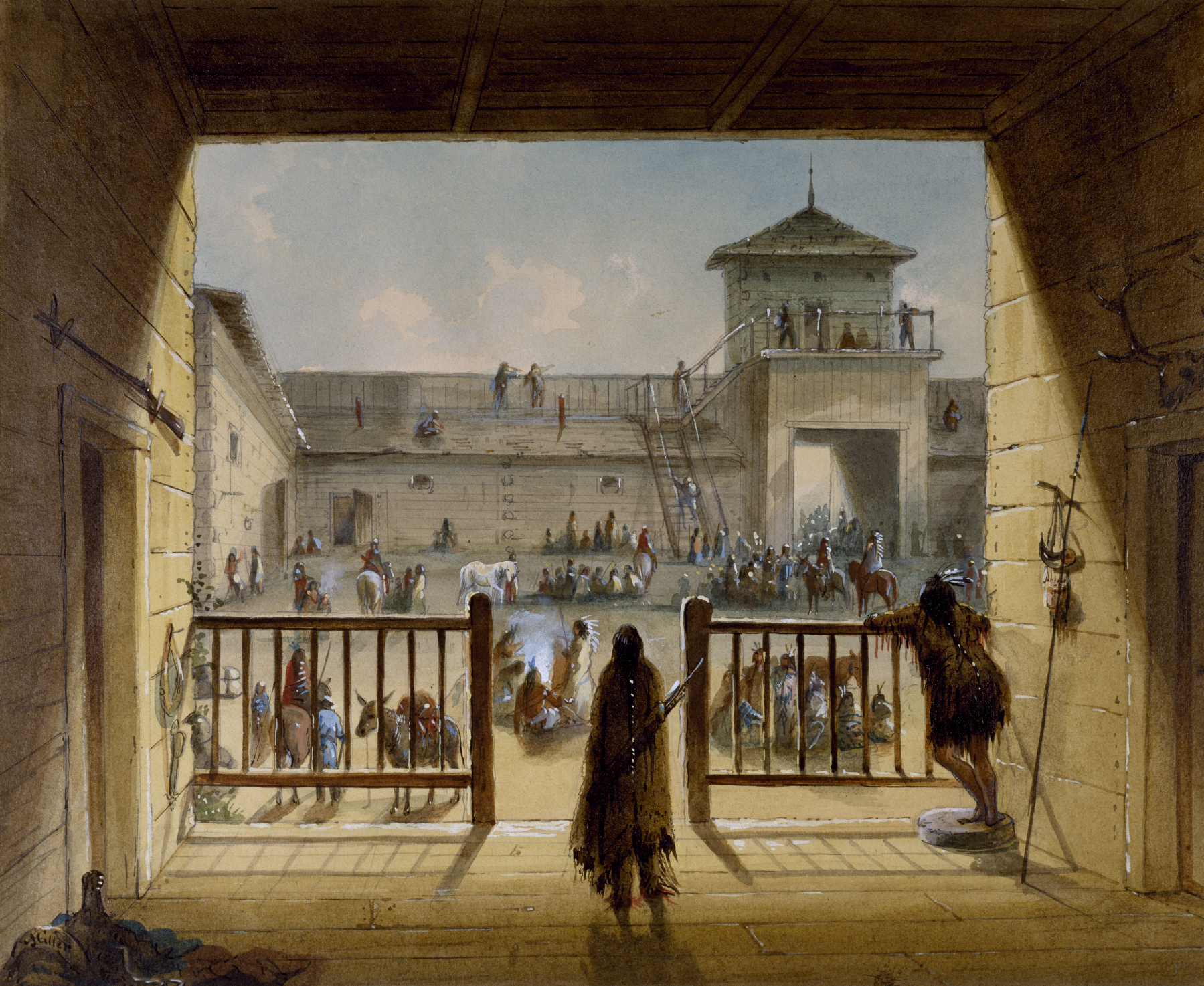
Interior of the original Fort Laramie as it looked prior to 1840. Painting from memory by Alfred Jacob Miller.

In 1815 or 1816, Jacques La Ramee and a small group of fellow trappers settled in the area where Fort Laramie would later be located. He went out alone to trap in 1819 or 1820 and was never seen again. Arapahoe Indians were accused of killing La Ramee and burying his body in a beaver dam. The river was named "Laramie" in his honor, and later settlers used this name for the Laramie Mountains, the fort, and the towns of Laramie, Wyoming and Fort Laramie, Wyoming.

=== Fur trade ===
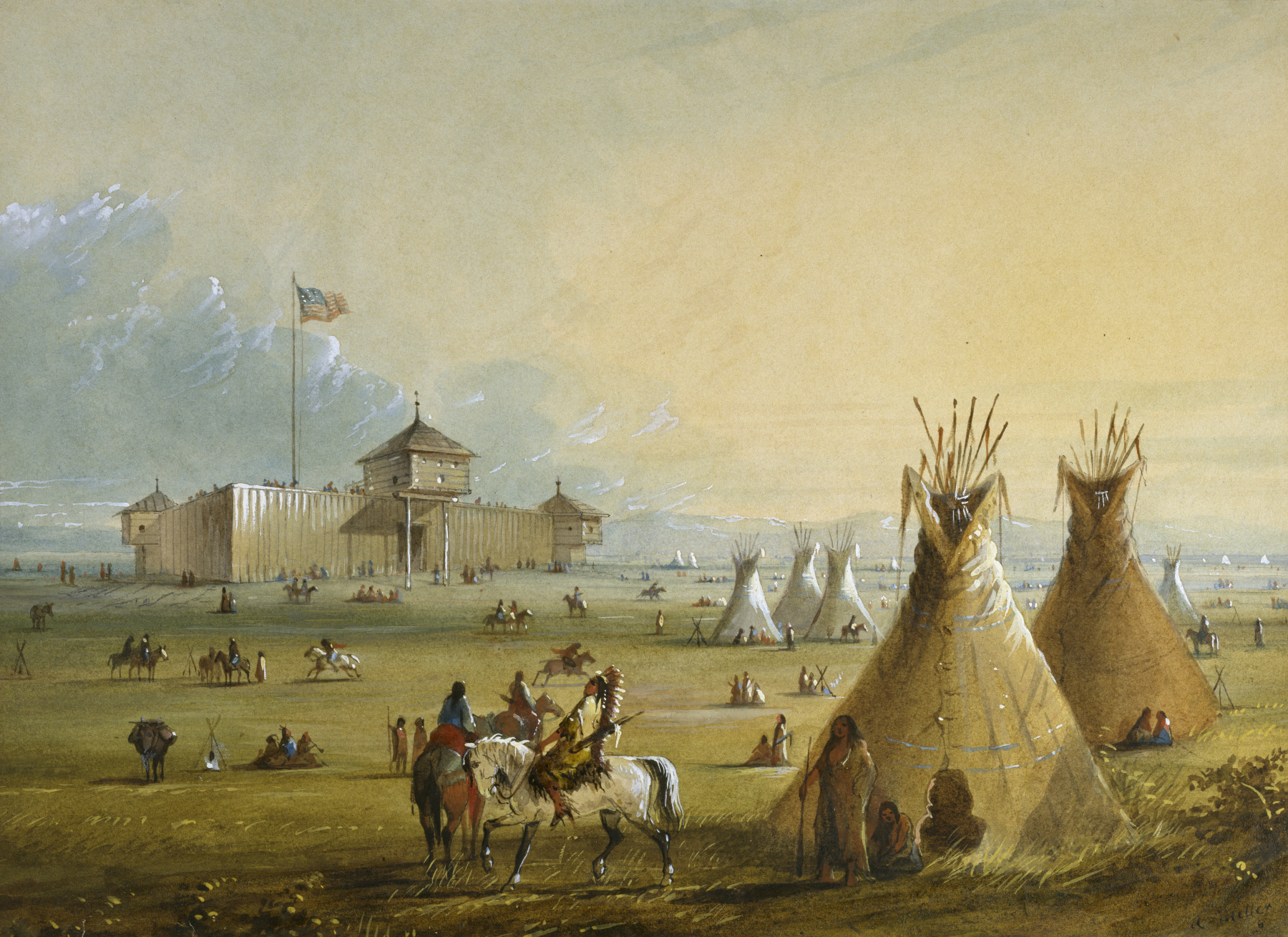
Fort William, the first Fort Laramie, as it looked prior to 1840. Painting from memory by Alfred Jacob Miller

The original fort was constructed in the 1830s, probably in 1833–1834 by William Sublette and Robert Campbell. The overland fur trade was still prosperous when Jim Bridger and Tom Fitzpatrick bought the place.

The fort was located near the confluence of two rivers, so it commanded a broad plain with water on two sides; these formed a partial natural moat. In addition, the nearby confluence of the North Platte's waters had a ford easily used by travelers on what later became the northern overland emigrant trails following the North Platte River west from Nebraska. With the opening of the Mormon Trail on the north bank of the Platte and North Platte, the fort was a junction for westbound travelers. It was an anchor roughly a quarter of the way to either California or Oregon on the famous Oregon Trail. To the west, the common trail leaving Fort John-Laramie later spins off to the Mormon and California trails further west along the road to the Rogue River Valley. The main trail passed northwest to Oregon's Willamette Valley and Oregon City.

One of the early principal owner-trappers was William Sublette, and the fort was called Fort William before being sold to the American Fur Company in 1841. (John Jacob Astor, the founder, had left his company a decade before.) The name was changed to Fort John after John Sarpy, a partner in the company. The 1846 treaties established relatively stable western territories after viable routes west had become well published. By the time the westward migration along the Oregon Trail had markedly increased, the US Army had become tenants in the fort as well. The fort was located along the Laramie River just south of its mouth onto the North Platte River.

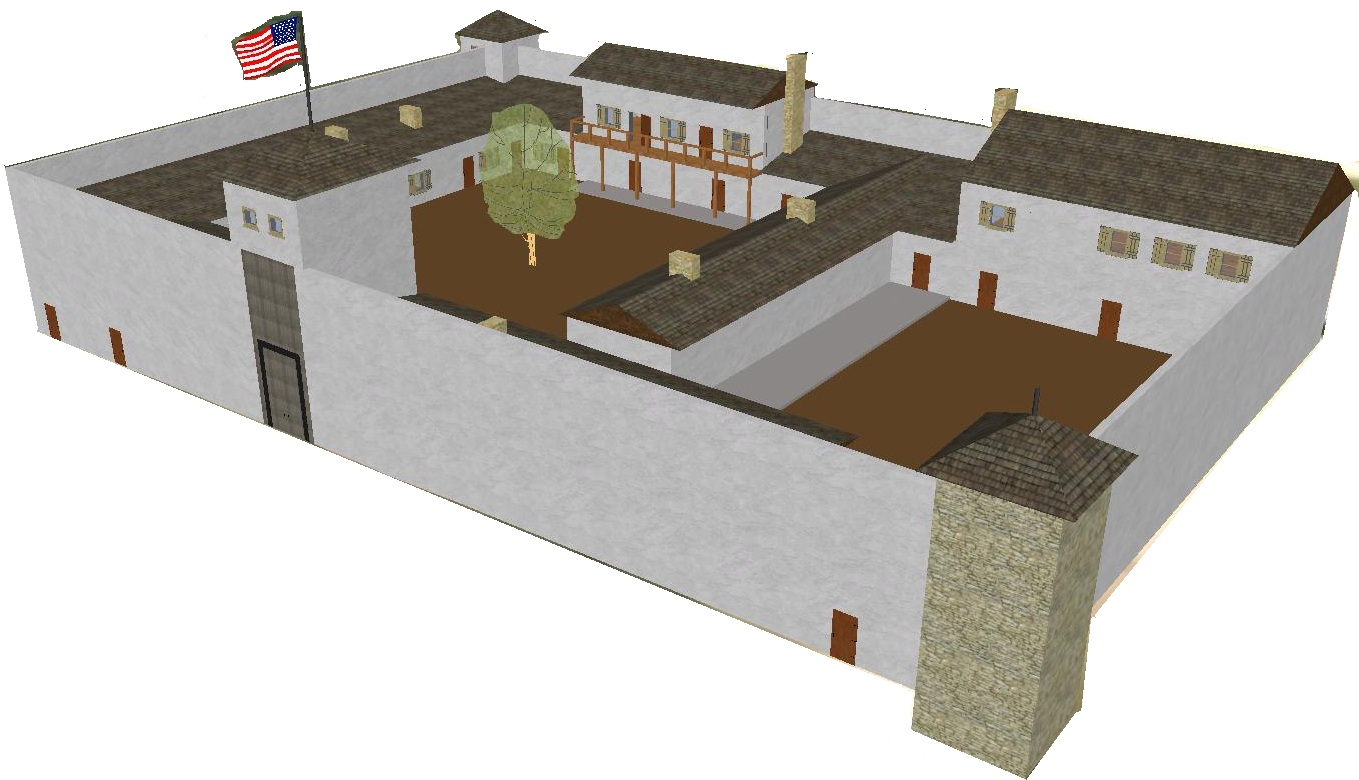
Fort John (Fort Laramie) was originally built of logs in 1834, then rebuilt in adobe in 1841. This digital reconstruction from a National Park Service/CyArk project is based on archaeological data, descriptions, and illustrations from the period when the Fort still stood. It shows the south and east facades of the high-walled Fort John. As a private trading post it was fortified chiefly to prevent theft of the valuable furs. The name Fort John fell into disuse following the military takeover of the Fort in 1849, and disappeared from records by 1860.

On the opposite bank, the town of Fort Laramie developed (both were later renamed to match the river's eponym). Geographically, the site is situated just east of the steeper foothills terrain to the west (sometimes called "High Plains") that ascends to the east side of the Rocky Mountains proper. This ascent was among the few roadways accessible by the wagons pioneers used to the west. It passed through the continental divide and reached the west slopes of the Rockies along a network of river valleys connecting to the far west via South Pass near the head waters of the North Platte. The strategic site on the eastern plains also had large grazing areas, where migrants could rest their draft animals before tackling the mountains. People could set up camps, do laundry, and heal before beginning anew the rigors of the westward trail.

In 1845, the nearby Fort Bernard was established about 8 miles (13 km) east, farther down the North Platte River, in hopes of getting some of the growing Emigrant Trail trade with western bound wagon trains. This much smaller fort undersold the Laramie operation. It offered a connection south via a crude mule-train road to the Santa Fe Trail via Colorado. Fort Bernard burnt down in 1866, and was never rebuilt. Only a few years later the transcontinental railway joined the two American sea coasts and train travel largely replaced the overland travel along the Emigrant Trails.

=== Frontier army post ===
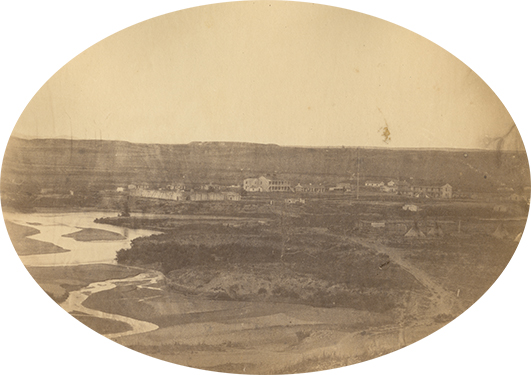
Fort Laramie, 1858. By Samuel C. Mills. This year, gold was discovered at Cherry Creek near Denver, prompting the Colorado gold rush. Even at a distance of more than 200 miles (320 km) from Denver, Fort Laramie became one of these miners' major connections to the world back east.

The fort was purchased from Bruce Husband, a member of the American Fur Company, for $4,000 in June 1849 by US Army Lt. Daniel P. Woodbury on behalf of the United States Government. Three companies of cavalry arrived at the fort that same month, and Company "G" (the 6th Infantry, the post's permanent garrison for many years) arrived on August 12, 1849.

By 1849, gold seekers had joined the Oregon-bound settlers and Mormons heading to Utah, and westward travelers were estimated to number between 20,000 and 40,000 in 1849. The fort itself occupied a location where the westward trail diverged in the direction of either Oregon, Salt Lake City or California. Based on contemporary accounts travelers would remain at the fort several days to mail letters, exchange or purchase cattle, replenish their provisions and reset wagon tires.

The fort was taken over by the Army largely to protect and supply emigrants along the emigrant trails. In 1851, the first Treaty of Fort Laramie was signed, resulting in relatively peaceful relations between the whites and the Native Americans during the 1850s, though troops from the fort made up the small force that was killed during the Grattan massacre of 1854 under the command of Second Lieutenant John Lawrence Grattan. During the increasing strife of the 1860s, the fort took on a more military posture.

Fort Laramie was never seriously threatened by Indian attacks during the quarter-century of intermittent warfare sparked by the Grattan massacre. However, a number of civilians were killed in the immediate area and their property destroyed or stolen during this period of hostilities on the plains. The last known death occurred in March 1877 on the Big Bitter Cottonwood Creek.

The earliest surviving photograph of Fort Laramie, taken in 1858 by Samuel C. Mills, shows the remains of the old adobe walled fur trade fort (Fort John) flanked by a cluster of scattered wood and adobe buildings around the parade grounds.

=== Architecture ===
After Fort Laramie was purchased by the military on June 26, 1849, numerous buildings were constructed in the following years. As construction began many different factors were hindering progress. Amongst these issues included a lack of laborers, the cold winters, lack of water, and a limited supply of wood and stone in the surrounding area. One solution to these issues was the use of adobe bricks in building. Adobe bricks were a cheaper material that could provide needed insulation in the cold climate. Alongside adobe bricks, many buildings are made using concrete and some wood use as well. This use of multiple building materials gives Fort Laramie a unique aesthetic

Built in 1849, Old Bedlam is the oldest known U.S. military structure in Wyoming and Fort Laramie's most commonly noted building. Old Bedlam served as the original officer quarters for Fort Laramie. It was used by officers of various rank and marital status, since no other housing was yet available. Old Bedlam offered very little privacy utilizing public kitchen areas and soldiers often sharing rooms. In 1881 Old Bedlam was turned into a duplex.

Also originally built in 1849 was the Post Traders store. This store provided supplies for all sorts of people including the Army, Native Americans, and pioneers traveling west. Throughout the years the fort was running, numerous additions were added to the Post Traders store and complex. In 1852 the northern section was built from stone, this became the store headquarters. Additions were made again in 1883 to serve as a bar and officers club housing.

The First Hospital in Fort Laramie was built from adobe bricks with a log roof in 1856. It had two rooms with eight beds each. The First Hospital was expanded in 1858 with an additional room, kitchen, dinning, and laundry area. Then in 1871 a new hospital was built in Fort Laramie originally based on a military standardized hospital plan. The first wing of this hospital was completed in 1873–1874 but the original plans were never finished. Porches were added around the building to help with the harsh weather.

Over the years Fort Laramie was operational, several more buildings were built for housing. Firstly, The Captains Quarters were built from 1868–1870. The plans for the Captains Quarters were altered midway through construction, resulting in a duplex with a thin staircase. Next, was the construction of the Cavalry Barracks in 1872–1874. This two story building is the only barracks left at Fort Laramie. The Cavalry Barracks had two large rooms on the second floor, each would hold roughly 60 men. Another quarters, known as the Post Surgeon quarters was finished in 1875 and lived in for the next 15 years by the surgeon and his family. The post surgeon quarters have been reconstructed to resemble the 1880's. Following this was the construction of the Lt. Col. Quarters known as Burt House in 1884. Made with lime grout concrete, Burt House was intended for the Lt. Col. and his family. Burt House is currently restored to 1887–1888 when Lt. Col. Andrew Burt and his family lived there.

Fort Laramie also has two surviving guardhouses. The Old Guardhouse, built in 1866, was the second guardhouse in Fort Laramie. This building usually had guards on duty for 24 hours a day, and could hold up to 40 prisoners in the lower level. The New Guardhouse was built to relieve the Old Guardhouse from overcrowding in 1876.

Many ruins of old structures are present at Fort Laramie Historic Site, with the remaining structures making up only a third of the buildings that were once at Fort Laramie.

=== Civil War, 1861–1865 ===
With the outbreak of the American Civil War in 1861, the troops at Fort Laramie were withdrawn to fight the Confederate States Army in the east. To take their place, a series of volunteer regiments soon arrived at Fort Laramie, including the 11th Ohio Cavalry, serving until they were mustered out in 1866. Between October 1864 and October 1866 at least two companies from various units of "Galvanized Yankees" (Confederate prisoners of war recruited in the Union Army) were stationed at Fort Laramie.

=== Red Cloud's War, 1866–1868 ===
On Christmas night in 1866, John "Portuguese" Phillips ended his historic horseback ride at Fort Laramie after riding 236 miles (380 km) from the Powder River Country. His entire unit had been killed in a fight with the Sioux under Red Cloud, and he had ridden to get reinforcements for Fort Phil Kearny. Legend maintains that Phillips' thoroughbred horse dropped dead upon arriving at the fort; it is unclear whether Phillips kept the same mount for the entire ride. Phillips crossed hostile Indian country, and had to make most of the journey during a brutal Wyoming blizzard.

In the late 1860s, the fort was the primary staging ground for the United States in the Powder River Country during Red Cloud's War. In 1868 the parties reached a peace agreement codified as the second Treaty of Fort Laramie.

=== Great Sioux War of 1876–1877 ===
The discovery of gold in the Black Hills touched off another period of conflict with the Lakota and Northern Cheyenne, as the United States violated their previous promise to keep the hills limited to the Sioux. Miners invaded the territory, and US forces came into conflict during the Great Sioux War of 1876. Fort Laramie served as a major staging point for supplies and troops.

=== Final years ===
After the completion of the transcontinental railroad, the fort's importance gradually decreased. Fewer wagon trains journeyed west, and regional Native Americans had been largely subdued. The fort was decommissioned in 1890. The original abandonment order was issued in 1889, and four of the infantry companies stationed there at that time went to Fort Logan, near Denver, Colorado that fall.

In March 1890, about 30 cavalry soldiers and civilian mechanics under the command of Lt. C. W. Taylor arrived at the fort and removed doors, windows, flooring, and any other material from the buildings that was thought to be of value to the government. The last soldiers left Fort Laramie on April 20, 1890. All but one of the structures were sold at auction to private citizens. The entire military reservation, which was nine miles long and six miles wide, was opened up to homesteaders for settlement on October 5, 1891.

== Historic district ==
The federal government repurchased the site in 1938 and began reconstructing the fort for preservation purposes. The Fort Laramie National Monument was established, which became the Fort Laramie National Historic Site in 1960.

In a 1983 document, the National Park Service (NPS) describes a 536-acre historic district within the larger national historic site containing all of the historic structures, buildings, ruins, and sites, as well as a separate area containing a bridge. The NPS identified 36 significant physical remains that provide the background for the events and the people associated with Fort Laramie. These included 13 standing buildings, 11 standing ruins, and several buildings where only the foundations remain.

== In popular culture ==
=== Radio ===
- In the 1950s, a fictionalized account of life at the fort during the 19th century was depicted in the CBS radio program Fort Laramie.

=== Film and television ===
- In the 1955 movie White Feather, Fort Laramie is at the center of events based on the lives of land surveyor Joshua Tanner and Colonel Lindsay of the 6th U.S. Cavalry.
- The fort is central to a number of chapters in James A. Michener's novel Centennial and the later miniseries.
- The fort is also featured in Taylor Sheridan's fictional depiction of Oregon Trail migration in the TV series 1883, which serves as a prequel to the series Yellowstone.

=== Games ===
- Fort Laramie is one of several stops in The Oregon Trail computer game series.
- Fort Laramie was an ally of Chayton Black in the mission "The Bozeman Trail" in Age of Empires III: The War Chiefs (2006), an expansion pack to Age of Empires III (2005).

== See also ==
- Fort Laramie Three-Mile Hog Ranch, the fort's off-post social center
- List of the oldest buildings in Wyoming
