= Lafayette Township, Coles County, Illinois =

Lafayette Township
- Township
- Location in Coles County

- Coles County's location in Illinois
- Coordinates: 39°29′N 88°18′W
- Country: United States
- State: Illinois
- County: Coles
- Established: November 8, 1859

Area
  - Total: 36.27 sq mi (93.9 km^{2})
  - Land: 36.19 sq mi (93.7 km^{2})
  - Water: 0.08 sq mi (0.21 km^{2}) 0.22%
- Elevation: 705 ft (215 m)

Population (2020)
  - Total: 4,765
  - Density: 131.7/sq mi (50.84/km^{2})
- Time zone: UTC-6 (CST)
  - Summer (DST): UTC-5 (CDT)
- ZIP codes: 61920, 61938, 62440
- FIPS code: 17-029-40637

Lafayette Township is one of twelve townships in Coles County, Illinois, USA. As of the 2020 census, its population was 4,765 and it contained 2,240 housing units. The Coles County Memorial Airport is located in this township.

== Geography ==
According to the 2010 census, the township has a total area of 36.27 square miles (93.9 km^{2}), of which 36.19 square miles (93.7 km^{2}) (or 99.78%) is land and 0.08 square miles (0.21 km^{2}) (or 0.22%) is water.

=== Cities, towns, villages ===
- Charleston (west edge)
- Mattoon (east quarter)

=== Extinct towns ===
- Jones
- Loxa
- Newby
- Rolling Green

=== Cemeteries ===
The township contains three cemeteries: Bethel, Montgomery and Rest Haven Memorial Gardens.

=== Transit ===
- Coles County Zipline

=== Major highways ===
- Interstate 57
- Illinois Route 16

=== Airports and landing strips ===
- Coles County Memorial Airport

== Demographics ==
As of the 2020 census there were 4,765 people, 1,937 households, and 1,178 families residing in the township. The population density was 131.37 inhabitants per square mile (50.72/km^{2}). There were 2,240 housing units at an average density of 61.76 units per square mile (23.85 units/km^{2}). The racial makeup of the township was 90.70% White, 2.64% African American, 0.10% Native American, 1.05% Asian, 0.02% Pacific Islander, 0.78% from other races, and 4.70% from two or more races. Hispanic or Latino of any race were 2.35% of the population.

There were 1,937 households, out of which 27.70% had children under the age of 18 living with them, 50.85% were married couples living together, 6.97% had a female householder with no spouse present, and 39.18% were non-families. 33.20% of all households were made up of individuals, and 18.00% had someone living alone who was 65 years of age or older. The average household size was 2.31 and the average family size was 2.98.

The township's age distribution consisted of 21.7% under the age of 18, 6.4% from 18 to 24, 21.9% from 25 to 44, 26.6% from 45 to 64, and 23.4% who were 65 years of age or older. The median age was 45.0 years. For every 100 females, there were 96.6 males. For every 100 females age 18 and over, there were 93.3 males.

The median income for a household in the township was $51,182, and the median income for a family was $62,875. Males had a median income of $50,868 versus $23,750 for females. The per capita income for the township was $41,775. About 12.6% of families and 18.2% of the population were below the poverty line, including 30.0% of those under age 18 and 11.6% of those age 65 or over.

Historical population
| Census | Pop. | Note | %± |
|---|---|---|---|
| 2010 | 4,822 | | — |
| 2020 | 4,765 | | −1.2% |
U.S. Decennial Census

== School districts ==
- Charleston Community Unit School District 1
- Mattoon Community Unit School District 2

== Political districts ==
- Illinois' 15th congressional district
- State House District 110
- State Senate District 55
