= Ashmore Estates =

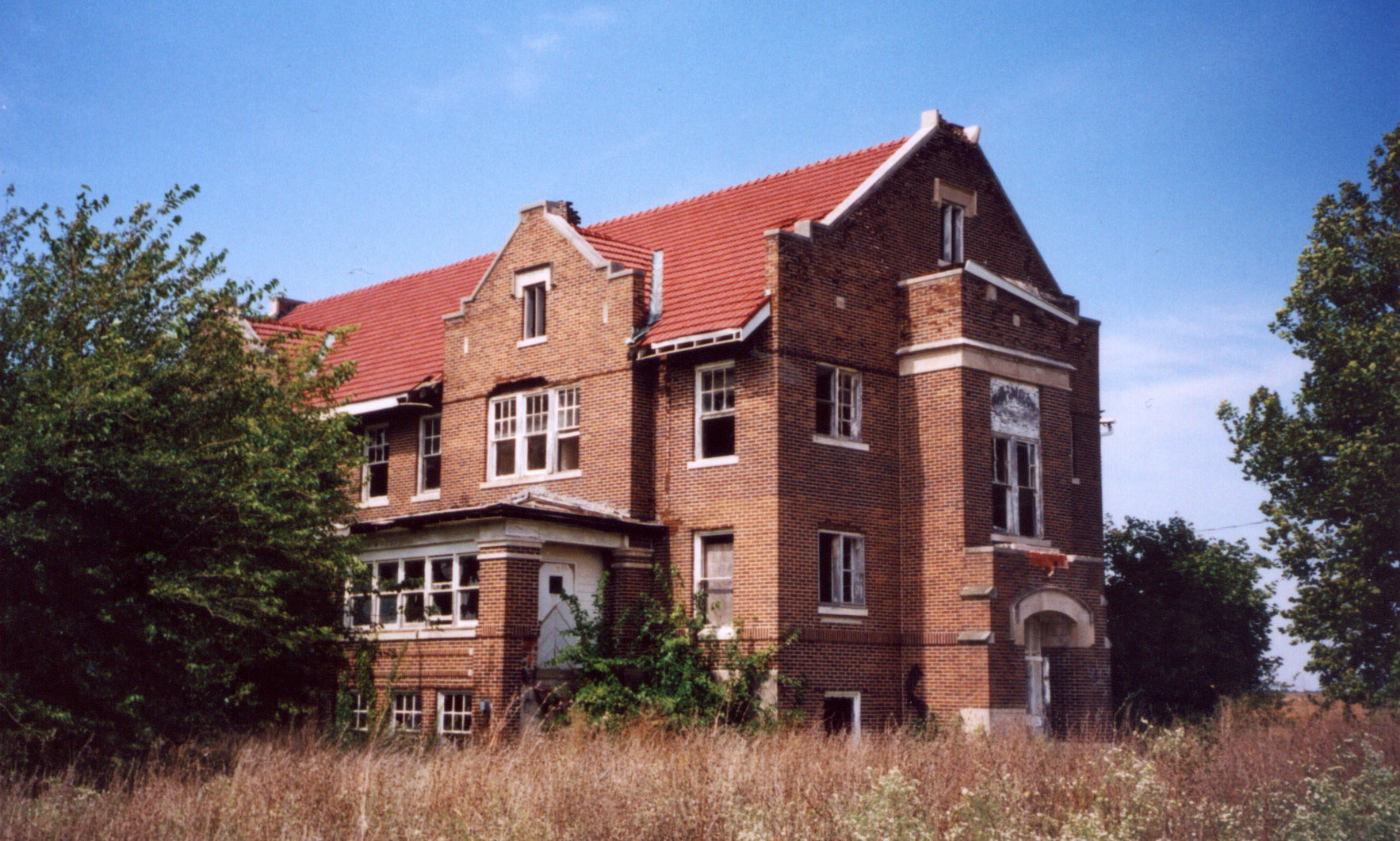
- Ashmore Estates Exterior, c.2002
- Interactive map of the Ashmore Estates area

General information
- Architectural style: Neo-Georgian
- Location: Ashmore, Illinois, United States
- Coordinates: 39.5290°N 88.0498°W
- Construction started: May 17, 1916
- Completed: September 1, 1916
- Cost: $20,389

Design and construction
- Architect: L.F.W. Stuebe
- Engineer: J.W. Montgomery

Ashmore Estates is a historic building outside Ashmore, Illinois, United States. It was built in 1916 as the second almshouse on the property, part of the Coles County Poor Farm. This complex operated until 1959.

That year, the building and related grounds were purchased (and named) by Ashmore Estates, Inc. for use as a private care facility for people with mental and other disabilities. Ashmore Estates closed in 1986 because of financial difficulties in a changing health care environment.

The structure was abandoned and vacant until 2006. Under new ownership, it was adapted and operated as a commercial haunted house. Storm damage in 2013 resulted in another change of ownership. Owners since 2014 have performed basic repairs for structural preservation, and intend to feature it as a historic structure and site for paranormal investigation.

== History ==
=== Coles County Poor Farm ===
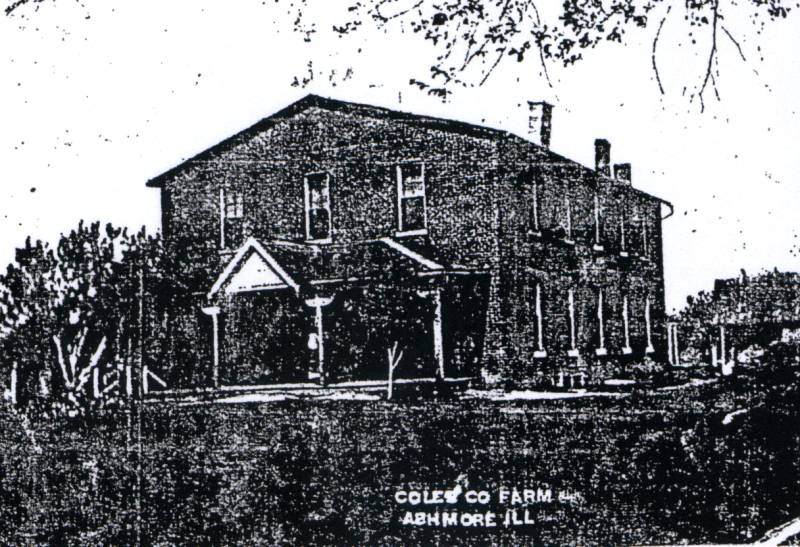
First Coles County Almshouse, c.1890

From 1857 until 1869, the Coles County Poor Farm was located in Charleston Township near the small town of Loxa, Illinois. In 1870, the county purchased 260 acres from A. N. Graham in Section 35 of Ashmore Township for a new farm, which was crossed by the Indianapolis & St. Louis Railroad. A small timber and brick building, constructed by H. B. Truman, was the first on that property. It was 38 x 58 feet and two storeys tall, with an attached kitchen. The initial Superintendent or "Overseer of the Poor" of the county farm was Oliver D. Hawkins, who had migrated in 1841 to Coles County from Kentucky.

As inmates sometimes died at the farm, the county maintained a small cemetery for their burials north of the grounds. In 1879, Joshua Ricketts, superintendent of the county farm, recorded a total of 32 deaths among the estimated 250 inmates who had stayed at the farm between 1870 and 1879. Another pauper cemetery, established a few years later, is visible south of Route 16. It is believed to contain the graves of between 60 and 100 people.

The Board of State Commissioners of Public Charities visited the poor farm in 1902 to assess the facility. "The heating is by stove and is sufficient", they reported. "There is no regular system of ventilation, but plenty of fresh air is easily obtained. There is no plumbing ... There is no fire protection." As for the condition of the mentally ill at the farm, they wrote: "There is no special provision for the insane ... None are locked up or in restraint."

By 1911, however, the Auxiliary Committee of the State Board of Charities condemned the almshouse for its "vermin infected walls", "rough floors", "small windows", and improper ventilation. It was reported that "flies swarmed everywhere" and "were especially noticeable on the poor food prepared for dinner". In January 1915, the Almshouse Committee, headed up by John Goodyear, Ivory W. Merritt Jr., E.N. Carter, W.R. Zimmerman, and William Knollenberg, received bids for the construction of a new "fireproof" building at the location.

The building contract for the new almshouse was awarded to S.C. Sailor of Oakwood, Illinois, but he backed out of the project in late February 1916. The contract was granted to J.W. Montgomery in March for $20,389, and the cornerstone was laid on May 17, 1916. A full-time caretaker and his family were allowed to live in the almshouse or in a white farmhouse that used to be on the property.

Nancy Swinford, the daughter of Leo Roy and Lura Andrews Swinford, lived at the home for eight years during the 1940s and 1950s. In a 2009 interview with the Times-Courier, Swinford said of the Poor Farm:

"It certainly did a lot of people a lot of good. They were warm and had good food on the table. And, they loved working and earning their keep. They weren’t moochers ... They mostly grew their own food, did their own butchering, and smoked the meat. They smoked their own bacon and hams in the smoke house, they killed and dressed all their own chickens, and made their own butter."

=== Ashmore Estates ===
Coles County retained most of the farmland, but sold the almshouse and near property to Ashmore Estates, Inc. in February 1959. That corporation opened the building as a private psychiatric hospital by the same name. In October 1964, after five years in operation, the psychiatric hospital closed down because of debt. The institution re-opened in 1965, but changed its focus from a private facility to one that accepted patients from state mental institutions. These were trying to break up the large asylums of the time. By 1968, the shelter care facility housed 49 residents, including 10 who had epilepsy.

Paul Swinford (no relation to Mary Swinford) and Galen Martinie purchased the institution in July 1976. The two originally envisioned building a new, one-floor residence, to house up to 100 patients, but the state planning committee refused to approve that plan. Swinford and Martinie invested more than $200,000 to construct a modern addition to the old building and upgrade systems throughout. Construction began in 1977, but was not finished until the 1980s.

On December 12, 1981, Barbara Jean Clark became director of the care facility. "We have the opportunity to be one of the best facilities of our kind in the area", she remarked in their eight page in-house organ, The Ashmore Review. It included patients who were developmentally disabled, and training was planned.

In February 1986, Paul Swinford entered into a limited partnership with a Peoria-based company known as Convalescent Management Associates, Inc. to help manage the institution's finances. Because the departments of Public Aid and Public Health did not issue required licenses and certificates for nearly a year, Swinford filed for permission from the Illinois Health Facility Planning Board to close the facility. At that time, Ashmore Estates' financial losses exceeded $1.5 million. By the end of April, all of the residents had been transferred to area homes, and Ashmore Estates closed its doors.

=== Abandonment and controversy ===
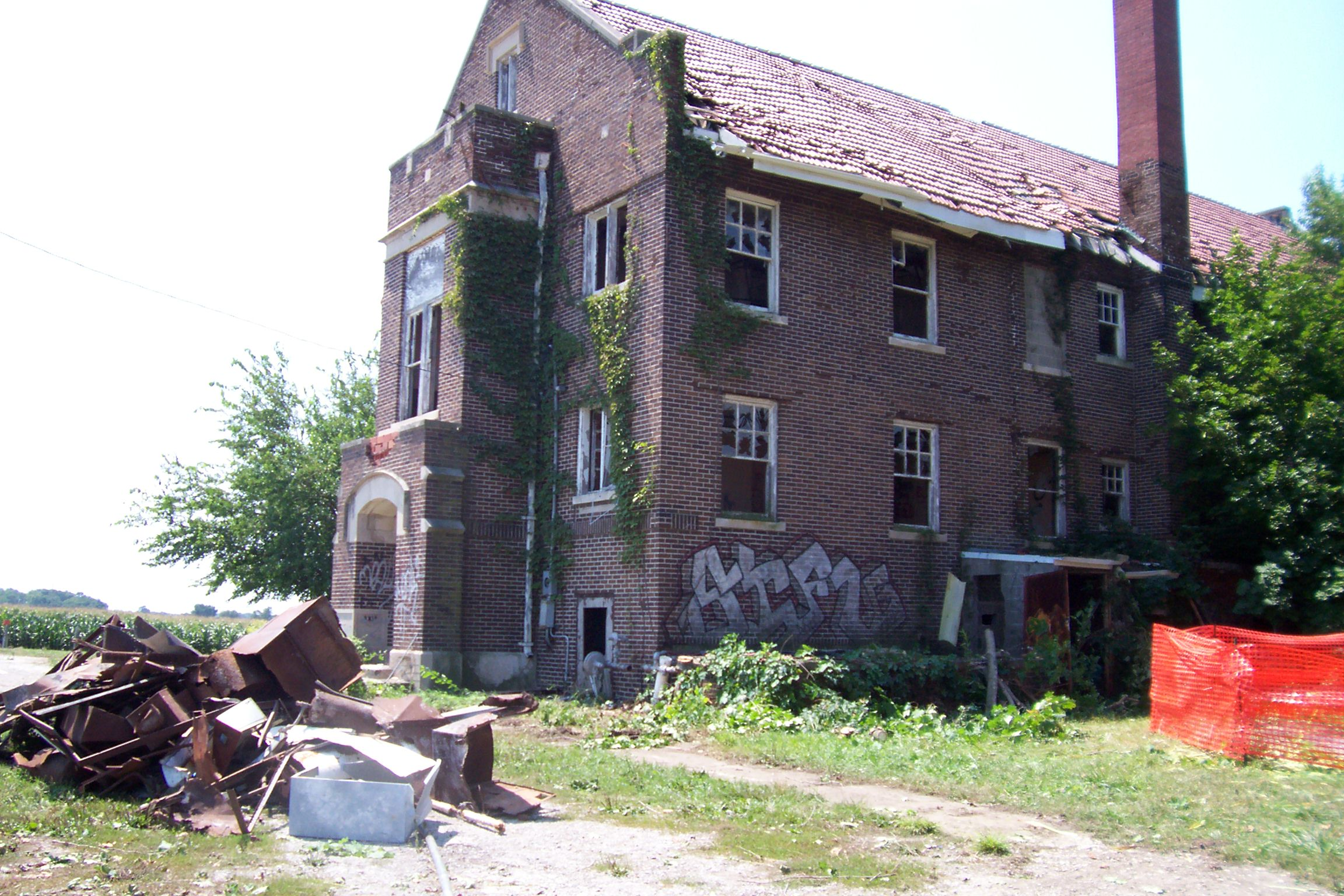
Ashmore Estates, c. 2006

No one attempted to re-open the institution for three years. In 1990, Paul Swinford, with Corrections Corporation of America, based in Tennessee, tried to adapt Ashmore Estates as a mental health facility to treat teenage boys who were in the justice system. On December 18, the Ashmore Village Board unanimously rejected Swinford's request for a zoning permit. They stated concerns related to fire safety of the facility, and public opposition to the proposed use.

On Halloween night in 1995, a fire destroyed an outbuilding that was across the lawn from the front entrance of the main building. This was the site of the former house of the poor farm superintendent. The outbuilding had been used to teach motor skills to the developmentally disabled prior to the facility's closure in 1987.

In 1998, Arthur Colclasure, from Sullivan, paid $12,500 for the property with intentions to renovate the building as his private home. These plans were soon abandoned due to repeated vandalism.

=== Haunted house ===
In August 2006, Scott Kelley and his wife purchased Ashmore Estates from Colclasure and began renovating. According to Kelley: "The building was a wreck ... it took seven weeks of 40 hours a week to clean it out ... the windows were mostly broken." To finance the project, the Kelleys offered flashlight tours of the interior. Locals and self-styled paranormal investigators quickly lined up to get a look inside. To discourage trespassers, they erected signs and moved onto the property.

The Kelleys opened their commercial haunted house on October 13, 2006. In the off-season, Scott offered overnight stays in the building, under a program called a "Night of Insanity". He featured speakers, movies, and guests such as psychic medium Cari Stone from The Cari Stone Show.

=== Storm damage ===
In January 2013, the Ashmore area was hit by a fierce storm, with windspeeds reaching 80 to 100 mph. Ashmore Estates suffered considerable damage; its roof was blown off and the support gables were destroyed. Director Dan Ensign of the Coles County Emergency Management Agency said that the building appeared to be damaged beyond repair. The Kelleys' home, adjacent to the property, escaped largely unscathed.

=== Ownership changes ===
The Kelleys sold the building at auction in April 2013 for a price of $12,700 to Robert Burton & Ella Richards. They sold it in May 2014 for an undisclosed amount to Robbin and Norma Terry, owners of the R Theater in Auburn, Illinois. The Terrys replaced the roof, installed bathrooms, a shower, and a kitchenette, and made many other renovations to the building for safety and structural preservation.

Aided by volunteers, the Terrys intend to preserve the building as a historical structure and a site for paranormal investigation.

== Representation in other media ==
- In 1997 Mike Rice and Matt Fear wrote a satirical piece, published in The Daily Eastern News, on how to make Ashmore Estates into a "highly illegal" Halloween escapade.
- In 2004, Michael Kleen published a collection of short historical fiction called Tales of Coles County, Illinois. One story related to Ashmore Estates; it recounted residents during the Great Depression seeing a ghost of a girl who died in the first almshouse.
- In the summer of 2008, Christopher Saint Booth and Philip Adrian Booth, producers of documentaries such as Spooked (2006) and Children of the Grave (2007), filmed at Ashmore Estates.
- A chapter on the history, folklore, and ghost stories of Ashmore Estates was included in the book Paranormal Illinois (2010).
- In September 2011, Ashmore Estates was featured on the season 5 premiere of Ghost Adventures on the Travel Channel.
- In February 2013, it was investigated by the SyFy's Ghost Hunters on the season 9 episode called "Permanent Residents".
- Ashmore Estates was featured again in season 3 of Ghost Adventures: Aftershocks; the previous and current owners shared new experiences and updates on the building.
- In December 2022, the estate was featured on the season 4 episode of the Travel Channel's Destination Fear.

== Bibliography ==
- Kleen, Michael (2010). Paranormal Illinois. Atglen: Schiffer Books.
- Kleen, Michael (2010). Tales of Coles County, Illinois. Rockford: Black Oak Press, Illinois.
- Perrin, William Henry (1879). The History of Coles County, Illinois. Chicago: W. Le Baron.
