= Lincoln Log Cabin State Historic Site =

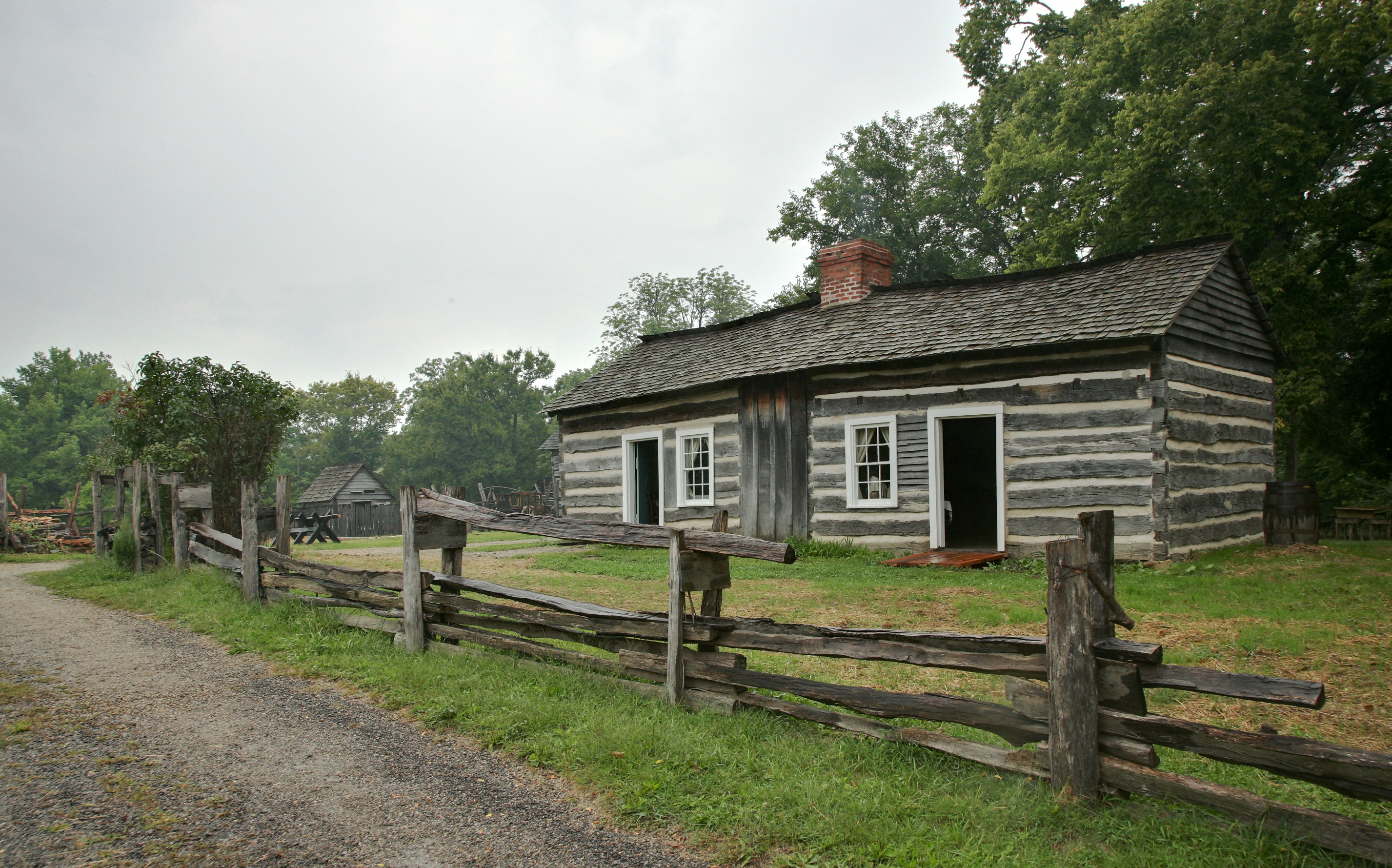
- The reconstructed Lincoln family cabin
- Interactive map showing the location of Lincoln Log Cabin State Historical Site
- Location of Lincoln Log Cabin State Historic Site within Illinois Lincoln Log Cabin State Historic Site (the United States)
- Coordinates: 39°22′50″N 88°12′20″W
- Country: United States
- State: Illinois
- County: Coles
- Time zone: UTC-6 (CST)
  - Summer (DST): UTC-5 (CDT)
- Website: http://www.lincolnlogcabin.org/

The Lincoln Log Cabin State Historic Site is an 86-acre (0.35 km^{2}) history park located eight miles (13 km) south of Charleston, Illinois, U.S., near the town of Lerna. The centerpiece is a replica of the log cabin built and occupied by Thomas Lincoln, father of U.S. President Abraham Lincoln. Abraham Lincoln never lived here and only occasionally visited, but he provided financial help to the household and, after Thomas died in 1851, Abraham owned and maintained the farm for his stepmother, Sarah Bush Lincoln. The farmstead is operated by the Illinois Historic Preservation Agency.

== History ==
Abraham Lincoln's mother, Nancy Hanks Lincoln, died in 1818 while the family lived in a log cabin in the Little Pigeon Creek Community in southern Indiana. In 1819, Lincoln's father Thomas Lincoln married the widowed Sarah Johnston of Elizabethtown, Kentucky. In 1830, Thomas and Sarah followed their daughter and son-in-law and other family members as they migrated west from Indiana into Central Illinois; Abraham, though now a legal adult, opted to follow his step-mother and father.

After a wretched winter in 1830–1831 at a campsite west of Decatur, young Abraham left the family to start his own homestead and seek his fortune in Sangamon County. Wandering generally southeastward, Thomas and Sarah eventually settled in Coles County. After living unsuccessfully on three separate farmsteads within the county, Thomas bought a small plot near the Embarras River in 1840, part of what was then called Goosenest Prairie, now within Pleasant Grove Township on the southern edge of Coles County.

At some point soon after that purchase, Thomas and Sarah built what was to be their final home, a saddlebag style log cabin with two main rooms and additional sleeping and storage space in a loft or attic accessed by a ladder. By 1845, the cabin was home to as many as 18 members of the Lincoln and Johnston families, living together in an extended-family arrangement common in Appalachian Southern culture. Abraham Lincoln, now a rising state legislator and lawyer, provided financial help to his parents but did not visit them as often as he could. As a lawyer, he was in Charleston, site of the Coles County courthouse, quite frequently, but only visited "every year or two." Though he remembered his stepmother fondly, Lincoln was not very close to his father; he did not visit even when Thomas Lincoln was terminally ill in 1851.

At the end of January 1861, Abraham Lincoln, the president-elect, traveled by newly laid railroad tracks from Springfield to Farmington, a few miles north of the cabin, to visit his widowed stepmother (Farmington is now the unincorporated hamlet of Campbell, Illinois and not to be confused with Farmington, Illinois). Their meeting occurred at the middle-class frame house of prominent Farmington citizen (Sarah's son-in-law and Abraham's step-brother-in-law) Reuben Moore. They also visited Thomas Lincoln's grave at nearby Shiloh Cemetery. Sarah was fond of her stepson and had always believed he would be successful. This was to be their last visit; Lincoln never returned to Illinois alive.

Sarah Bush Lincoln lived in the Goosenest Prairie cabin until her death in 1869. Sarah Lincoln was buried with Thomas in Shiloh Cemetery.

== The site today ==
In 1893, the original Thomas Lincoln log cabin was disassembled and shipped northward to serve as an exhibit at the World's Columbian Exposition in Chicago, Illinois. The original cabin was lost after the Exposition, and may have been used as firewood. However, the cabin had been photographed many times, and an exact replica was built from the photographs and from contemporary descriptions.

In 1907, Margaret Olivia Slocum Sage purchased the cabin for $25,000 ($740,000 in 2021) and intended to place it in a glass case to be preserved forever.

Stephen Sargent home at Lincoln Log Cabin State Historic Site

The current Lincoln Log Cabin State Historic Site includes three houses on two sites:

- A reconstruction of the Thomas Lincoln log cabin, completed in 1934 as a project of the Civilian Conservation Corps. It is surrounded by a subsistence farmstead similar to the senior Lincoln's actual farm, is the central feature of the main site. The farm includes heirloom crops and cattle breeds similar or identical to those used at the time.
- The Stephen Sargent home, built on a site 10 miles to the east starting in 1843 and moved to Lincoln Log Cabin in 1987, reflects successful cash crop farming practices of the 1840s, and is meant to contrast with the Lincoln farm.
- The Reuben Moore Home, occupied by a branch of the family starting in 1856, was the place of Abraham and Sarah Bush Lincoln's final meeting. It is located about 1 mile (1.6 km) north of the main Goosenest Prairie site in what is now the former village of Farmington.

The Lincoln Log Cabin State Historic Site is interpreted to the mid-1840s, the time of its occupation by many members of the extended Lincoln family. The main site also includes the cornfields, gardens, small orchards, livestock, and outbuildings that would be found on a farm of the period. The crops and livestock are all of historic heirloom varieties. A great many additional activities occur during the annual Fall Harvest Frolic.

In response to budget cuts, the state of Illinois temporarily closed the Lincoln Log Cabin State Historic Site from December 2008 until April 2009. On January 22, 2014, part of the site was listed on the National Register of Historic Places. The former location of the CCC's "Camp Shiloh", it qualified as a historical archaeological site, not because of the current buildings or because of any connection to Lincoln. As a result, all the buildings on the site are non-contributing.

== See also ==
- Lincoln logs, children's toy
