= Hitesville, Illinois =

Hitesville
- Ghost town
- Interactive map of Hitesville
- Coordinates: 39°30′1″N 88°2′38″W
- Country: United States
- State: Illinois
- County: Coles
- Township: Ashmore
- Elevation: 697 ft (212 m)
- ZIP code: 61912

Hitesville, Illinois is a ghost town in Coles County, Illinois. It was abandoned in 1879.

== History ==
In 1835, James Hite, an immigrant from Kentucky who moved to Coles County in 1831, created a village named after himself. A stone marker in the area, however, says it was established in 1837. During its peak, there were many homes and several markets, but about 10–15 years later, the town was forgotten and many people left. James Hite planted a Presbyterian church, which the preacher was Rev. John Steele, and was in use until James Hite moved. Many of the members, mainly from the St. Omer area, left to attend a new church in Ashmore.

== Geography ==
Hitesville was located at 39°30′1″N 88°2′38″W (39.300186, -88.023851)
