= North Okaw Township, Coles County, Illinois =

North Okaw Township
- Township
- Location in Coles County

- Coles County's location in Illinois
- Coordinates: 39°35′N 88°25′W
- Country: United States
- State: Illinois
- County: Coles
- Established: November 8, 1859

Area
  - Total: 54.41 sq mi (140.9 km^{2})
  - Land: 54.37 sq mi (140.8 km^{2})
  - Water: 0.04 sq mi (0.10 km^{2}) 0.07%
- Elevation: 653 ft (199 m)

Population (2020)
  - Total: 1,004
  - Density: 18.47/sq mi (7.130/km^{2})
- Time zone: UTC-6 (CST)
  - Summer (DST): UTC-5 (CDT)
- ZIP codes: 61910, 61911, 61931, 61938, 61951
- FIPS code: 17-029-54014

North Okaw Township is one of twelve townships in Coles County, Illinois, United States. As of the 2020 census, its population was 1,004 and it contained 366 housing units. The Kaskaskia River flows through the township. The Cook Mills Consolidated oil field is within this township. The township changed its name from Okaw Township on May 7, 1860.

== Geography ==
According to the 2010 census, the township has a total area of 54.41 square miles (140.9 km^{2}), of which 54.37 square miles (140.8 km^{2}) (or 99.93%) is land and 0.04 square miles (0.10 km^{2}) (or 0.07%) is water.

=== Unincorporated towns ===
- Cooks Mills

(This list is based on USGS data and may include former settlements.)

=== Cemeteries ===
The township contains five cemeteries: Brann, Mount Zion, Pleasant Grove, Smith and Zoar.

=== Major highways ===
- US Route 45
- Illinois Route 121

== Demographics ==
As of the 2020 census there were 1,004 people, 447 households, and 357 families residing in the township. The population density was 18.45 inhabitants per square mile (7.12/km^{2}). There were 366 housing units at an average density of 6.72 units per square mile (2.59 units/km^{2}). The racial makeup of the township was 97.01% White, 0.20% African American, 0.20% Native American, 0.10% Asian, 0.00% Pacific Islander, 0.10% from other races, and 2.39% from two or more races. Hispanic or Latino of any race were 0.80% of the population.

There were 447 households, out of which 41.20% had children under the age of 18 living with them, 74.72% were married couples living together, 5.15% had a female householder with no spouse present, and 20.13% were non-families. 20.10% of all households were made up of individuals, and 15.40% had someone living alone who was 65 years of age or older. The average household size was 3.30 and the average family size was 3.83.

The township's age distribution consisted of 25.7% under the age of 18, 11.9% from 18 to 24, 19.2% from 25 to 44, 23% from 45 to 64, and 20.2% who were 65 years of age or older. The median age was 35.9 years. For every 100 females, there were 69.3 males. For every 100 females age 18 and over, there were 59.9 males.

The median income for a household in the township was $64,375, and the median income for a family was $64,514. Males had a median income of $49,960 versus $38,587 for females. The per capita income for the township was $24,113. About 29.4% of families and 27.4% of the population were below the poverty line, including 35.1% of those under age 18 and 30.3% of those age 65 or over.

Historical population
Census	Pop.	Note	%±
2010	983		—
2020	1,004		2.1%
U.S. Decennial Census

== School districts ==
- Arcola Consolidated Unit School District 306
- Arthur Community Unit School District 305
- Mattoon Community Unit School District 2
- Sullivan Community Unit School District 300

== Political districts ==
- Illinois' 15th congressional district
- State House District 110
- State Senate District 55
