= Coles County Memorial Airport =

Airport in Illinois, U.S.

- IATA: MTO; ICAO: KMTO; FAA LID: MTO

Summary
- Airport type: Public
- Owner: Coles County Airport Authority
- Serves: Mattoon / Charleston, Illinois
- Time zone: UTC−06:00 (−6)
  - Summer (DST): UTC−05:00 (−5)
- Elevation AMSL: 722 ft (220 m)
- Coordinates: 39°28′41″N 88°16′45″W
- Website: ColesCountyAirport.com

Map
- Location in Illinois MTO (the United States)

Runways
Direction	Length		Surface
Direction	ft	m	Surface
11/29	6,501	1,982	Concrete
6/24	5,799	1,768	Asphalt
18/36	1,080	329	Turf

Statistics (2020)
- Aircraft operations: 27,000
- Based aircraft: 51
- Source: Federal Aviation Administration

Coles County Memorial Airport (IATA: MTO, ICAO: KMTO, FAA LID: MTO) is a public-use airport located between Mattoon and Charleston in Coles County, Illinois. It is owned by the Coles County Airport Authority. The airport lies approximately five miles east of Mattoon and six miles west of Charleston. It is categorized as a general aviation facility in the Federal Aviation Administration’s National Plan of Integrated Airport Systems (NPIAS) for 2011–2015.

The airport hosts an annual air show featuring aerial performances, static displays, helicopter rides, and monster truck attractions. While the event is free to attend, donations are encouraged.

Coles County Memorial Airport also has a strong partnership with the Civil Air Patrol and supports youth aviation programs through its affiliation with the Johnson Flight Academy.

== History ==
Scheduled commercial airline service at Coles County Memorial Airport began in 1955 with Ozark Air Lines, which operated Douglas DC-3 aircraft. Ozark ceased service in 1980. American Eagle later provided flights to Chicago O'Hare International Airport until 1991, while Midway Connection also offered service to Chicago Midway International Airport.

Commercial airline service ended in 2000 when Great Lakes Airlines, operating under the United Express brand, discontinued its flights to Chicago O’Hare via the Purdue University Airport in West Lafayette, Indiana.

In 2023, the airport received the Frank G. Brewer Memorial Aerospace Award, presented by the Civil Air Patrol for its outstanding contributions to youth education and development in aerospace activities.

== Facilities ==
The airport covers 1,225 acres (496 ha) at an elevation of 722 feet (220 m) and has three runways. Runway 11/29 measures 6,501 by 150 feet (1,982 × 46 m), is paved with grooved concrete, and features an instrument landing system (ILS) approach. Runway 6/24 measures 5,799 by 100 feet (1,768 × 30 m) and is surfaced with asphalt. Runway 18/36 measures 1,080 by 250 feet (329 × 76 m) and has a sod surface.

The main runway, originally constructed in 1974, underwent a complete reconstruction in 2015. During this period, the runway was closed for nearly three months, preventing most fixed-wing aircraft operations. However, helicopters and agricultural aircraft continued to utilize the airport.

Additional facilities at the airport include:

- VOR/DME (Identifier: MTO) on 109.40 MHz, with automated weather information available via VOR
- A fixed-base operator (FBO): Coles County Aviation
- The Airport Steakhouse Restaurant

For the 12-month period ending December 31, 2022, the airport recorded 1,500 aircraft operations, averaging approximately four operations per day. Operations comprised 89% general aviation, 9% air taxi, and 2% military. During the same period, 31 aircraft were based at the airport: 25 single-engine airplanes, 3 helicopters, 2 jets, and 1 multi-engine airplane.

== Ground transportation ==
Although there is no direct public transit service to the airport, the Coles County Zipline provides transportation to nearby areas.

== Accidents and incidents ==
- On June 18, 2003, an Ercoupe 415-C that departed from Coles County Memorial Airport made an off-airport landing while en route to Cooch Landing Area Airport in Atwood, Illinois. The probable cause was determined to be the pilot's selection of an unsuitable landing site and the improper decision to continue the approach without having the airport and runway clearly in sight.
- On April 19, 2025, a Cessna 180 Skywagon struck power lines and crashed into a field southwest of the airport near Trilla, Illinois, resulting in the deaths of all four occupants on board.

== See also ==
- List of airports in Illinois
- Mattoon station
