= Seven Hickory Township, Coles County, Illinois =

Seven Hickory Township
- Township
- Location in Coles County

- Coles County's location in Illinois
- Coordinates: 39°35′N 88°12′W
- Country: United States
- State: Illinois
- County: Coles
- Established: November 8, 1859

Area
  - Total: 52.07 sq mi (134.9 km^{2})
  - Land: 52.07 sq mi (134.9 km^{2})
  - Water: 0 sq mi (0 km^{2}) 0%
- Elevation: 679 ft (207 m)

Population (2020)
  - Total: 312
  - Density: 5.99/sq mi (2.31/km^{2})
- Time zone: UTC-6 (CST)
  - Summer (DST): UTC-5 (CDT)
- ZIP codes: 61910, 61920, 61930
- FIPS code: 17-029-68718

Seven Hickory Township is one of twelve townships in Coles County, Illinois, USA. As of the 2020 census, its population was 312 and it contained 120 housing units. The township's name changed from Hickory Township on May 7, 1860.

== Geography ==
According to the 2010 census, the township has a total area of 52.07 square miles (134.9 km^{2}), all land.

=== Cities, towns, villages ===
- Charleston (north edge)

=== Unincorporated towns ===
- Fairgrange

=== Major highways ===
- Illinois Route 130

== Demographics ==
As of the 2020 census there were 312 people, 65 households, and 56 families residing in the township. The population density was 5.99 inhabitants per square mile (2.31/km^{2}). There were 120 housing units at an average density of 2.31 units per square mile (0.89 units/km^{2}). The racial makeup of the township was 96.79% White, 0.32% African American, 0.00% Native American, 0.00% Asian, 0.00% Pacific Islander, 0.00% from other races, and 2.88% from two or more races. Hispanic or Latino of any race were 0.32% of the population.

There were 65 households, out of which 72.30% had children under the age of 18 living with them, 86.15% were married couples living together, 0.00% had a female householder with no spouse present, and 13.85% were non-families. 13.80% of all households were made up of individuals, and none had someone living alone who was 65 years of age or older. The average household size was 3.11 and the average family size was 3.45.

The township's age distribution consisted of 30.7% under the age of 18, 9.9% from 18 to 24, 37.1% from 25 to 44, 22.3% from 45 to 64, and none who were 65 years of age or older. The median age was 28.6 years. For every 100 females, there were 119.6 males. For every 100 females age 18 and over, there were 154.5 males.

The median income for a household in the township was $102,422, and the median income for a family was $101,719. Males had a median income of $48,235 versus $23,250 for females. The per capita income for the township was $46,216. None of the population was below the poverty line.

Historical population
Census	Pop.	Note	%±
2010	286		—
2020	312		9.1%
U.S. Decennial Census

== School districts ==
- Arcola Consolidated Unit School District 306
- Charleston Community Unit School District 1
- Oakland Community Unit School District 5

== Political districts ==
- Illinois's 15th congressional district
- State House District 110
- State Senate District 55
