= Charleston High School (Illinois) =

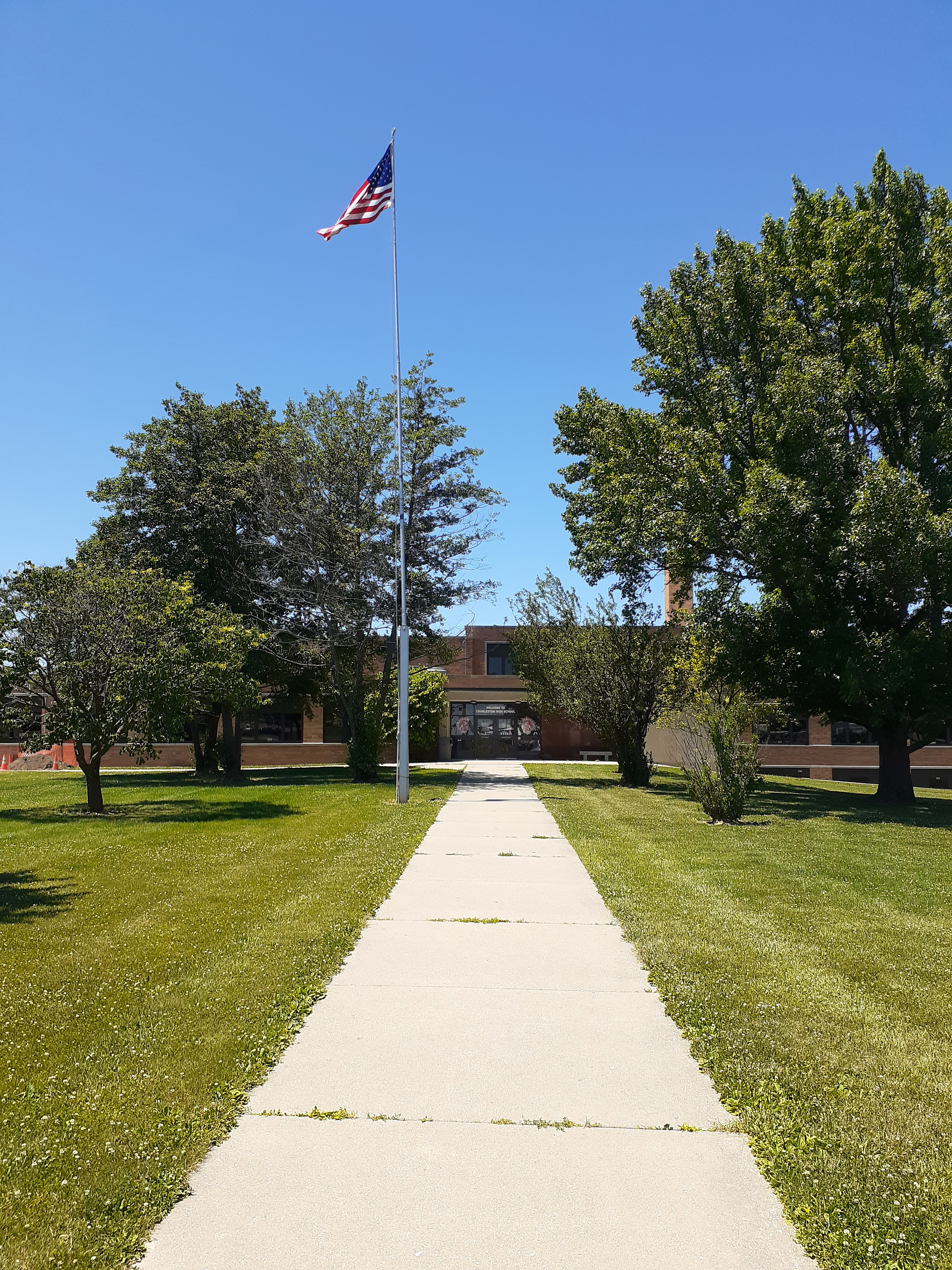

Location
- 1615 Lincoln Ave; Charleston, Coles, Illinois 61920; United States
- 39.485341°N 88.164520°W

Information
- Type: Public
- School district: Charleston Community Unit School District 1
- Principal: Aaron Lock
- Teaching staff: 47.00 (FTE)
- Grades: 9-12
- Enrollment: 780 (2023–2024)
- Student to teacher ratio: 16.60
- Colors: Scarlet; Gold
- Athletics: IHSA
- Athletics conference: Apollo Conference
- Team name: Trojans
- Rival: Mattoon High School (Coles County Clash)
- Newspaper: CHS Press
- Yearbook: Recorder
- Website: www.charleston.k12.il.us/o/chs

Charleston High School is a public high school in Charleston, Illinois, United States.

== History ==
It is among the few public high schools in Illinois to receive a distinguished GreatSchools Rating of 8 out of 10. Charleston High School serves grades 9–12 in the Charleston CUSD 1 district. The AP participation rate at Charleston High School is 12 percent. The student body makeup is 51 percent male and 49 percent female, and the total minority enrollment is 6 percent. The total enrollment from the year 2011 was 809. There are also 50 full-time teachers on the staff of Charleston High School. The student teacher ratio is 16:1. They are rated from 0 (worst) to 100 (best) at 84. They did not meet the education standards for 2011. Charleston High School offers AP courses in nine subjects. They meet the immunization protection levels required by the state. 61.3% of students met PSAE standards in the year 2011. Charleston High School follows Illinois and Charleston CUSD 1 District guidelines. The community rating for this school is four out of five stars. At Charleston High School in Spring 2010, 33.7% of juniors scored high enough on at least three of the four parts of the ACT to be considered “college-ready” for key freshman classes.

== Athletics ==
Charleston's High School athletics participate in the Apollo Conference and are members of the Illinois High School Association.

=== Boys ===
- Baseball
- Basketball
- Cross Country
- Football
- Golf
- Soccer
- Swimming & Diving
- Tennis
- Track & Field
- Wrestling

=== Girls ===
- Basketball
- Cross Country
- Cheerleading
- Dance
- Golf
- Softball
- Soccer
- Swimming & Diving
- Tennis
- Track & Field
- Volleyball

=== Notable team state finishes ===
- Boys Golf: 2017-18 & 2018-19 (1st)
- Drama: 1990-91 (2nd), 1993-94 & 2002-03 & 2004-05 (3rd)
- Girls Golf: 2015-16 (3rd), 2016-17 (1st)
- Group Interpretation: 2001-02 (2nd)

== Extracurricular activities ==
- American Field Service
- C Club
- High School Press
- Chess Club
- FCCLA
- Flag Corps
- Freedom Writers Club
- French Club
- French National Honor Day Society
- Future Business Leaders of America
- FFA
- Interact Club
- National Honor Society
- Performing Music Ensembles
- Recorder Club
- Scholastic Bowl
- Spanish Club
- Spanish National Honor Society
- Speech and Drama Team
- Student Council
- Trojan News
- Visual Art Club

== Notable alumni ==
- Marty Pattin, former Major League Baseball pitcher (California Angels, Seattle Pilots, Milwaukee Brewers, Boston Red Sox, Kansas City Royals)
- Jeff Gossett, former NFL punter (Los Angeles/Oakland Raiders)
- Ben Hess, baseball player
- Ray Fisher, former NFL player
- Rex Morgan, former NBA player
- Stan Royer, former MLB player (St. Louis Cardinals, Boston Red Sox)
