= Humboldt, Illinois =

Humboldt
- Village
- Motto: "small town with a big heart"
- Location of Humboldt in Coles County, Illinois.
- Coordinates: 39°36′17″N 88°19′12″W
- Country: United States
- State: Illinois
- County: Coles
- Township: Humboldt
- Incorporated: April 16, 1878

Area
  - Total: 0.34 sq mi (0.89 km^{2})
  - Land: 0.34 sq mi (0.89 km^{2})
  - Water: 0 sq mi (0.00 km^{2})
- Elevation: 659 ft (201 m)

Population (2020)
  - Total: 361
  - Density: 1,051.2/sq mi (405.87/km^{2})
- Time zone: UTC-6 (CST)
  - Summer (DST): UTC-5 (CDT)
- ZIP code: 61931
- Area code: 217
- FIPS code: 17-36542
- GNIS ID: 2398559

Humboldt is a village in Coles County, Illinois, United States. At the 2020 census, its population was 361. It is part of the Charleston-Mattoon Micropolitan Statistical Area.

== History ==
The village was incorporated on April 16, 1878. The village was named after Alexander von Humboldt, a German natural scientist.

== Geography ==
According to the 2021 census gazetteer files, Humboldt has a total area of 0.34 square miles (0.88 km^{2}), all land.

== Demographics ==
Historical population
Census	Pop.	Note	%±
1880	237		—
1890	279		17.7%
1900	319		14.3%
1910	356		11.6%
1920	343		−3.7%
1930	319		−7.0%
1940	334		4.7%
1950	295		−11.7%
1960	342		15.9%
1970	366		7.0%
1980	499		36.3%
1990	470		−5.8%
2000	481		2.3%
2010	437		−9.1%
2020	361		−17.4%
U.S. Decennial Census

As of the 2020 census there were 361 people, 185 households, and 112 families residing in the village. The population density was 1,052.48 inhabitants per square mile (406.36/km^{2}). There were 189 housing units at an average density of 551.02 per square mile (212.75/km^{2}). The racial makeup of the village was 87.53% White, 1.39% African American, 0.28% Native American, 6.65% from other races, and 4.16% from two or more races. Hispanic or Latino of any race were 11.08% of the population.

There were 185 households, out of which 37.3% had children under the age of 18 living with them, 45.41% were married couples living together, 12.97% had a female householder with no husband present, and 39.46% were non-families. 31.89% of all households were made up of individuals, and 14.59% had someone living alone who was 65 years of age or older. The average household size was 3.11 and the average family size was 2.41.

The village's age distribution consisted of 27.1% under the age of 18, 7.6% from 18 to 24, 22.4% from 25 to 44, 30.3% from 45 to 64, and 12.6% who were 65 years of age or older. The median age was 41.3 years. For every 100 females, there were 98.2 males. For every 100 females age 18 and over, there were 94.6 males.

The median income for a household in the village was $39,875, and the median income for a family was $63,750. Males had a median income of $36,705 versus $26,875 for females. The per capita income for the village was $22,972. About 9.8% of families and 12.7% of the population were below the poverty line, including 11.3% of those under age 18 and 3.6% of those age 65 or over.

== Transportation ==
Coles County Zipline provides dial-a-ride bus transit service to the city. The nearest passenger rail service is at Mattoon station, where Amtrak operates to Chicago, Carbondale, New Orleans, and other destinations.

== Education ==
It is in the Mattoon Community Unit School District 2. The district's comprehensive high school is Mattoon High School.
