= Campbell, Illinois =

- Unincorporated community
- Reuben Moore historic home at Campbell, Illinois

- Campbell is located in Pleasant Grove Township, Coles County, Illinois.
- Coordinates: 39°23′45″N 88°12′40″W
- Country: United States
- State: Illinois
- County: Coles
- Township: Pleasant Grove
- Elevation: 702 ft (214 m)
- Time zone: UTC-6 (Central (CST))
  - Summer (DST): UTC-5 (CDT)
- Area code: 217
- GNIS feature ID: 408289

Campbell is an unincorporated community in southern Coles County, Illinois, United States. Campbell is 7 miles (11 km) south-southwest of Charleston. The Embarras River and Fox Ridge State Park are approximately three miles to the east and the Lincoln Log Cabin State Historic Site is one mile south.

== History ==
A Moore House marker erected by the Illinois State Historical Society in 1955 reads as follows.

Here on January 31, 1861, President-elect Abraham Lincoln visited his stepmother, Mrs. Sarah Bush Lincoln and her daughter Mrs. Reuben Moore (Matilda Johnston). This was his last visit to Coles County before leaving Illinois for his inauguration. Mrs. Lincoln returned with him to Charleston that night and their farewells were said the next morning.
