= Kleen =

Kleen is a German, Dutch, and Swedish surname literally meaning "small". Notable people with the surname include:

- Algot Kleen (born 2002), Swedish professional golfer
- Andrea Gram (1853–1927), Norwegian artist
- Bengt af Kleen, Swedish male curler
- Else Kleen (1882–1968), Swedish journalist
- Emil Kléen (1868–1898), Swedish journalist and poet
- Frithjof Kleen (born 1983), German sailor
- Michael Kleen, American folklorist and politician
- Tyra Kleen (1974-1951), Swedish artist and author
