= Cooks Mills =

Cooks Mills may refer to:

- Cooks Mills, Illinois, United States
- Cooks Mills, New Jersey, United States
- Cooks Mills, Welland, Ontario, Canada
- Cooks Mills, Nipissing District, Ontario, Canada
- Spragge, Ontario, Canada, formerly known as Cook's Mills
- Battle of Cook's Mills, a battle in Ontario, Canada between American and British forces during the War of 1812.
