= Mattoon High School =

Coordinates: 39.4746°N 88.38672°W

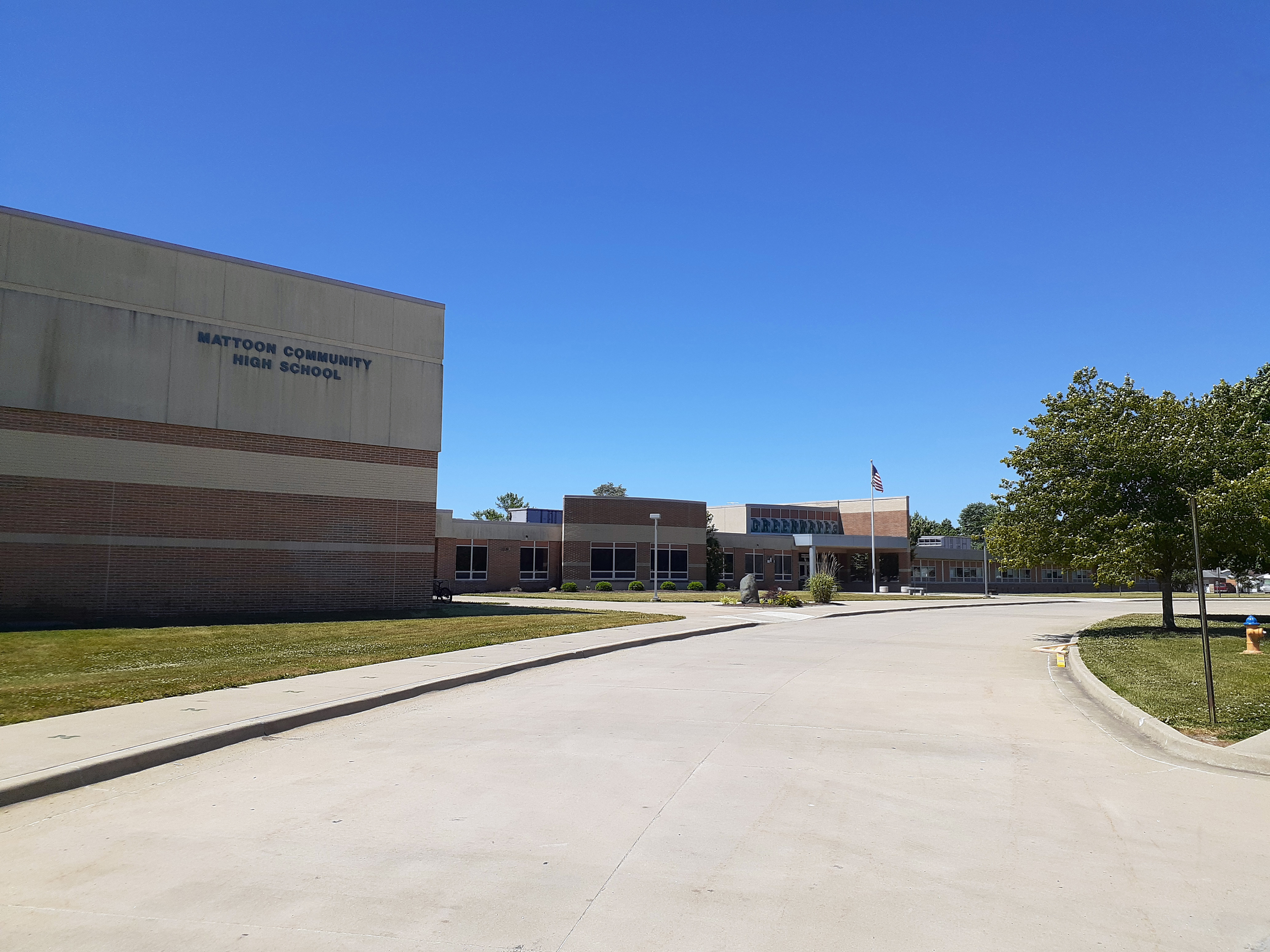

Location
- 2521 Walnut Ave. Mattoon, Coles, Illinois 61938; United States

Information
- Type: Public
- School district: Mattoon Community Unit School District 2
- Principal: Richard Stuart
- Teaching staff: 56.30 (FTE)
- Grades: 9-12
- Enrollment: 952 (2023–2024)
- Student to teacher ratio: 16.91
- Colors: Green; Gold
- Athletics: IHSA
- Athletics conference: Apollo Conference
- Team name: Green Wave
- Rival: Charleston High School (Coles County Clash)
- Yearbook: Riddle
- Website: www.mattoon.k12.il.us

Mattoon High School is located in Mattoon, Illinois, United States. It is a part of the Mattoon Community Unit School District 2.

In addition to Mattoon, the district (of which this is the sole comprehensive high school) includes Humboldt and Trilla.

== History ==
The original Mattoon High School, famous for its fish-shaped fountain, was relocated in 1956; the fish fountain, which symbolizes the past and future of the district's students, was moved to the new high school in 2005 during renovations.

The school mascot is the Mattoon Greenwave.

There are two stories behind the Greenwave nickname:

The first being that the nickname comes from the surrounding corn fields blowing in the wind. The school colors are also based on the same farming tradition within the community with the green and "vegas" or "old" gold coming from the stalk and tassel from the corn fields."

The second story for why they are the "Greenwave" is because supposedly the Tulane Green Wave (New Orleans) stopped in Mattoon at the train station on their way to play a football game in Chicago back in the mid 1930s. As the story goes, the MHS football team met them and in honor of that event, the school named the local team after them.

Prior to the mid 1930s, Mattoon High School was commonly known as "Mattoon" or the "Green and Gold".

== Academics ==
At MHS, staff and students partner to achieve high-quality results. Desired outcomes are aligned to state standards and articulated by subject area and grade level. Their instructional model balances whole- and small-group approaches, as well as individual conferencing.

Teachers incorporate student strengths and interests and build strong relationships in their classroom communities, while leveraging the transformational power of technology to prepare students for their futures.

The district also takes a hands-on approach to learning. One of their newest implementations has been the CTE programs offered at Mattoon High School. Explore the diverse courses available at MHS, including Agriculture, Food Science, Veterinary Science, Floral Design & Greenhouse, Welding, Child Development, Building Trades, and Visual Design. These courses offer a variety of dual credits through Lake Land College.

MCUSD2 also focuses on developing leadership skills at a young age. By partnering with Leader in Me, grades PK-12 have the opportunity to develop and hone their leadership skills. All six schools in the district are certified as a Leader in Me Lighthouse school by FranklinCovey Education. This recognition is evidence that the district has produced outstanding results in schools and student outcomes.

== Athletics ==
The Greenwave currently compete in the Apollo Conference, moving there from the Big Twelve Conference in 2012. The change now pits them against teams more locally based than before, with the conference consisting of the Charleston Trojans, Effingham Flaming Hearts, Mahomet-Seymour Bulldogs, Mt. Zion Braves, and the Taylorville Tornadoes.

=== Available Sports ===
- Baseball
- Basketball
- Cheerleading
- Cross Country
- Dance
- Football
- Golf
- Soccer
- Softball
- Tennis
- Track & Field
- Volleyball
- Wrestling

Notable Team State Finishes (IHSA)

- Baseball: 1996 (4th) 1970
- Girls Basketball: 1978 (4th)
- Softball: 2007 (2nd), 2011 (4th)

State Finals Qualifications (IHSA)

- Boys Basketball 1968-69 Sweet Sixteen one class not broken into classes by student population
- Baseball: 1973, 1996
- Boys Cross Country: 1969–80, 2010, 2015
- Football: 1974, 1990–92, 1999, 2003, 2007
- Boys Golf: 1937, 1940, 1970, 1974, 1998, 2014, 2016
- Boys Soccer: 2003
- Dance: 2013-2018, 21-22, 24
- Girls Basketball: 1977–79, 1988
- Girls Cross Country: 2010-13
- Girls Golf: 1975–83, 1985, 1987, 1989, 1993
- Softball: 2007, 2011
- Wrestling 2020

Apollo Conference All Sport Championships

- 2012, 2013, 2014, 2015, 2016

== Extracurricular activities ==
Mattoon High School offers a host of extracurricular activities available to grades 9-12. From sports and student leadership organizations to band, JROTC, scholastic bowl, and Team Massive, MHS offers over 50 opportunities for students to participate in sports, clubs, and other extracurricular activities.

== Notable alumni ==
- Brett Alan August (1970), recipient of the French Legion of Honor in 2015
- Otis F. Glenn (1898), U.S. Senator
- Steven Hatfill (1971), pathologist
- Kyle Hudson (2004), professional baseball player, Illini football and baseball
- Joe Knollenberg (1951), U.S. Congressman
- Will Leitch (1993), writer
- Dale Righter (1984), Illinois State Senator
- Bill Tate (1948), Wake Forest football coach, ILLINI 52 Rose Bowl MVP
- Craig Titley (1985), movie writer
- Arland D. Williams, Jr. (1953), a hero of Air Florida Flight 90 in January 1982, who gave his life and died to help five other survivors of the plane crash, all of whom lived.
