= East Oakland Township, Coles County, Illinois =

East Oakland Township
- Township
- Location in Coles County

- Coles County's location in Illinois
- Coordinates: 39°38′N 88°1′W
- Country: United States
- State: Illinois
- County: Coles
- Established: November 8, 1859

Area
  - Total: 39.33 sq mi (101.9 km^{2})
  - Land: 39.25 sq mi (101.7 km^{2})
  - Water: 0.08 sq mi (0.21 km^{2}) 0.20%
- Elevation: 659 ft (201 m)

Population (2020)
  - Total: 1,229
  - Density: 31.31/sq mi (12.09/km^{2})
- Time zone: UTC-6 (CST)
  - Summer (DST): UTC-5 (CDT)
- ZIP codes: 61912, 61943
- FIPS code: 17-029-22138

East Oakland Township is one of twelve townships in Coles County, Illinois, USA. As of the 2020 census, its population was 1,229 and it contained 628 housing units. The township changed its name from Oakland Township on May 7, 1860.

== Geography ==
According to the 2010 census, the township has a total area of 39.33 square miles (101.9 km^{2}), of which 39.25 square miles (101.7 km^{2}) (or 99.80%) is land and 0.08 square miles (0.21 km^{2}) (or 0.20%) is water.

=== Cities, towns, villages ===
- Oakland

=== Extinct towns ===
- Kings
- Pinhook

=== Cemeteries ===
The township contains six cemeteries: Bell, Berry, Fairview, Oak Grove, Rosedale and Shields.

=== Major highways ===
- Illinois Route 133

== Demographics ==
As of the 2020 census there were 1,229 people, 711 households, and 399 families residing in the township. The population density was 31.19 inhabitants per square mile (12.04/km^{2}). There were 628 housing units at an average density of 15.94 units per square mile (6.15 units/km^{2}). The racial makeup of the township was 95.12% White, 0.24% African American, 0.08% Native American, 0.24% Asian, 0.08% Pacific Islander, 0.24% from other races, and 3.99% from two or more races. Hispanic or Latino of any race were 1.87% of the population.

There were 711 households, out of which 24.10% had children under the age of 18 living with them, 44.16% were married couples living together, 2.11% had a female householder with no spouse present, and 43.88% were non-families. 35.70% of all households were made up of individuals, and 16.20% had someone living alone who was 65 years of age or older. The average household size was 2.20 and the average family size was 2.92.

The township's age distribution consisted of 22.5% under the age of 18, 6.8% from 18 to 24, 17.8% from 25 to 44, 33.5% from 45 to 64, and 19.4% who were 65 years of age or older. The median age was 48.3 years. For every 100 females, there were 91.6 males. For every 100 females age 18 and over, there were 98.5 males.

The median income for a household in the township was $45,580, and the median income for a family was $66,250. Males had a median income of $42,241 versus $24,213 for females. The per capita income for the township was $27,484. About 6.5% of families and 12.2% of the population were below the poverty line, including 5.6% of those under age 18 and 5.9% of those age 65 or over.

Historical population
Census	Pop.	Note	%±
2010	1,388		—
2020	1,229		−11.5%
U.S. Decennial Census

== School districts ==
- Kansas Community Unit School District 3
- Oakland Community Unit School District 5

== Political districts ==
- Illinois' 15th congressional district
- State House District 110
- State Senate District 55
