= Lake Paradise (Illinois) =

- Location within Illinois Location within the United States
- Location: Coles County, Illinois
- Coordinates: 39°24′40″N 88°26′30″W
- Type: Reservoir
- Basin countries: United States
- Surface area: 775 acres (3.14 km^{2})
- Surface elevation: 174 ft (53 m)

Lake Paradise is a reservoir on the Little Wabash River in Coles County, Illinois, United States. The reservoir covers an area of 174 acres (0.70 km^{2}). The community of Paradise is located near the lake's southern shore. The Little Wabash River was dammed to create the lake in 1929.
