= Senator Pemberton =

Senator Pemberton may refer to:

- Dewayne Pemberton (born 1956), Oklahoma State Senate
- Stanton C. Pemberton (1858–1944), Illinois State Senate
