= Bill Cox (baseball) =

American baseball player and politician (1913–1988)

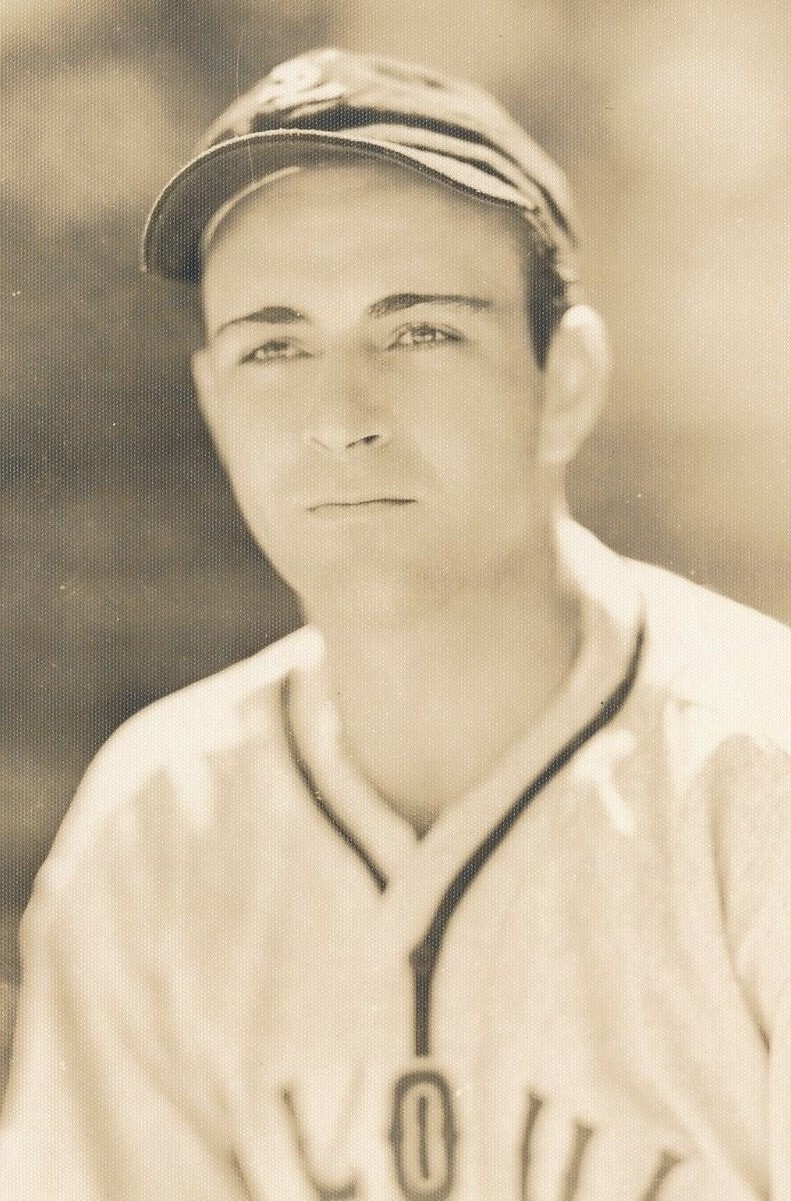
- Pitcher
- Born: June 23, 1913; Ashmore, Illinois, U.S.
- Died: February 16, 1988 (aged 74); Charleston, Illinois, U.S.
- Batted: Right Threw: Right

MLB debut
- June 6, 1936, for the St. Louis Cardinals

Last MLB appearance
- July 31, 1940, for the St. Louis Browns

MLB statistics
- Win–loss record: 2–9
- Earned run average: 6.46
- Strikeouts: 45
- Stats at Baseball Reference

Teams
- St. Louis Cardinals (1936); Chicago White Sox (1937–1938); St. Louis Browns (1938–1940)

William Donald Cox (June 23, 1913 – February 16, 1988) was an American politician and professional baseball pitcher.

== Baseball career ==
Cox played all or part of five seasons in Major League Baseball, from 1936 until 1940, for the St. Louis Cardinals, Chicago White Sox and St. Louis Browns. He also officiated at high school and college basketball games and at the Illinois State High School Finals in Champaign, Illinois.

== Political career ==
Cox served in the United States Army during World War II. He served on the Coles County, Illinois School Board Unit No. One from 1954 to 1958. He also served as sheriff of Coles County from 1958 to 1962 and as treasurer of Coles County from 1962 to 1966. Cox was a Republican. Cox served in the Illinois House of Representatives from 1967 to 1973.

=== Indictment, conviction, and resignation ===
On September 26, 1973, Cox pleaded guilty in the United States District Court to mail fraud and filing a false income tax return. United States District Court judge Harlington Wood Jr. presided over the trial. On November 1, 1973, Cox resigned from the Illinois General Assembly; he was also sentenced to fifteen months in prison for a scheme to defraud the state of Illinois and for filing a false income tax return.
