= Embarrass, Illinois =

- Unincorporated community
- Location within Illinois Location within the United States
- Coordinates: 39°31′02″N 88°05′28″W
- Country: United States
- State: Illinois
- County: Coles
- Elevation: 659 ft (201 m)
- Time zone: UTC-6 (Central (CST))
  - Summer (DST): UTC-5 (CDT)
- Area code: 217
- GNIS feature ID: 422668

Embarrass is an unincorporated community in Coles County, Illinois, United States. Embarrass is located on Illinois Route 16, 4 miles (6.4 km) southwest of Ashmore. It is adjacent to the Embarras River.
