= Ashmore Township, Coles County, Illinois =

Ashmore Township
- Township
- Location in Coles County

- Coles County's location in Illinois
- Coordinates: 39°32′N 88°2′W
- Country: United States
- State: Illinois
- County: Coles
- Established: November 8, 1859

Area
  - Total: 53.69 sq mi (139.1 km^{2})
  - Land: 53.59 sq mi (138.8 km^{2})
  - Water: 0.1 sq mi (0.26 km^{2}) 0.19%
- Elevation: 692 ft (211 m)

Population (2020)
  - Total: 1,158
  - Density: 21.61/sq mi (8.343/km^{2})
- Time zone: UTC-6 (CST)
  - Summer (DST): UTC-5 (CDT)
- ZIP codes: 61912, 61920, 61933, 61943 62474
- FIPS code: 17-029-02570

Ashmore Township is one of twelve townships in Coles County, Illinois, USA. As of the 2020 census, its population was 1,158 and it contained 575 housing units.

== Geography ==
According to the 2010 census, the township has a total area of 53.69 square miles (139.1 km^{2}), of which 53.59 square miles (138.8 km^{2}) (or 99.81%) is land and 0.1 square miles (0.26 km^{2}) (or 0.19%) is water.

=== Cities, towns, villages ===
- Ashmore

=== Extinct towns ===
- Embarrass
- Hitesville

=== Cemeteries ===
The township contains these ten cemeteries: Ashmore, Brooks, Enon, Lafler, Miller, Patsy Mitchell, Reed, Saint Omer, Shoot and Zimmerman.

=== Major highways ===
- Illinois Route 16
- Illinois Route 49

=== Airports and landing strips ===
- John R Reed Airport

== Demographics ==
As of the 2020 census there were 1,158 people, 639 households, and 422 families residing in the township. The population density was 21.58 inhabitants per square mile (8.33/km^{2}). There were 575 housing units at an average density of 10.72 units per square mile (4.14 units/km^{2}). The racial makeup of the township was 96.72% White, 0.35% African American, 0.52% Native American, 0.43% Asian, 0.00% Pacific Islander, 0.00% from other races, and 1.99% from two or more races. Hispanic or Latino of any race were 0.60% of the population.

There were 639 households, out of which 31.50% had children under the age of 18 living with them, 53.99% were married couples living together, 11.11% had a female householder with no spouse present, and 33.96% were non-families. 26.60% of all households were made up of individuals, and 14.90% had someone living alone who was 65 years of age or older. The average household size was 2.23 and the average family size was 2.64.

The township's age distribution consisted of 19.0% under the age of 18, 9.1% from 18 to 24, 22.9% from 25 to 44, 30% from 45 to 64, and 19.0% who were 65 years of age or older. The median age was 44.2 years. For every 100 females, there were 92.3 males. For every 100 females age 18 and over, there were 77.5 males.

The median income for a household in the township was $53,359, and the median income for a family was $65,161. Males had a median income of $36,875 versus $25,852 for females. The per capita income for the township was $28,596. About 12.8% of families and 16.1% of the population were below the poverty line, including 29.6% of those under age 18 and 7.7% of those age 65 or over.

Historical population
| Census | Pop. | Note | %± |
|---|---|---|---|
| 2010 | 1,364 | | — |
| 2020 | 1,158 | | −15.1% |
U.S. Decennial Census

== School districts ==
- Casey-Westfield Community Unit School District 4c
- Charleston Community Unit School District 1
- Kansas Community Unit School District 3
- Oakland Community Unit School District 5

== Political districts ==
- Illinois' 15th congressional district
- State House District 110
- State Senate District 55
