= Humboldt Township, Coles County, Illinois =

Humboldt Township
- Township
- Location in Coles County

- Coles County's location in Illinois
- Coordinates: 39°35′N 88°17′W
- Country: United States
- State: Illinois
- County: Coles
- Established: November 8, 1859

Area
  - Total: 53.57 sq mi (138.7 km^{2})
  - Land: 53.52 sq mi (138.6 km^{2})
  - Water: 0.05 sq mi (0.13 km^{2}) 0.09%
- Elevation: 669 ft (204 m)

Population (2020)
  - Total: 1,161
  - Density: 21.69/sq mi (8.376/km^{2})
- Time zone: UTC-6 (CST)
  - Summer (DST): UTC-5 (CDT)
- ZIP codes: 61910, 61920, 61931, 61938
- FIPS code: 17-029-36555

Humboldt Township is one of twelve townships in Coles County, Illinois, United States. As of the 2020 census, its population was 1,161 and it contained 545 housing units. The township changed its name from Milton Township on May 7, 1860.

== Geography ==
According to the 2010 census, the township has a total area of 53.57 square miles (138.7 km^{2}), of which 53.52 square miles (138.6 km^{2}) (or 99.91%) is land and 0.05 square miles (0.13 km^{2}) (or 0.09%) is water.

=== Cities, towns, villages ===
- Humboldt

=== Extinct towns ===
- Dorans

=== Cemeteries ===
The township contains four cemeteries: East Humboldt, Gardner, Humboldt and Township.

=== Major highways ===
- Interstate 57
- US Route 45

== Demographics ==
As of the 2020 census there were 1,161 people, 388 households, and 272 families residing in the township. The population density was 21.69 inhabitants per square mile (8.37/km^{2}). There were 545 housing units at an average density of 10.18 units per square mile (3.93 units/km^{2}). The racial makeup of the township was 93.63% White, 0.95% African American, 0.09% Native American, 0.17% Asian, 0.00% Pacific Islander, 2.07% from other races, and 3.10% from two or more races. Hispanic or Latino of any race were 3.96% of the population.

There were 388 households, out of which 44.80% had children under the age of 18 living with them, 40.21% were married couples living together, 14.43% had a female householder with no spouse present, and 29.90% were non-families. 26.30% of all households were made up of individuals, and 13.90% had someone living alone who was 65 years of age or older. The average household size was 2.67 and the average family size was 3.29.

The township's age distribution consisted of 30.4% under the age of 18, 3.3% from 18 to 24, 30.5% from 25 to 44, 22.7% from 45 to 64, and 13.0% who were 65 years of age or older. The median age was 33.6 years. For every 100 females, there were 150.6 males. For every 100 females age 18 and over, there were 102.8 males.

The median income for a household in the township was $36,288, and the median income for a family was $49,531. Males had a median income of $29,554 versus $23,036 for females. The per capita income for the township was $17,812. About 11.0% of families and 17.9% of the population were below the poverty line, including 27.8% of those under age 18 and 1.5% of those age 65 or over.

Historical population
| Census | Pop. | Note | %± |
|---|---|---|---|
| 2010 | 1,341 | | — |
| 2020 | 1,161 | | −13.4% |
U.S. Decennial Census

== School districts ==
- Arcola Consolidated Unit School District 306
- Mattoon Community Unit School District 2

== Political districts ==
- Illinois's 15th congressional district
- State House District 110
- State Senate District 55
