= Trilla, Illinois =

Trilla
- Unincorporated community
- Location within Illinois
- Coordinates: 39°22′28″N 088°21′03″W
- Country: United States
- State: Illinois
- County: Coles
- Township: Pleasant Grove

Area
  - Total: 0.19 sq mi (0.50 km^{2})
  - Land: 0.19 sq mi (0.50 km^{2})
  - Water: 0 sq mi (0.00 km^{2})
- Elevation: 656 ft (200 m)

Population (2020)
  - Total: 156
  - Density: 809.2/sq mi (312.44/km^{2})
- Time zone: UTC-6 (Central (CST))
  - Summer (DST): UTC-5 (CDT)
- ZIP code: 62440
- FIPS code: 17-76017
- GNIS feature ID: 2806573

Trilla is an unincorporated community in Pleasant Grove Township, Coles County, Illinois, United States.

As of the 2020 census, Trilla had a population of 156.

== Demographics ==
Historical population
Census	Pop.	Note	%±
2020	156		—
U.S. Decennial Census

Trilla first appeared as a census designated place in the 2020 U.S. census.

== Transportation ==
Coles County Zipline provides dial-a-ride bus transit service to the city. The nearest passenger rail service is at Mattoon station, where Amtrak operates to Chicago, Carbondale, New Orleans, and other destinations.

== Education ==
It is in the Mattoon Community Unit School District 2. The district's comprehensive high school is Mattoon High School.
