= Paradise, Illinois =

- Unincorporated community
- Location within Illinois Location within the United States
- Coordinates: 39°24′37″N 88°26′12″W
- Country: United States
- State: Illinois
- County: Coles
- Elevation: 676 ft (206 m)
- Time zone: UTC-6 (Central (CST))
  - Summer (DST): UTC-5 (CDT)
- Area code: 217
- GNIS feature ID: 415368

Paradise is an unincorporated community in Coles County, Illinois, United States. Paradise is located near the south shore of Lake Paradise, 6 miles (9.7 km) south-southwest of Mattoon.
