= Ray Fisher (defensive lineman) =

American football player (1934–2025)

No. 73
- Position: Defensive tackle

Personal information
- Born: February 12, 1934; Charleston, Illinois, U.S.
- Died: April 8, 2025 (aged 91); Fairfield, Illinois, U.S.
- Listed height: 6 ft 0 in (1.83 m)
- Listed weight: 230 lb (104 kg)

Career information
- High school: Charleston (IL)
- College: Eastern Illinois
- NFL draft: 1958: undrafted

Career history
- Pittsburgh Steelers (1959); Dallas Cowboys (1960)

Awards and highlights
- 2× Football All-IIAC (1954, 1955); 2× Wrestling All-IIAC (1954, 1955); Track All-IIAC (1955)

Career NFL statistics
- Games played: 12
- Stats at Pro Football Reference

Raymond Edward Fisher (February 12, 1934 – April 4, 2025) was an American professional football defensive tackle in the National Football League for the Pittsburgh Steelers and Dallas Cowboys. He played college football at Eastern Illinois University.

== Early life ==
Fisher attended Charleston High School, where he practiced football and track, while advancing to the state championship as a shot putter.

He accepted a football scholarship from Eastern Illinois University, where he lettered in football, track and wrestling.

In wrestling, he was the heavyweight conference champion in 1954 and 1955. In track, he was the conference's shot put champion in 1955. In football, he was a three-year starter at defensive tackle. He received All-IIAC in his last 2 years.

From 1956 to 1958, he played football in the U.S. Marine Corps and won the All-Service Championship in 1958.

In 1983, he was inducted into the Eastern Illinois University Athletics Hall of Fame.

== Professional career ==
=== Pittsburgh Steelers ===
Fisher was signed as an undrafted free agent by the Pittsburgh Steelers after the 1959 NFL draft and became a starter on the defensive line as a rookie.

=== Dallas Cowboys ===
Fisher was selected by the Dallas Cowboys in the 1960 NFL expansion draft. He was lost for the franchise's inaugural season after suffering a left knee injury in pre-season. He was waived on July 31, 1961.

== Personal life ==
After retiring as a player, he became an assistant football coach with the Pittsburgh Steelers.

== Death ==
He died on April 8, 2025 at the age of 91.
