= Wabash Point, Illinois =

- Unincorporated community
- Location within Illinois Location within the United States
- Coordinates: 39°26′32″N 88°25′15″W
- Country: United States
- State: Illinois
- County: Coles
- Elevation: 705 ft (215 m)
- Time zone: UTC-6 (Central (CST))
  - Summer (DST): UTC-5 (CDT)
- Area code: 217
- GNIS feature ID: 1807924

Wabash Point is an unincorporated community in Coles County, Illinois, United States. Wabash Point is 3.5 miles (5.6 km) southwest of Mattoon.
