= Charleston Township, Coles County, Illinois =

Charleston Township
- Township
- Location in Coles County

- Coles County's location in Illinois
- Coordinates: 39°29′N 88°11′W
- Country: United States
- State: Illinois
- County: Coles
- Established: November 8, 1859

Area
  - Total: 37.91 sq mi (98.2 km^{2})
  - Land: 37.19 sq mi (96.3 km^{2})
  - Water: 0.72 sq mi (1.9 km^{2}) 1.90%
- Elevation: 686 ft (209 m)

Population (2020)
  - Total: 19,313
  - Density: 519.3/sq mi (200.5/km^{2})
- Time zone: UTC-6 (CST)
  - Summer (DST): UTC-5 (CDT)
- ZIP codes: 61912, 61920 62440
- FIPS code: 17-029-12580

Charleston Township is one of twelve townships in Coles County, Illinois, USA. As of the 2020 census, its population was 19,313 and it contained 9,194 housing units. Eastern Illinois University is located in this township.

== History ==
Charleston Township was named for one of its founders, Charles Morton.

== Geography ==
According to the 2010 census, the township has a total area of 37.91 square miles (98.2 km^{2}), of which 37.19 square miles (96.3 km^{2}) (or 98.10%) is land and 0.72 square miles (1.9 km^{2}) (or 1.90%) is water.

=== Cities, towns, villages ===
- Charleston (west three-quarters)

=== Cemeteries ===
The township contains fourteen cemeteries: Adkins, Chambers, Cossel, Fudge, Huckaba, Kickapoo, Lumbrick, Mound, Old Charleston, Roselawn, Salem, Stoner, Unity and Yocum.

=== Major highways ===
- Illinois Route 16
- Illinois Route 130

=== Landmarks ===
- Coles County Fairgrounds
- Eastern Illinois University
- Horse Racing Track

== Demographics ==
As of the 2020 census there were 19,313 people, 8,615 households, and 4,475 families residing in the township. The population density was 509.94 inhabitants per square mile (196.89/km^{2}). There were 9,194 housing units at an average density of 242.76 units per square mile (93.73 units/km^{2}). The racial makeup of the township was 81.17% White, 7.62% African American, 0.26% Native American, 2.36% Asian, 0.12% Pacific Islander, 3.54% from other races, and 4.93% from two or more races. Hispanic or Latino of any race were 5.45% of the population.

There were 8,615 households, out of which 21.80% had children under the age of 18 living with them, 36.89% were married couples living together, 11.27% had a female householder with no spouse present, and 48.06% were non-families. 33.40% of all households were made up of individuals, and 9.00% had someone living alone who was 65 years of age or older. The average household size was 2.18 and the average family size was 2.72.

The township's age distribution consisted of 13.3% under the age of 18, 30.2% from 18 to 24, 24.5% from 25 to 44, 19.4% from 45 to 64, and 12.6% who were 65 years of age or older. The median age was 29.2 years. For every 100 females, there were 92.7 males. For every 100 females age 18 and over, there were 91.6 males.

The median income for a household in the township was $44,508, and the median income for a family was $57,182. Males had a median income of $25,956 versus $17,931 for females. The per capita income for the township was $26,122. About 14.7% of families and 24.6% of the population were below the poverty line, including 21.2% of those under age 18 and 5.1% of those age 65 or over.

Historical population
| Census | Pop. | Note | %± |
|---|---|---|---|
| 2000 | 22,901 | | — |
| 2010 | 23,916 | | 4.4% |
| 2020 | 19,313 | | −19.2% |
U.S. Decennial Census

== School districts ==
- Charleston Community Unit School District 1

== Political districts ==
- Illinois's 15th congressional district
- State House District 110
- State Senate District 55
