= Pleasant Grove Township, Coles County, Illinois =

Pleasant Grove Township
- Township
- Location in Coles County

- Coles County's location in Illinois
- Coordinates: 39°24′N 88°16′W
- Country: United States
- State: Illinois
- County: Coles
- Established: November 8, 1859

Area
  - Total: 41.65 sq mi (107.9 km^{2})
  - Land: 41.64 sq mi (107.8 km^{2})
  - Water: 0.01 sq mi (0.026 km^{2}) 0.02%
- Elevation: 732 ft (223 m)

Population (2020)
  - Total: 1,227
  - Density: 29.47/sq mi (11.38/km^{2})
- Time zone: UTC-6 (CST)
  - Summer (DST): UTC-5 (CDT)
- ZIP codes: 61920, 61938, 62440, 62469
- FIPS code: 17-029-60469

Pleasant Grove Township is one of twelve townships in Coles County, Illinois, USA. As of the 2020 census, its population was 1,227 and it contained 584 housing units.

== Geography ==
According to the 2010 census, the township has a total area of 41.65 square miles (107.9 km^{2}), of which 41.64 square miles (107.8 km^{2}) (or 99.98%) is land and 0.01 square miles (0.026 km^{2}) (or 0.02%) is water.

=== Cities, towns, villages ===
- Lerna

=== Unincorporated towns ===
- Trilla

=== Extinct towns ===
- Campbell

=== Cemeteries ===
The township contains 14 cemeteries: Armstrong, Bales, Beals, Doty, Janesville, Leitch, Lower Muddy, Mount Tabor, New Indian Creek, New Kelley, Old Indian Creek, Shiloh, Upper Muddy and Wright.

=== Rivers ===
- Embarras River

=== Landmarks ===
- Janesville

== Demographics ==
As of the 2020 census there were 1,227 people, 521 households, and 339 families residing in the township. The population density was 29.42 inhabitants per square mile (11.36/km^{2}). There were 584 housing units at an average density of 14.00 units per square mile (5.41 units/km^{2}). The racial makeup of the township was 93.24% White, 0.41% African American, 0.08% Native American, 0.90% Asian, 0.00% Pacific Islander, 0.57% from other races, and 4.81% from two or more races. Hispanic or Latino of any race were 1.06% of the population.

There were 521 households, out of which 20.50% had children under the age of 18 living with them, 56.43% were married couples living together, 5.95% had a female householder with no spouse present, and 34.93% were non-families. 30.70% of all households were made up of individuals, and 12.50% had someone living alone who was 65 years of age or older. The average household size was 2.12 and the average family size was 2.57.

The township's age distribution consisted of 13.8% under the age of 18, 8.9% from 18 to 24, 19.9% from 25 to 44, 38.3% from 45 to 64, and 19.0% who were 65 years of age or older. The median age was 51.9 years. For every 100 females, there were 86.5 males. For every 100 females age 18 and over, there were 93.4 males.

The median income for a household in the township was $52,543, and the median income for a family was $71,050. Males had a median income of $32,067 versus $26,850 for females. The per capita income for the township was $29,661. About 3.8% of families and 11.2% of the population were below the poverty line, including 11.0% of those under age 18 and 9.9% of those age 65 or over.

Historical population
Census	Pop.	Note	%±
2010	1,327		—
2020	1,227		−7.5%
U.S. Decennial Census

== School districts ==
- Charleston Community Unit School District 1
- Mattoon Community Unit School District 2
- Neoga Community Unit School District 3

== Political districts ==
- Illinois' 15th congressional district
- State House District 110
- State Senate District 55
