= Cal Crum =

American baseball player (1889–1945)

- Pitcher
- Born: July 27, 1889; Cooks Mills, Illinois, U.S.
- Died: July 7, 1945 (aged 55); Tulsa, Oklahoma, U.S.
- Batted: Right Threw: Right

MLB debut
- May 4, 1917, for the Boston Braves

Last MLB appearance
- April 23, 1918, for the Boston Braves

MLB statistics
- Win–loss record: 0–1
- Earned run average: 10.80
- Strikeouts: 0
- Stats at Baseball Reference

Teams
- Boston Braves (1917–1918)

Clarence Newton Crum (July 27, 1889 – July 7, 1945) was an American professional baseball player. In an eight-year career, Crum played in the 1917 and 1918 Major League Baseball seasons for the Boston Braves. Crum was officially listed as standing 6 feet 1 inch (185 cm) and weighing 175 pounds (79 kg).

== Early life ==
Crum was born on either July 27, 1889, or July 27, 1890, in Cooks Mills, Illinois.

== Career ==
Crum began playing professional baseball in 1914, spending the year with two teams: the Charleston Senators of the Ohio State League and the Portsmouth Cobblers of the same league. Combined, Crum recorded a 19–13 win–loss record over 19 games pitched. Offensively, he batted .271 with 108 hits and seven home runs.

In 1915, Crum was promoted to the B-level, playing for the San Antonio Bronchos and the Shreveport Gassers, both of the Texas League. Over the 1915 season, Crum pitched 105.2 innings, allowing 64 runs off of 107 hits. He had a batting average of .176 with six total bases.

In 1916, Crum again played for two teams: the Terre Haute Highlanders of Terre Haute, Indiana, and the Muskegon Reds of Muskegon, Michigan. For the two teams, Crum posted a win–loss record of 10–11 over 31 games pitched. Crum's earned run average (ERA), 2.26, was the second best on the Muskegon Reds (Louis LeRoy recorded an ERA of 1.90 over eight games pitched).

Crum made his Major League debut on May 4, 1917, for the Boston Braves. For the year, he pitched one game, allowing a walk and a hit over one inning pitched.

Crum appeared in one game for the Braves in 1918, recording a loss and a 15.43 ERA, the latter being the worst on the team for the 1918 season. Afterwards, on May 6, 1918, Crum was traded, along with Tex Covington, to the Indianapolis Indians for Dana Fillingim. Over the 1918 season, Crum recorded a 2.50 ERA, and, at age 28, was the second-youngest pitcher on the team.

In 1919, Crum continued his stint with the Indians. His 20 wins and 14 losses were second on the team to former Detroit Tiger Pug Cavet. Crum's 1920 season consisted of playing four games for the Indians. After not playing in the 1921 and 1922 seasons, Crum played his final minor-league baseball season with the Tulsa Oilers. Crum played in eight games for the Oilers, recording a team-best winning percentage of 1.000.

== After baseball ==
Crum died on either July 7, 1945, or December 7, 1945, in Tulsa, Oklahoma, and was buried in Memorial Park Cemetery in Tulsa.
