= Michael Kleen =

American folklorist and politician

- Born: Chicago, IL, U.S.
- Education: MS education, MA history, BA philosophy
- Occupation: Writer
- Known for: Folklore social commentary
- Website: http://www.michaelkleen.com/

Michael Alan Kleen is a publisher, folklorist, and politician from Illinois. He was the 2013 Republican nominee for mayor of Rockford, Illinois. In a three-way race, he finished third with 18 percent of the vote.

== Early life and education ==
Kleen was born in Chicago and grew up in the northwest suburb of Des Plaines, Illinois. He received a B.A. in Philosophy in 2006 and M.A. in History in 2008 from Eastern Illinois University in Charleston, Illinois, and a M.S. in Education in 2011 from Western Illinois University in Macomb, Illinois.

While at Eastern, Michael began writing about local folklore, founded the publishing company Black Oak Press Illinois, and wrote a bi weekly column for the Daily Eastern News. From 2004 to 2007, he was head of an informal group at EIU that visited allegedly haunted places around Coles County, Illinois. In 2005 he wrote and published Tales of Coles County, Illinois, a collection of short historical fiction stories set in Coles County. He also authored "The Legend of Pemberton Hall" in 2008, a stand-alone electronic article highlighting the ghost story surrounding Eastern Illinois University's Pemberton Hall, which is the oldest all-female dormitory in the State of Illinois.

In the fall of 2007, Michael presented a paper on Copperheads at the 2007 Conference on Illinois History in Springfield, Illinois. His presentation led to being a featured commentator on the subject for an article on Charleston's historical mural depicting the Charleston Riot of 1864. He also gave a presentation on local folklore at the Charleston Middle School, which made front page news in the Times-Courier.

Recently, Michael's publication, the Legends and Lore of Illinois, has gained attention around the state of Illinois, and was featured in the Effingham Daily News and the Streator Times.

== Black Oak Media ==
In 2006, Michael founded a publishing company called Black Oak Media, which was incorporated five years later. Between 2007 and 2010, the company produced publications like Black Oak Presents (a journal of middle American art and culture) and the Legends and lore of Illinois, a monthly serial devoted to areas of interest in the folklore of Illinois. Black Oak Media began formally publishing book titles in the summer of 2011.

== Commentary ==
Michael's opinion columns have appeared in newspapers such as the Disclosure, Daily Eastern News, Daily Egyptian, and Rock River Times, and on websites such as Strike-the-Root, WorldNetDaily, C4SS.org, Lost Liberty Café, and VDARE. He was the Friday guest editor at Strike-the-Root.com from 2010 to 2012.

== Political career ==
In 2012, Kleen was a Republican candidate for Winnebago County Board District 8. In the March primary election, Kleen received 42.6 percent of the vote, losing to incumbent Dianne Parvin.

On Nov 19, 2012, Kleen filed to run for mayor of Rockford. No other Republicans filed in the race, making him the de facto GOP nominee.

== Bibliography ==
- Haunting Illinois: A Tourist’s Guide to the Weird and Wild Places of the Prairie State. Holt: Thunder Bay Press, 2011.
- Home of the Brave, Part 1: A Rope of Sand. Rockford: Black Oak Media, 2011.
- Tales of Coles County, Illinois (2010). Rockford: Black Oak Press, Illinois, 2010.
- Paranormal Illinois. Atglen: Schiffer Publishing, 2010.
- One Voice. Rockford: Black Oak Press, Illinois, 2009.
- Legends and Lore of Illinois: Case Files Volume 1. Rockford: Black Oak Press, Illinois, 2009.
- Six Tales of Terror: Short Stories for Dark and Stormy Nights. Charleston: Black Oak Press, Illinois, 2005. Re-Released as a digital book in 2011.
