= Hutton, Illinois =

- Unincorporated community
- Location within Illinois Location within the United States
- Coordinates: 39°24′45″N 88°05′04″W
- Country: United States
- State: Illinois
- County: Coles
- Elevation: 702 ft (214 m)
- Time zone: UTC-6 (Central (CST))
  - Summer (DST): UTC-5 (CDT)
- Area code: 217
- GNIS feature ID: 422834

Hutton is an unincorporated community in Coles County, Illinois, United States. Hutton is 7 miles (11 km) southeast of Charleston and used to be known as Salisbury.
