= Diona, Illinois =

- Unincorporated community
- Location within Illinois Location within the United States
- Coordinates: 39°22′36″N 88°08′21″W
- Country: United States
- State: Illinois
- County: Coles
- Elevation: 617 ft (188 m)
- Time zone: UTC-6 (Central (CST))
  - Summer (DST): UTC-5 (CDT)
- Area code: 217
- GNIS feature ID: 422628

Diona is an unincorporated community in Coles County, Illinois, United States. Diona is located near Illinois Route 130, 8 miles (13 km) south of Charleston.

== History ==
A post office was established at Diona in 1869, and remained in operation until 1902. The etymology of the name Diona is uncertain.
