= Magnet, Illinois =

- Unincorporated community
- Location within Illinois Location within the United States
- Coordinates: 39°26′21″N 88°23′52″W
- Country: United States
- State: Illinois
- County: Coles
- Elevation: 755 ft (230 m)
- Time zone: UTC-6 (Central (CST))
  - Summer (DST): UTC-5 (CDT)
- Area code: 217
- GNIS feature ID: 422930

Magnet is an unincorporated community in Coles County, Illinois, United States. Magnet is located along a railroad line south-southwest of Mattoon.
