= Dorans, Illinois =

- Unincorporated community
- Location within Illinois Location within the United States
- Coordinates: 39°33′04″N 88°20′40″W
- Country: United States
- State: Illinois
- County: Coles
- Elevation: 686 ft (209 m)
- Time zone: UTC-6 (Central (CST))
  - Summer (DST): UTC-5 (CDT)
- Area code: 217
- GNIS feature ID: 407317

Dorans is an unincorporated community in Coles County, Illinois, United States. Dorans is located on U.S. Route 45, 5 miles (8.0 km) north-northeast of Mattoon.

== History ==
Dorans had its start in 1878 when the railroad was extended to that point. The community was named for Samuel A. Doran, the original owner of the town site. A post office was established at Dorans in 1898, and remained in operation until 1935.
