= Fairgrange, Illinois =

Fairgrange
- Unincorporated community
- Location within Illinois
- Coordinates: 39°34′43″N 088°10′18″W
- Country: United States
- State: Illinois
- County: Coles
- Township: Seven Hickory
- Elevation: 679 ft (207 m)
- ZIP code: 61920
- GNIS feature ID: 0408153

Fairgrange is an unincorporated community in Seven Hickory Township, Coles County, Illinois, United States.

== Geography ==
Fairgrange is located at 39°34′43″N 088°10′18″W at an elevation of 679 feet.
