= Coles, Illinois =

- Unincorporated community
- Location within Illinois Location within the United States
- Coordinates: 39°31′13″N 88°28′16″W
- Country: United States
- State: Illinois
- County: Coles
- Elevation: 659 ft (201 m)
- Time zone: UTC-6 (Central (CST))
  - Summer (DST): UTC-5 (CDT)
- Area code: 217
- GNIS feature ID: 406356

Coles is an unincorporated community in Coles County, Illinois, United States. Coles is 6 miles (9.7 km) northwest of Mattoon.
