= Ashmore, Illinois =

Ashmore
- Village
- Location of Ashmore in Coles County, Illinois.
- Coordinates: 39°31′50″N 88°01′12″W
- Country: United States
- State: Illinois
- County: Coles
- Township: Ashmore
- Incorporated as a Village: May 3, 1867

Government
  - Type: Trustee-Village Form

Area
  - Total: 0.80 sq mi (2.08 km^{2})
  - Land: 0.80 sq mi (2.08 km^{2})
  - Water: 0 sq mi (0.00 km^{2})
- Elevation: 696 ft (212 m)

Population (2020)
  - Total: 637
  - Density: 792/sq mi (305.7/km^{2})
- Time zone: UTC-6 (CST)
  - Summer (DST): UTC-5 (CDT)
- ZIP code: 61912
- Area code: 217
- FIPS code: 17-02557
- GNIS ID: 2397998
- Website: https://ashmore.gov

Ashmore is a village in the Ashmore Township in Coles County, Illinois, United States. The population was 637 at the 2020 census. It is part of the Charleston–Mattoon Micropolitan Statistical Area. Ashmore, Illinois is the only incorporated community in the United States called "Ashmore."

== Geography ==
According to the 2021 census gazetteer files, Ashmore has a total area of 0.81 square miles (2.10 km^{2}), all land.

== Demographics ==
Historical population
| Census | Pop. | Note | %± |
|---|---|---|---|
| 1880 | 403 | | — |
| 1890 | 446 | | 10.7% |
| 1900 | 476 | | 6.7% |
| 1910 | 511 | | 7.4% |
| 1920 | 548 | | 7.2% |
| 1930 | 431 | | −21.4% |
| 1940 | 454 | | 5.3% |
| 1950 | 406 | | −10.6% |
| 1960 | 447 | | 10.1% |
| 1970 | 428 | | −4.3% |
| 1980 | 883 | | 106.3% |
| 1990 | 800 | | −9.4% |
| 2000 | 809 | | 1.1% |
| 2010 | 785 | | −3.0% |
| 2020 | 637 | | −18.9% |
U.S. Decennial Census

As of the 2020 census there were 637 people, 421 households, and 299 families residing in the village. The population density was 791.30 inhabitants per square mile (305.52/km^{2}). There were 314 housing units at an average density of 390.06 per square mile (150.60/km^{2}). The racial makeup of the village was 97.02% White, 0.63% African American, 0.16% Native American, 0.31% Asian, and 1.88% from two or more races. Hispanic or Latino of any race were 0.78% of the population.

There were 421 households, out of which 47.0% had children under the age of 18 living with them, 55.34% were married couples living together, 14.96% had a female householder with no husband present, and 28.98% were non-families. 24.47% of all households were made up of individuals, and 11.88% had someone living alone who was 65 years of age or older. The average household size was 2.79 and the average family size was 2.43.

The village's age distribution consisted of 26.2% under the age of 18, 10.5% from 18 to 24, 27.6% from 25 to 44, 23.9% from 45 to 64, and 11.9% who were 65 years of age or older. The median age was 37.1 years. For every 100 females, there were 108.4 males. For every 100 females age 18 and over, there were 88.7 males.

The median income for a household in the village was $46,307, and the median income for a family was $56,042. Males had a median income of $36,066 versus $28,173 for females. The per capita income for the village was $21,062. About 18.1% of families and 22.3% of the population were below the poverty line, including 29.9% of those under age 18 and 17.4% of those age 65 or over.

== Village Administration ==
The Ashmore Municipal Office is located at 10 W Ashmore St, Ashmore, IL 61912 with a PO Box 99 mailing address. The Village is a non-home rule municipality with a Trustee-Village form of government.

Elected offices in the Village of Ashmore include a Village President, currently held by Kurt Crail, and six Village Trustees, currently Bill Edwards, Thomas "TC" Grissom, Dane Perdieu, Terry Price, L. Bryan Watson, and Cathy Welborn. The positions of Clerk and Treasurer are appointed annually by ordinance.

== Places of interest ==
Ashmore is home to Ashmore Estates, which was originally the almshouse at the Coles County Poor Farm until it was abandoned in 1987.

A gigantic statue of Abraham Lincoln stands in Ashmore. Originally erected in nearby Charleston as a visitor attraction in 1969, the 62-foot statue instead drew widespread ridicule for the cartoonish appearance of its oversized head. A 1978 attempt to sell it to the city of Lincoln was unsuccessful, and it was instead moved to a private site in Ashmore where it fell into a long period of disrepair. New owners eventually converted the site into the Lincoln Springs Resort, and fully restored the statue in 2004 to be the centerpiece of its campgrounds. The site has since reverted to private property again, but the statue remains visible from a distance.

== Transportation ==
Coles County Zipline provides dial-a-ride bus transit service to the city. The nearest passenger rail service is at Mattoon station, where Amtrak operates to Chicago, Carbondale, New Orleans, and other destinations.

== Education ==
It is in the Charleston Community Unit School District 1.

== Notable person ==
- Bill Cox, Illinois state representative and pitcher for various teams
