= Loxa, Illinois =

- Unincorporated community
- Location within Illinois Location within the United States
- Coordinates: 39°29′50″N 88°16′02″W
- Country: United States
- State: Illinois
- County: Coles
- Elevation: 673 ft (205 m)
- Time zone: UTC-6 (Central (CST))
  - Summer (DST): UTC-5 (CDT)
- Area code: 217
- GNIS feature ID: 412727

Loxa is an unincorporated community in Coles County, Illinois, United States. Loxa is located north of Illinois Route 16, halfway between Charleston and Mattoon.

The community may have been named for Loja, Granada, Spain or a shortening of Loxahatchee, Florida.
