= Stanton C. Pemberton =

American politician

Stanton Clayborn Pemberton (July 9, 1858– May 25, 1944) was an American politician and businessman.

== Biography ==
Pemberton was born near Oakland, Illinois. He was involved with the lumber and coal business in Oakland, Illinois. He served in the Illinois Senate from 1897 until 1913. Pemberton was a Republican. He died at the Paris Hospital in Paris, Illinois after suffering a stroke. The Pemberton Hall at Eastern Illinois University in Charleston, Illinois was named after Pemberton who was able to get the appropriation approved for the resident hall.
