= Oakland Community Unit School District 5 =

School district in Illinois, United States

Address
- 310 Teeter Street Oakland, Illinois, 61943; United States

District information
- Type: Public
- Grades: PreK–12
- NCES District ID: 1729340

Students and staff
- Students: 246 (2020–2021)

Other information
- Website: www.oakland5.org

Oakland Community Unit School District 5 is a small unified school district based in the village of Oakland, a small community in the northeastern reaches of Coles County, Illinois; its small student body and few schools suggests that most of the Coles County population centers have already been staked by the other two school districts in the county -- Charleston Community Unit School District 1 and Mattoon Community Unit School District 2. Oakland Community Unit School District 5 is composed of two schools; one school is a combined elementary and junior high school, and the other is a senior high school; students in kindergarten and grades one though eight attend Lake Crest Elementary School, which is under the direction of principal Jim Eastin. Graduates move forward to attend nearby Oakland High School, which educates those in grades nine though twelve; students in this district may then pursue a collegiate education. Oakland High School is governed by the same principal as Lake Crest Elementary School, Jim Eastin. The district superintendent is named Michael Smith, and the districtwide mascot is the Titan.

GreatSchools.net ranked Lake Crest Elementary School at a seven on a scale out of ten; the district's average ISAT scores ranged over a period of time from a 41% mathematics average in the year 2005 to several 100% averages scattered across the past three years in both mathematics and reading.

According to the front page as of the 2007–08 school year, the district is collaborating with Kansas Community Unit School District 3 over the subject of athletics. This partnership has been ongoing since the 2003–04 school year. Athletic teams compete under the name of Tri-County; the mascot is the Titan.
