= Pemberton Hall (Eastern Illinois University) =

- Pemberton Hall and Gymnasium
- U.S. National Register of Historic Places
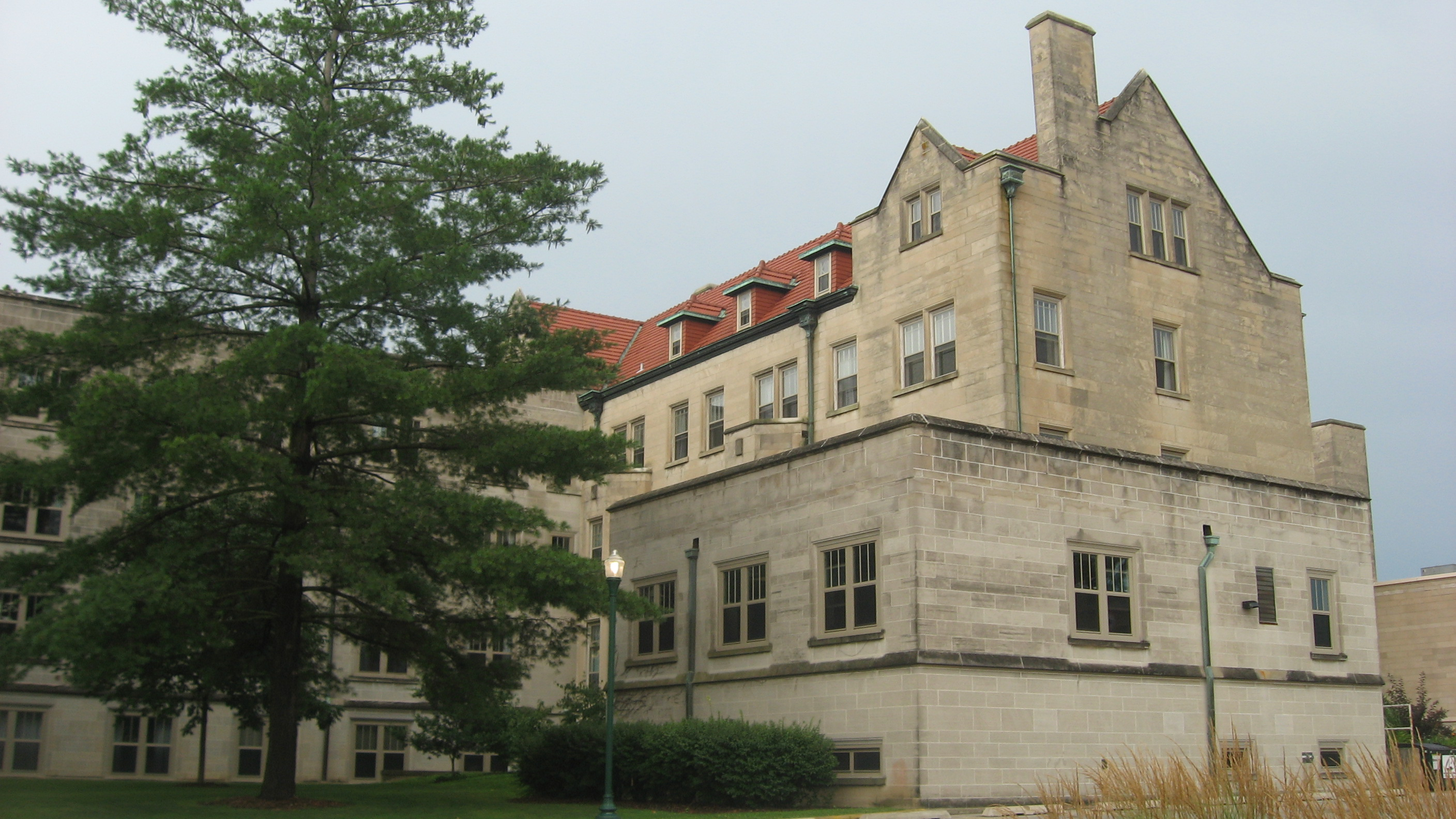
- Northern side and front

- Location within Illinois Location within the United States
- Location: Lincoln Ave. and 4th St., Charleston, Illinois
- Coordinates: 39°29′1″N 88°10′35″W
- Built: 1909
- Architectural style: Gothic Revival
- NRHP reference No.: 82002521
- Added to NRHP: August 26, 1982

Pemberton Hall is a women's residence hall at Eastern Illinois University, in Charleston, Illinois. Located at the north end of the university campus, at the corner of 4th street and Lincoln Avenue, Pemberton Hall is registered as a historic landmark, due to its status as the oldest women's college residence hall in the state.

== History ==
Construction of Pemberton Hall was completed in 1909, when Eastern Illinois University (EIU) was still Eastern Illinois State Normal School. The building was named for Illinois state senator Stanton C. Pemberton, who was instrumental in getting funding for the building approved. The four-story building was designed for residency by approximately 100 female students, and included parlors, fireplaces, fourth floor maid's quarters, a matron's apartment, and a dining room. A small gymnasium for use by all students also was part of the original building. Although only female students lived in Pemberton Hall, and no students were required to live there, the building served as a center of many social functions for the college in its early years, since the first-floor parlor provided space for parties and meetings.

Today, Pemberton Hall has an old section (the portion of the building that dates from 1909) and a new section, built in the early 1960s. With the addition of the new section, Pemberton Hall now can house over 200 students, in single, double, and triple rooms. The former gym is now home to the university's honors college. The matron's quarters are now the ARD's apartment, the fireplaces are not used because of the risk of setting the nearly 100-year-old woodwork on fire, and the fourth floor is used as a storage attic.

== Folklore ==
Pemberton students like to pass on ghost stories concerning the third or fourth floor, and a plaque in the foyer dedicated to the building's first matron, Mary Hawkins. According to campus legend, a student was raped and murdered by a janitor sometime in the early 1900s, and it was Hawkins who discovered the body. The incident deeply affected her, and she sunk into depression and later committed suicide. Reports of paranormal incidents are said to have begun soon afterwards, and are usually attributed to the ghost of Mary Hawkins, still watching over her students, along with the ghost of the murdered girl. They say she talks during early morning hours.
