= Cooks Mills, Illinois =

- Unincorporated community
- Location within Illinois Location within the United States
- Coordinates: 39°34′57″N 88°24′22″W
- Country: United States
- State: Illinois
- County: Coles
- Elevation: 656 ft (200 m)
- Time zone: UTC-6 (Central (CST))
  - Summer (DST): UTC-5 (CDT)
- Area code: 217
- GNIS feature ID: 406509

Cooks Mills is an unincorporated community in Coles County, Illinois, United States. Cooks Mills is 7 miles (11 km) north of Mattoon.

== Notable person ==
- Cal Crum, professional baseball player for the Boston Braves
