= Coles County Zipline =

Provider of mass transportation in Coles County, Illinois

- Headquarters: 651 Jackson Ave, Charleston, Il
- Locale: Charleston and Mattoon, Illinois
- Service area: Coles County, Illinois
- Service type: Bus service
- Routes: 1
- Hubs: Lifespan Center
- Annual ridership: 18,863 (2020)
- Website: Coles County Zipline

Coles County Zipline is a provider of mass transportation in Coles County, Illinois, with deviated fixed-routes serving Charleston and Mattoon. As of 2020, the system provided 18,863 rides over 2,688 annual vehicle revenue hours. The service is a division of Dial-a-Ride Rural Public Transportation, which also provides demand-response service to Coles and Douglas Counties.

== History ==
Public transit in Mattoon has existed since at least 1905, when the Mattoon City Railway Co. provided the city with streetcar service. This was complemented by interurban service from Mattoon to Charleston, which lasted from 1904 to 1927. In 1927, both the interurban and streetcar systems were dismantled, with streetcars in Mattoon being replaced by buses.

Zipline service was temporarily discontinued in March 2020 due to the COVID-19 pandemic, and resumed on March 7, 2022.

== Service ==
Coles County Zipline operates two deviated fixed routes, in addition to the demand-response service provided by Dial-a-Ride Rural Public Transportation. There is one route each in Mattoon and Charleston, with a transfer available between them at the Lifespan Center. Buses operate from 8:00 am to 5:00 pm Monday through Friday. There is no weekend service.

The Charleston route serves Eastern Illinois University, while the Mattoon route provides connections to Mattoon station, which serves Amtrak trains north towards Chicago and south towards Carbondale and New Orleans.

=== Fares ===
Fares are $1.00, with transfers between the routes at the Lifespan Center free.

== Fixed Route Ridership ==
The ridership statistics shown here are of fixed route services only and do not include demand response.

== See also ==
- List of bus transit systems in the United States
- Mattoon station
