= Mattoon Community Unit School District 2 =

School district in Coles County, Illinois, United States

Location
- Mattoon, Coles County, Illinois United States

District information
- Type: Unified School District
- Motto: "Making a Difference, One Student at a Time"
- Grades: PreK-12
- Superintendent: Tim Condron
- Schools: Mattoon High School; Mattoon Middle School (6-8); Riddle Elementary (K-5); Williams Elementary (K-5); Franklin Preschool (PreK)

Other information
- Website: Official website

Mattoon Community Unit School District 2 is a unified school district located in the city of Mattoon, which in turn is located in Coles County, Illinois.

Most of the district is in Coles County. In addition to Mattoon, the district includes Humboldt and Trilla. A portion of the district is in Cumberland County, and a very small portion extends into Moultrie County.

== History ==
Today, Mattoon's chief school district is composed of four schools: Riddle Elementary School, which serves grades K-5; Arland D. Williams, Jr. Elementary School, another elementary school that parallels Riddle in terms of grades; Mattoon Middle School, the district's bridge between the elementary and high schools, serves grades 6-8. Mattoon High School serves grades 9-12, finalizing education for students in the community unit school district. The school runs a prekindergarten program called the Franklin Preschool. The newest edition to the district is Leaders Innovating for Tomorrow (LIFT) Central Illinois, a regional high school innovation center that teaches vocational and hands-on learning.

The current superintendent is Tim Condron, the mascot of Mattoon High School is the green wave, while the mascot of Mattoon Middle School is the wildcat.

The original Mattoon High School, famous for its fish-shaped fountain, was relocated in 1956; the fish fountain, which symbolizes the past and future of the district's students, was moved to the new high school in 2005 during renovations.
