= Charleston Community Unit School District 1 =

School district in Illinois, United States

Location
- 410 West Polk Ave; Charleston, Illinois Coles County, Illinois United States

District information
- Type: Unified School District
- Motto: “A 1st rate public education for a caring community!”
- Grades: PreK-12
- Superintendent: Todd Vilardo
- Schools: Charleston High School (Illinois); Charleston Middle School (7-8); Jefferson Elementary School (4-6); Carl Sandberg Elementary School (1-3); Mark Twain Elementary School (PreK and K); Ashmore Elementary School (PreK-4)

Other information
- Website: http://www.charleston.k12.il.us

Charleston Community Unit School District 1 is a unified school district based in Charleston, the county seat of Coles County, Illinois.

Most of the district is in Coles County. It includes Charleston, Ashmore, Lerna, and Janesville. A portion of the district is in Cumberland County.

== History ==
It was created through the consolidation of the charter school district it was formed from and over sixty-seven other school districts in the area. Charleston Community Unit School District 1 is a conglomerate of six schools, with all but one located in Charleston itself: four elementary schools, one middle school, and one high school form the makeup of the district. Education begins at a prekindergarten level, and those living in the Charleston area attend Mark Twain Elementary School, which prepares early youth for schooling by taking them through prekindergarten and kindergarten under the supervision of principal Denise Titus. Students who live in the far east reaches of Coles County may attend Ashmore Elementary School, which is based in a northeasterly village by the same name; Ashmore's distance from the other schools permits it to educate a larger range of students for the sake of efficiency. The school educates students from kindergarten through grade four, and is governed by Special Education Director, Kristen Brown. Students who graduate from Mark Twain move onwards to Carl Sandburg Elementary School, which educates those in grades one, two, and three under principal Abigail Schmitz. At Jefferson Elementary School in Charleston, the student bodies from both Carl Sandburg Elementary School and Ashmore Elementary School are consolidated. Students from grades four through six are taught in the facility under the supervision of principal Rob Ulm. District students graduating from Jefferson are moved to Charleston Middle School, where they are taught as seventh and eighth graders; the school principal here is Robert Lynn. The last branch of education that Charleston's school district can provide is the education of adolescents in the grades nine through twelve at Charleston High School, which is run by principal Aaron Lock. The superintendent of the schools in the district as of the 2023 school year is Dr. Todd J. Vilardo; lastly, the mascots of the district are the Trojans. There are numerous clubs at Charleston High School; examples include a branch of the International Thespian Society, a branch of the FFA, a newspaper club, and various foreign language honor societies. The high school also sports a junior varsity and varsity Scholastic Bowl team, and runs a school band; the band also runs an extension known as the Flag Corps, upon which athletic band members participate at sporting events.

Charleston Middle School also runs a variety of extracurricular activities, ranging from athletic teams such as softball, basketball, and cheerleading, to other activities, such as a newspaper, and a student council. The middle school's Scholastic Bowl team advanced as far as to achieve fourth place at the State competition in the year 2007 and went to regionals in 2016.

In the 2007–08 school year, students at Jefferson Middle School participated in a drive to send supplies to troops on the battlefront. The project, known as "Jefferson Elementary Thanking Soldiers" (or JETS) was organized and coordinated by a then-sixth grader named Carley Coffey, and grew to become a communitywide effort.
