= Coles County, Illinois =

County in Illinois, United States

- County
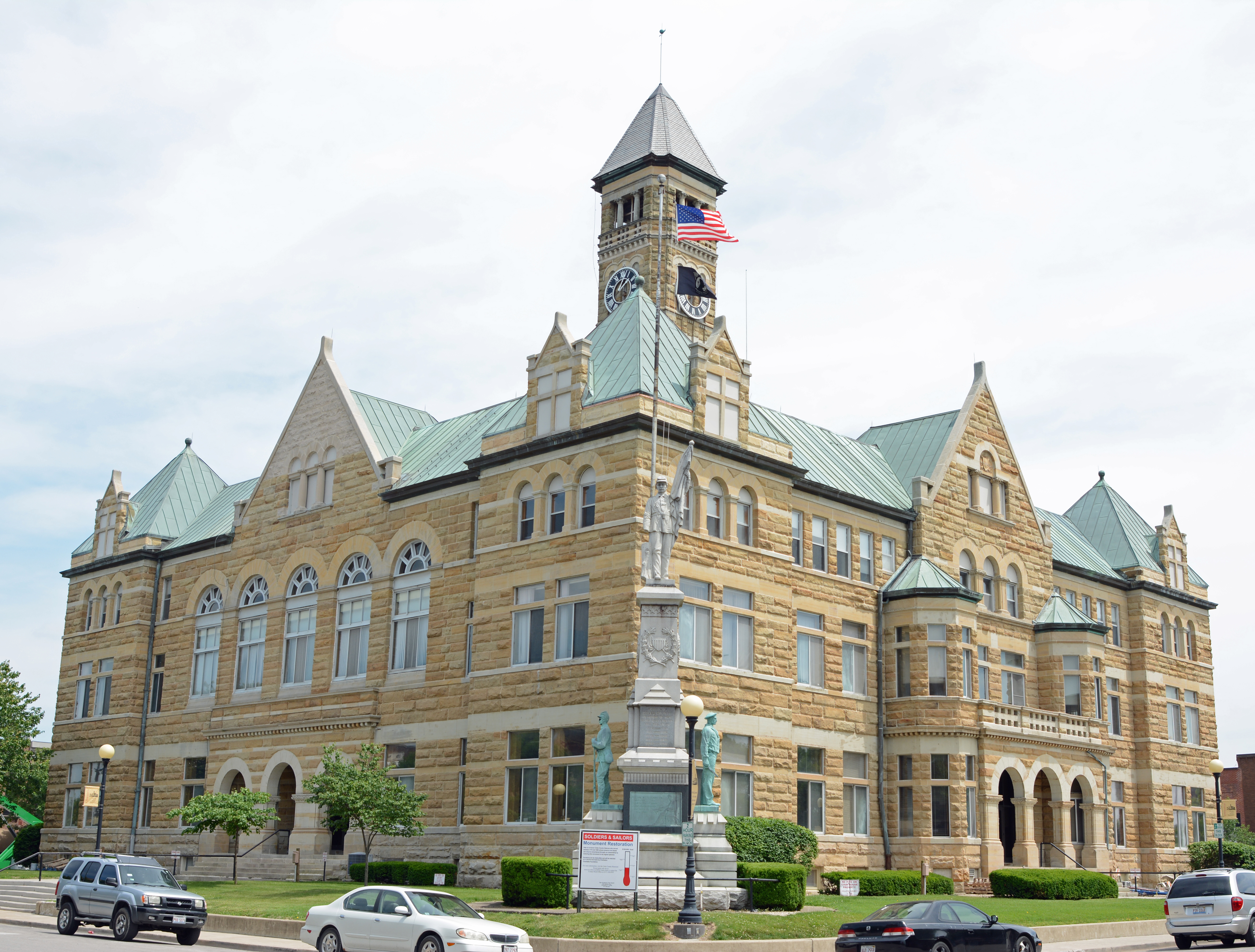
- Coles County Courthouse

- Location within the U.S. state of Illinois
- Coordinates: 39°31′N 88°13′W
- Country: United States
- State: Illinois
- Founded: Dec 25, 1830
- Named for: Edward Coles
- Seat: Charleston
- Largest city: Charleston

Area
  - Total: 510 sq mi (1,300 km^{2})
  - Land: 508 sq mi (1,320 km^{2})
  - Water: 1.8 sq mi (4.7 km^{2}) 0.4%

Population (2020)
  - Total: 46,863
  - Estimate (2025): 46,607 ▼
  - Density: 92.3/sq mi (35.6/km^{2})
- Time zone: UTC−6 (Central)
  - Summer (DST): UTC−5 (CDT)
- Congressional districts: 12th, 15th
- Website: www.colesco.illinois.gov

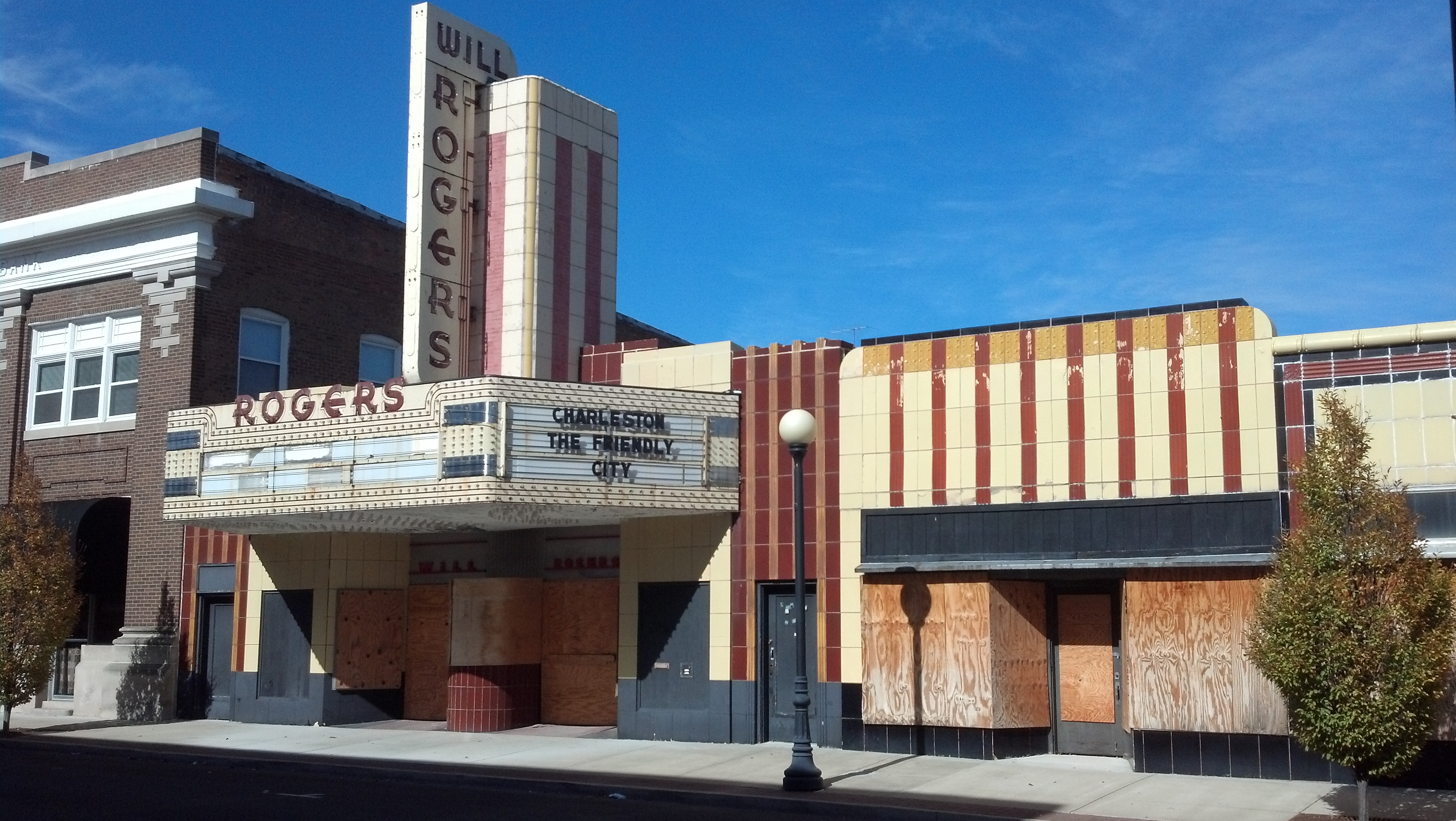
Will Rogers Theatre and Commercial Block

Coles County is a county in Illinois. As of the 2020 census, the population was 46,863. Its county seat is Charleston, which is also the home of Eastern Illinois University.

Coles County is coterminous with the Charleston–Mattoon, IL Micropolitan Statistical Area, as defined by the United States Census Bureau, which is an area consisting of Coles County, anchored by the cities of Charleston and Mattoon. The micropolitan area previously included Cumberland County, Illinois.

== History ==
Coles County was organized on December 25, 1830, from Clark and Edgar counties. It was named after Edward Coles, the second governor of Illinois, from 1822 to 1826. The majority of the American settlers who founded Coles County were either from the six New England states, or were born in upstate New York to parents who had moved to that region from New England shortly after the American Revolution. They were part of a wave of farmers who headed west into the frontier of the Northwest Territory during the early 1800s. The completion of the Erie Canal led to an increase in such migrants heading west. When these settlers originally reached what is today Coles County, they found dense virgin forest and prairie.

The New England settlers laid out farms, constructed roads, erected government buildings and established post routes. They brought with them many of their "Yankee" values, such as staunch support for abolitionism as well as a passion for education. They quickly established schools in their communities. They were mostly members of the Congregationalist Church, though some were Episcopalian. As a result of the second Great Awakening, many had become Baptists or switched to Protestant denominations such as Methodism or Presbyterianism before moving to what is now Coles County. The prevalence of settlers with New England heritage resulted in their establishing a culture that was continuous with that of New England for the first several decades of its history. As a result of this, county residents largely supported abolitionism in the antebellum period, and also the Republican Party as of the 1850s and 1860s.

Beginning in 1849, numerous German immigrants arrived in Coles County, refugees from the rebellions the year before in various principalities. This population overwhelmingly supported the abolition of slavery.

Irish Catholic immigrants who had fled the famine in their country also settled here. Illinois Democratic Senator Stephen Douglas was extremely popular amongst Irish Catholic immigrants in Coles County at this time. During the Civil War the Irish Catholic community of Coles County would overwhelmingly be Copperheads.

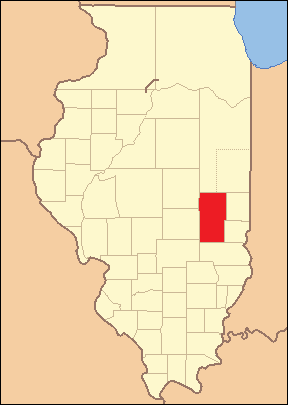
Coles County from the time of its creation to 1843

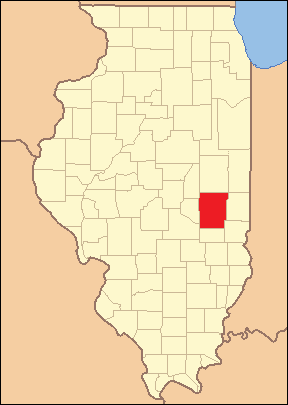
Coles County between 1843 and 1859

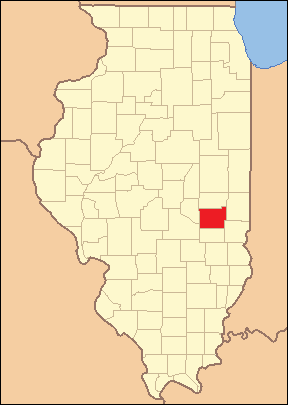
Coles County reduced to its current size in 1859 by the creation of Douglas County

== Folklore representation in other media ==
Coles County has generated several well-known legends and folktales, including the Mad Gasser of Mattoon and accounts of the ghost of Mary Hawkins at Pemberton Hall. Michael Kleen has compiled many of these tales, including the "witch's grave" of St. Omer Cemetery and the story of "Rag Doll Cemetery," in his book Tales of Coles County, Illinois (2010).

The legend of "Rag Doll Cemetery" was adapted for the screenplay of the independent film Rag Doll, filmed in 2010 primarily in and around Mattoon, Illinois. The novel A Family Possessed (2000) by L. W. Stevenson, is based on a rural family's account of poltergeist activity at their home in the 1980s.

Ashmore Estates has long been a part of local folklore. Originally serving as the almshouse at the Coles County Poor Farm, it is considered a haunted attraction and a place of interest for paranormal investigators.

== Geography ==
According to the U.S. Census Bureau, the county has a total area of 510 square miles (1,300 km^{2}), of which 508 square miles (1,320 km^{2}) is land and 1.8 square miles (4.7 km^{2}) (0.4%) is water.

=== Climate and weather ===
Charleston, Illinois

Climate chart (precipitation, max. and min. temperature)
J	F	M	A	M	J	J	A	S	O	N	D
2.2 35 19	2.4 41 24	3.4 53 33	4 65 43	4.2 75 52	3.9 85 61	4.7 88 65	3.5 86 63	3.2 79 56	3.3 68 45	3.9 53 34	3.2 40 24
- █ Average max. and min. temperatures in °F
- █ Precipitation totals in inches
- Source: The Weather Channel
Metric conversion
J	F	M	A	M	J	J	A	S	O	N	D
56 2 −7	61 5 −4	85 12 1	101 18 6	107 24 11	100 29 16	118 31 18	88 30 17	81 26 13	83 20 7	98 12 1	82 4 −4
- █ Average max. and min. temperatures in °C
- █ Precipitation totals in mm

In recent years, average temperatures in the county seat of Charleston have ranged from a low of 19 °F (−7 °C) in January to a high of 88 °F (31 °C) in July, although a record low of −27 °F (−33 °C) was recorded in January 1994 and a record high of 110 °F (43 °C) was recorded in July 1936. Average monthly precipitation ranged from 2.20 inches (56 mm) in January to 4.65 inches (118 mm) in July.

=== Adjacent counties ===
- Douglas County - north
- Edgar County - northeast
- Clark County - southeast
- Cumberland County - south
- Shelby County - southwest
- Moultrie County - west

=== Major highways ===
- Interstate 57
- US Route 45
- Illinois Route 16
- Illinois Route 49
- Illinois Route 121
- Illinois Route 130
- Illinois Route 133

=== Public transit ===
- Dial-A-Ride Rural Public Transportation
- Mattoon station

== Demographics ==
2000 census age pyramid for Coles County, skewed by Eastern Illinois University

Historical population
Census	Pop.	Note	%±
1840	9,616		—
1850	9,335		−2.9%
1860	14,203		52.1%
1870	25,235		77.7%
1880	27,042		7.2%
1890	30,093		11.3%
1900	34,146		13.5%
1910	34,517		1.1%
1920	35,108		1.7%
1930	37,315		6.3%
1940	38,470		3.1%
1950	40,328		4.8%
1960	42,860		6.3%
1970	47,815		11.6%
1980	52,260		9.3%
1990	51,644		−1.2%
2000	53,196		3.0%
2010	53,873		1.3%
2020	46,863		−13.0%
2025 (est.)	46,607	▼	−0.5%
U.S. Decennial Census; 1790-1960 1900-1990; 1990-2000 2010-2013

As of the 2000 census, the Charleston–Mattoon micropolitan area had a population of 64,449 (though a July 1, 2009 estimate placed the population at 62,781).

=== 2020 census ===
As of the 2020 census, the county had a population of 46,863. The median age was 38.8 years, with 19.5% of residents under the age of 18 and 19.0% aged 65 years or older. For every 100 females there were 94.2 males, and for every 100 females age 18 and over there were 91.6 males age 18 and over.

The racial makeup of the county was 87.1% White, 4.4% Black or African American, 0.2% American Indian and Alaska Native, 1.3% Asian, 0.1% Native Hawaiian and Pacific Islander, 1.9% from some other race, and 4.8% from two or more races. Hispanic or Latino residents of any race comprised 3.8% of the population.

Of the county's residents, 73.7% lived in urban areas while 26.3% lived in rural areas.

There were 19,861 households in the county, of which 25.0% had children under the age of 18 living in them. Of all households, 41.0% were married-couple households, 21.3% were households with a male householder and no spouse or partner present, and 29.8% were households with a female householder and no spouse or partner present. About 35.1% of all households were made up of individuals and 14.1% had someone living alone who was 65 years of age or older.

There were 22,739 housing units, of which 12.7% were vacant. Among occupied housing units, 61.1% were owner-occupied and 38.9% were renter-occupied. The homeowner vacancy rate was 2.7% and the rental vacancy rate was 12.5%.

=== Racial and ethnic composition ===
Coles County, Illinois – Racial and ethnic composition Note: the US Census treats Hispanic/Latino as an ethnic category. This table excludes Latinos from the racial categories and assigns them to a separate category. Hispanics/Latinos may be of any race.
Race / Ethnicity (NH = Non-Hispanic)	Pop 1980	Pop 1990	Pop 2000	Pop 2010	Pop 2020	% 1980	% 1990	% 2000	% 2010	% 2020
White alone (NH)	50,810	49,901	50,298	49,330	40,352	97.23%	96.62%	94.55%	91.57%	86.11%
Black or African American alone (NH)	871	910	1,208	2,022	2,043	1.67%	1.76%	2.27%	3.75%	4.36%
Native American or Alaska Native alone (NH)	43	75	93	79	82	0.08%	0.15%	0.17%	0.15%	0.17%
Asian alone (NH)	192	334	413	523	617	0.37%	0.65%	0.78%	0.97%	1.32%
Native Hawaiian or Pacific Islander alone (NH)	x	x	21	10	24	x	x	0.04%	0.02%	0.05%
Other race alone (NH)	108	19	34	37	211	0.21%	0.04%	0.06%	0.07%	0.45%
Mixed race or Multiracial (NH)	x	x	392	717	1,766	x	x	0.74%	1.33%	3.77%
Hispanic or Latino (any race)	236	405	737	1,155	1,768	0.45%	0.78%	1.39%	2.14%	3.77%
Total	52,260	51,644	53,196	53,873	46,863	100.00%	100.00%	100.00%	100.00%	100.00%

=== 2010 census ===
As of the 2010 United States census, there were 53,873 people, 21,463 households, and 11,963 families residing in the county. The population density was 106.0 inhabitants per square mile (40.9/km^{2}). There were 23,425 housing units at an average density of 46.1 per square mile (17.8/km^{2}). The racial makeup of the county was 92.9% white, 3.8% black or African American, 1.0% Asian, 0.2% American Indian, 0.6% from other races, and 1.5% from two or more races. Those of Hispanic or Latino origin made up 2.1% of the population. In terms of ancestry, 25.6% were German, 16.4% were Irish, 11.1% were American, 10.0% were English, 3.4% were Polish, 2.9% were Italian, 2.5% were French, 2.1% were Dutch and 1.9% were Scots-Irish.

Of the 21,463 households, 25.5% had children under the age of 18 living with them, 41.8% were married couples living together, 9.9% had a female householder with no husband present, 44.3% were non-families, and 31.4% of all households were made up of individuals. The average household size was 2.30 and the average family size was 2.87. The median age was 31.6 years.

The median income for a household in the county was $36,457 and the median income for a family was $54,170. Males had a median income of $38,915 versus $28,781 for females. The per capita income for the county was $20,601. About 10.6% of families and 20.3% of the population were below the poverty line, including 20.6% of those under age 18 and 5.9% of those age 65 or over.

== Communities ==
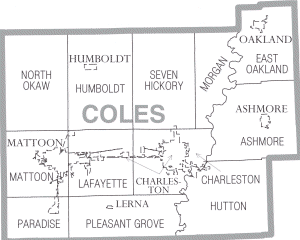
Township and municipality map of Coles County.

=== Cities ===
- Charleston (seat)
- Mattoon
- Oakland

=== Villages ===
- Ashmore
- Humboldt
- Lerna

=== Census-designated places ===
- Janesville
- Trilla

=== Unincorporated communities ===
- Bushton
- Campbell
- Coles
- Cooks Mills
- Diona
- Dorans
- Embarrass
- Etna
- Fairgrange
- Fuller
- Hutton
- Jones
- Loxa
- Magnet
- Paradise
- Rardin
- Wabash Point

=== Townships ===
Coles County is divided into these twelve townships:

- Ashmore
- Charleston
- East Oakland
- Humboldt
- Hutton
- Lafayette
- Mattoon
- Morgan
- North Okaw
- Paradise
- Pleasant Grove
- Seven Hickory

== Education ==
Tertiary:

- Eastern Illinois University
- Lake Land College
- Lakeview College of Nursing (Charleston)

School districts in the county include:

- Arcola Consolidated Unit School District 306
- Arthur Community Unit School District 305
- Casey-Westfield Community Unit School District 4C
- Charleston Community Unit School District 1
- Kansas Community Unit School District 3
- Mattoon Community Unit School District 2
- Oakland Community Unit School District 5
- Sullivan Community Unit School District 300

== Politics ==
Coles County leans strongly towards the Republican Party in presidential elections. Although it was carried by Illinoisian Barack Obama in 2008, the GOP regained the county in 2012 and all subsequent presidential elections.

United States presidential election results for Coles County, Illinois
Year	Republican		Democratic		Third party(ies)	
Year	No.	%	No.	%	No.	%
1892	3,693	48.57%	3,611	47.49%	300	3.95%
1896	4,534	52.52%	3,982	46.13%	117	1.36%
1900	4,706	53.61%	3,921	44.66%	152	1.73%
1904	4,901	55.52%	3,435	38.91%	492	5.57%
1908	4,388	50.83%	3,957	45.84%	287	3.32%
1912	2,263	26.86%	3,453	40.98%	2,710	32.16%
1916	8,314	50.83%	7,772	47.51%	271	1.66%
1920	8,563	58.76%	5,811	39.87%	200	1.37%
1924	8,342	54.90%	5,544	36.49%	1,308	8.61%
1928	11,479	69.12%	5,071	30.54%	57	0.34%
1932	7,313	39.40%	11,081	59.71%	165	0.89%
1936	8,800	42.17%	11,931	57.17%	137	0.66%
1940	10,528	47.82%	11,409	51.83%	77	0.35%
1944	9,473	51.31%	8,936	48.40%	54	0.29%
1948	8,638	50.56%	8,393	49.13%	53	0.31%
1952	12,660	61.59%	7,876	38.31%	20	0.10%
1956	12,436	62.13%	7,569	37.82%	10	0.05%
1960	12,166	58.45%	8,629	41.46%	19	0.09%
1964	8,878	43.83%	11,377	56.17%	0	0.00%
1968	10,449	52.86%	7,337	37.12%	1,980	10.02%
1972	13,681	62.90%	7,988	36.72%	82	0.38%
1976	11,021	54.66%	8,639	42.85%	502	2.49%
1980	11,994	58.02%	6,743	32.62%	1,934	9.36%
1984	14,044	65.95%	7,156	33.60%	95	0.45%
1988	11,043	56.62%	8,327	42.69%	134	0.69%
1992	8,098	36.31%	9,402	42.16%	4,800	21.52%
1996	8,038	41.65%	8,950	46.38%	2,310	11.97%
2000	10,495	52.23%	8,904	44.31%	694	3.45%
2004	13,015	57.13%	9,566	41.99%	199	0.87%
2008	10,978	47.42%	11,716	50.60%	459	1.98%
2012	11,631	54.26%	9,262	43.21%	544	2.54%
2016	13,003	59.33%	7,309	33.35%	1,606	7.33%
2020	14,037	61.92%	8,067	35.59%	564	2.49%
2024	13,606	62.95%	7,495	34.68%	512	2.37%

== Notable people ==
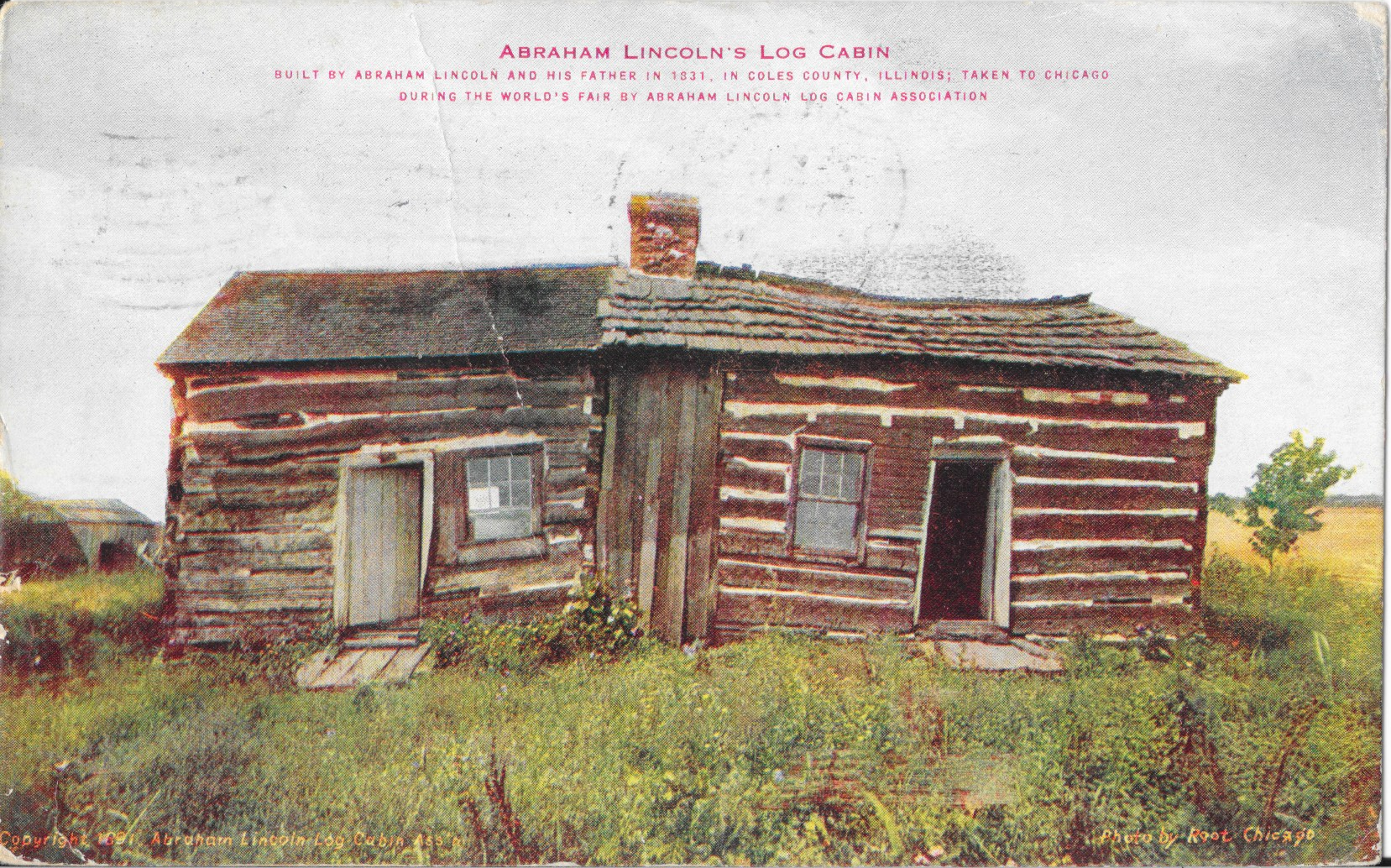
Lincoln cabin circa 1891 in Coles County

- Thomas Lincoln, father of President Abraham Lincoln, moved to Coles County in 1831 and died there in 1851.

== See also ==
- National Register of Historic Places listings in Coles County, Illinois
- List of school districts in Illinois
- Coles Together, economic development organization
- Donica Creek, a stream in Coles county
