= Davenport House =

Davenport House may refer to:

== United Kingdom ==
- Davenport House, Duntisbourne Abbots, Gloucestershire, England
- Davenport House, Worfield, Shropshire, England

== United States ==
- Davenport House (Franklin Township, Michigan)
- Davenport House (New Rochelle, New York)
- Davenport House (Creswell, North Carolina)
- Davenport House (Greer, South Carolina)
- Hanford Davenport House, New Canaan, Connecticut
- Deacon John Davenport House, Stamford, Connecticut
- Isaiah Davenport House, Savannah, Georgia
- Davenport-Bradfield House, Sheridan, Indiana
- Lispenard-Rodman-Davenport House, New Rochelle, New York
