= Lake Charleston (Illinois) =

- Location within Illinois Location within the United States
- Location: Coles County, Illinois
- Coordinates: 39.4667903°N 88.1457023°W
- Type: reservoir

Lake Charleston is a reservoir in Coles County, Illinois. Served by Illinois Route 130, it is 2 miles (3 km) southeast of the Illinois city of Charleston. Much of the lake is surrounded by city parkland, and a lakeside circular trail is 3.6 miles (6.0 km) in length. Power boats are allowed, but the lake enforces a no-wake rule. There is a fishing pier.

The lake is located in Charleston Township and the adjacent Hutton Township. The reservoir is fed by the adjacent Embarras River, which was dammed by engineers to create the reservoir. The reservoir is served by Exit 119 on Interstate 70 in nearby Cumberland County.

Native Americans lived in the Charleston Area for thousands of years before it was settled. Between 1815 and 1820 the natives in the area and the Land Surveyors began to have altercations since the tensions were already heightened from the War of 1812. Just down the road in Fox Ridge State Park were the Piankeshaw tribes hunting grounds. In early 1895 Charleston constructed a reservoir, fed by the Embarras river, as the town’s water supply. In 1947 the city began to create a bigger reservoir that led to the Lake’s formation, this was to supply the town's growing water needs.

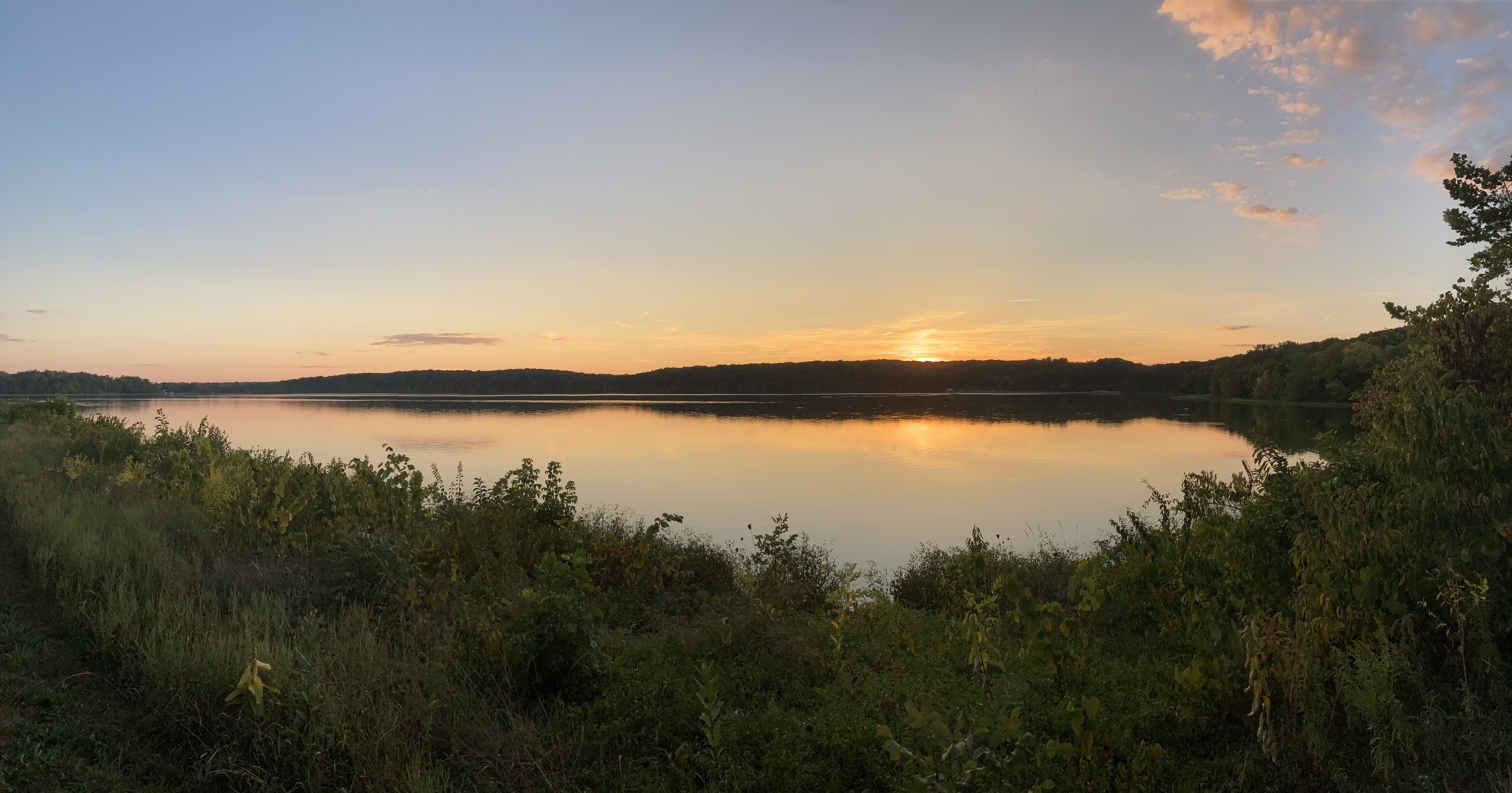
Looking west from the levee at sunset; Lake Charleston

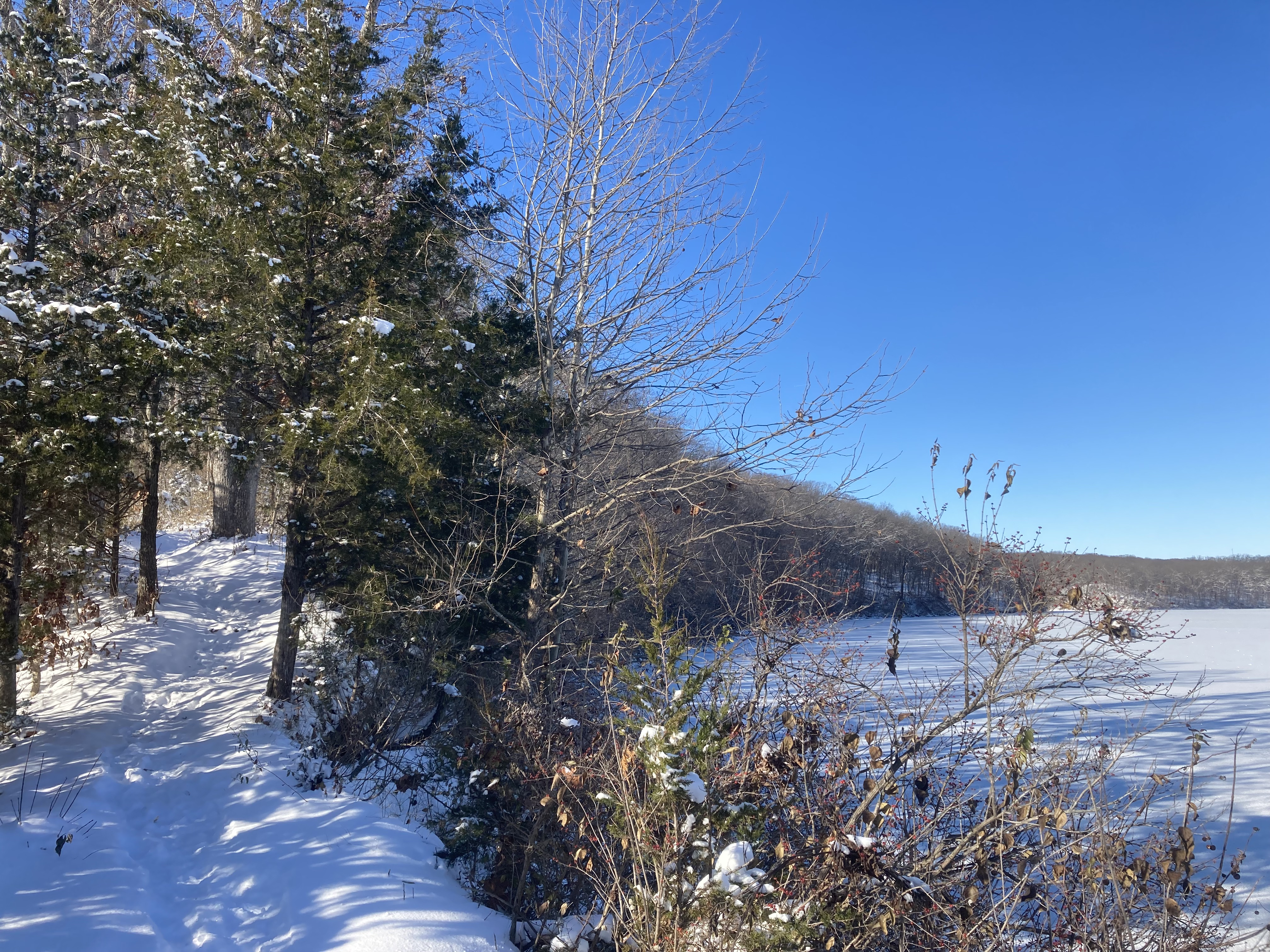
West side hiking trails in December
