= Five Mile House =

Five Mile House may refer to:

- Five Mile House, Duntisbourne Abbots
- Five Mile House railway station
- Five Mile House (Illinois)
- Five Mile House Mill, Runham
