= Fox Ridge =

Fox Ridge may refer to:

- Fox Ridge, Maryland
- Fox Ridge, South Dakota
- Fox Ridge State Park in Illinois
