= Lee Lynch =

Lee Lynch may refer to:

- Lee Lynch (author), American author
- Lee Lynch (footballer), Irish football (soccer) player
- Lee Lynch (Illinois politician), American politician
