= Mary Josephine Booth =

Mary Booth in her World War I uniform

Mary Josephine Booth (1876–1965) headed the library at Eastern Illinois University for 41 years, from 1904 to 1945. Booth was the third University Librarian, following Ella F. Corwin (1899–1900) and Florence M. Beck (1900–1904).

== Service in World War I ==
On November 27, 1917, Miss Booth arrived in France as a volunteer to serve with the American Red Cross. In May, 1918, she transferred to work with the American Library Association. While working with the ALA, Booth classified the library in General Pershing's headquarters at Chaumont. In Germany, she took charge of the library in the Festhalle in Koblenz. Booth was the only EIU faculty member to serve overseas during World War I. She paid for all of her expenses while serving as a volunteer. On July 17, 1919, Booth returned to the United States.

== Professional library work ==
Booth was an active member of both the American Library Association and the Illinois Library Association, serving a term as president of the Illinois Library Association. She was widely known to librarians of her time from her 1914 publication "Material on Geography Which May Be Obtained Free or at Small Cost." Six editions for this work were produced between 1914 and 1931. For many years, Miss Booth worked to secure funding for a free-standing library building that would allow the Library to move out of its crowded location in Old Main. She succeeded in getting approval for the new building in 1942.

== Booth Library building ==
Booth retired from Eastern Illinois University in 1945, five years before the library building named in her honor was completed. Booth helped lay the cornerstone for the building and cut the ribbon at the grand opening ceremony in 1950. A portrait of Mary Booth painted by Mattoon, Illinois artist Sophia Talbot hangs in the Marvin Foyer at the north end of Booth Library.
