= Doudna =

Doudna is a surname. Notable people with the surname include:

- Jennifer Doudna (born 1964), American biochemist
- Quincy Doudna (1907–1987), American university administrator
