= The Daily Eastern News =

Student newspaper published at Eastern Illinois University

- "Tell the truth and don't be afraid"
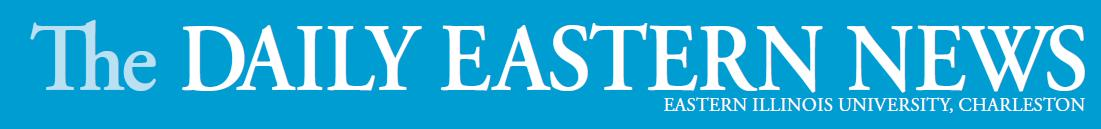

- Front page of the 100th anniversary issue
- Type: Student newspaper
- Format: Tabloid
- School: Eastern Illinois University
- Launched: Nov. 5, 1915
- Language: English
- Headquarters: Buzzard Hall
- City: Charleston, Illinois
- Country: United States
- Circulation: 4,000+
- Website: dailyeasternnews.com
- Free online archives: issuu.com/dailyeasternnews

The Daily Eastern News is the student-run newspaper published on the grounds of Eastern Illinois University serving the campus and community of Charleston, Illinois. The newspaper was founded on Nov. 5, 1915 and publishes on weekdays during the school year and online-only in the summer. It currently has a daily circulation of over 4,000.

The newspaper includes news, sports, features, opinions and special sections, as well as the weekly entertainment section "The Verge."

The paper's editorial, production, and advertising staff are composed entirely of students from a range of degree programs.

The Daily Eastern News is printed adjacent to the newsroom on the university's Goss printing press. Eastern Illinois University is one of only three universities in the United States to run its own newspaper printing press and is one of the smallest universities in the country to have a daily newspaper.

The newspaper was founded on Nov. 5, 1915, as the Normal School News, as the university was then known as Eastern Illinois State Normal School. The paper was renamed Teacher's College News and Eastern State News before its current name was chosen in 1980.

Notable alumni of the newspaper include Bloomberg Businessweek reporter Cam Simpson, Associated Press national editor Chris Sundheim, and several Pulitzer Prize winners.

The DEN is one of the more prestigious student run newspapers in the country. In 2023 and 2024 they were named Best College Media Group of the year by College Media Association. The DEN has at least 50 awards in 2023 from CMA Pinnacle national awards and Illinois College Press Association competition.

== See also ==
- List of college and university student newspapers in the United States
