= Will Rogers Theatre and Commercial Block =

- U.S. National Register of Historic Places
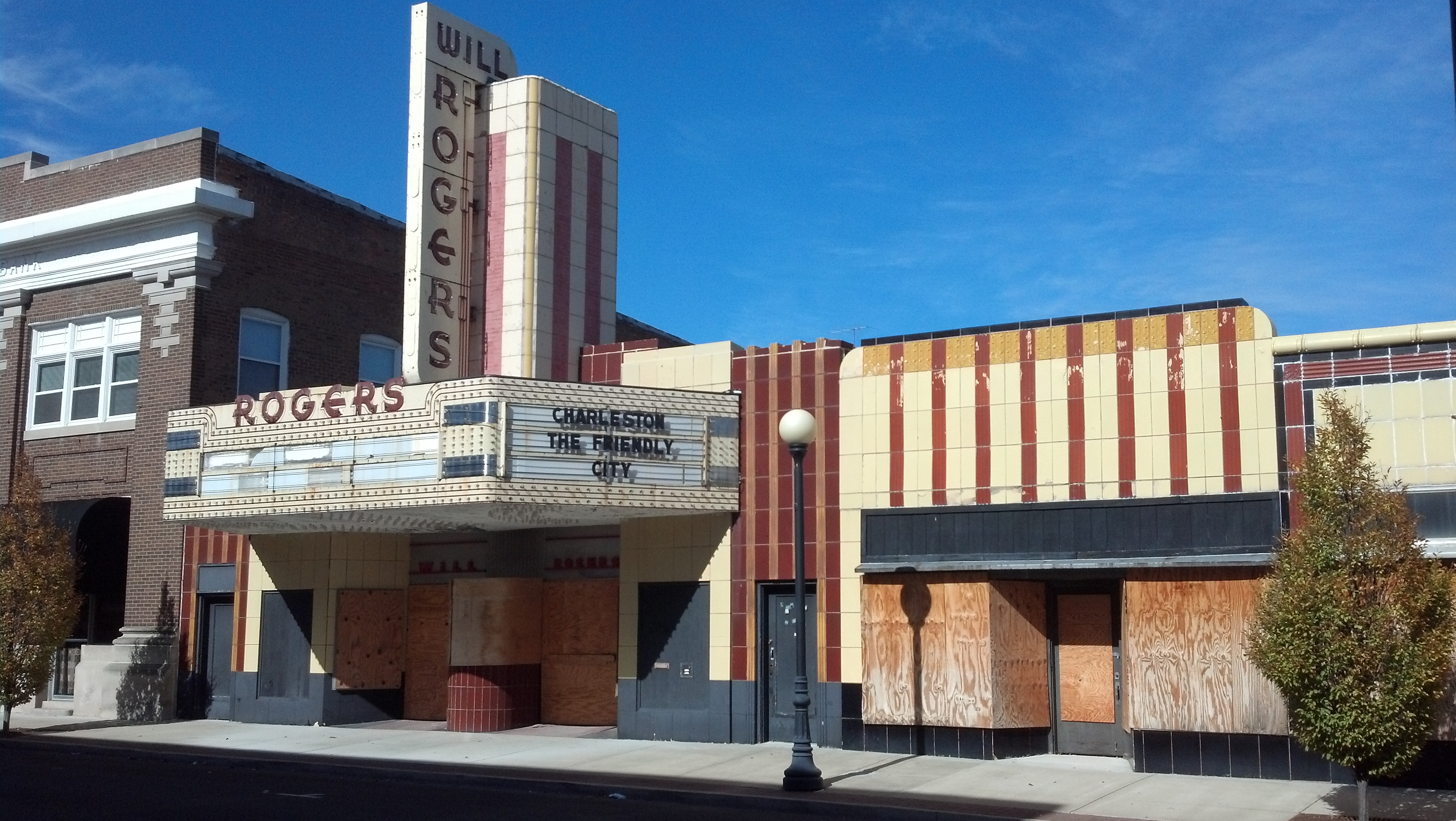

- Location within Illinois Location within the United States
- Location: 705-715 Monroe Ave., Charleston, Illinois
- Coordinates: 39°29′43″N 88°10′28″W
- Area: 0.4 acres (0.16 ha)
- Built: 1935
- Architectural style: Art Deco
- NRHP reference No.: 84001066
- Added to NRHP: January 12, 1984

The Will Rogers Theatre and Commercial Block is a historic theatre and commercial building located at 705-715 Monroe Avenue in Charleston, Illinois. The theatre, named for entertainer Will Rogers, was built in 1935 and opened in 1938. The Art Deco building was the first Art Deco structure in Charleston and is the only existing Art Deco commercial building in Coles County and the six counties it borders. The front facade of the building is decorated with colored terra cotta tiles which form yellow, red, and black stripes. The theatre has a tall tower over its entrance which supports the top of its neon marquee. The interior decorations, which also have an Art Deco influence, include recessed lighting and flowered and geometric patterns painted on the ceiling by hand.

The building was added to the National Register of Historic Places on January 12, 1984.
