= Duntisbourne Abbots =

Coordinates: 51.76919°N 2.04365°W

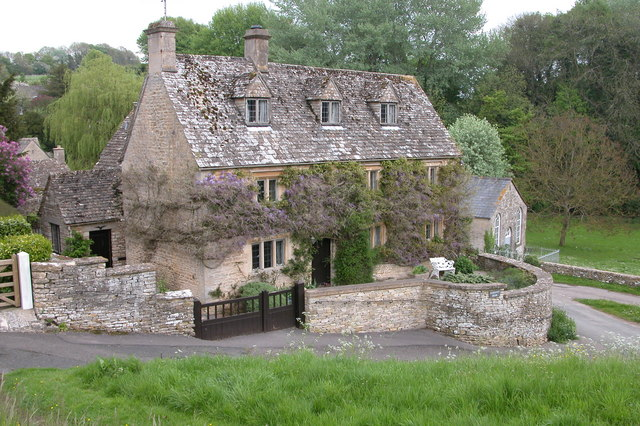
- Davenport House, situated near St Peter's Church

- Location within Gloucestershire
- Population: 225 (2011)
- OS grid reference: SO970078
- Civil parish: The Dunstibournes
- District: Cotswold
- Shire county: Gloucestershire
- Region: South West
- Country: England
- Sovereign state: United Kingdom
- Post town: CIRENCESTER
- Postcode district: GL7
- Dialling code: 01285
- Police: Gloucestershire
- Fire: Gloucestershire
- Ambulance: South Western
- UK Parliament: North Cotswolds

Duntisbourne Abbots is a village and civil parish located in the English county of Gloucestershire. Duntisbourne Abbots forms part of the Cotswold District.

The Five Mile House is a 17th-century Grade II listed public house at Old Gloucester Road. It is on the Campaign for Real Ale's National Inventory of Historic Pub Interiors.

St Peter's Church in the village was built in the 12th century, on the site of an earlier, Saxon, church. Its tower dates from Norman times, and has belfry lights of pierced stone lattice work that date from the 13th century. Inside the church, the font also dates from Norman times, while the unusual chancel arch dates from an extensive Victorian restoration.

It also features in the title of μ-Ziq's 2007 album Duntisbourne Abbots Soulmate Devastation Technique.

== See also ==
- Davenport House
