= Charleston, Illinois =

- City
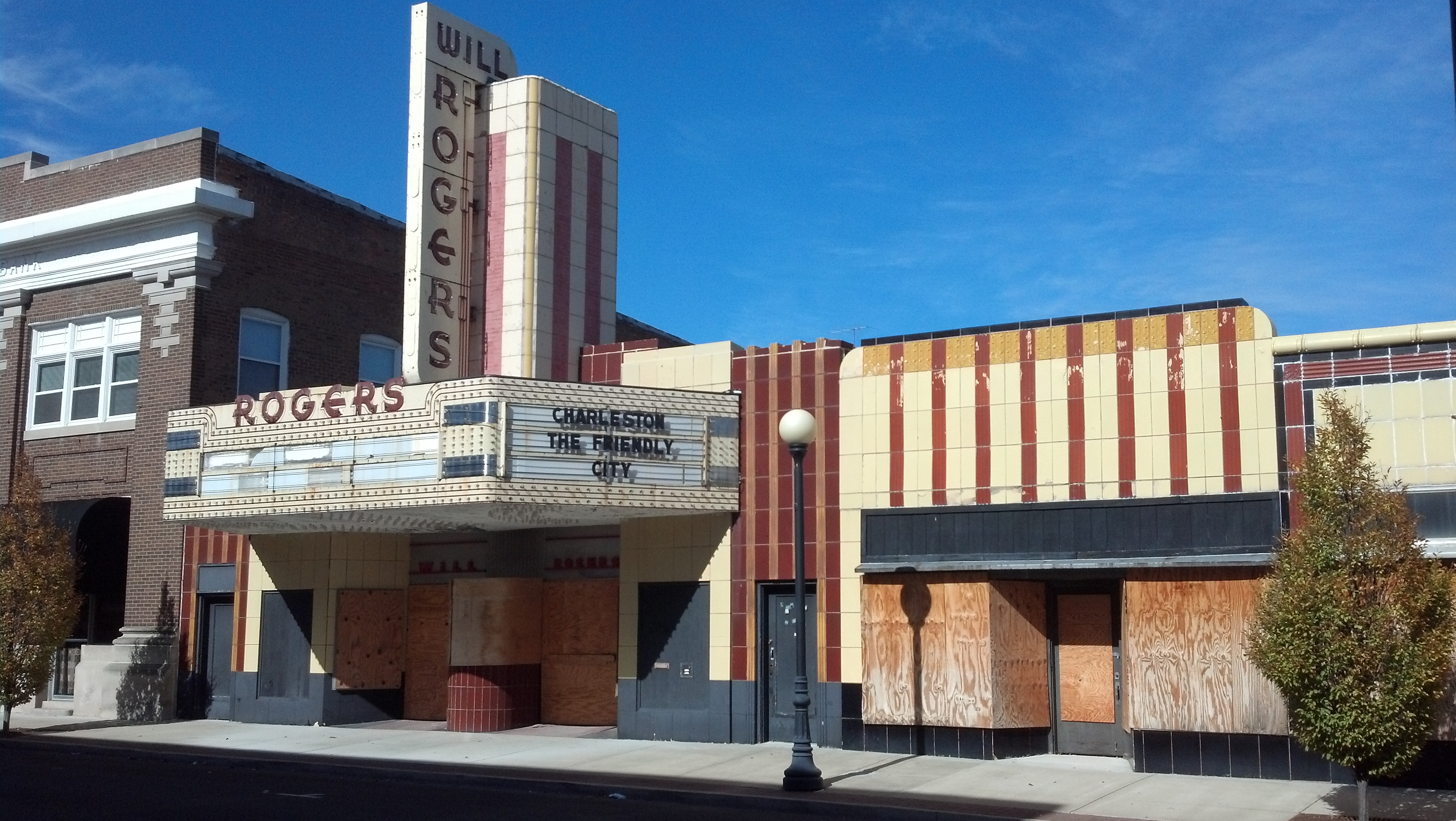
- Will Rogers Theatre and Commercial Block

- Flag Seal
- Nickname: Chucktown
- Interactive map of Charleston, Illinois
- Location within Illinois Location within the United States
- Coordinates: 39°29′03″N 88°10′41″W
- Country: United States
- State: Illinois
- County: Coles
- Townships: Charleston, Hutton, Lafayette, Seven Hickory
- Founded: 1831
- Incorporation: 1865
- Founder: Benjamin Parker
- Named for: Charles Morton - Postmaster

Government
  - Type: Mayor-council government
  - Mayor: Brandon Combs

Area
  - Total: 9.59 sq mi (24.83 km^{2})
  - Land: 8.88 sq mi (23.01 km^{2})
  - Water: 0.70 sq mi (1.82 km^{2})
- Elevation: 699 ft (213 m)

Population (2020)
  - Total: 17,286
  - Density: 1,945.7/sq mi (751.23/km^{2})
- Time zone: UTC−6 (CST)
  - Summer (DST): UTC−5 (CDT)
- ZIP code: 61920
- Area codes: 217, 447
- FIPS code: 17-12567
- GNIS ID: 2393803
- Website: www.charlestonillinois.org

Charleston is a city in and the county seat of Coles County, Illinois, United States. The population was 17,286, as of the 2020 census. The city is home to Eastern Illinois University and has close ties with its neighbor, Mattoon. Both are principal cities of the Charleston–Mattoon Micropolitan Statistical Area.

== History ==
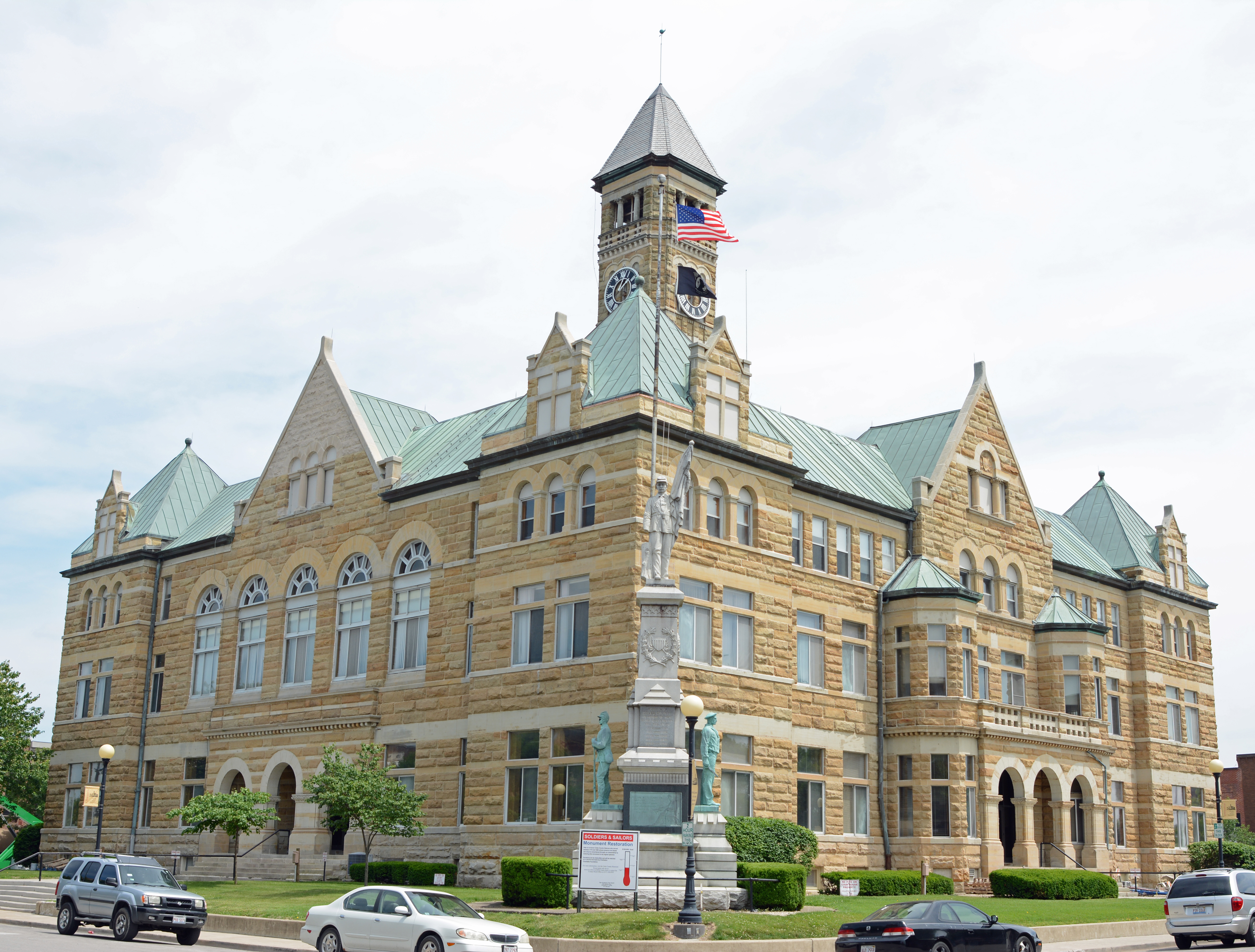
Coles County courthouse

Native Americans lived in the Charleston area for thousands of years before the first European settlers arrived. With the great tallgrass prairie to the west, beech-maple forests to the east, and the Embarras River and Wabash Rivers between, the Charleston area provided semi-nomadic Indians access to a variety of resources. Indians may have deliberately set the "wildfires" which maintained the local mosaic of prairie and oak–hickory forest. Streams with names such as 'Indian Creek' and 'Kickapoo Creek' mark the sites of former Indian settlements. One village is said to have been located south of Fox Ridge State Park near a deposit of flint.

The early history of settlement in the area was marked by uneasy co-existence between Indians and European settlers. Some settlers lived peacefully with the natives, but conflict arose in the 1810s and 1820s. After Indians allegedly harassed surveying crews, an escalating series of poorly documented skirmishes occurred between Indians, settlers, and the Illinois Rangers. Two pitched battles (complete with cannon on one side) took place just south of Charleston along "the hills of the Embarrass," near the entrance to Lake Charleston park. These conflicts did not slow American settlement, and Indian history in Coles County effectively ended when all natives were expelled by law from Illinois after the 1832 Black Hawk War. With the grudging exception of Indian wives, the last natives were driven out by the 1840s.

First settled by Benjamin Parker in 1826, Charleston was named for Charles Morton, its first postmaster. The city was established in 1831, but not incorporated until 1865. When Abraham Lincoln's father moved to a farm on Goosenest Prairie south of Charleston in 1831, Lincoln helped him move, then left to start his own homestead at New Salem in Sangamon County. Lincoln was a frequent visitor to the Charleston area, though he likely spent more time at the Coles County courthouse than at the home of his father and stepmother. One of the famous Lincoln–Douglas debates was held in Charleston on September 18, 1858, and is now the site of the Coles County fairgrounds and a small museum. Lincoln's last visit was in 1859, when the future President visited his stepmother and his father's grave.

Although Illinois was a solidly pro-Union, anti-slavery state, Coles County was settled by many Southerners with pro-slavery sentiments. In 1847, the county was divided when prominent local citizens offered refuge to a family of escaped slaves brought from Kentucky by Gen. Robert Matson. Lincoln, by then a young railroad lawyer, appeared in the Coles County Courthouse to argue for the return of the escaped slaves under the Fugitive Slave Act in a case known as Matson v. Ashmore.

At the height of the American Civil War, violence broke out in downtown Charleston on March 28, 1864, developing into the Charleston riot. Six Union soldiers, two Copperheads, and one bystander were killed, ultimately drawing the attention of President Lincoln and newspapers across the country.

In 1895, the Eastern Illinois State Normal School was established in Charleston, which later became Eastern Illinois University. This led to lasting resentment in nearby Mattoon, which had originally led the campaign to locate the proposed teaching school in Coles County. The Mattoon Gazette announced the decision with the derisive headline "Charleston Gets It: The New Reform School Located at Catfishville."

Thomas Lincoln's log cabin has been restored and is open to the public as the Lincoln Log Cabin State Historic Site, 8 mi. south of Charleston. The Lincoln farm is maintained as a living history museum where historical re-enactors depict life in 1840s Illinois. Thomas and Sarah Bush Lincoln are buried in the nearby Shiloh Cemetery.

On May 26, 1917, a tornado ripped through Charleston, killing 38 people and injuring many more, along with destroying 220 homes. On June 17, 2026, an Enhanced Fujita scale-2 tornado hit the north side of Charleston, resulting in significant damage, including downed trees and power lines, as well as damage to houses and vehicles.

== Geography ==
According to the 2021 census gazetteer files, Charleston has a total area of 9.59 square miles (24.84 km^{2}), of which 8.88 square miles (23.00 km^{2}) (or 92.68%) is land and 0.70 square miles (1.81 km^{2}) (or 7.32%) is water.

=== Climate ===
The data below were taken from 1893 through January 2020, when this chart was made. They were accessed through the Western Regional Climate Center (WRCC).

Climate data for Charleston, Illinois (1991–2020 normals, extremes 1896–present)
Month	Jan	Feb	Mar	Apr	May	Jun	Jul	Aug	Sep	Oct	Nov	Dec	Year
Record high °F (°C)	71 (22)	75 (24)	89 (32)	92 (33)	101 (38)	108 (42)	110 (43)	107 (42)	104 (40)	94 (34)	84 (29)	73 (23)	110 (43)
Mean daily maximum °F (°C)	37.9 (3.3)	43.3 (6.3)	54.3 (12.4)	67.3 (19.6)	77.1 (25.1)	85.5 (29.7)	88.1 (31.2)	86.6 (30.3)	81.2 (27.3)	68.9 (20.5)	54.4 (12.4)	42.4 (5.8)	65.6 (18.7)
Daily mean °F (°C)	29.3 (−1.5)	33.9 (1.1)	44.0 (6.7)	55.7 (13.2)	65.6 (18.7)	74.2 (23.4)	77.2 (25.1)	75.5 (24.2)	69.0 (20.6)	57.3 (14.1)	44.6 (7.0)	34.3 (1.3)	55.0 (12.8)
Mean daily minimum °F (°C)	20.7 (−6.3)	24.6 (−4.1)	33.6 (0.9)	44.1 (6.7)	54.1 (12.3)	63.0 (17.2)	66.2 (19.0)	64.4 (18.0)	56.8 (13.8)	45.6 (7.6)	34.9 (1.6)	26.1 (−3.3)	44.5 (6.9)
Record low °F (°C)	−27 (−33)	−23 (−31)	−14 (−26)	14 (−10)	26 (−3)	35 (2)	45 (7)	39 (4)	25 (−4)	11 (−12)	−2 (−19)	−20 (−29)	−27 (−33)
Average precipitation inches (mm)	2.54 (65)	2.69 (68)	3.11 (79)	5.09 (129)	4.52 (115)	4.84 (123)	4.40 (112)	2.94 (75)	3.15 (80)	3.94 (100)	3.74 (95)	2.79 (71)	43.75 (1,111)
Average snowfall inches (cm)	8.1 (21)	5.5 (14)	1.3 (3.3)	0.3 (0.76)	0.0 (0.0)	0.0 (0.0)	0.0 (0.0)	0.0 (0.0)	0.0 (0.0)	0.0 (0.0)	0.8 (2.0)	3.0 (7.6)	19.0 (48)
Average precipitation days (≥ 0.01 in)	10.2	8.3	10.7	12.0	12.9	10.4	9.2	8.1	7.8	9.5	10.4	10.6	120.2
Average snowy days (≥ 0.1 in)	4.1	2.6	1.4	0.1	0.0	0.0	0.0	0.0	0.0	0.0	0.5	3.2	11.9
Source: NOAA

== Demographics ==
Historical population
Census	Pop.	Note	%±
1850	849		—
1870	2,849		—
1880	2,867		0.6%
1890	4,135		44.2%
1900	5,488		32.7%
1910	5,884		7.2%
1920	6,615		12.4%
1930	8,012		21.1%
1940	8,197		2.3%
1950	9,164		11.8%
1960	10,505		14.6%
1970	16,421		56.3%
1980	19,355		17.9%
1990	20,398		5.4%
2000	21,039		3.1%
2010	21,838		3.8%
2020	17,286		−20.8%
U.S. Decennial Census

=== 2020 census ===
As of the 2020 census, Charleston had a population of 17,286. The median age was 30.9 years. 17.2% of residents were under the age of 18 and 14.9% of residents were 65 years of age or older. For every 100 females there were 91.4 males, and for every 100 females age 18 and over there were 88.4 males age 18 and over.

99.4% of residents lived in urban areas, while 0.6% lived in rural areas.

There were 7,012 households and 3,850 families in Charleston, of which 23.0% had children under the age of 18 living in them. Of all households, 31.3% were married-couple households, 24.6% were households with a male householder and no spouse or partner present, and 35.7% were households with a female householder and no spouse or partner present. About 40.4% of all households were made up of individuals and 12.7% had someone living alone who was 65 years of age or older.

There were 8,319 housing units, of which 15.7% were vacant. The homeowner vacancy rate was 3.4% and the rental vacancy rate was 13.2%.

Racial composition as of the 2020 census
Race	Number	Percent
White	13,769	79.7%
Black or African American	1,451	8.4%
American Indian and Alaska Native	46	0.3%
Asian	439	2.5%
Native Hawaiian and Other Pacific Islander	23	0.1%
Some other race	671	3.9%
Two or more races	887	5.1%
Hispanic or Latino (of any race)	1,010	5.8%

== Economy ==
Charleston is home to Eastern Illinois University, which has roughly 8,100 undergraduate and graduate students. Additionally, Eastern Illinois hosts the Illinois High School Association's Girls Badminton, Journalism, and Girls and Boys Track and Field State Finals.

The establishment of an enterprise zone on the northern edge of Charleston has helped attract some manufacturing and industrial jobs, including Vesuvius USA, ITW Hi-Cone, and Dietzgen Corporation.

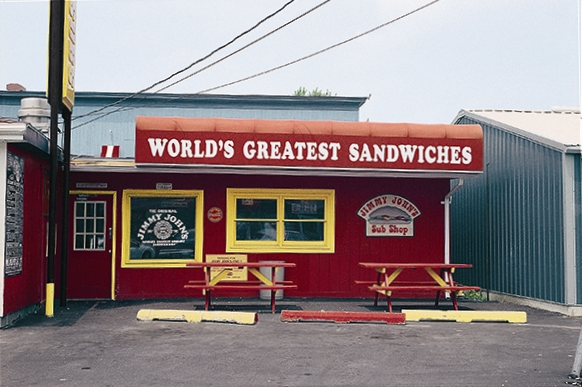
Original Jimmy John's Shop

Jimmy John Liautaud founded the first Jimmy John's restaurant in Charleston in 1983, occupying premises near the corner of Fourth Street and Lincoln Avenue.

== Arts and Culture ==
Charleston is home to the annual Coles County Fair, which typically runs for a week in the summer. The fair includes animal showings, carnival rides and attractions, a demolition derby, and more. The fair is held at the fairgrounds located at 603 W Madison Ave.

=== Museums and Libraries ===
- Charleston Carnegie Public Library
- EIU Tarble Arts Center
- Doudna Fine Arts Center
- Lincoln Douglas Debate Museum
- Five Mile House
- Booth Library

== Parks and Recreation ==
Charleston has seven parks (one of which is a state park) and six trails, only one of which is not part of Lake Charleston (the Lincoln Prairie Grass Trail).

=== Lake Charleston ===
Lake Charleston lies approximately two miles (3 km) southeast of the city center. It covers 330 acres of surface area, and has a maximum depth of 12 feet (3.7 m) and average depth of 5.7 feet (1.7 m). Fishing and boating are allowed, although there is a no-wake regulation. There are five trails in the park area around the lake, with the longest trail looping around the lake with a length of 3.6 miles (5.8 km).

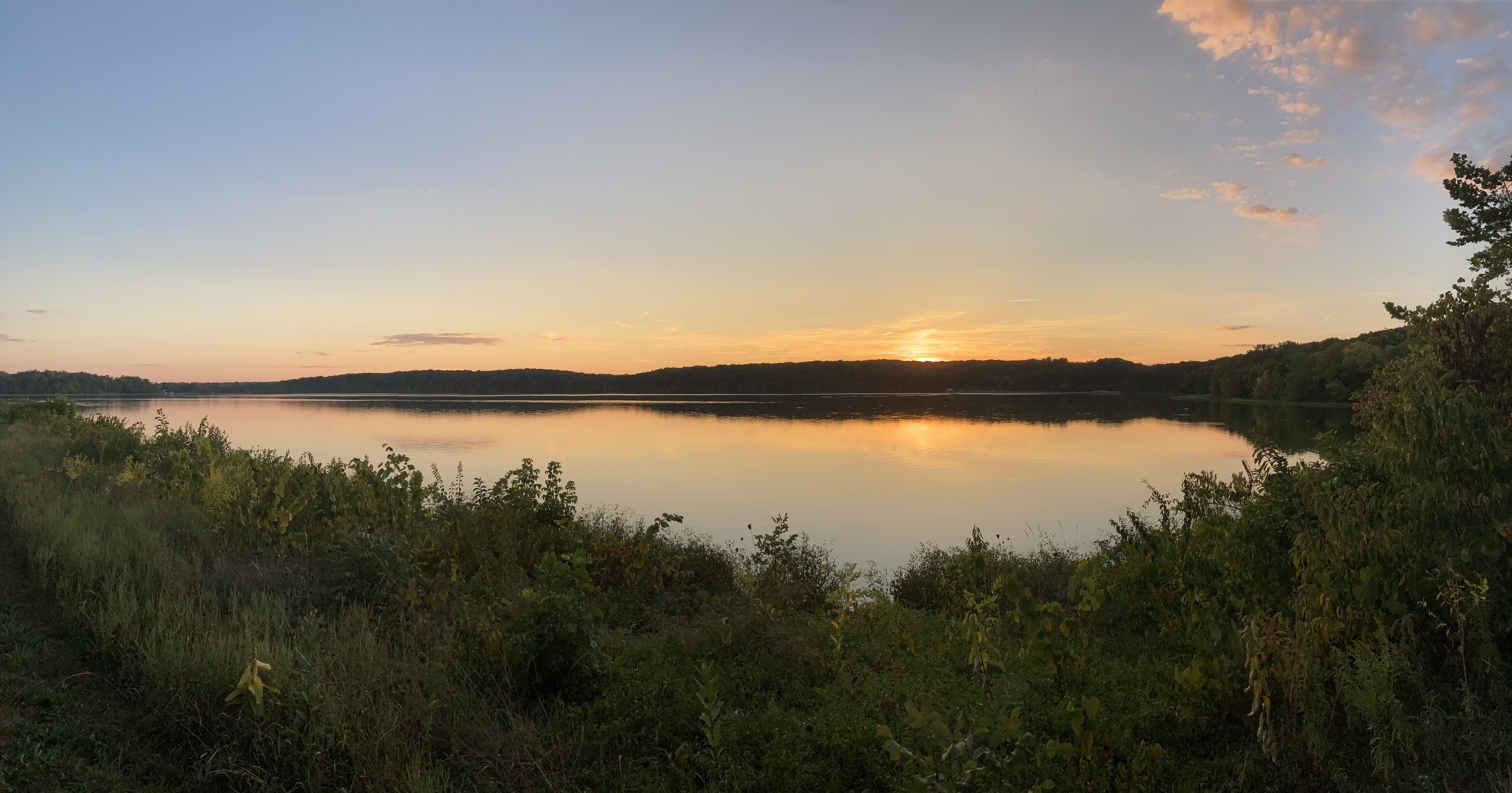
Lake Charleston at sunset.

=== List of Parks ===
- Fox Ridge State Park
- Morton Park
- Sister City Park
- Kiwanis Park
- North Park
- VFW Way Park
- Reasor Park

=== Parks and Recreation Department ===
Charleston's Parks and Recreation Department offers a variety of services, including before & after school clubs, a day club, dog training classes, and children sports leagues.

== Government ==
=== City Manager ===
Charleston is run under a City Manager style of government, where the City Manager is the city's chief administrative officer and oversees the City Council. The City Manager is an appointed position. As of September 18, 2003, R. Scott Smith, a former Parks & Recreation director, officially became Charleston's City Manager after serving as interim manager since August 9, 2003 and continues to hold that position as of January 2025.

=== City Council and Mayor ===
The City Council is an elected legislative body of the City of Charleston, of which the mayor is a part. They make policy decisions based on recommendations and information from the City Manager. Dr. Brandon Combs was appointed mayor of Charleston June 30, 2015 and continues to hold the office.

== Education ==
Charleston is served by Charleston Community Unit School District 1, one of three school districts located in Coles County. The district itself is composed of six schools: Ashmore Elementary School (PreK-4), Mark Twain Elementary School (PreK and K), Carl Sandburg Elementary School (1–3), Jefferson Elementary School (4–6), Charleston Middle School (7–8), and Charleston High School (9–12).

Eastern Illinois University is a public university in Charleston and has served the community since 1895; and Lakeview College of Nursing has a campus located in Charleston.

== Media ==
Charleston is served by the JG-TC (Journal Gazette & Times Courier) local newspaper, WEIU-FM, and Eastern Illinois University's daily newspaper The Daily Eastern News.

== Infrastructure ==
Charleston is located approximately 7 miles (11 km) east of Interstate 57's Mattoon exit. Illinois Route 16 serves as the city's main east–west road, titled Lincoln Ave. within city limits.

=== Highways ===
- Illinois Route 16 (Lincoln Ave.)
- Illinois Route 130 (18th St./Olive Ave.)
- Illinois Route 316 (Madison Ave./State St.)

=== Airport ===
Charleston is served by the Coles County Memorial Airport (MTO), which is approximately 6 miles (9.7 km) west of Charleston. Established in 1953, the airport received commercial service until 2000, and now serves as a public general aviation facility.

=== Mass Transit ===
Charleston is serviced by two transit providers: the Charleston Zipline run by Dial-A-Ride which serves the general city area with a deviated fixed-route and demand-response service, and the Panther Shuttle, which mainly services the Eastern Illinois University campus.

=== Rail ===
Charleston does not receive direct passenger rail service, however Amtrak's Illini and Saluki and City of New Orleans routes stop in neighboring Mattoon. Freight-wise, Charleston was serviced by the Eastern Illinois Railroad, which was acquired by the Decatur & Eastern Illinois Railroad, which now services businesses in the region.

=== Healthcare ===
Charleston is serviced by the Sarah Bush Lincoln Health Center, whose main campus is approximately 6 miles (9.7 km) west of Charleston. There is a Walk-In Clinic located within the city itself.

== Notable people ==
- Kim Chizevsky-Nicholls, IFBB pro bodybuilder
- Ronald W. Davis, director of the Stanford Genome Technology Center, biochemist, geneticist
- Frank K. Dunn, Chief Justice of the Illinois Supreme Court
- Jim Edgar, governor of Illinois from 1990 to 1998, was raised in Charleston
- Jeff Gossett, longtime journeyman punter who played in the NFL for 16 years
- Ben Hess, professional baseball player
- George Hilton Jones III, historian and author
- Joshua Scott Jones, Big Machine Records recording artist and one-half of the duo "Steel Magnolia"
- Tom Koch, longtime comedy writer for Mad Magazine and Bob and Ray
- David Lamb, musician and songwriter for Brown Bird
- James John Liautaud, founder of the Jimmy John's restaurant franchise
- Lee Lynch, Illinois newspaper editor and politician
- Rex Morgan, basketball player
- Marty Pattin, pitcher for various teams
- Curtis Price, the Principal of the Royal Academy of Music and a professor of music at the University of London
- Zeke Rosebraugh, pitcher for the Pittsburgh Pirates
- Stan Royer, former Major League Baseball player
- Willis R. Shaw, Illinois state senator; born in Charleston
- Larry Stuffle, member of the Illinois House of Representatives from 1977 to 1985.
- Gregg Toland, cinematographer of Citizen Kane and Wuthering Heights
