= Sheridan Downtown Commercial Historic District =

Historic district in Indiana, United States

- U.S. National Register of Historic Places
- U.S. Historic district
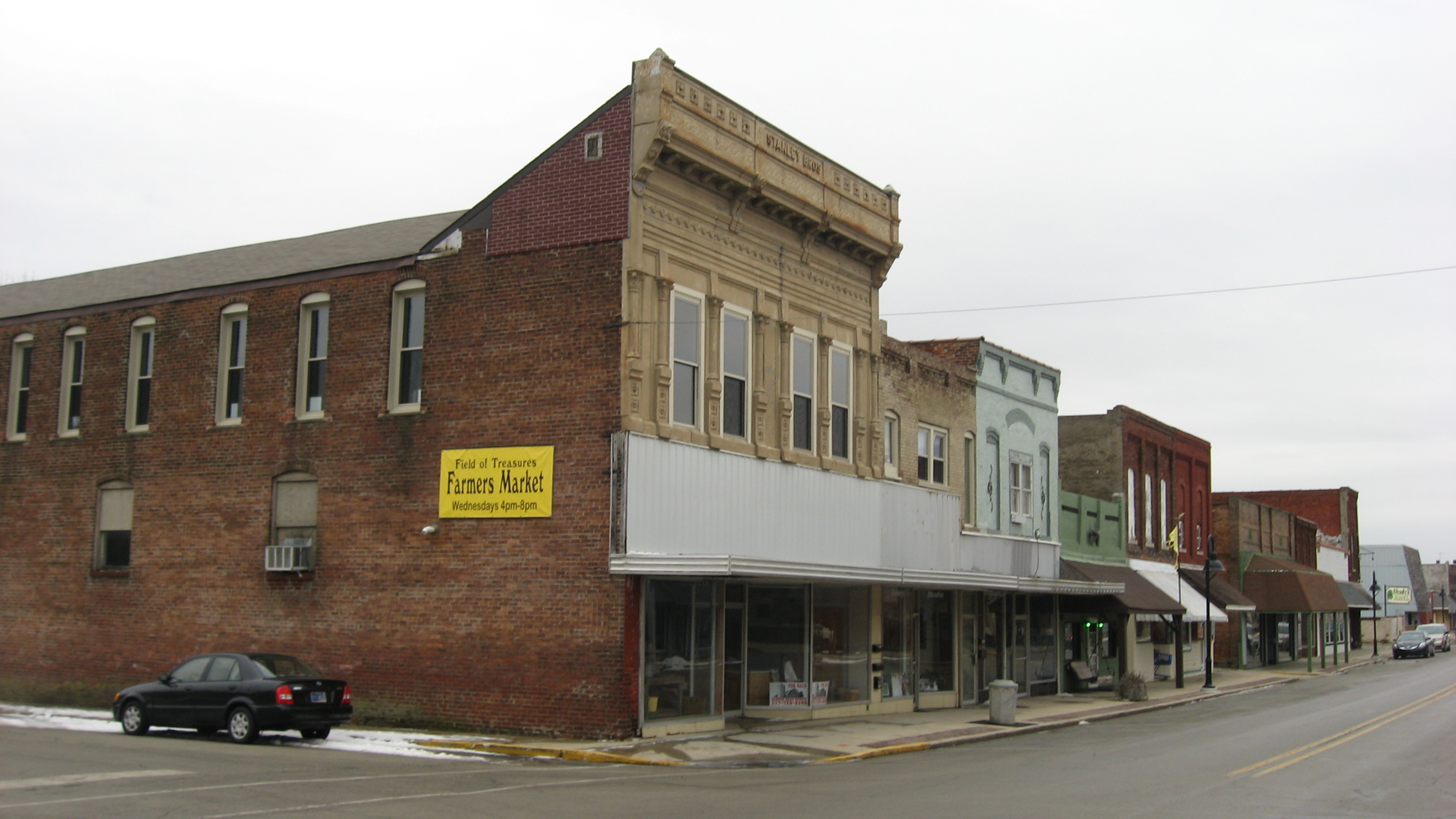
- South Main, Sheridan Downtown Commercial Historic District, January 2012
- Location: Roughly includes Main St. from E. 2nd to the Old Monon Railroad right-of-way, Sheridan, Indiana
- Coordinates: 40°8′14″N 86°13′14″W
- Area: 11 acres (4.5 ha)
- Architect: Dick, Hugh S.; Bond, Charles Austin
- Architectural style: Italianate, Romanesque, et al.
- NRHP reference No.: 07000979
- Added to NRHP: September 20, 2007

Sheridan Downtown Commercial Historic District is a national historic district located at Sheridan, Indiana. It encompasses 38 contributing buildings and one contributing structure in the central business district of Sheridan. It developed between about 1880 and 1939, and includes notable examples of Italianate and Romanesque Revival style architecture. Notable buildings include the H.J. Thistlethwaite Building (1886), Carnegie library, First Christian Church (1910–1911), Higbee Buggy Company, American State Bank (1914), Stanley Brothers Building (c. 1895), Elliot's Drugstore (c. 1913), Indiana Telephone Company building (c. 1910), and U.S. Post Office (1939–1940).

It was listed on the National Register of Historic Places in 2007.
