= George Boxley =

American abolitionist

George Boxley (1780–1865) was an American abolitionist and former slaveholder who allegedly tried to coordinate a rebellion of enslaved people on March 6, 1815, while living in Spotsylvania, Virginia. His plan was based on "heaven-sent" orders to free slaved people. He tried to recruit enslaved people from Orange, Spotsylvania, and Louisa counties to meet at his home with horses, guns, swords and clubs. He planned to attack and take over Fredericksburg and Richmond, Virginia. Lucy, an enslaved woman, informed her owner, and the plot was foiled. Five slaves were executed for their involvement in the plot and another six were sentenced to transportation. With his wife's help, Boxley escaped from the Spotsylvania County Jail and, despite a reward, he was never caught.

Boxley fled to Ohio and Indiana, where he was joined by his family. He built a cabin in 1830, the first in Adams Township. He helped escapees, taught school, and supported abolitionism. The George Boxley Cabin has been listed on the National Register of Historic Places.

== Boxley’s years as an Indiana pioneer ==
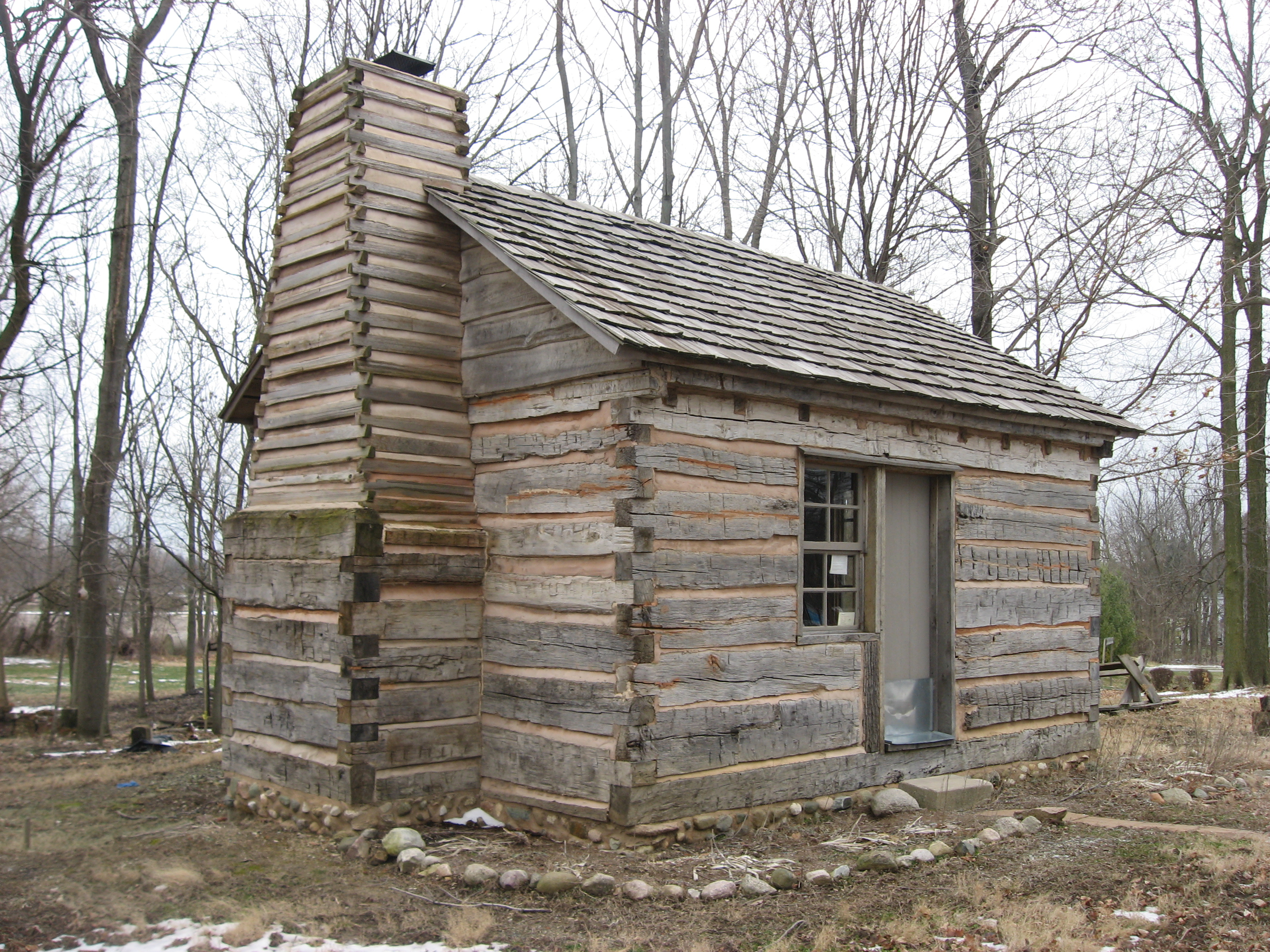
Boxley's cabin in Sheridan

George Boxley, a native of Virginia, was born in 1780. He was a merchant storekeeper and miller who became deeply committed to abolitionism. He arrived in Indiana as a fugitive from justice and was the first settler in Adams Township, Hamilton County, Indiana. Accounts vary in details, but the facts are that Boxley, while being a slaveowner at the time, opposed—or came to oppose—the institution of slavery. Boxley was accused of helping slaves to escape and of fomenting a slave rebellion in Spotsylvania County, Virginia. Jailed, he made his escape aided by his wife Hannah. After fleeing Virginia, Boxley may have spent a brief time in Pennsylvania.

Various accounts indicate that he lived in Ohio and the Missouri Territory at different times, and that at least once he was confronted by bounty hunters but was able to elude them. His family eventually joined him each time he relocated. Finally Boxley headed to Indiana, pausing first at Strawtown with the idea of continuing westward to settle along the Wabash River. Sources indicate that on his way west through the heavily forested land, Boxley took note of what was to become his future home and decided to stake a claim there.

It was about 1828 that Boxley arrived to stay in Adams Township, his family soon joining him. Boxley recorded the 80 acres (320,000 m^{2}) of land on which he had built his cabin in 1830, the earliest in the township. Boxley was a well-read man and believed strongly in education. On his land, he soon constructed a small log school for his own children and those of other settlers starting to come into the area.

Boxley is credited with establishing the first school in the township. He taught his pupils from the books in his own library, educating them in history, literature, law and politics, about which he held strong views. How long he kept the school going is unclear, but it was at least until about 1838, when a subscription school became available in the settlement of Englewood (later, Bakers Corner) roughly four miles to the east, and possibly even longer. In 1851, a township school was finally established near the southeast corner of Boxley's land.

Local folklore holds that Boxley participated in the Underground Railroad by hiding runaway slaves in an excavated place beneath his cabin. Certainly his abolitionist views were widely known, but there is no concrete evidence to document his having participated in the Underground Railroad. Such activity is known to have taken place to the southeast in the Westfield area, and some sources indicate there was a route that would have passed, and perhaps included, Boxley's cabin. On the other hand, since Boxley's strong libertarian and abolitionist sympathies were public knowledge, logic suggests that the Boxley property might have been a too obvious—and thus insecure—hiding place for fugitive slaves. But this would not have prevented him from helping in any number of other ways.

== Marriage and family ==
George Boxley married Hannah in Fredericksburg, Virginia, and they had 11 children together, some born after they left the South. While some were young adults when Boxley arrived in Indiana, the youngest among them were born in his years on the run. His youngest child became the first recorded death in the township: Benjamin Boxley was killed by a tree that fell on him during a severe thunderstorm.

After the death of his wife in 1853, George Boxley had deteriorating health. At some point, he left his cabin to live with his son Caswell (1817–1891), a lawyer and schoolteacher. Caswell's first wife died in 1858, and possibly his father came to live with him at that time. Caswell rapidly remarried, finding a second wife, Sarah Ann Kercheval, whom he married in 1859. He also purchased his father's land then.

George Boxley died in 1865 and was buried in the cemetery of the town named after him.

== Legacy and honors ==
- In 1836, Boxley's two oldest sons, Thomas and Addison, founded Boxleytown about four miles (6 km) to the northeast of the Boxley cabin on the old Lafayette Trace. This was a significant road for decades. In the 1830s, a state road had been routed to the south that had formerly run across George Boxley's property.
- 2007 – The restored logs of the George Boxley Cabin were reassembled on the original foundation on Pioneer Hill in Sheridan's Veterans Park. The Boxley Cabin has been listed on the National Register of Historic Places.
