= Booth Library =

Mary J. Booth Library
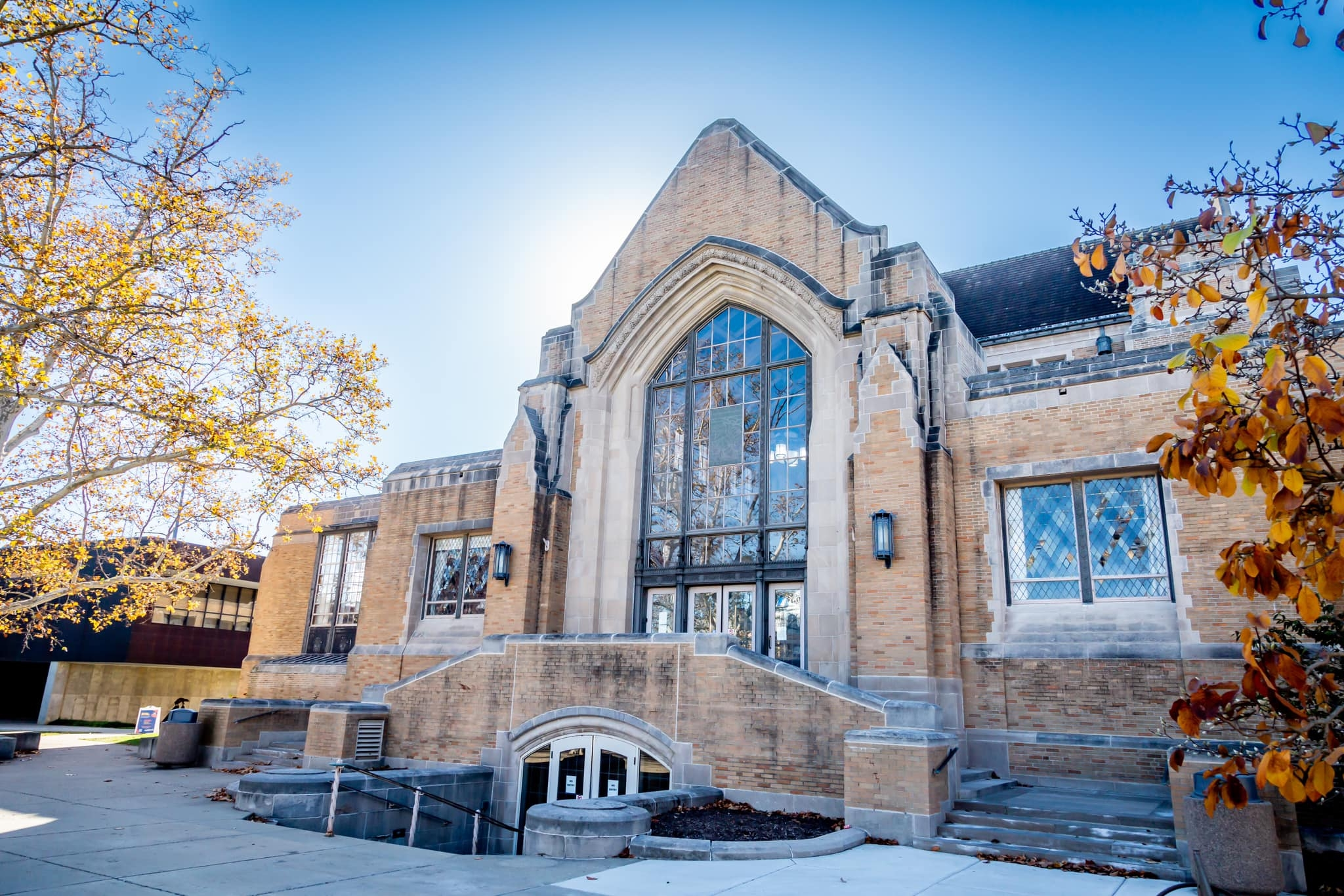
- 39°28′48″N 88°10′32″W
- Location: Charleston, Illinois, United States of America
- Type: Academic
- Established: 1948

Other information
- Public transit access: Coles County Zipline
- Website: https://www.library.eiu.edu

Mary J. Booth Library, named after University Librarian Mary Josephine Booth, serves the students, faculty and staff of Eastern Illinois University in Charleston, Illinois.

== History ==
=== Beginning of library services ===
The first library at Eastern Illinois University opened in 1899 and was located in two rooms on the first floor of Old Main. This first library covered 2,400 square feet (220 m^{2}) and contained 2,500 volumes. By 1920, the Library had expanded to include a storage area on the fifth floor and the reading room covered part of a hallway. Two additional rooms were added in 1934.

=== Booth Library ===
Mary Josephine Booth, who became University Librarian in 1904, lobbied for a free-standing library building for many years. In the early 1940s, the new building was approved and architect Joseph Booton drew up the plans. In 1948, three years after her retirement, Miss Booth turned the first shovel full of earth to begin the construction of Booth Library.

The $2.1 million building was dedicated in 1950. Spread across four floors, 37,500 square feet (3,480 m^{2}) of space was available with seating for 500 people and shelf space for 150,000 volumes. By 1965, the collection had grown to 114,000 volumes. Construction began for an annex in 1967, which extended shelving capacity to 475,000 volumes and expanded seating areas to hold 1,300 people. The annex opened to the public in 1968.

=== Renovation ===
In 1999, work began on a $22.5 million renovation and expansion project. Total available space was increased to 165,000 square feet (15,300 m^{2}) and shelving capacity was expanded to 1,500,000 volumes. The Chicago-based firm Holabird & Root worked closely with people from the library, the university, and the Illinois Capital Development Board to ensure that the renovated building would preserve the best features of the original architecture while improving the 1968 annex and unifying the original building, annex, and new addition to the south end of the building. The original 1948 south facade was exposed, restored, and now makes up one wall of the atrium connecting the north and south portions of the building. The 30-month renovation project was completed in 2002.

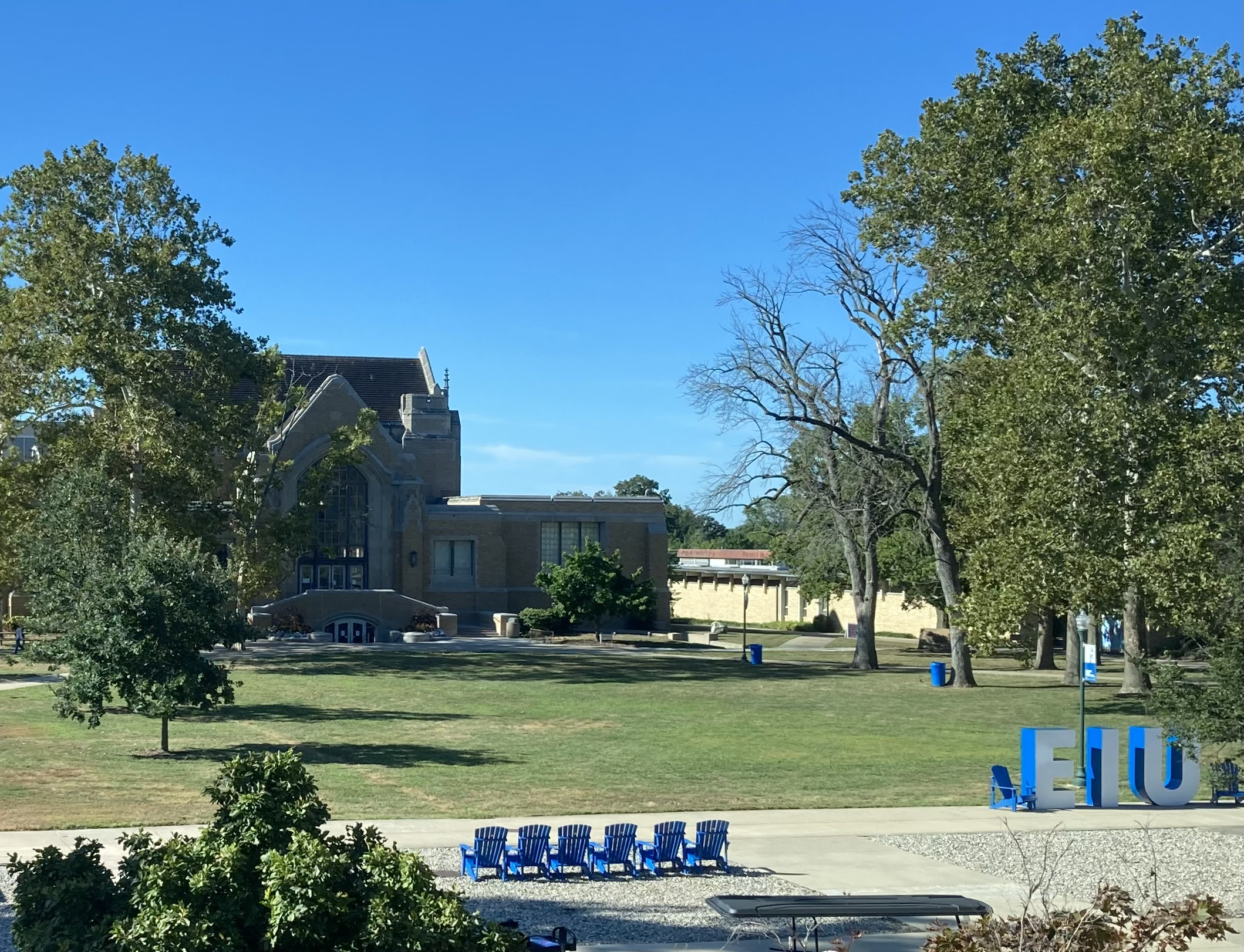

== Visiting ==
Booth Library is open to the public and residents of the state of Illinois may apply for a library card to check out materials. Metered parking is available in the lot at the south end of the building.

The library collection consists of more than 978,209 cataloged volumes, approximately 1.2 million microtexts, as well as maps, music scores, and pamphlets selected to support the university's educational mission. The government documents collection includes United States and Illinois State publications. Booth Library is also home to the Ballenger Teachers Center housing K-12 curriculum materials, an extensive juvenile collection, and a variety of non-print materials related to teachers and teaching. Leisure reading interests are served through materials from the general book, serial, and newspaper collections, as well as the latest best sellers, films, and popular materials. The general book collection and the periodicals collection are arranged according to the Library of Congress classification scheme.

Booth Library's public catalog is part of I-Share, the statewide network of 94 Illinois academic and research libraries. Additional electronic systems provide online access to a variety of periodical and subject databases. For the university community, interlibrary loan services supplement Booth Library's resources by making available materials that are owned by other libraries. I-Share and the EIU Online Catalog may be accessed from the library's website.
