= Livingston C. Lord =

Livingston C. Lord, about 1910

Livingston Chester Lord (August 27, 1851 – May 15, 1933) was the second president of Eastern Illinois University, serving from 1898 to 1933.

== Life before Eastern ==
Lord was born in Killingworth, Connecticut. He was the first son of Benjamin and Antoinette Case Lord. He completed his education at the Normal School in New Britain, Connecticut. Lord began teaching in 1871 as the principal of the Terryville, Connecticut high school. He married Mary E. Cook in 1873. The couple moved to Minnesota in 1874 where Lord taught for 24 years. He served as the first president of the Normal School at Moorhead, Minnesota during this time. Present day Minnesota State University Moorhead has named its library--the Livingston Lord Library after him.
