= Skylake Adventures =

Amusement park in Sheridan, Indiana

Skylake Amusement Park
- Interactive map of Skylake Amusement Park
- Location: Sheridan, United States
- Coordinates: 40°06′19″N 86°07′59″W
- Status: Operating
- Opened: 4 June 2026
- Operating season: Year-round
- Area: 126 acres (51 ha)
- Website: skylakeindiana.com

Skylake Adventures is a nature-based amusement park located in the town of Sheridan, Indiana. The park is located adjacent to U.S. Route 31 and Indiana State Road 38. Construction of the facility began in June 2025, with the park opening a year later in June 2026.

== Facilities ==
Skylake Adventures is located on a 126-acre facility, with the park being built on 75 of the acres. The park houses a 16,000,000 US gal (61,000,000 L; 13,000,000 imp gal) lake with a size of 6 acres (2.4 ha), an artificial beach with roughly 29,000 tons of sand, 10 water slides, a dock, a 6,000 ft^{2} (560 m^{2}) splash pad and several obstacle courses, known as "Wibits". The obstacle course system is the largest in the US, and the second largest in the world. The park has plans for the building of a mini golf course and an "aerial skyscraper" called the "Adventure Zone". A 40,000 ft^{2} (3,700 m^{2}) pavilion for events is also planned. The facility is planned to operate year-round.

== History ==
Construction of the park received approval from local authorities in May 2025, with a commission in the town of Sheridan voting in favor of rezoning the land parcel to allow the park's construction. The area making up the park was formerly part of unincorporated Adams Township, until a January 2025 vote approved its incorporation into Sheridan. The park was designed by Monarch Ventures LLC, a Carmel-based real-estate company, with the cost of construction being estimated at $100 million.

Groundbreaking for Skylake Adventures began on July 18, 2025. Due to a dry summer, construction and dirt-moving work was able to move forward at a faster pace than what was originally projected. The original opening date for Skylake was scheduled for June 1, 2026. A ribbon-cutting ceremony for the park was arranged on June 4. The project is planned the be built in phases, with the second phase involving the construction of a ropes course, and the third phase involving a tubing hill. All phases are expected to be finished by 2031. The park is projected to receive around 500,000 annual visitors.
