= Eastern Illinois University =

Public university in Charleston, Illinois, US

- Former names: Eastern Illinois State Normal School (1899–1921); Eastern Illinois State Teachers College (1921–1947); Eastern Illinois State College (1947–1957)
- Type: Public university
- Established: 1895; 131 years ago
- Endowment: $139.9 million (2025)
- President: Jay Gatrell
- Provost: Holly Farley
- Students: 8,107 (fall 2025)
- Undergraduates: 6,731 (fall 2025)
- Postgraduates: 1,376 (fall 2025)
- Location: Charleston, Illinois, U.S. 39°29′4″N 88°10′31″W
- Campus: College town, 320 acres (129.5 ha)
- Newspaper: The Daily Eastern News
- Colors: Blue and grey
- Nickname: Panthers
- Sporting affiliations: NCAA Division I FCS — Ohio Valley Conference
- Mascot: Billy the Panther
- Website: www.eiu.edu

Eastern Illinois University (EIU, Eastern) is a public university in Charleston, Illinois, United States. Established in 1895, EIU awards bachelor's and master's degrees in programs organized into four colleges: Arts and Sciences, Business and Technology, Education, and Health & Human Services.

== History and campus ==
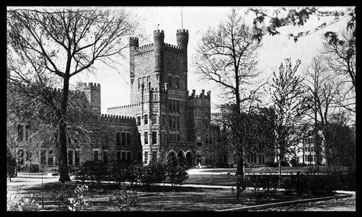
Old Main c. 1900

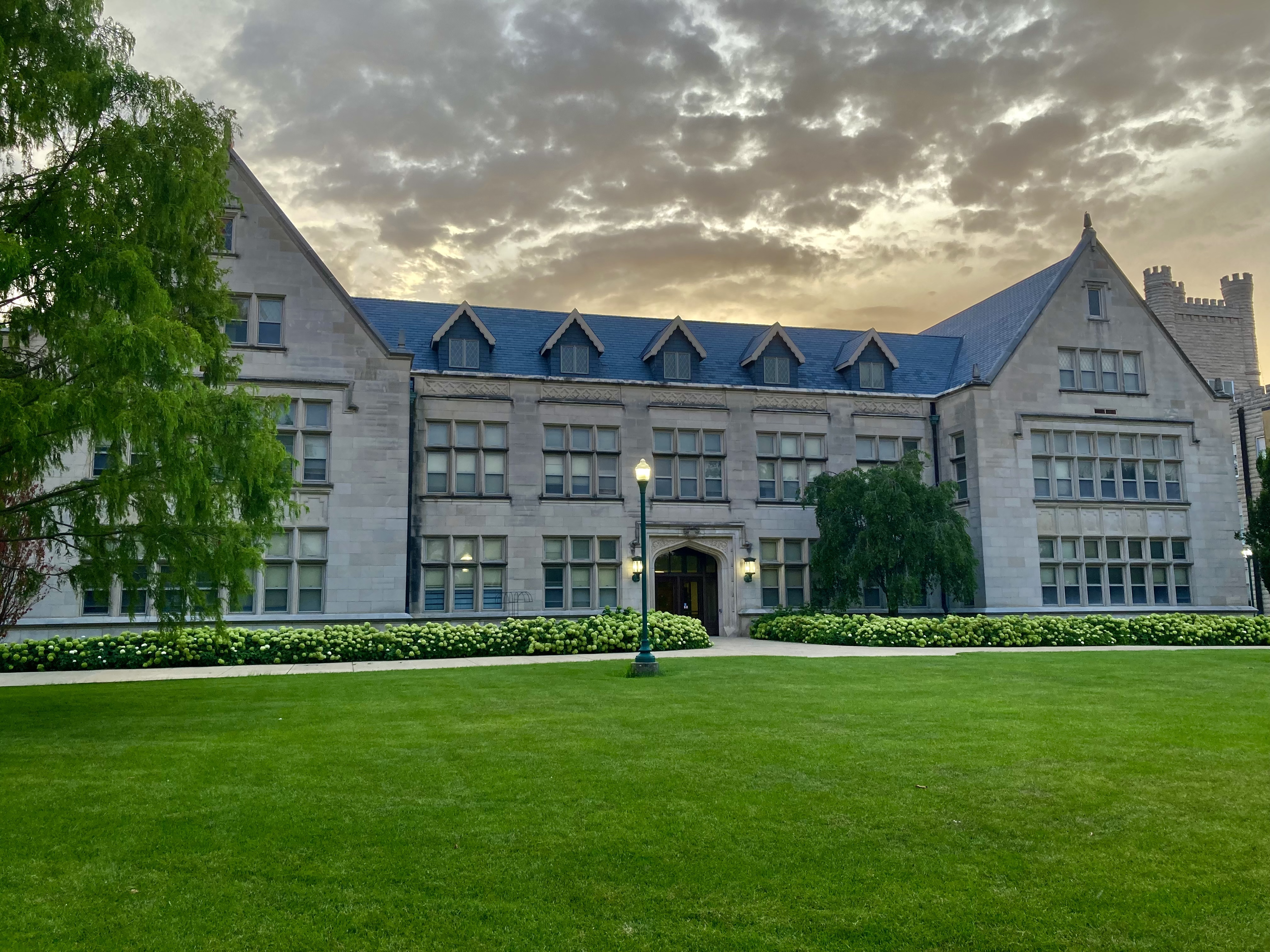
Blair Hall in 2025

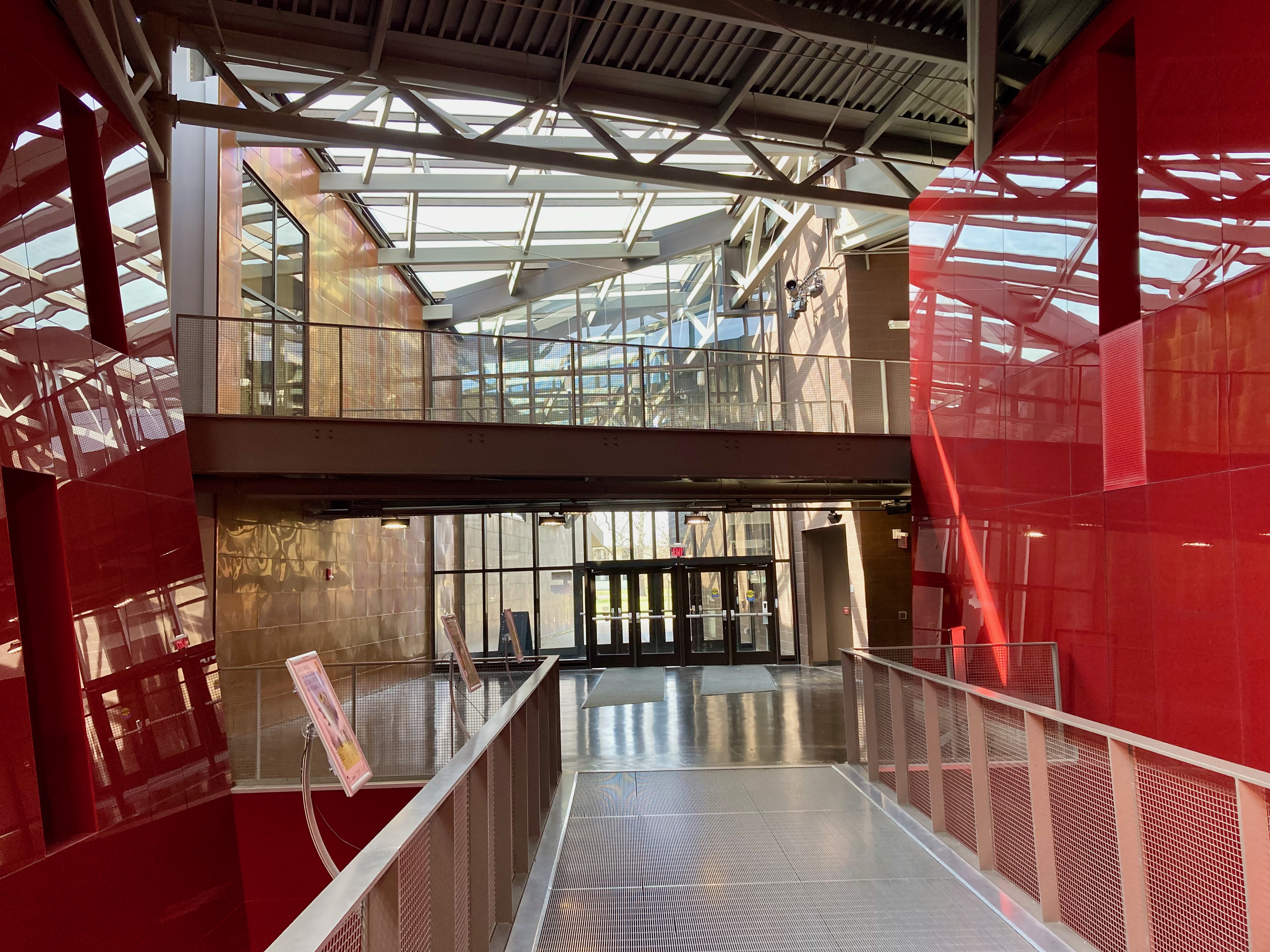
Doudna Fine Arts Center in 2023

Eastern Illinois University was established by the Illinois State Legislature in 1895 as the Eastern Illinois Normal School to "train teachers for the schools of East Central Illinois." Throughout its history, the school adapted its name several times to reflect its development into a comprehensive university, becoming Eastern Illinois State Teachers College in 1921 and Eastern Illinois State College in 1947. In 1957, the Illinois General Assembly changed the name of the institution to Eastern Illinois University.

Upon establishment, an initial 40-acre parcel for the campus was acquired in Charleston, Illinois, the seat of Coles County. When classes began in 1899 there were 125 students and 18 faculty members; the first campus building was Old Main. Built of Indiana limestone and featuring Medieval features like turrets and battlements, Old Main's primary tower has an asymmetrical profile that is featured on the university's marketing and official symbols.

Eastern's Old Main belongs to a group of central buildings on five university campuses around the state called "Altgeld's castles," which were built in the 1890s at the direction of then-Governor John Peter Altgeld, who advocated for architecture with visual interest. Additional architectural points of interest on EIU's campus include the Gothic Revival Booth Library, Pemberton Hall, and Blair Hall; Blair was restored after a fire in 2004.

The Doudna Fine Arts Center (completed 2008) is a centerpiece of Eastern's campus. Designed by architect Antoine Predock, the 138,000-square-foot (12,800 m^{2}) complex has facilities for the music, theatre, and visual arts departments, including numerous studios, workshops, and labs; three theater venues; a concert hall; and a recital hall. The building has interior and exterior copper facades and multiple-story color-glass interior walls. It also has several interior bridges to connect the various wings within the four-story concourse which itself serves as a multi-use space for the university and the region.

=== Presidents ===
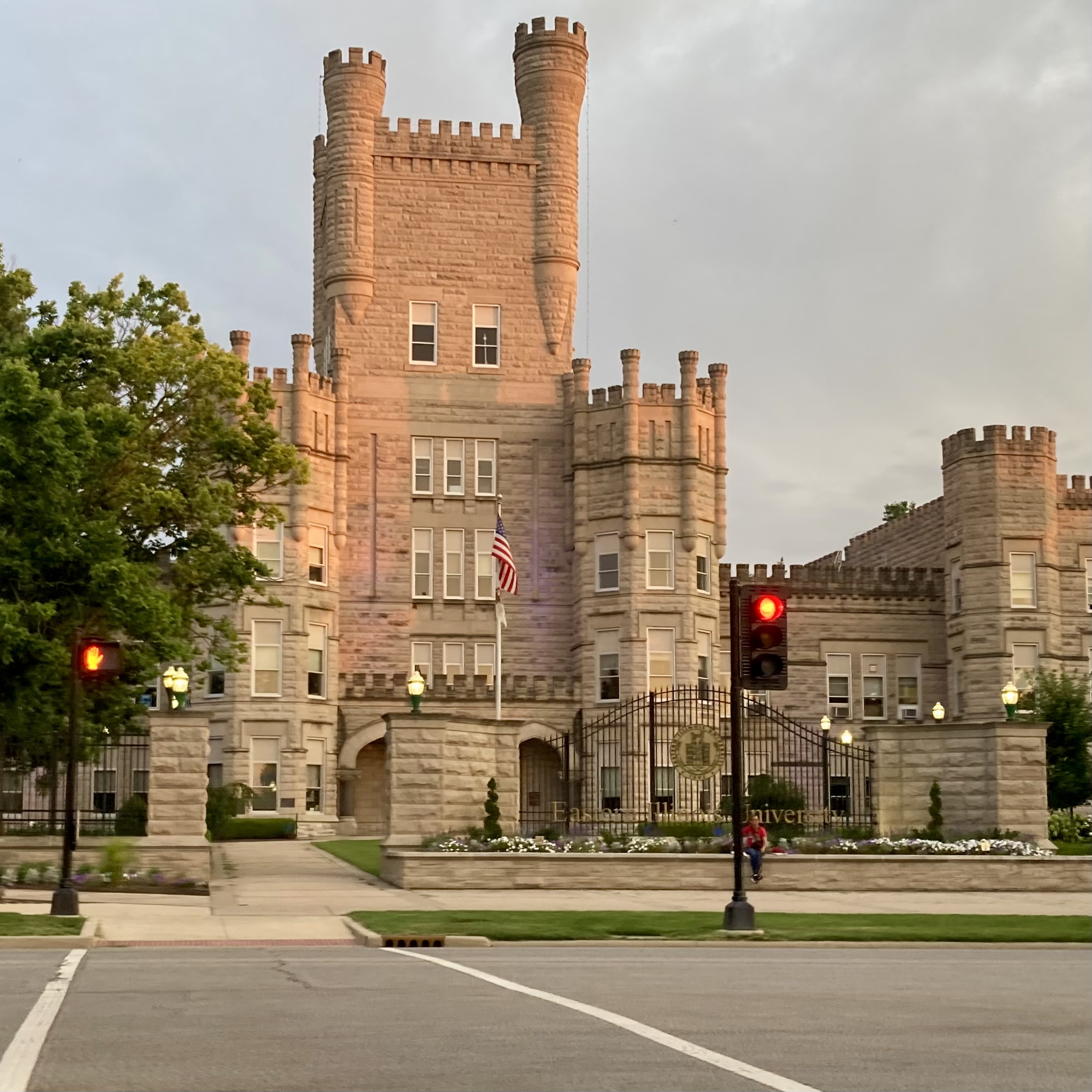
Old Main is the oldest building at Eastern Illinois University.

- Samuel M. Inglis (appointed in 1898 but died before officially assuming office)
- Livingston C. Lord (1899 to 1933)
- Robert G. Buzzard (1933 to 1956)
- Quincy Doudna (1956 to 1971)
- Gilbert C. Fite (1971 to 1976)
- Daniel E. Marvin (1977 to 1983)
- Stanley G. Rives (1983 to 1992)
- David L. Jorns (1992 to 1999)
- Carol D. Surles (1999 to 2001)
- Louis V. Hencken (2001 to 2007)
- William L. Perry (2007 to 2015)
- David M. Glassman (2015 to 2023)
- Jay Gatrell (2023 to present)

=== Alma mater ===
The EIU Alma Mater was composed by Friederich Koch during his tenure at Eastern. The lyrics were originally a poem titled "For Us Arose Thy Walls and Towers" by Isabel McKinney, a professor of English at Eastern from 1911 to 1945. Before Koch's melody was employed, the McKinney lyrics were set to the German folk tune Die Wacht am Rhein (The Watch on the Rhine) but were changed around the time of World War I due to anti-German sentiments.

== Academics ==
Eastern Illinois University is accredited by the Higher Learning Commission. Its educator certification programs are accredited by the Council for the Accreditation of Educator Preparation. Eastern offers 51 undergraduate degree programs, 32 graduate degree programs, and 10 post-baccalaureate certificate programs.

Eastern is divided into four colleges:

- College of Liberal Arts and Sciences
- Lumpkin College of Business & Technology
- College of Education
- College of Health & Human Services

Other academic divisions include the Graduate School, Sandra & Jack Pine Honors College, and the School of Extended Learning. The Graduate School was founded in 1951 and has an enrollment of approximately 1,800 full and part-time students with more than 300 faculty holding graduate faculty status. The university also includes the Center for Academic Support and Achievement, the Office of Inclusion and Academic Engagement, the Office of Research and Sponsored Programs, and the Office of Study Abroad. The university's Booth Library hosts yearly exhibits, the Ballenger Teachers Center, and numerous digital collections. The main university art museum, the Tarble Arts Center, maintains a 1,000-piece permanent collection, including a 500-piece collection of late 20th-century Illinois folk arts and related archival information. A majority of the holdings are concentrated on art from the state of Illinois and the Midwest region.

=== Reputation and rankings ===
In the 2025 U.S. News & World Report college rankings, Eastern Illinois University is ranked 14th in Top Public Schools.

== Student life ==
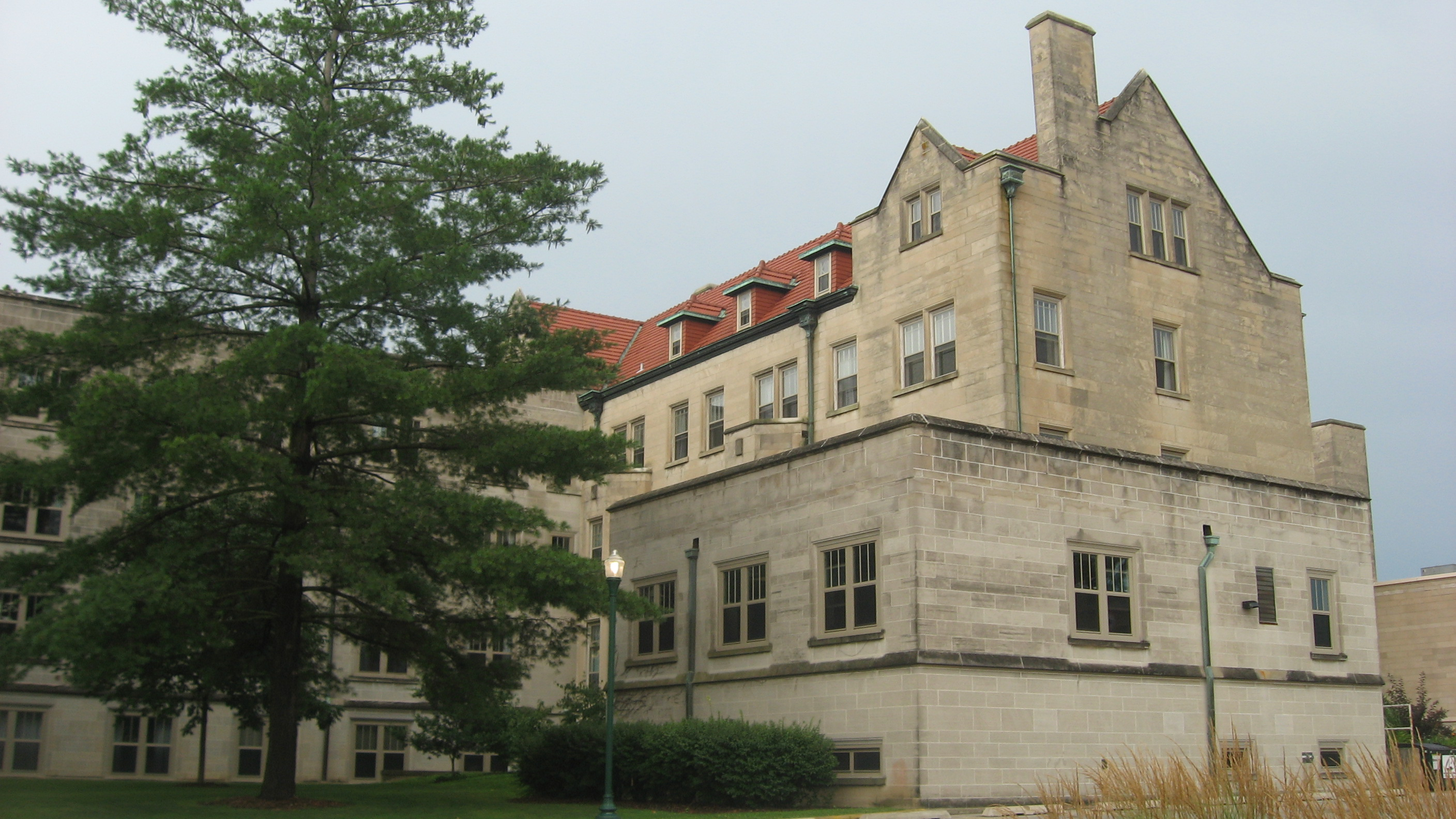
Pemberton Hall, a women's residence hall and honors college

Eastern Illinois University has roughly 8,500 students. As of 2024, tuition is approximately $10,150 for all domestic undergraduates, while it is $12,688 for international undergraduates. Additional fees amount to $3,506.68. The university estimates its average cost-of-attendance to be approximately $24,640 per academic year.

Eastern Illinois University offers over 170 student organizations, ranging from religious, multicultural, service, academic, Greek, honorary, governing, social, athletic and political organizations.

=== Residential life ===
Pemberton Hall was opened in 1908 and was the first all-female residence hall in Illinois; it is a registered historical landmark. The hall was named after Senator Stanton C. Pemberton, who helped get funding for the building approved. Pemberton has four residential floors and is a female hall. It is home to the Roosevelt Leadership Institute Living Learning Community. Pemberton was renovated in 2008 in celebration of its 100-year anniversary and is purported to be haunted.

Lincoln Hall is a female residence hall neighboring Powell-Norton Hall, which is a male residence hall (formerly named Douglas Hall). Both were completed ca. 1952 and contain laundry facilities, a common dining room, a recreation room, as well as several kitchenettes to allow students to make their own food. Major reconstruction was undertaken in 2010 to upgrade the bathrooms. Both Lincoln and Douglas Hall (now Powell-Norton) were named after the debates that Abraham Lincoln and Stephen Douglas held in Charleston, Illinois in 1858. Douglas Hall was renamed to Powell-Norton in April 2022 to commemorate Zella Powell and Ona Norton. Zella Powell was a student at Eastern Illinois University and was one of the first black graduates of the university. Ona Norton was a pillar of the Charleston community known for taking care of black students who attended the university in the 1950s.

McKinney Hall was originally opened in 1959 and named after Isabel McKinney, who taught English at the university and wrote the text of the EIU's Alma Mater. McKinney Hall is one of three halls in the "Triad." It has four residential floors in two wings; three floors in McKinney are co-ed with single-gender rooms. The fourth floor is home to the Gender Inclusive Housing - Doug DiBianco Living Learning Community. McKinney Hall was renovated in 2009.

Ford Hall opened in 1959 and is named after Ellen Ford, who taught Latin and German at EIU. Ford Hall is co-ed, has four residential floors in two wings, and is part of the "Triad." It was renovated in 2010.

Weller Hall was opened in 1960 and named after Annie Weller, a former geography professor. Located at the center of campus, Weller Hall is one of three that make up the "Triad." Weller has four residential floors in two wings and is co-ed. As of the 2024–2025 academic year, Weller Hall residency has been put on "pause" by the university under Plan 2028.

Thomas Hall opened in 1963 and has two residential wings with four floors on both sides.

Andrews Hall, opened in 1965, was the first high-rise building on campus. It consists of nine floors and is a female hall. In 2000, the hall underwent a remodel with the idea of making "Deluxe Double" suites that were joined by a door.

Taylor Hall was opened to male students in September 1966. This hall consists of five residential levels, two wings (North and South), and a communal main lobby. Taylor is currently a coed residential area, with males and females living on alternating floors. Although Taylor was designed to mirror Thomas Hall, the top floor and a half-underground floor were added to make the buildings look even since Taylor would have appeared smaller than Thomas due to the decline in terrain.

Lawson Hall opened in 1967 as an additional all-female housing option. For several years beginning in 2002, Lawson served as the home of the Fine Arts Departments while the Doudna Fine Arts Center was being built. The second and third floors were used for this purpose. Currently, the second floor has undergone renovations and is configured for conference space and visitor accommodations.

Stevenson Hall was constructed in 1968 and is a co-ed hall. It offers a 10th floor study area for students as well as a kitchenette area. Students wishing to live in Stevenson need to meet the requirement of being the age of 21 or older or have earned at least 30 post-high-school credit hours. Stevenson is the tallest building in Coles County and is named for Adlai E. Stevenson II, who served as the ambassador to the United Nations, Governor of Illinois, and ran twice for President.

Eastern Illinois University features two residence hall dining centers (Taylor and Stevenson), the University Food Court with six fast food locations, Java Beanery & Bakery (Java B & B), Chick-fil-A, Charleston Market, Panther Grille, Ace Sushi, Qdoba, and two Marketplace Convenience Centers.

=== Media ===
The student newspaper is The Daily Eastern News, founded in 1915.

The university's student-run radio station is Hit-Mix 88.9 WEIU.

WEIU-TV was, until recent federal budget cuts, a PBS station on the campus of Eastern Illinois University. The station continues independently, and the student-run news program is News Watch.

== Athletics ==
Eastern Illinois University's colors are blue and grey; the sports teams' mascot is the Panther. The teams participate in NCAA Division I (I-AA FCS for football) in the Ohio Valley Conference. Eastern Illinois University was a member of the Illinois Intercollegiate Athletic Conference from 1912 to 1970.

The football team competes at home in O'Brien Field. Eastern Illinois is also the host of the IHSA Boys and Girls State Track and Field Finals, which have been held at O'Brien Field since the 1970s. They also host the IHSA Girls State Badminton Finals and previously hosted the State Journalism Finals.
