= Davenport House, Duntisbourne Abbots =

Historic building in Duntisbourne Abbots, Gloucestershire

Davenport House
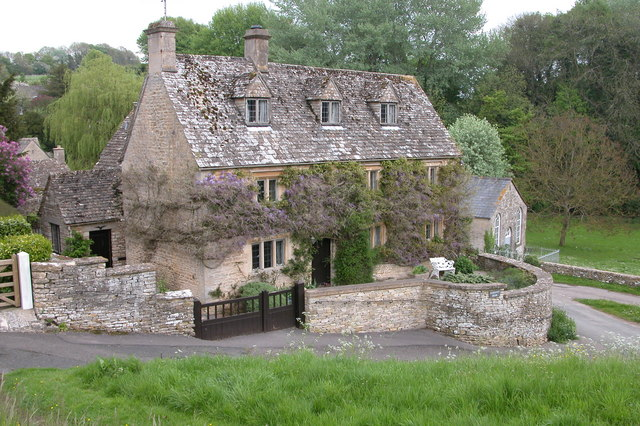
- The house in 2006

- Location within Gloucestershire
- 51.7694°N 2.0429°W
- Location: Duntisbourne Abbots, Gloucestershire, England

History
- Built: 17th century

Listed Building – Grade II
- Designated: 4 June 1952
- Reference no.: 1088460

Davenport House is an historic building in the English village of Duntisbourne Abbots, Gloucestershire. Located on the eastern side of the village, it was built in the 17th century, and is now a Grade II listed building.

A spring 20 metres (66 ft) south of the home is also listed.
