= Fox Ridge, South Dakota =

Coordinates: 44°59′40″N 102°31′32″W

Fox Ridge is a ghost town in Meade County, in the U.S. state of South Dakota. The GNIS classifies it as a populated place.

== History ==
A post office called Fox Ridge was established in 1911, and remained in operation until 1940. The town had the name of Fox, an Indian outlaw who was killed at a nearby ridge.
