= Hanford Davenport House =

Historic house in Connecticut, United States

- U.S. National Register of Historic Places
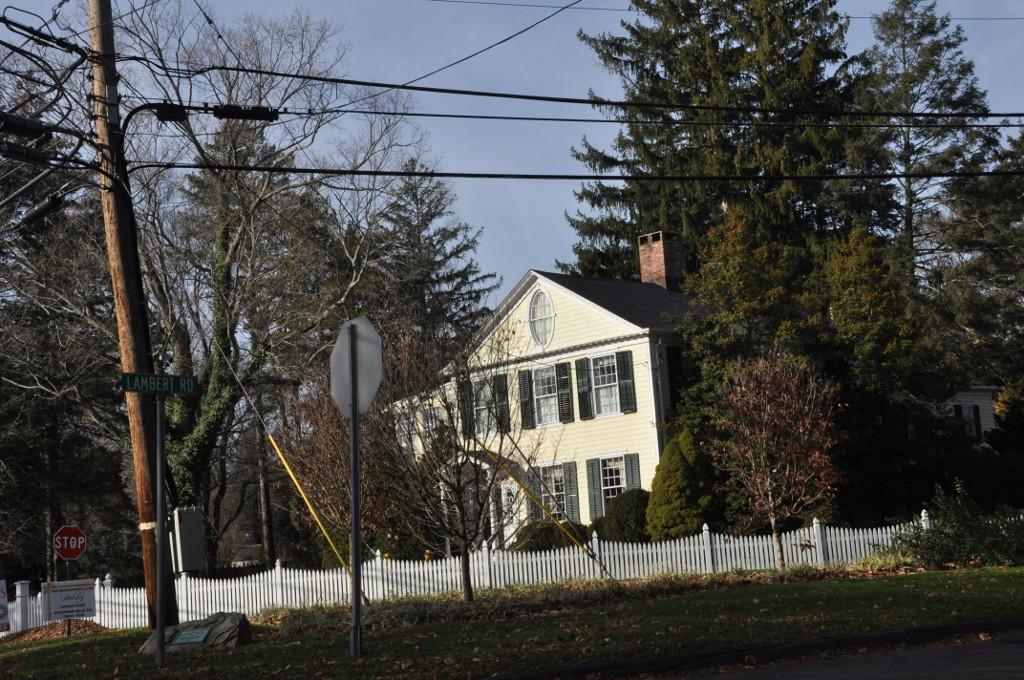

- Location within Connecticut Location within the United States
- Location: 353 Oenoke Ridge, New Canaan, Connecticut
- Coordinates: 41°9′35″N 73°30′13″W
- Area: 2.7 acres (1.1 ha)
- Built: 1820
- Architect: Crissey, Hiram
- Architectural style: Federal
- NRHP reference No.: 89000948
- Added to NRHP: August 3, 1989

The Hanford Davenport House, also known as the Davenport-Green House, is a historic house at 353 Oenoke Ridge in New Canaan, Connecticut, United States. It was built in 1820. It was listed, along with a 19th-century barn on the property, on the National Register of Historic Places in 1989. The house is significant as a fine example of Federal architecture and features especially high quality Adamesque carving in its interior.

== Description and history ==
The Hanford Davenport House stands in a rural residential setting north of New Canaan's village center, on the northern corner of Oenoke Ridge and Lambert Road. It is a 2 1/2-story wood-frame structure, presenting proper facades to both streets. The Lambert Street facade is five bays, with sash windows arranged symmetrically around a center entrance, above which is a Palladian window. The entry is flanked by sidelight windows and topped by a fanlight, and is sheltered by a gabled portico. The Oenoke Ridge facade is three bays wide, with the entry in the leftmost bay; it is stylistically similar to the other entry. The gable end above this facade features an oval window. The interior of the house has many high quality original carvings, including window surrounds, fireplace mantels, and doorways. An ell of uncertain vintage, possibly the remnants of an old smithy, extends to the north.

The house was built about 1820, most likely by Hanford Davenport, on land belonging to his in-laws. The interior woodwork was done by Hiram Cressey, a local woodcarver well known for his high quality work. The house remained in the Davenport family until 1905.

== See also ==
- National Register of Historic Places listings in Fairfield County, Connecticut
