= Quincy Doudna =

American academic administrator

Quincy Doudna (January 16, 1907 – April 21, 1987) was an American academic administrator who was the president of Eastern Illinois University from 1956 to 1971. He was previously an administrator at the University of Wisconsin–Stevens Point.

Doudna grew up in Poynette, Wisconsin and in 1927 became a high school science teacher in Antigo, Wisconsin. He became a high school principal in 1934 and became a college administrator in 1937.

Doudna was a graduate of Carroll College in Waukesha, Wisconsin. He also earned a master's degree in arts, plus a doctorate in philosophy, from the University of Wisconsin.
