= Lee Lynch (Illinois politician) =

American newspaper editor and politician

Charles Lee Lynch (July 10, 1901 – June 15, 1951) was an American newspaper editor and politician.

Born in Charleston, Illinois, Lynch lived in Charleston, Illinois for most of his life and was a newspaper reporter and the city editor for the Charleston Daily News and was also a radio news editor and harness race official. Lynch served on the Charleston Zoning Commission and was the city tax collector. Lynch was elected to the Illinois House of Representatives as a Democrat. Lee died of a heart attack on June 15, 1951, which he had suffered the previous day, on June 14, 1951, in Springfield, Illinois while the Illinois House of Representatives was in session.
