= Five Mile House (Illinois) =

- House
- Location of Five Mile House within Illinois
- Country: United States
- State: Illinois
- County: Coles
- Built: 1840

Area
  - Total: 40 acres (16 ha)
- Time zone: UTC-6 (CST)
  - Summer (DST): UTC-5 (CST)
- Postal code: 61920
- Website: https://www.fivemilehouse.org/

The Five Mile House is a historic brick house five miles [CONVERT] southeast of Charleston, IL, at the intersection of IL 130 and Westfield Rd. Built in the 1840s, the house is one of the oldest remaining structures in Coles County. The house is now operated as a museum and is owned by the Five Mile House Foundation. The name "Five Mile House" alludes to the house's distance from the Coles County Courthouse in Charleston.

== History ==
The land the house sits on was originally purchased by Levin Cartwright in 1837 for $50, or $1.25 an acre. It is thought that house was built in the mid-to-late 1840s, by brothers Rhodes and David Martin. Originally, the house only had two rooms with a fireplace on each end.

In 1849 the property was sold to Stephen Stone. It is thought that the house was used as a preparation point for Forty-Niners headed out West in search of gold.

In the 1850–60s a kitchen ell was added, and the west room fireplace was replaced with a four over four window. A porch was constructed in the early 1900s, and stucco was added to the exterior walls of the house. The six over six and four over four windows were also replaced with single-pane windows.

It is thought that the house was used to provide meals and lodging to travelers on the major roads that passed by. It is also likely that Abraham Lincoln stopped at the house during his travels on the Eighth Judicial Circuit.

== Present day ==
In 1999 the house was sold to the Five Mile House Foundation, with the aim to restore and preserve the building. The original brick walls, fireplace, and ceiling were saved, as well as some windows and doors. The original kitchen ell had been demolished by the time the Foundation acquired the property, but a replica using some of the original materials has been built. A capital project in 2008–2009 provided a new parking lot, sidewalks, handicap accessible ramp, and more. In 2012, a modern restroom made to look like an outhouse was added. The site now hosts multiple educational events and programs throughout the year.

In 2018 the C. P. Davis barn was deconstructed from its site three miles east of the house. The barn, built in 1880 by Commodore Perry Davis, was repaired in Galesburg, IL, and reconstructed on the Five Mile House site. The barn opened in 2019 and hosts summer programs such as blacksmithing and spinning.
