= George Boxley Cabin =

Historic house in Indiana, United States

- U.S. National Register of Historic Places
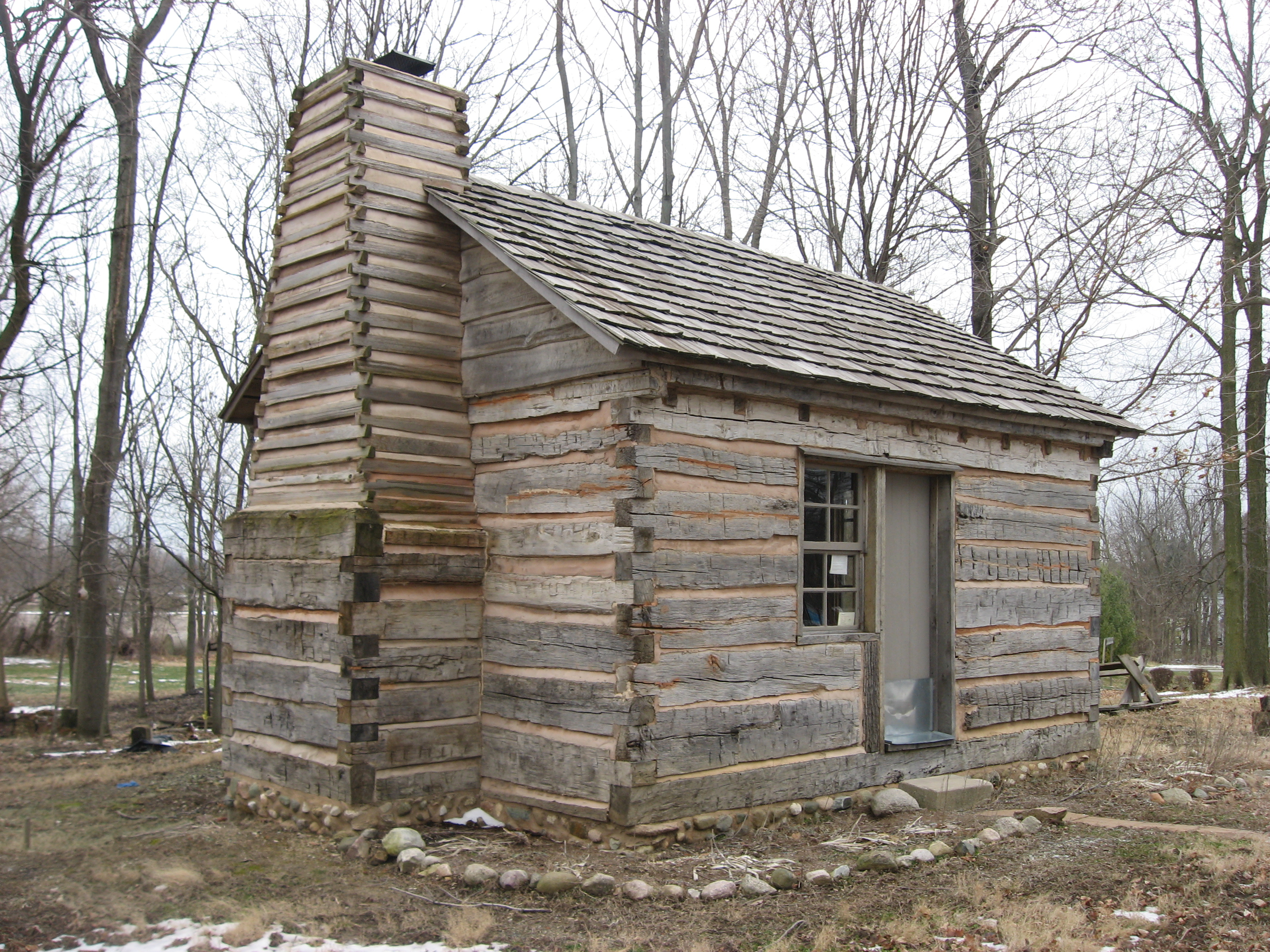
- George Boxley Cabin, January 2012

- Location within Indiana Location within the United States
- Location: Pioneer Hill at First and Main Sts., Sheridan, Indiana
- Coordinates: 40°8′21″N 86°13′16″W
- Area: less than one acre
- Built: c. 1828
- Built by: Boxley, George
- Architectural style: Single pen log cabin
- NRHP reference No.: 05001010
- Added to NRHP: September 15, 2005

George Boxley Cabin is a historic log cabin located at Sheridan, Indiana. It was built about 1828, and is a one-story, log structure measuring 18 feet, 6 inches, by 16 feet, 6 inches. It has a gable roof and exterior end chimney. It is typical of cabins built during this period. The building is owned by the Sheridan Historical Society and located in the Sheridan's Veterans Park.

It was listed on the National Register of Historic Places in 2005.
