= Five Mile House, Duntisbourne Abbots =

Pub in Duntisbourne Abbots, Gloucestershire, England

Coordinates: 51.782043°N 2.034221°W

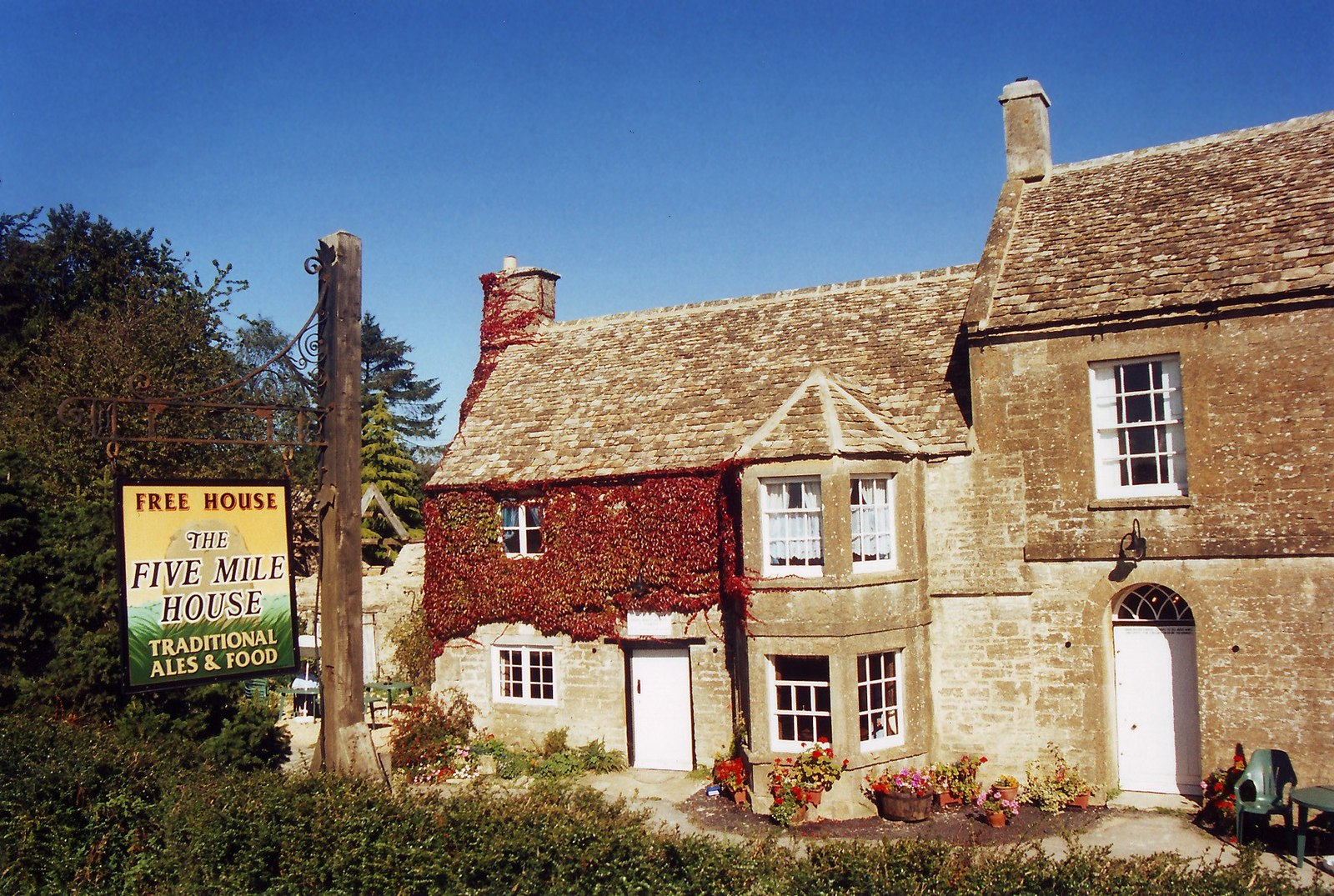
The Five Mile House

The Five Mile House is a historic former pub located on Old Gloucester Road in Duntisbourne Abbots, Gloucestershire, England. Built in the 17th century, it is a grade II listed building.

The pub was noted for its inclusion in the Campaign for Real Ale's National Inventory of Historic Pub Interiors, highlighting its historical and architectural importance. Situated on the ancient Roman road of Ermin Street, the pub was referred to in documents from 1891 and 1903 as "The Old Inn," suggesting a long history of serving travelers and locals alike.

The Five Mile House was owned and operated by the Ruck family from the 1930s until Ivy Ruck's passing in 1995. The pub's charm lay in its rustic features, including bare wood floors, open fires, wooden seating, and a small bar that led into the tap room.

The pub was bought and refurbished by the Carrier family, and reopened in 1997. Despite its historical allure, the Five Mile House closed in 2015. The closure was attributed to a significant decline in passing trade following the re-routing of the A417, which diverted traffic away from the area. The building was converted into a private residence.
