= Davenport-Bradfield House =

Historic house in Indiana, United States

- U.S. National Register of Historic Places
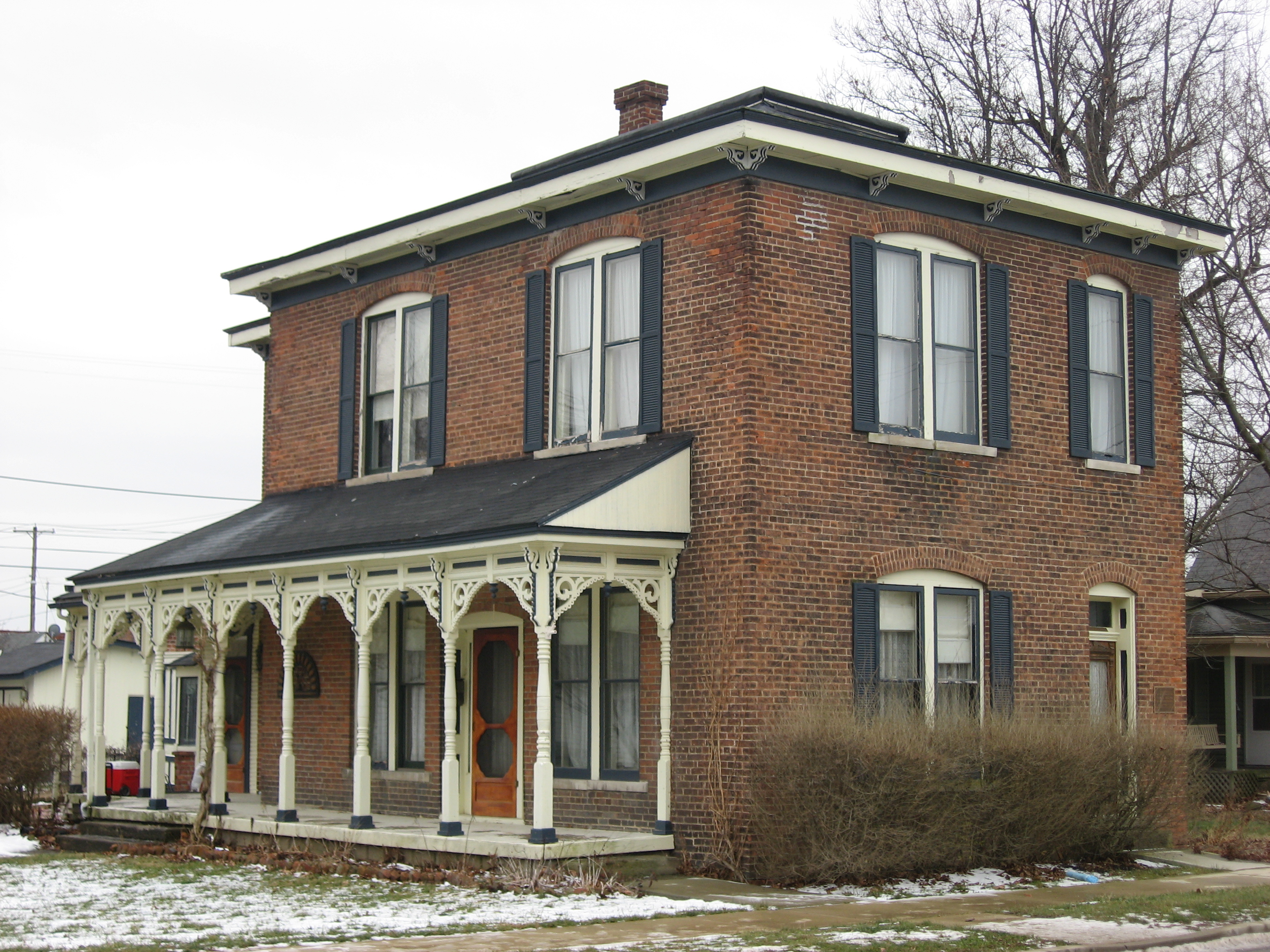
- Davenport-Bradfield House, January 2012

- Location within Indiana Location within the United States
- Location: 106 E. 2nd St., Sheridan, Indiana
- Coordinates: 40°8′13″N 86°13′11″W
- Area: less than one acre
- Built: 1875
- Architectural style: Italianate
- NRHP reference No.: 85000089
- Added to NRHP: January 18, 1985

Davenport-Bradfield House, also known as the Bradfield House, is a historic home located at Sheridan, Indiana. It was built in 1875, and is a two-story, Italianate style brick dwelling. It has a hipped roof and features a full-width, one-story front porch with turned posts, sawn brackets and trim, and paneled frieze.

It was listed on the National Register of Historic Places in 1985.
