= Hutton Township, Coles County, Illinois =

Hutton Township
- Township
- Location in Coles County

- Coles County's location in Illinois
- Coordinates: 39°25′N 88°6′W
- Country: United States
- State: Illinois
- County: Coles
- Established: November 8, 1859

Area
  - Total: 54.64 sq mi (141.5 km^{2})
  - Land: 54.5 sq mi (141 km^{2})
  - Water: 0.14 sq mi (0.36 km^{2}) 0.26%
- Elevation: 696 ft (212 m)

Population (2020)
  - Total: 763
  - Density: 14.0/sq mi (5.41/km^{2})
- Time zone: UTC-6 (CST)
  - Summer (DST): UTC-5 (CDT)
- ZIP codes: 61912, 61920 62420, 62474
- FIPS code: 17-029-36880

Hutton Township is one of twelve townships in Coles County, Illinois, USA. As of the 2020 census, its population was 763 and it contained 350 housing units.

== Geography ==
According to the 2010 census, the township has a total area of 54.64 square miles (141.5 km^{2}), of which 54.5 square miles (141 km^{2}) (or 99.74%) is land and 0.14 square miles (0.36 km^{2}) (or 0.26%) is water.

=== Cities, towns, villages ===
- Charleston (southeast edge)

=== Extinct towns ===
- Diona
- Hutton

=== Cemeteries ===
The township contains 18 cemeteries: Anderson, Beavers, Brandenburg, Coles County Poor Farm, Grant, Hurricane, Old Kelly, Liberty, McKenzie, Otterbein, Parker, Salisbury, Sargent, Stewart, Stringtown, Welch, Whetstone and Wiley Brick.

=== Major highways ===
- Illinois Route 130

=== Rivers ===
- Embarras River

== Demographics ==
As of the 2020 census there were 763 people, 319 households, and 216 families residing in the township. The population density was 13.94 inhabitants per square mile (5.38/km^{2}). There were 350 housing units at an average density of 6.40 units per square mile (2.47 units/km^{2}). The racial makeup of the township was 95.54% White, 0.79% African American, 0.26% Native American, 0.13% Asian, 0.00% Pacific Islander, 0.13% from other races, and 3.15% from two or more races. Hispanic or Latino of any race were 0.92% of the population.

There were 319 households, out of which 27.00% had children under the age of 18 living with them, 59.25% were married couples living together, 0.00% had a female householder with no spouse present, and 32.29% were non-families. 28.80% of all households were made up of individuals, and 16.90% had someone living alone who was 65 years of age or older. The average household size was 2.55 and the average family size was 2.74.

The township's age distribution consisted of 27.8% under the age of 18, 5.0% from 18 to 24, 14% from 25 to 44, 28.6% from 45 to 64, and 24.6% who were 65 years of age or older. The median age was 51.0 years. For every 100 females, there were 71.7 males. For every 100 females age 18 and over, there were 88.4 males.

The median income for a household in the township was $78,295, and the median income for a family was $87,361. Males had a median income of $28,456 versus $29,091 for females. The per capita income for the township was $45,042. About 5.1% of families and 7.9% of the population were below the poverty line, including none of those under age 18 and 16.5% of those age 65 or over.

Historical population
Census	Pop.	Note	%±
2010	919		—
2020	763		−17.0%
U.S. Decennial Census

== School districts ==
- Casey-Westfield Community Unit School District 4c
- Charleston Community Unit School District 1

== Political districts ==
- Illinois' 15th congressional district
- State House District 110
- State Senate District 55
