= Fox Ridge State Park =

State park in Coles County, Illinois

- IUCN category III (natural monument or feature)
- Location within Illinois Location within the United States
- Location: Coles County, Illinois, USA
- Nearest city: Charleston, Illinois
- Coordinates: 39°24′12″N 88°09′11″W
- Area: 2,064 acres (835 ha)
- Established: 1930s
- Governing body: Illinois Department of Natural Resources

Fox Ridge State Park is an Illinois state park on 2,064 acres (835 ha) in Coles County, Illinois, United States. The State of Illinois took over ownership of the park sometime in the 1930s.
