= National Register of Historic Places listings in Coles County, Illinois =

Location of Coles County in Illinois

This is a list of the National Register of Historic Places listings in Coles County, Illinois.

This is intended to be a complete list of the properties and districts on the National Register of Historic Places in Coles County, Illinois, United States. Latitude and longitude coordinates are provided for many National Register properties and districts; these locations may be seen together in a map.

There are 21 properties and districts listed on the National Register in the county. Another three properties were once listed but have been removed.

This National Park Service list is complete through NPS recent listings posted July 31, 2026.

== Current listings ==
	Name on the Register	Image	Date listed	Location	City or town	Description
1	Airtight Bridge	Airtight Bridge	November 30, 1981 (#81000211)	Northeast of Charleston; 39°33′18″N 88°05′22″W	Charleston	
2	Blakeman Bridge	Blakeman Bridge	November 30, 1981 (#81000212)	Southeast of Charleston; 39°27′25″N 88°08′49″W	Charleston	
3	Alexander Briggs House	Alexander Briggs House	May 31, 1980 (#80001341)	210 Jackson St. 39°29′38″N 88°10′45″W	Charleston	
4	Burgess-Osborne Memorial Auditorium	Burgess-Osborne Memorial Auditorium	March 5, 2018 (#100002149)	1701 Wabash Ave. 39°28′50″N 88°22′32″W	Mattoon	
5	Civilian Conservation Corps Camp Shiloh Encampment Site	Civilian Conservation Corps Camp Shiloh Encampment Site	January 22, 2014 (#13001110)	Northwestern quarter of the northeastern quarter of the southwestern quarter of Section 21, Township 11 North, Range 9 East, of the Illinois Third Principal Meridian; 39°22′52″N 88°12′34″W	Pleasant Grove Township	
6	Coles County Courthouse	Coles County Courthouse	November 28, 1978 (#78001118)	Charleston Public Sq. 39°29′42″N 88°10′30″W	Charleston	
7	Fifteenth Street and Oklahoma Avenue Brick Street	Fifteenth Street and Oklahoma Avenue Brick Street	November 22, 1999 (#99001357)	500 through 1217 15th St. and 1500 through 1521 Oklahoma Ave. 39°28′30″N 88°22′21″W	Mattoon	
8	Health Education Building	Health Education Building	August 9, 1995 (#95000993)	1611 4th St. 39°28′54″N 88°10′35″W	Charleston	
9	Illinois Central Railroad Depot	Illinois Central Railroad Depot	March 1, 2002 (#02000098)	1718 Broadway Ave. 39°28′59″N 88°22′33″W	Mattoon	
10	Lumpkin Heights and Elm Ridge Subdivision Historic District	Lumpkin Heights and Elm Ridge Subdivision Historic District	December 26, 2017 (#100001921)	Roughly bounded by Logan & 6th Sts., Lafayette & Charleston Aves., & Elm Ridge Subdivision; 39°28′49″N 88°21′22″W	Mattoon	
11	McFarland House	McFarland House	November 14, 1991 (#91001690)	895 7th St. 39°29′25″N 88°10′25″W	Charleston	
12	Old Main	Old Main	June 16, 1981 (#81000214)	Lincoln Ave. and 7th St. 39°29′03″N 88°10′31″W	Charleston	
13	Pemberton Hall and Gymnasium	Pemberton Hall and Gymnasium	August 26, 1982 (#82002521)	Lincoln Ave. and 4th St. 39°29′01″N 88°10′35″W	Charleston	
14	Richard Roytek House	Richard Roytek House	February 22, 2011 (#11000030)	3420 Richmond Ave. 39°29′08″N 88°24′00″W	Mattoon	
15	Dr. Hiram Rutherford House and Office	Dr. Hiram Rutherford House and Office	June 3, 1982 (#82002523)	14 S. Pike St. 39°39′15″N 88°01′38″W	Oakland	
16	Sixth, Seventh, and Tenth Street Stone Arch Bridges	Sixth, Seventh, and Tenth Street Stone Arch Bridges	August 8, 2001 (#01000869)	700 blocks of 6th, 7th, and 10th Sts. 39°29′33″N 88°10′27″W	Charleston	
17	Starr Hotel	Starr Hotel	August 16, 1994 (#94000975)	1913-1923 Western Ave. 39°28′59″N 88°22′44″W	Mattoon	
18	Stone Quarry Bridge	Stone Quarry Bridge	November 30, 1981 (#81000215)	Northeast of Charleston; 39°31′16″N 88°06′36″W	Charleston	
19	U.S. Post Office	U.S. Post Office	December 6, 1979 (#79000818)	1701 Charleston Ave. 39°28′53″N 88°22′32″W	Mattoon	
20	Unity Church	Unity Church	March 19, 1982 (#82002522)	2200 Western Ave. 39°29′00″N 88°22′55″W	Mattoon	
21	Will Rogers Theatre and Commercial Block	Will Rogers Theatre and Commercial Block	January 12, 1984 (#84001066)	705-715 Monroe Ave. 39°29′43″N 88°10′28″W	Charleston	

== Former listing ==
	Name on the Register	Image	Date listed	Date removed	Location	City or town	Description
1	Cleveland, Cincinnati, Chicago and St. Louis Railroad Station		January 30, 1986 (#86000135)	August 14, 2004	1632 Broadway Ave.	Mattoon	
2	Harrison St. Bridge	Harrison St. Bridge	November 30, 1981 (#81000213)	January 6, 2020	East of Charleston; 39°29′21″N 88°06′48″W	Charleston	Demolished in 2011.
3	Railway Express Agency Building	Railway Express Agency Building	August 16, 1994 (#94000974)	January 2, 2020	1804 Western Ave. 39°28′59″N 88°22′36″W	Mattoon	Demolished in 2013.

== See also ==
- List of National Historic Landmarks in Illinois
- National Register of Historic Places listings in Illinois
