= McFarland House =

McFarland House or MacFarland House may refer to:

== Canada ==
- McFarland House, Niagara-on-the-Lake, built 1800 and managed by the Niagara Parks Commission

== United States ==
(by state)

- MacFarland House (Stanford, California), listed on the NRHP in Santa Clara County, California
- McFarland-Render House, La Grange, Georgia, listed on the NRHP in Troup County, Georgia
- McFarland House (Charleston, Illinois), listed on the NRHP in Coles County, Illinois
- McFarland House (Georgetown, Kentucky), listed on the NRHP in Scott County, Kentucky
- Mundy-McFarland House, Mansfield, Louisiana, listed on the NRHP in De Sota Parish, Louisiana
- William McFarland House, Worcester, Massachusetts, NRHP-listed
- William and Margaret McFarland Core Farm, Bingham Township, Leelanau County, Michigan, listed on the NRHP in Leelanau County, Michigan
- Duncan McFarland House, Bentleyville, Ohio, listed on the NRHP in Cuyahoga County, Ohio
- McCracken-McFarland House, Cambridge, Ohio, NRHP-listed
- James McFarland House, Mount Vernon, Ohio, listed on the NRHP in Knox County, Ohio
- Eddleman-McFarland House, Fort Worth, Texas, listed on the NRHP in Tarrant County, Texas
- MacFarland House (Charleston, West Virginia), NRHP-listed in Kanawha County
- McFarland House (McFarland, Wisconsin), listed on the NRHP in Dane County, Wisconsin
