= WLBH =

WLBH may refer to:

- WLBH (AM), a defunct radio station (1170 AM) formerly licensed to serve Mattoon, Illinois, United States
- WLBH-FM, a defunct radio station (96.9 FM) formerly licensed to serve Mattoon, Illinois, United States
