= Cross County Mall (Illinois) =

Coordinates: 39.484453°N 88.343141°W

- Interior of the mall looking east toward Rural King, September 2026
- Location: Mattoon, Illinois, United States
- Address: 700 Broadway Avenue East
- Opened: 1971
- Developer: Chananie Development
- Owner: Rural King Realty
- Num. of stores: 22 total 18 (inside the mall); 4 (outside the mall)
- Num. of anchor tenants: 5 (4 open, 1 vacant)
- Floor area: 338,100 square feet (31,410 m^{2})
- Floors: 1
- Public transit: Coles County Zipline
- Website: http://www.crosscountymall.com

Cross County Mall is a shopping mall in Mattoon, Illinois, U.S. It was opened in 1971 with JCPenney, G. C. Murphy, IGA, Arlan's, and Myers Brothers, with Sears joining in 1972. Following the closure of Arlan's in 1973, the space became Kmart one year later. G. C. Murphy became Meis, Elder-Beerman, and then Carson's, while Kmart moved out of the mall in 1993 and became a larger Sears store. The Sears closed in 2014 and became a Rural King in 2019. Following the closures of Carson's and JCPenney in 2018 and 2020 respectively, the mall's anchors are Rural King, Marshalls, and Dunham's Sports. Rural King also owns the mall.

== History ==
Chahanie Development announced the shopping center in 1967 and began construction in 1969. The first announced tenants were JCPenney, G. C. Murphy variety store, Arlan's discount store, Walgreens, an IGA supermarket, and Kinney Shoes.

Official opening ceremonies were held in October 1971, by which point many stores were already open. Both IGA and a branch of the Springfield, Illinois-based department store Myers Brothers opened on October 27. Sears joined the mall in 1972.

After Arlan's declared bankruptcy in 1973, their store closed and was converted to Kmart the following year. According to mall developers, this made Cross County Mall the first shopping center in the nation to include JCPenney, Sears, and Kmart, then the nation's three largest retailers. G. C. Murphy closed in 1976 and work began that year to convert the space to Meis, a department store based out of Terre Haute, Indiana. The Meis store opened in 1978. The same year, Bergner's purchased the Myers Brothers chain and converted all stores to the Bergner's name.

Rural King, pictured in September 2026, is one of the mall's anchor stores.

By 1981, the IGA space on the southeast end of the mall had been vacated; its location was converted into a new mall hallway. This venture proved unsuccessful; by 1988, the mall owners had attempted to turn the space into a food court. At the time, the only food options in the mall were a sandwich shop and a restaurant located inside Kmart, as Walgreens had removed its in-store diner around the same time. The food court was unable to attract restaurants, so the space was converted to an antique mall in 1990.

Meis was bought out by Elder-Beerman in mid-1989. Bergner's closed at the mall after the Christmas 1989 shopping season, due to the space being too small for a full-line department store. Maurices and other stores repurposed the former Bergner's space.

=== 1990s onward ===
Kmart moved to a larger store outside the mall in 1993; one year later, Sears moved from its existing location to the former Kmart. Soon afterward, the original Sears building became Wolf Furniture. The space was later a medical training center, and became the offices for the city's newspaper. Walgreens moved out of the mall in 2003. In 2011, Elder-Beerman was rebranded as Carson's. In September 2011 Borders bookstore closed. Sears closed at the mall in late 2014.

Major tenants in the mall as of 2014 included Jo-Ann Fabrics, Bath & Body Works, Maurices, Christopher & Banks, Claire's, rue21, GNC and Shoe Dept. On March 26, 2016, RadioShack closed its doors.

In 2017, the farming supply retail chain Rural King acquired the mall and announced plans to move a store support center into the former Sears. On April 18, 2018, it was announced that Carson's would be closing on August 31, 2018, as parent company The Bon-Ton Stores went out of business. This left JCPenney as the only traditional anchor until January 16, 2019, when Rural King opened in the former Sears. On July 2, 2018, a new 11 for $10 store opened in the former Hallmark space in the mall; it would later close less than a year after being open, closing in June 2019. On July 12, 2018, Rural King announced they would move their Mattoon store into the former Sears location which opened on January 16, 2019.

On August 31, 2018, Super Jumbo Buffet Chinese restaurant closed and was replaced by Scotty's Brewhouse which opened December 10, 2018. This space was briefly tenanted by Scotty's Brewhouse for almost one year before its doors closed in late 2019. McQuarter's Pub now occupies the space. In the spring of 2019 Payless ShoeSource closed as the company announced it would close all of its locations. Marshalls moved in to the mall and opened November 24, 2019. On March 18, 2020, Glik's returned to the mall and opened in the former 11 for $10 store location.

On December 17, 2020, it was announced that JCPenney would be closing in March 2021 as part of a plan to close 15 stores nationwide. The former JCPenney would become Dunham sports at some point.
