= WLBH-FM =

Radio station in Mattoon, Illinois (1949–2018)

- Mattoon, Illinois; United States
- Broadcast area: Mattoon, Illinois; Charleston, Illinois; Effingham, Illinois
- Frequency: 96.9 MHz

Programming
- Format: Defunct

Ownership
- Owner: James R. Livesay II; (Mattoon Broadcasting Company)
- Sister stations: WLBH

History
- First air date: August 1949

Technical information
- Facility ID: 40703
- Class: B
- ERP: 50,000 watts
- HAAT: 500 feet

WLBH-FM (96.9 FM) was a radio station licensed to Mattoon, Illinois, United States. The station began broadcasting in August 1949, and originally had an ERP of 23 kW at an HAAT of 190 feet. In 1974, the station's ERP was increased to 50,000 watts at an HAAT of 500 feet. The station was originally owned by James Ray Livesay, and was later owned by his son James R. Livesay II.

The station had long aired a beautiful music format. On October 16, 1995, the station switched to an adult contemporary format, branded "Lite 97". Shortly thereafter, the station's branding was changed to "Magic 97". The station would continue airing an adult contemporary format into the 2000s.

WLBH-FM's licensed was cancelled in 2018, after having been off the air for an indeterminate amount of time, following a break-in at the station's transmitter site which occurred on December 14, 2017, in which the station's transmitter was destroyed and broadcasting equipment was stolen.
