= Rural King =

American retail chain

Rural King Supply

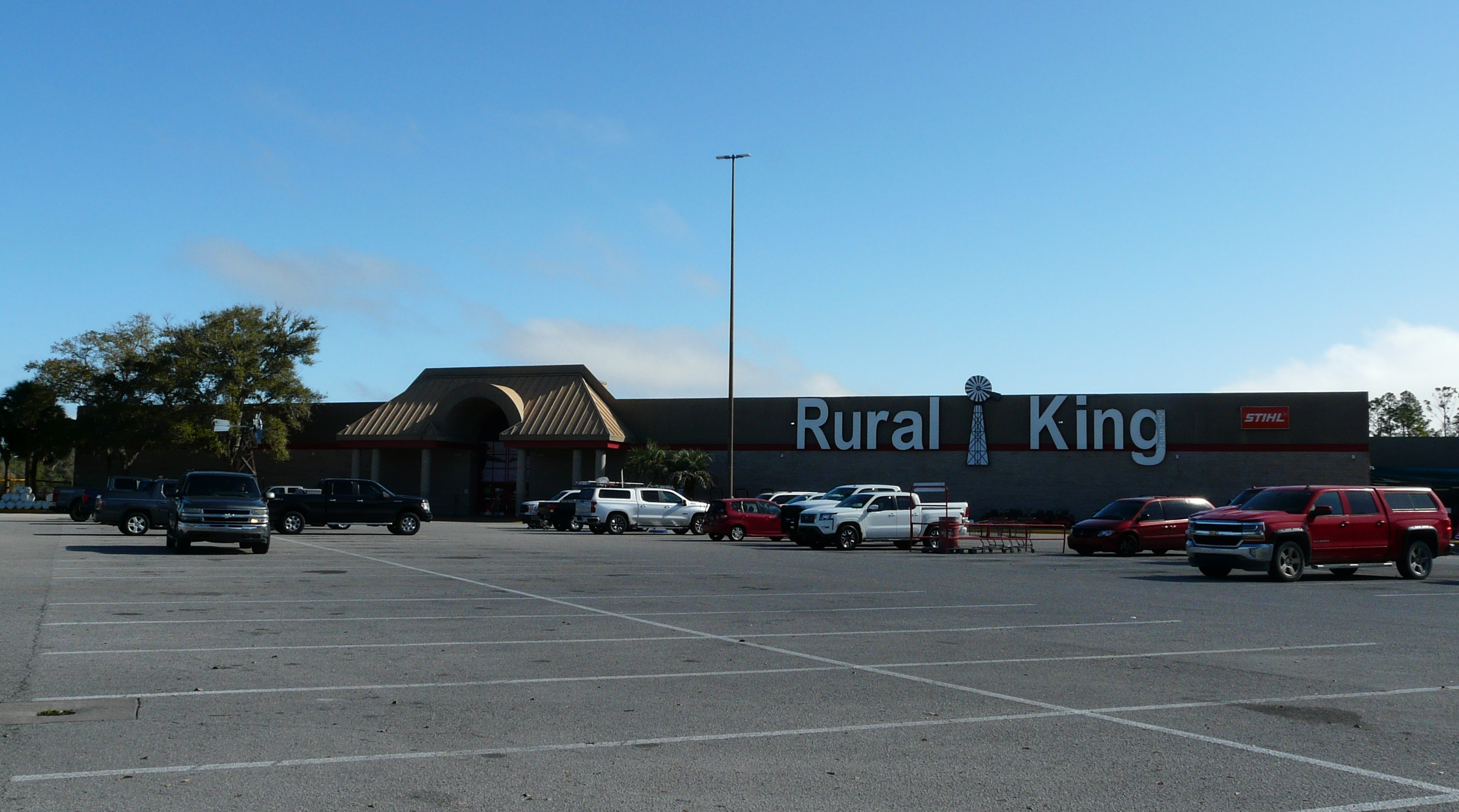
- location in Crystal River, Florida
- Trade name: Rural King
- Type: Private
- Industry: Retail
- Founded: 1960 (66 years ago) Mattoon, Illinois, U.S.
- Founder: Kermit Speer; Keith Beaird
- Headquarters: Mattoon, Illinois, U.S.
- Number of locations: 135 (2024)
- Area served: Alabama, Florida, Georgia, Illinois, Indiana, Kentucky, Tennessee, Ohio, Maryland, Michigan, Mississippi, Missouri, New York, North Carolina, Pennsylvania, South Carolina, Virginia, and West Virginia
- Key people: Steve Barbarick President and CEO
- Products: Automotive supplies, clothing and accessories, equine and pet supplies, live chicks and rabbits, hunting/fishing equipment and supplies, firearms and ammunition, tractor/trailer parts and accessories, lawn and garden supplies, sprinkler/irrigation parts, power tools, fencing, welding and pump supplies, riding mowers
- Revenue: ▲US$ 1.5 billion (2022)
- Owner: Alex Melvin
- Number of employees: 6,400 (2021)
- Website: ruralking.com

Rural King Supply is a farm supply store based in Mattoon, Illinois, United States. Rural King was founded in 1960. As of 2024, the chain has 135 stores in the U.S. states of Alabama, Florida, Georgia, Illinois, Indiana, Kentucky, Tennessee, Ohio, Maryland, Michigan, Mississippi, Missouri, New York, North Carolina, Pennsylvania, South Carolina, Virginia, and West Virginia. The company has expressed interest in opening stores in Arkansas. The company also operates an online store, as well as offering an online gun store.

== History ==
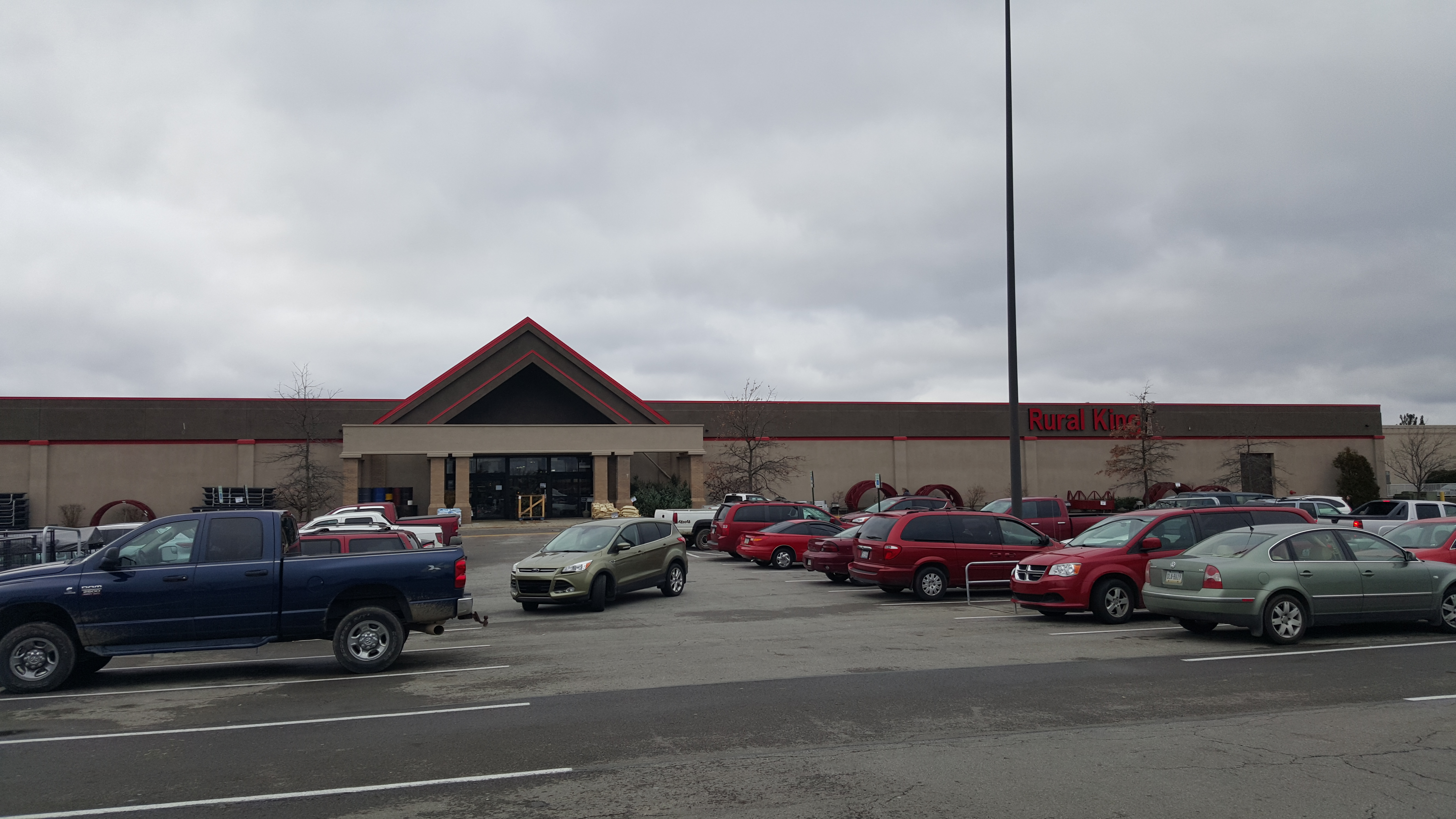
Typical Rural King location at the Clearview Mall in Butler, Pennsylvania.

On June 5, 1960, Kermit Speer and Keith Beaird founded Rural King Supply in Mattoon. The original store was started in a former implement building of 7,200 square feet.

The company started with two employees, besides the owners. In 1963, an addition to the main building was added. In 1966, a warehouse was built, and in 1970, a second addition was added to the store.

A new building was finished and opened in September 1976. In 1999, a new store, warehouse and corporate office consisting of 210,000 square feet was opened across the highway from the old store. The old store and warehouse were donated to the Catholic Charities.

In 2003, a 94,000-square-foot addition was added to the warehouse. In 2007, another 96,000 square feet were added to the warehouse. In 2010, a third warehouse expansion was started that will add 104,000 square feet.

In 1962, Speer and Beaird opened another store in Paris, Illinois.

The Vandalia, Illinois, Rural King was opened in 1966 in an old building on U.S. Highway 40 East. A new Rural King was built in November 1973 on Van Tran Avenue, which has been renamed Veterans Avenue. An addition to that building was completed in 1983.

In 1979, Gary Melvin, nephew of Kermit Speer, purchased an interest in Rural King. Gary began his career working in the store, learning the products and serving customers.

Bruce Speer, nephew of Kermit Speer, purchased an interest in Rural King in 1982, with the opening of the Litchfield, Ill., store. Bruce began his career as the manager of the Litchfield store. In 1985, he and his family moved to Terre Haute, Ind., where he opened and managed that store for five years. In 1990, Bruce moved to the Mattoon corporate office to help with purchasing and expansion of the Rural King stores.

In December 2015, Rural King announced they had reached, for the first time, $1 billion in total sales.

In 2017, Rural King purchased the Cross County Mall in Mattoon, Illinois. In July 2018, Rural King finalized their plans for the mall and decided to move the Mattoon Rural King store location into the former Sears space to drive more traffic to the mall and other businesses in the area. The location opened January 16, 2019. The previous facility, located at 4216 Dewitt Avenue, will continue to serve as a distribution center, and the headquarters will be expanded into the current Rural King store space.

In 2022, Rural King purchased the former JCPenney anchor space at the Country Club Mall in Cumberland, Maryland and construction started in early 2025 with a completion date slated for October 2025, making it the company’s first store in the state of Maryland.

== Products ==
Rural King sells work clothing and work boots, equine and pet supplies, live chicks and rabbits, hunting/fishing equipment and supplies, firearms and ammunition, tractor/trailer parts and accessories, lawn and garden supplies, sprinkler/irrigation parts, power tools, fencing, welding and pump supplies, riding mowers, agricultural chemicals and many other farm and home supplies. Rural King also sells toys, especially around the holidays. One of Rural King's notable sales tactics is offering free coffee and popcorn to customers inside their stores.
