= Unity Church (Mattoon, Illinois) =

Historic church in Illinois, United States

- U.S. National Register of Historic Places
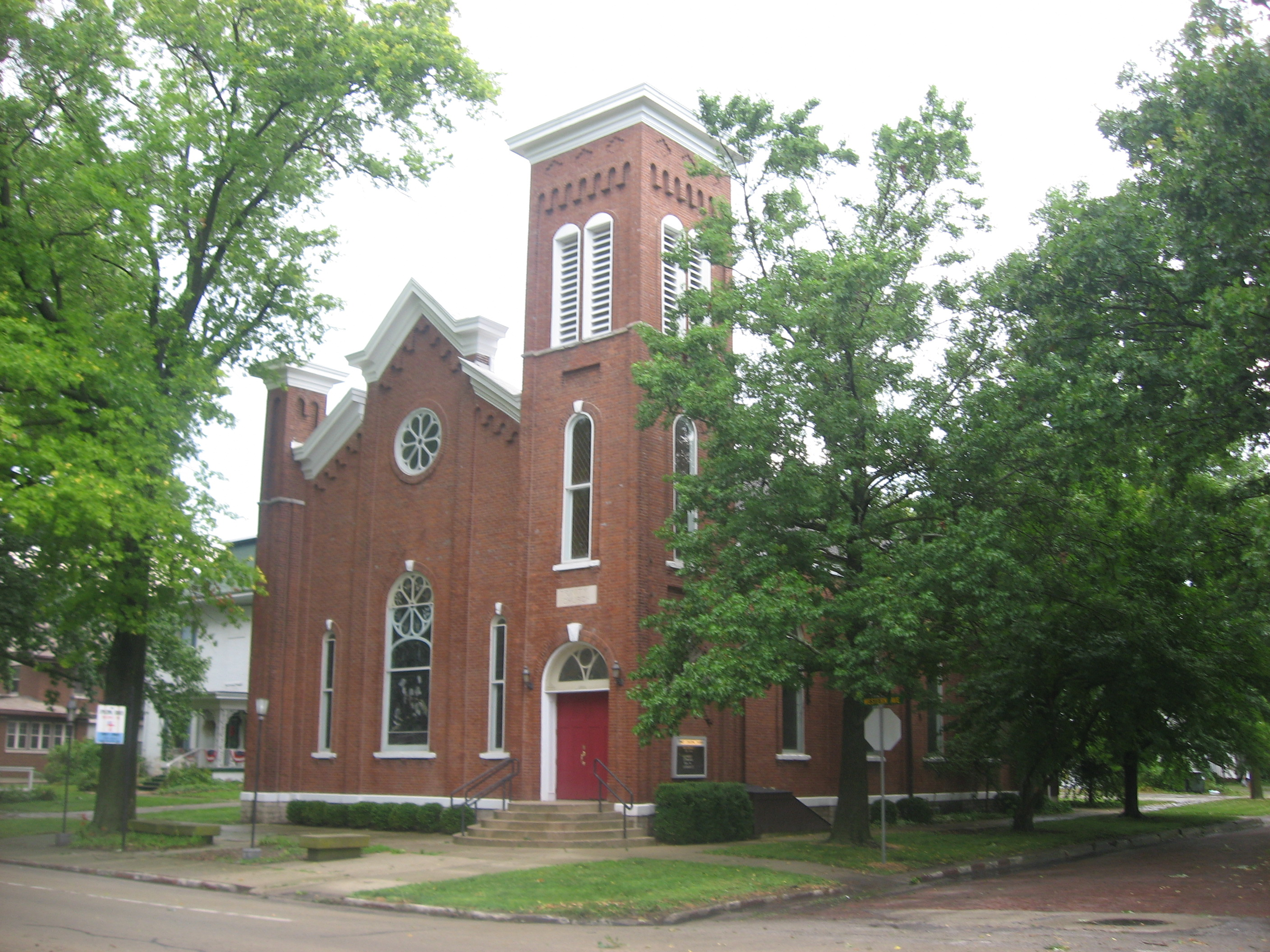

- Location within Illinois Location within the United States
- Location: 220 Western Ave., Mattoon, Illinois
- Coordinates: 39°29′0″N 88°22′55″W
- Area: 0.2 acres (0.081 ha)
- Built: 1872
- NRHP reference No.: 82002522
- Added to NRHP: March 19, 1982

Unity Church, now known as Trinity Episcopal Church, is a historic church located at 2200 Western Avenue in Mattoon, Illinois. Mattoon's Unitarian congregation built the church in 1872. The church was built with red brick with stone decorations and a wooden cornice. A rectangular bell tower stands at the church's southeast corner; the tower is louvered and contains two bells. The church's main entrance is located at the bottom of the tower. The church's nave is on the south side of the church; the nave features a wheel window and a large stained glass window with a wheel and two arches. The top of the nave and bell tower is decorated with corbelled brickwork. Mattoon's Unitarian congregation disbanded in the 1900s, and the church is now occupied by an Episcopal congregation.

The church was added to the National Register of Historic Places on March 19, 1982.
