= Fifteenth Street and Oklahoma Avenue Brick Street =

- U.S. National Register of Historic Places
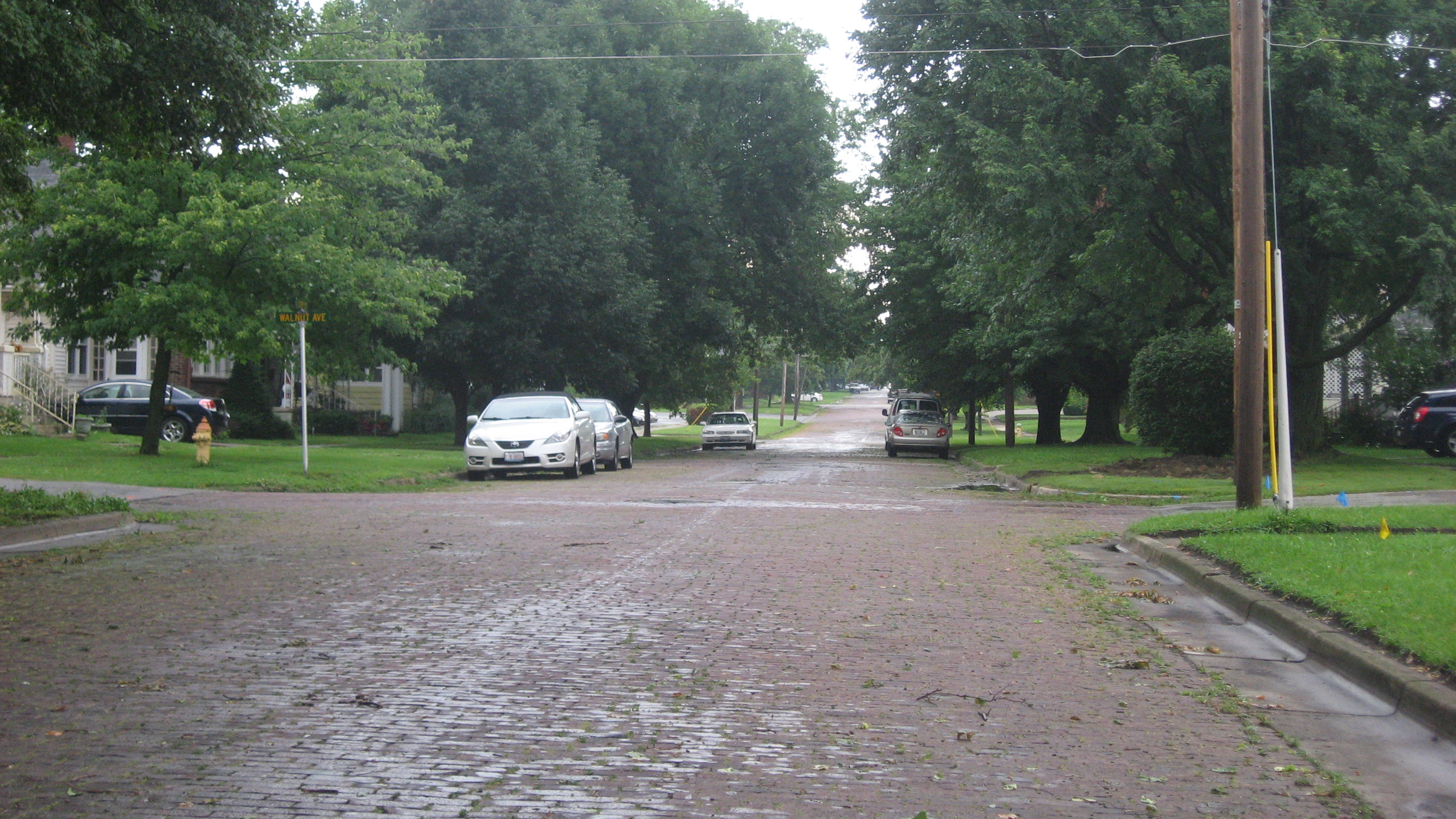
- Fifteenth Street at Walnut Avenue

- Location within Illinois Location within the United States
- Location: 500 through 1217 Fifteenth St. and 1500 through 1521 Oklahoma Ave., Mattoon, Illinois
- Coordinates: 39°28′30″N 88°22′21″W
- Area: 0 acres (0 ha)
- Architectural style: Brick street
- NRHP reference No.: 99001357
- Added to NRHP: November 22, 1999

The Fifteenth Street and Oklahoma Avenue Brick Street is a 4.3-mile (6.9 km) section of brick pavement on Fifteenth Street and Oklahoma Avenue in Mattoon, Illinois. The section of pavement covers eight blocks of Fifteenth Street and one block of Oklahoma Avenue at the south end of the Fifteenth Street section. The H. W. Clark Company paved the streets in 1924. The company first laid a concrete substructure and concrete curbs. An intermediate layer of sand and tar was laid on top of the concrete, and the bricks were placed on top of this layer. The segment of brick street accounts for nearly all of Mattoon's remaining brick streets, as less than 20% of its original 22.1-mile (35.6 km) brick street system has not been paved over with asphalt.

The street was added to the National Register of Historic Places on November 22, 1999.
