= Merab Eberle =

American journalist and writer (1891–1959)

- Merab Eberle, from a 1959 publication
- Born: February 2, 1891; Mattoon, Illinois, U.S.
- Died: October 31, 1959 (aged 68); Dayton, Ohio, U.S.
- Burial place: Franklin, Ohio

Merab Eberle (February 2, 1891 – October 31, 1959) was an American journalist and a writer in several genres, including science fiction and children's plays.

== Early life ==
Merab Shipley Eberle was born in Mattoon, Illinois, the daughter of Homer J. Eberle, a railroad employee, and Olive Rossman Eberle. Her paternal grandfather, Jacob Kauffman Eberle (1824–1902), was a medical doctor. She had the same three names as her paternal grandmother, Merab Shipley Eberle (1826–1888).

Merab Eberle attended Oxford College in Ohio, graduating with honors in 1916.

== Career ==
Plays by Eberle included The Maydew Charm (1918, a fantasy play for May Day children's events), Bobby in Belgium: A Junior Red Cross Play (1918), Capt. Anne of the Red Cross: A Red Cross Comedy for Girls (1918), and The Spirit of Democracy: An Allegorical Pageant (1917). Stories by Merab Eberle included "The Mordant" (Amazing Stories, 1930) and "The Thought Translator" (Wonder Stories, 1930).

She also wrote poetry, and won a prize for her poem "Prayer" in 1930. "Prayer" later became a church hymn. She won another prize for a historical ballad, in 1944. A collection of her poetry, Many Doors, was published posthumously in 1961.

She was a member of the Dayton Women's Club and the Ohio Newspaper Women's Association. From 1930 to 1959, she was a reporter, arts editor and book reviewer for The Dayton Journal Herald. Among the newspaper contributors under her editorial guidance was cartoonist Milton Caniff. "She gave richly of herself, her time and talent in promoting the cause of all the arts in her long career as art, music, and book editor of the Journal Herald", recalled the Dayton Art Institute in a statement after she died. "Her distinctive style enhanced all of her writings, and her deep love, understanding, and compassion for all of the arts helped promote the cause of art in Dayton as few other people have been able to do."

== Personal life ==
Merab Eberle died from a heart attack in 1959, aged 68 years, in Dayton, Ohio. She had worked late at the newspaper until a few hours before she died.
