= Country Club Mall =

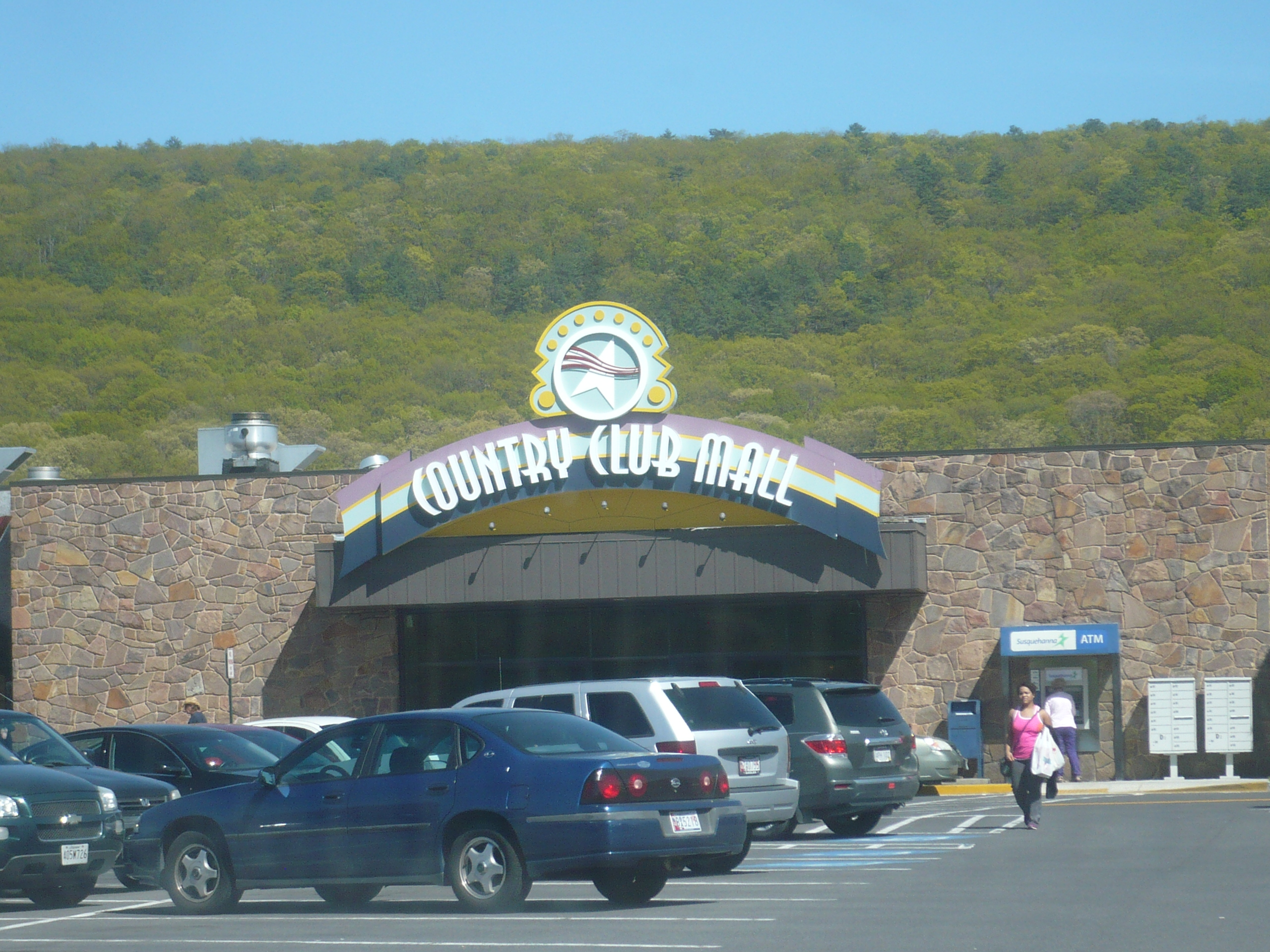
- Country Club Mall Entrance midday
- Location: LaVale, Maryland, United States
- Coordinates: 39°37′35.2″N 78°50′6.8″W
- Address: 1262 Vocke Road #400
- Opened: 1981
- Developer: Shopco Development Company
- Manager: Mason Asset Management
- Owner: Namdar Realty Group
- Num. of stores: 50+ (at peak)
- Num. of anchor tenants: 7 (4 open, 3 vacant)
- Floor area: 600,000 square feet (56,000 m^{2})
- Floors: 1
- Public transit: ACT: Gold, Green, Purple, Silver, Yellow, FSU-E, FSU-S; PVTA: 105
- Website: shopcountryclubmall.com

Country Club Mall is a shopping mall located in LaVale, Maryland, a suburb of Cumberland, Maryland in Allegany County, Maryland. The mall has sixty retail units, as well as seven vendor stands on the main concourse. Located in the Country Club Mall is the Country Club Mall 8 Cinemas, the largest movie theater in Allegany County. The mall is managed by Namdar Realty Group. The mall's anchor stores are Ulta Beauty, Walmart Supercenter, Country Club Mall 8 Cinemas, and Rural King. There are 2 vacant anchor stores that were once Sears and The Bon-Ton. Rural King replaced the vacant JCPenney space in October 2025.

== History ==
The mall was built after the state of Maryland spent $12 million on a road that facilitated the region's growth. This is believed to have led to the closings of smaller stores in Cumberland. The 64-acre (260,000 m^{2}) property is a portion of a larger 192-acre (0.78 km^{2}) parcel. Before 1979, most of the 192-acre (0.78 km^{2}) parcel, including portions of the 64-acre (260,000 m^{2}) subject property, was used for strip mining and a golf course. The strip mine was filled in 1979, and the shopping center was built in 1981. When the mall opened, it contained a Kmart, JCPenney and Eyerly's, which was eventually replaced by Bon-Ton. Sears opened about a year later, and Kmart closed in 2002 and was replaced by a Walmart Supercenter in 2004. By September 2004, the mall was 527,000 square feet (49,000 m^{2}) in size. As of May 2013, the mall is 600,000 square feet (56,000 m^{2}). On April 18, 2018, The Bon-Ton Stores announced it would close all stores, including the Bon-Ton store at Country Club Mall. The store closed on August 29, 2018. On November 7, 2019, it was announced that Sears would be closing this location a part of a plan to close 96 stores nationwide. The store closed in February 2020. On June 4, 2020, JCPenney announced that it would close by around October 2020 as part of a plan to close 154 stores nationwide. After JCPenney closed, TJ Maxx, Walmart Supercenter, and Country Club Mall 8 Cinemas were the only anchor stores left. In March 2025, Rural King started construction on a new store in the former JCPenney space and the store opened on October 30, 2025, giving the mall a new anchor tenant. On May 2, 2026, TJMaxx closed due to ongoing and unresolved air conditioning failures.

== Management ==
Country Club Mall was developed in 1981 by Shopco Development Company of New York City. The mall was acquired by the Edward J. DeBartolo Corporation in the late 1980s and Compass Retail, Inc. in 1993. In January 1999, J.J. Gumberg Properties purchased the Country Club Mall for $32.4 million. Brad Kotz of KLNB Inc. represented the seller, Lend Lease Real Estate Investments, in the sale to J.J. Gumberg.

The new owners, who purchased the mall at auction, are the Namdar Realty Group and Mason Asset Management, both of Great Neck, New York. Namdar Realty will operate the mall while Mason Asset Management will “oversee” all leasing efforts.

== Surrounding area ==
Country Club Mall is located in Allegany County in Western Maryland. The mall attracts residents from numerous counties in Maryland, Pennsylvania and West Virginia. It is the only enclosed shopping mall within 65 miles (105 km). It is located right off of Interstate 68 on Vocke Road. The property is bound to the south and west by restaurants, hotels, and commercial establishments, and undeveloped land to the north and east.

== Cinemas ==
There is an eight-screen movie theater space at the mall. Over time, the management of the theater has changed. AMC Theatres used to manage the theaters. Under AMC, the space was a six-screen movie theater and it was called AMC Country Club Mall 6. AMC ended operation on July 17, 2011, after deciding not to renew the lease, which ended on July 31, 2011. Immediately after, WPA Theaters became the company managing the movie theater in early August 2011. The company increased the screen count to eight, and the theater's name changed to the current Country Club 8 Cinemas. WPA's plan was to keep the same staff and managers who worked at AMC.

== Crime and incidents ==
- A man scammed a 71-year-old man out of an undisclosed amount of money at JC Penney's on May 14, 2012. The criminal posed as an undercover police officer and convinced the elderly man to give him money instead of going in front of a judge. Video surveillance caught the criminal's identity.
- A deer visited Barbara's Hallmark store on December 15, 2012. No injuries were reported, but a few items got knocked down. Employees shut the front gate of the store to coax the deer to the back. The deer left through the back door after a few minutes.

== Public transportation ==
Allegany County Transit and the Potomac Valley Transit Authority provide bus service to the mall. Many of the lines stop by the mall and Walmart. ACT Morning service, Green, Gold, Purple, Evening Service, and PVTA Route 105 have a destination at the mall. Some buses for Frostburg State University bring students to the mall.
