= Omega Trust =

American bank fraud

Omega Trust & Trading Ltd.
- Company type: Private
- Industry: Financial services
- Founded: 1994
- Founder: Clyde Hood
- Defunct: 2000
- Fate: Shut down following criminal investigation
- Headquarters: United States
- Key people: Clyde Hood
- Products: Investment programs (fraudulent)

Omega Trust & Trading Ltd. was an American company that engaged in prime bank fraud from 1994 to 2000. The organization was created by retired electrician Clyde Hood, who presented it as an offshore investment program offering complex financial instruments with a payout of 50-to-1 or more. In 2001 Hood pleaded guilty to charges stemming from the scheme, and admitted that Omega investors could never have received the profits that they had been promised.

Although there were many prime bank scams in 1990s, Omega is set apart by the enduring faith of victims that they would receive a return on their investment, even after Hood's arrest. When federal authorities offered restitution to an estimated 10,000 victims, many declined for fear of disqualifying themselves from receiving Omega's long-awaited payout.

== Background ==
Clyde Hood was a lifelong resident of Mattoon, Illinois, where he worked as an electrician. In December 1990 he was indicted in Pike County, Indiana in connection with a fraudulent scheme to sell overseas oil futures. The case was dismissed when Hood refused to appear before the court.

According to court testimony, Hood and his "mentor" traveled to Oregon in the early 1990s, where he met some of the con artists running the first prime bank scams. The term "prime bank" has no real meaning, except to create the appearance that the scam involves special financial institutions and programs that would normally only be available to the wealthy. A typical prime bank pitch involves discounted debentures, "prime bank notes", or other financial instruments that are purportedly too complex for investors to understand.

== The scam ==
In Hood's version of the prime bank scam, Omega offered a "private party loan agreement" wherein the victim would "lend" $100 to a prime bank, and receive a lump-sum payout of $5,000 (in addition to the original $100) in September 1994. A "roll program" would be offered so that participants could reinvest their profits up to three times, resulting in a total return of $765,000. Hood claimed to be one of "only seven people, possibly eight, in the world" qualified to manage these instruments.

Using affinity fraud tactics, Hood initially targeted church groups, claiming that the Holy Spirit led him to "fill the Lord's warehouse" by sharing his good fortune with Christians. Omega also claimed that only a limited number of $100 "units" would be made available, and sales would shut down in August 1994. This helped to persuade victims that the program was not simply an open-ended scam to make as much money as possible.

To expand the reach of the scheme, Hood hired network marketers to both sell his product and recruit additional sellers. Consequently, the details of the scheme expanded beyond Hood's original plan. One Omega solicitor, Michael Kodosky, continued to sell units after the August 1994 deadline, claiming that "refund units" had become available, and inflating the 50-to-1 payout to whatever amount potential customers wanted to hear. Whereas Hood avoided selling units to his local community in Mattoon, marketer Arlene Diamond had no such compunction. Diamond also recommended that clients send payments in cash wrapped in aluminum foil, to avoid scrutiny from postal inspectors.

On September 1, 1994, Hood met with Omega lenders in Portland, Oregon, to answer questions and provide information on when payouts would be received. Hood claimed to be leaving for Zürich the following day to complete the transactions, and that the three rollovers would be completed by the end of the year. By 1995, however, Omega was fielding enough questions about the payout that Hood set up a telephone line that played pre-recorded updates. At least 72 different messages were recorded for the service, often assuring clients that the payouts were imminent. Excuses for the delay ranged from "some unforeseen international financial conflict" to "the greed, the jealousy, the desire for power" of Omega's own clients.

With the money Hood and his associates bought land and businesses in Mattoon, gave no-interest loans and made trips to Europe. Some of the money also went to finance businesses of other Hood associates like construction contractor Chris Engel.

== Arrests and aftermath ==
Clyde Hood and 18 of his associates were indicted in August 2000. Some of them pleaded guilty or were convicted of multiple counts of fraud, mail fraud, money laundering and filing a false tax return (see 26 U.S.C. § 7206).

Engel later cooperated with the police and let them tape a phone conversation with Hood. Hood lawyer Steve Ryan was also later removed from the case when he was subpoenaed as a witness and for possible collusion.

=== Legal proceedings ===
On April 10, 2001, Hood pleaded guilty to mail or wire fraud conspiracy, money laundering conspiracy, and filing a false tax return. On January 18, 2002, he was sentenced to 14 years in prison, to be followed with three years of supervised release, and a fine of $5000. Hood died on July 24, 2012.

Five of his associates were convicted of active participation of the scheme and were ordered to make restitution. Thirteen associates were convicted of money laundering. Three hundred fifty-five victims received restitution from forfeited Omega Trust funds to the total of $1,697,310.00.

== Related activities ==
Omega Trust inspired similar schemes, either to offer similar phony debentures or to propose a new path to securing the payout promised in the original scam. Clyde Hood testified that he was aware of imitators who copied his methods without sending him any money.

Programs known as "Alpha" and "Destiny" were circulating as early as 1998. The anti-fraud website Quatloos.com speculated that Alpha and Destiny were "probably run by the same people" as Omega. Following the arrests of Hood and his associates, an email from "Alpha/Destiny Commission" disavowed any connection to Omega and assured lenders that funding would begin soon.

Many students in Ramtha's School of Enlightenment in Yelm, Washington, sent money to Omega, although leader J. Z. Knight did not endorse or promote the program. In 1998, Yelm resident and former Ramtha student Shaini Goodwin learned of Omega from a friend, and purchased two units. By November 1999 she was posting reports on the Internet under the pseudonym "Dove of Oneness", identifying as an Omega investor who awaited her "propserity deliveries" from the program. As Omega lenders became more conspiratorial and paranoid about the delay of their payouts, Goodwin's "information" about Omega grew popular. By 2000, she attributed the Omega delays to a conflict between "White Knights" and "the dark agenda". After the August 2000 indictments, Goodwin assured her followers that Omega payouts would eventually succeed despite the court case case. She warned that lenders who cooperated with the investigation could lose their payout.

Goodwin asserted that Omega was one of 50 "prosperity programs" that would deliver payouts after the conflict was resolved. To explain this eventual triumph, she co-opted NESARA, a law proposed in 1996 by Harvey Barnard. Although Barnard's bill had never been sponsored by a member of Congress, Goodwin claimed it had been secretly passed in March 2000, but a gag order prevented anyone from enforcing or acknowledging it. Goodwin said that NESARA would forgive all loans and eliminate taxes; when Barnard publicly rejected her misrepresentation of his proposals, she suggested that he was merely obeying the gag order.

Hours after the September 11 attacks, Goodwin claimed that the World Trade Center had been targeted by "U.S. citizens who are trying to stop our deliveries/funding and NESARA". The conspiracy theory drew a new audience to Goodwin and her claims. Goodwin's version of NESARA has sustained hope in Clyde Hood's original Omega claims well into the 2020s.
