= Lumpkin Heights and Elm Ridge Subdivision Historic District =

Historic district in Illinois, United States

- U.S. National Register of Historic Places
- U.S. Historic district
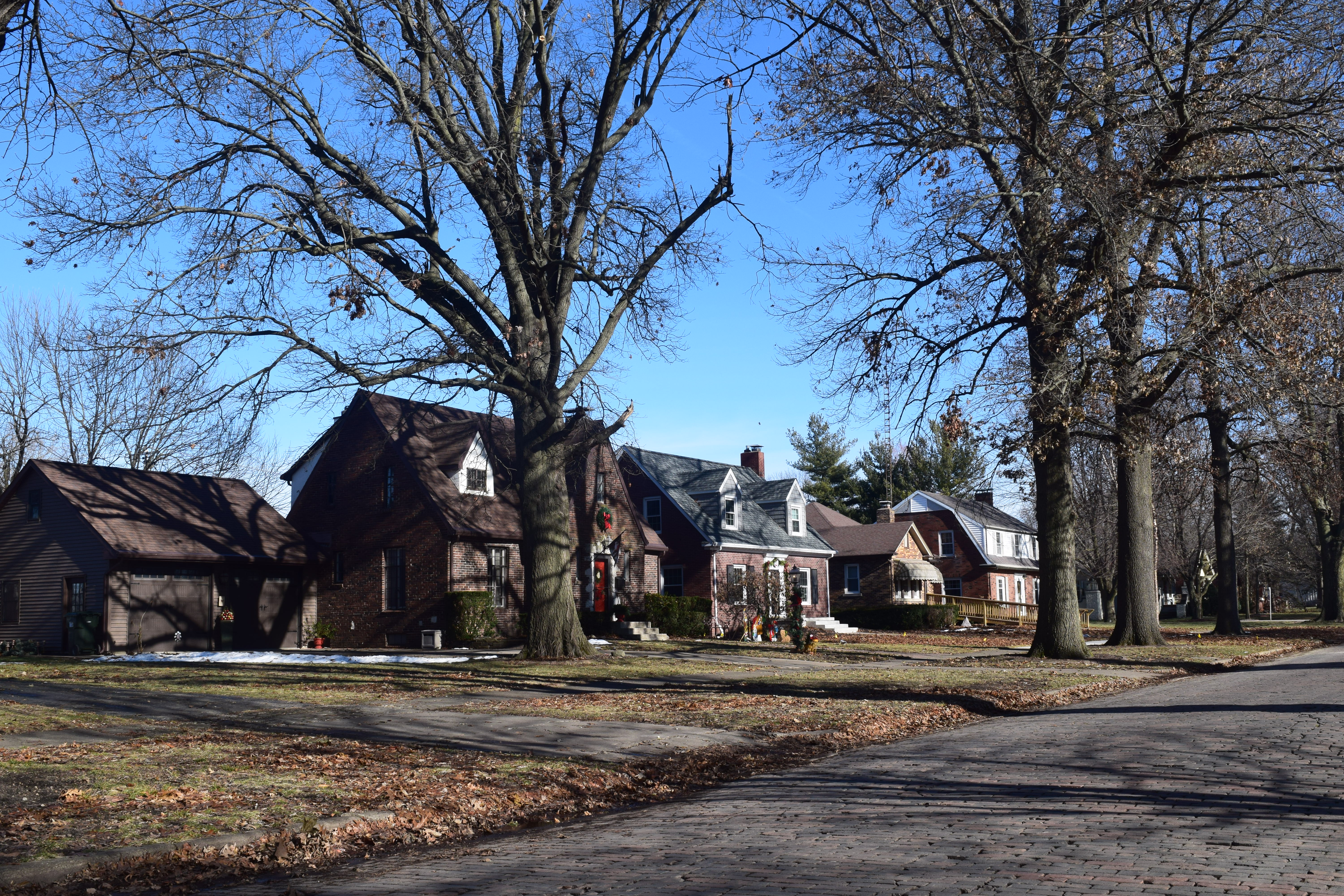
- Houses on Wabash Avenue in the district

- Location within Illinois Location within the United States
- Location: Roughly bounded by Logan & 6th Sts., Lafayette & Charleston Aves., & Elm Ridge Subdivision, Mattoon, Illinois
- Coordinates: 39°28′49″N 88°21′22″W
- NRHP reference No.: 100001921
- Added to NRHP: December 26, 2017

The Lumpkin Heights and Elm Ridge Subdivision Historic District is a residential historic district in Mattoon, Illinois. The district encompasses the Lumpkin Heights and Elm Ridge Subdivision neighborhoods in eastern Mattoon. Lumpkin Heights was originally developed as Lafayette Heights in the late nineteenth and early twentieth centuries, and it only became known by its current name after further development in the mid-twentieth century. The Elm Ridge Subdivision was developed entirely within the mid-twentieth century. The original Lafayette Heights section of the district includes examples of many popular architectural styles from the time of its development, with several examples of Colonial Revival, Tudor Revival, and American Craftsman designs. The remainder of the district exhibits trends common in post-World War II residential development, including several Modernist designs, Ranch-style houses, and prefabricated homes.

The district was added to the National Register of Historic Places on December 26, 2017.
