= Burgess-Osborne Memorial Auditorium =

- U.S. National Register of Historic Places
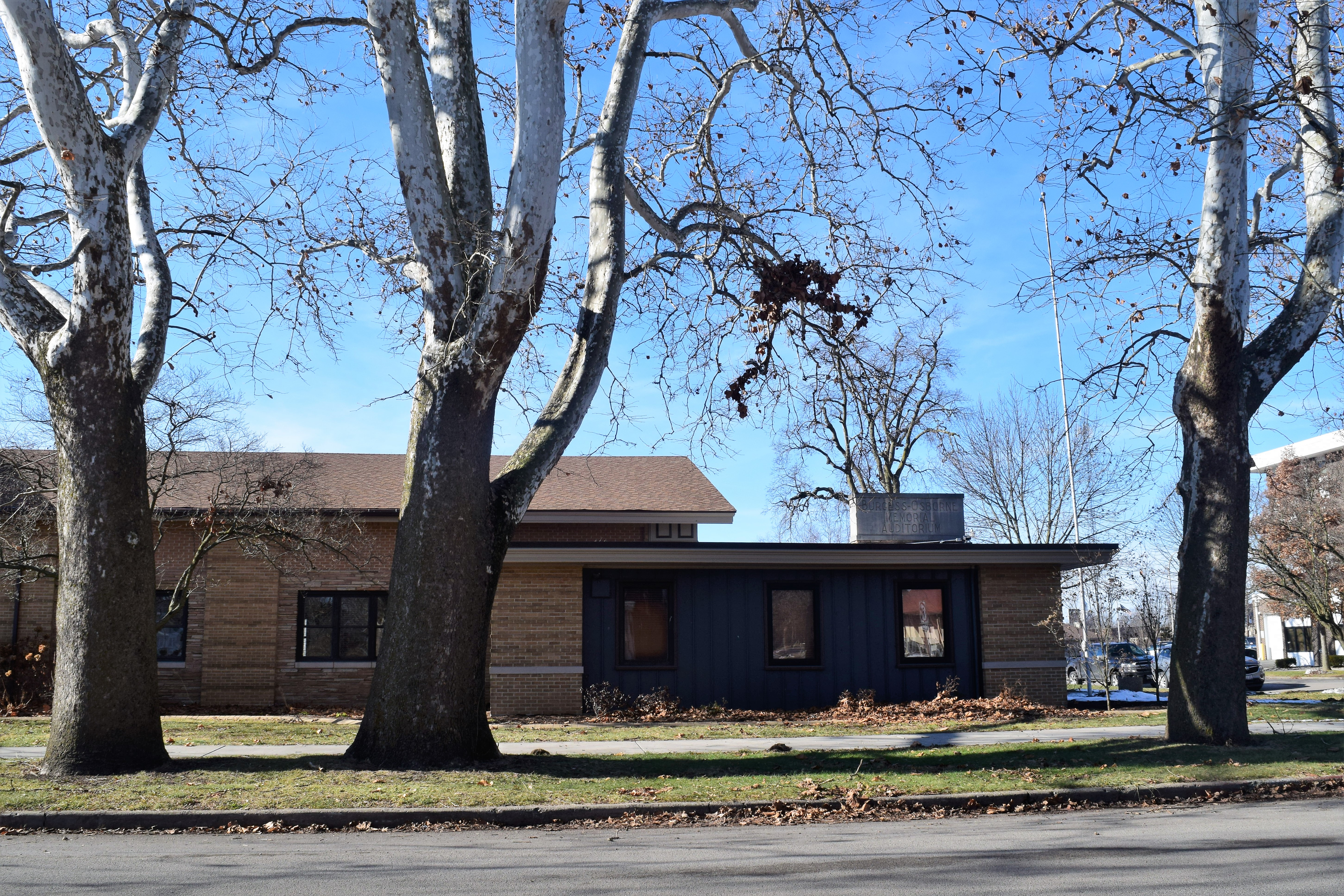

- Location within Illinois Location within the United States
- Location: 1701 Wabash Ave., Mattoon, Illinois
- Coordinates: 39°28′50″N 88°22′32″W
- Built: 1952-53
- Architect: Oliver W. Stiegemeyer
- Architectural style: Mid-century modern
- NRHP reference No.: 100002149
- Added to NRHP: March 5, 2018

The Burgess-Osborne Memorial Auditorium is a public auditorium at 1701 Wabash Avenue in Mattoon, Illinois. The building was constructed in 1952-53 using funds from the estate of Mattoon resident Emily Burgess-Osborne. Architect Oliver W. Stiegemeyer of St. Louis designed the auditorium in the mid-century modern style. His design includes a pylon above the entrance with the building's name, an asymmetrical shape, and brick and stone exterior sections, all characteristic elements of the style. The auditorium has hosted concerts, dances, political speeches, and public meetings; it was also the headquarters of the Mattoon Association of Commerce for several decades.

The building was added to the National Register of Historic Places on March 5, 2018.
