= Coles Together =

Development organization in Illinois, US

Coles Together is a non-profit economic development organization for Coles County, Illinois. It was founded in 1988 by a partnership between the public and private sectors to provide full-time economic development support for new and existing industry in Coles County.

Coles Together provides the industrial sector with resources and services needed to locate or expand a development within the community. This includes marketing, finance, and project packaging.

The organization actively pursued and was selected as the host site for FutureGen, a public-private partnership to build the world's first near-zero-emissions coal-based power plant in Mattoon, Illinois. The plant would have been the first near-zero-emissions coal-fired power plant built in the United States.

The president of Coles Together is Angela Griffin.

In 2009, the America's Power Factuality Tour interviewed Angela Griffin to report on FutureGen's potential impact on the local economy and its role in generating electricity in the United States.
