= Allegany County Transit =

Publicly funded, general-public bus system in Maryland, US

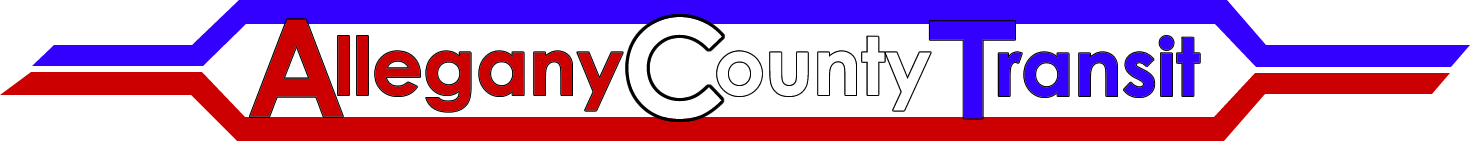
- Headquarters: 1000 Lafayette Avenue; Cumberland, Maryland
- Service area: Allegany County, Maryland
- Service type: Bus
- Routes: 7
- Fuel type: Diesel Gasoline
- Transit Division Superintendent: Elizabeth A. Robison-Harper
- Website: www.alleganygov.org/315/Transit

Allegany County Transit (ACT) is a publicly funded, general-public bus system serving Allegany County, Maryland, providing Public Transportation. Allegany County has two types of services, a Fixed Route and a Demand Response Service. Allegany County Transit is a division of Allegany County Government.

== Office and Garage ==
ACT operates out of a single facility located at 1000 Lafayette Avenue in Cumberland. This facility combines office space, maintenance bays, and parking for the system’s vehicles.

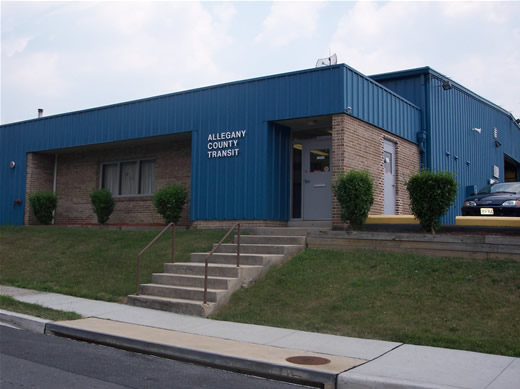

== Fixed Route Service ==
Allegany County Transit's Fixed Route service serves the areas of Cumberland, Frostburg and La Vale with route Monday through Friday (except holidays) during daytime hours. It also operates two additional fixed routes that operate, respectively, in the morning before the other routes begin service, and in the late afternoon/early evening after the other routes end service. Finally, it operates a route that connects Cumberland and La Vale with Lonaconing and Westernport; this route operates only on Tuesdays and Fridays. The present route structure took effect on September 4, 2012.

Fares for this service are $2.00, half fares are for senior citizens (65 years or older), Half fare card holders, or for those with Medicare, and children 5 or younger ride for free.

The Monday through Friday routes include Morning Service, Red Line, Green Line, Gold Line, Blue Line and Evening Service. The Purple Line to Seton Drive and the towns of Midland, Barton, Lonaconing, Westernport and Luke operates Tuesdays and Fridays only. All of the routes go to the transit's main hub at Queen City Shopping Centre in front of the Rose's in Downtown Cumberland.

The Morning Service provides early morning service to get people to work, using a combination of routes to travel to Cumberland, LaVale, Frostburg, Cresaptown to major employers such as: Western Maryland Regional Medical Center, Active Network, Frostburg State University, Walmart, and ACS.

The Red Line operates two different trips, all which begin at Rose's, in Downtown Cumberland. The first trip, Red Line Loop 1, services Johnson Heights, the Allegany County Health Department, the Western Maryland Regional Medical Center, and Allegany College of Maryland . Red Line Loop 2 services South Cumberland, which includes Maryland Avenue and Virginia Avenue.

The Blue Line also operates two different trips, Loop 1- Downtown to Martin's, Oldtown Rd, White Oaks, Industrial Boulevard, South Cumberland Marketplace (by request), Cascades Apartments, Mountain View Apartments, Jane Frazier Village, Archway Station, First St & South St, Oldtown Rd, Martin’s, and return to Downtown Rose’s and Loop 2 - Downtown to Decatur St, Baltimore Ave, Willowbrook Rd, Western Maryland Regional Medical Center, Allegany College of Maryland, Baltimore Ave, and return to Downtown Rose’s.

The Green Line operates two loops as well; Loop 1- - Downtown to Frederick St, Sheetz at Naves Cross Rd, Western Maryland Recovery, turn around at Bedford Rd & Acre Lane (Volunteer Fire Department), to return to Downtown Cumberland by Bedford Rd and Bedford St; and Loop 2- (Former Green Line) – Downtown to Centre St, National Hwy, Braddock Square, Country Club Mall and Walmart, Winchester Rd, McMullen Hwy, Dingle, Greene St to Queen City Towers, and return to Downtown Cumberland.

The Gold Line serves as a link from Cumberland, the Country Club Mall and Frostburg, beginning from Downtown Cumberland to West Side, Queen City Towers, Greene St, Dingle and I-68 to the Country Club Mall and Walmart, National Highway, LaVale Plaza, Frostburg Food Lion, Frostburg Plaza (ACS), Frostburg Main St, Bowery St, Braddock Rd to Active Network, College Ave & Maple St (FSU), Meshach Frost Village, Broadway, Frostburg Plaza, Food Lion, National Hwy, Country Club Mall and Walmart, and return to Downtown Cumberland, via I-68.

The Evening Service is also a combination of routes to provide service from 3:30 pm until 8:00 pm.

The Purple Line operates only on Tuesdays and Fridays, and offers 2 round-trips between Cumberland, Country Club Mall, and the communities of Lonaconing and Westernport.

Allegany County Transit provides service to Frostburg State University, when FSU is in Fall and Spring Semesters. The routes are open to the public. FSU students may ride free with a student ID. Other members of the general public may ride upon paying the standard ACT fare. FSU Day is the campus loop shuttle which operates every twenty minutes from 7:30 am – 3:30 pm. FSU Evening provides transportation from Frostburg State University campus to Main St, Frostburg and LaVale every hour from 2:30 am to 10:30 pm.

== Demand Response ==
Alltrans is Allegany County Transit's Demand responsive transport service for senior citizens and the ADA paratransit persons with disabilities who are unable to ride fixed route transit system. The fare for Alltrans is $3.00 flat rate, each way.

Senior Citizens: This is curb-to-curb demand response service for senior citizens (65 years and up). Medical trips are prioritized, and other trips are provided on a space-available basis. Passenger trips will be coordinated to serve as many people as possible and to use our vehicles in the most efficient manner.

Persons with Disabilities: ADA Paratransit service is provided only to persons with disabilities that prevent them from using accessible fixed-route transit system and is available only within ¾ of a mile from ACT fixed routes. ADA Paratransit service is provided during the same days and hours as our fixed-route bus services. Trip purposes are unrestricted.
