= WLBH (AM) =

Radio station in Mattoon, Illinois (1946–2018)

- Mattoon, Illinois; United States
- Broadcast area: Mattoon, Illinois; Charleston, Illinois; Effingham, Illinois
- Frequency: 1170 kHz

Programming
- Language: English
- Format: Defunct

Ownership
- Owner: James R. Livesay II; (Mattoon Broadcasting Company)
- Sister stations: WLBH-FM

History
- First air date: November 26, 1946

Technical information
- Facility ID: 40702
- Class: D
- Power: 5,000 watts day

WLBH (1170 AM) was a radio station licensed to Mattoon, Illinois, United States. The station began broadcasting on November 26, 1946, and originally ran 250 watts, during daytime hours only. In 1974, the station's power was increased to 5,000 watts. The station was originally owned by James Ray Livesay, and was later owned by his son James R. Livesay II.

The station had long aired a full service format, with farm/talk programming, and also airing country music throughout the 1980s and into the 1990s. On November 6, 1995, the station switched to a news-talk format, the station's first format change. Hosts included G. Gordon Liddy and Oliver North. Shortly thereafter, the station began airing adult standards music, branded "Unforgettable 1170". The station continued airing an adult standards format into the 2000s.

WLBH's license was cancelled on April 9, 2018, after having been off the air for an indeterminate amount of time, following a break-in at the station's transmitter site which occurred on December 14, 2017, in which the station's transmitter was destroyed and broadcasting equipment was stolen.
