= Gadabout Gaddis =

American fisherman, TV personality (1896–1986)

Roscoe Vernon Gaddis (January 28, 1896 – October 21, 1986), known professionally as Gadabout Gaddis, was an American fisherman and television presenter. Gaddis was born in Mattoon, Illinois, and was nicknamed Gadabout by a boss who said he could never find him.

Gaddis, an avid fisherman since his youth in Illinois, was also a pilot and adventurer. He began his career in the early days of television by showing his home movies of his fishing expeditions. In 1939, he briefly hosted a program about fishing on General Electric's experimental TV station W2XAD in Schenectady, New York. When W2XAD became WRGB in the mid-1940s, Gaddis returned to the station to host Outdoors with Liberty Mutual, which was only the second sponsored television show (Lowell Thomas's being the first). The show was eventually carried on 73 stations. Going Places with Gadabout Gaddis in the 1950s was less successful, but beginning in the early 1960s Gaddis starred in The Flying Fisherman, also sponsored by Liberty Mutual.

== The Flying Fisherman ==
The Flying Fisherman was a weekly program, usually broadcast on Saturday or Sunday afternoon, that showed Gaddis fishing in a different location each episode. The show's lone crew member was a cameraman who paddled alongside Gaddis in a nearby boat. The shows were filmed without sound, and Gaddis would add his low-key and folksy narration in the studio. The program had the look and feel of a home movie, which some analysts theorized was a major factor in its appeal to audiences.

Not all programs showed Gaddis making a catch, including an episode shot at Thomas Lake in Colorado, where Gaddis filmed for five days without catching a fish.

Gaddis was nominated for an Emmy Award in 1968. Gaddis earned his Army Air Corps pilot's wings during World War I and flew himself to each filming location in his Piper Cherokee 235. Each episode would open with a shot of Gadabout Gaddis landing his plane, but in reality it was his friend, Jack Phillipps, landing the plane in Gaddis's cowboy hat, as Gaddis could not "hit the mark"; i.e. he could not touch down on the spot required for the stationary camera to capture the landing.

Gaddis lived in Bingham, Maine, and Gadabout Gaddis Airport in that town was his base of operations. The airport was built about 1950 and later bought by Gaddis.

== Works ==
=== Publications ===
- The Flying Fisherman (R. V. 'Gadabout' Gaddis, as told to George Sullivan) 1967, Pocket Books

=== Filmography ===
- Fishing, USA, 1969
- Fly Fishing in America (co-host)

=== Television compilations ===
- The Flying Fisherman - Volume 1 (1986-1987, G.G. Communication GGV 2V)
  - Striper fishing around Big Bird Island, Buzzards Bay, Massachusetts
  - Virginia Beach Bluefish Tourney
  - Mazatlan Billfishing
- The Flying Fisherman - Volume 2 (1986-1987, G.G. Communication GGV 3V)
  - Bass fishing in Lake Powell
  - Bass fishing in Saline Lake, Louisiana
  - Crappie fishing in Grenada Lake, Mississippi
- The Flying Fisherman - Volume 3 (1986-1987, G.G. Communication GGV 4V)
  - Atlantic Salmon fishing in the Matane River
  - Fly fishing for blue gills in Cape Cod
  - Trout fishing at Flaming Gorge, Utah
- The Flying Fisherman - Volume 4 (1986-1987, G.G. Communication GGV 5V)
  - Striper fishing in Buzzards Bay, Massachusetts
  - Trout Fishing in Idaho's Bayhorse Lake
  - Trout Fishing in Oregon's Deschutes River
- The Flying Fisherman - Volume 5 (1986-1987, G.G. Communication)
  - Bass fishing in Arizona's Lake Mead
  - Atlantic Salmon fishing in the Miramichi River
  - Bluegill fishing in Kentucky's Barkley Lake
- The Flying Fisherman - Volume 6 (1986-1987, G.G. Communication)
  - Dolphin fishing off Panama City, Florida
  - Bass fishing in Wisconsin's Yellow River
  - Trout fishing in Colorado's Upper Rio Grande River
