= Richard Roytek House =

Historic house in Illinois, United States

- U.S. National Register of Historic Places
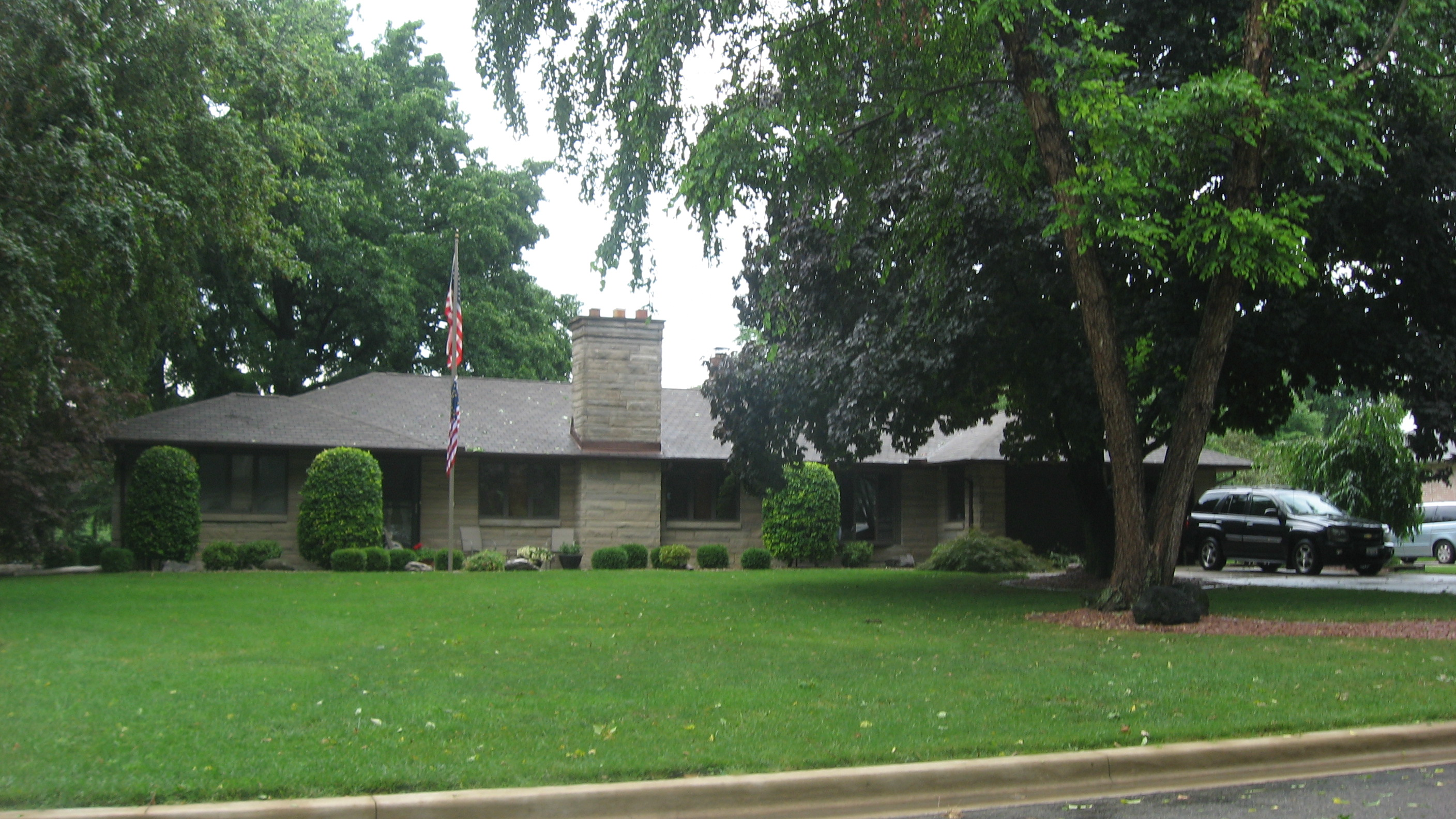

- Location within Illinois Location within the United States
- Location: 3420 Richmond Ave., Mattoon, Illinois
- Coordinates: 39°29′8″N 88°24′0″W
- Area: less than one acre
- Built: 1949-50
- Architectural style: Ranch style
- NRHP reference No.: 11000030
- Added to NRHP: February 22, 2011

The Richard Roytek House is a historic house located at 3420 Richmond Avenue in Mattoon, Illinois. Local businessman Richard Roytek built the house for his family in 1949–50. The house has a ranch style design with Prairie School details; Roytek chose this design after visiting Harlingen, Texas in 1948. The single-story house has the characteristic low profile and gently sloping roof of the ranch style. In addition, the house has large picture windows on its front facade and an attached garage, both common features of ranch-style houses. The house's Prairie School features include its use of wood and stone, its horizontal limestone exterior, its overhanging eaves, and its wide chimney. The house is one of roughly twelve ranch-style houses in Mattoon which predate the city's ranch-style subdivisions developed in the mid-1950s.

The house was added to the National Register of Historic Places on February 22, 2011.
