= Railway Express Agency Building =

- Formerly listed on the U.S. National Register of Historic Places
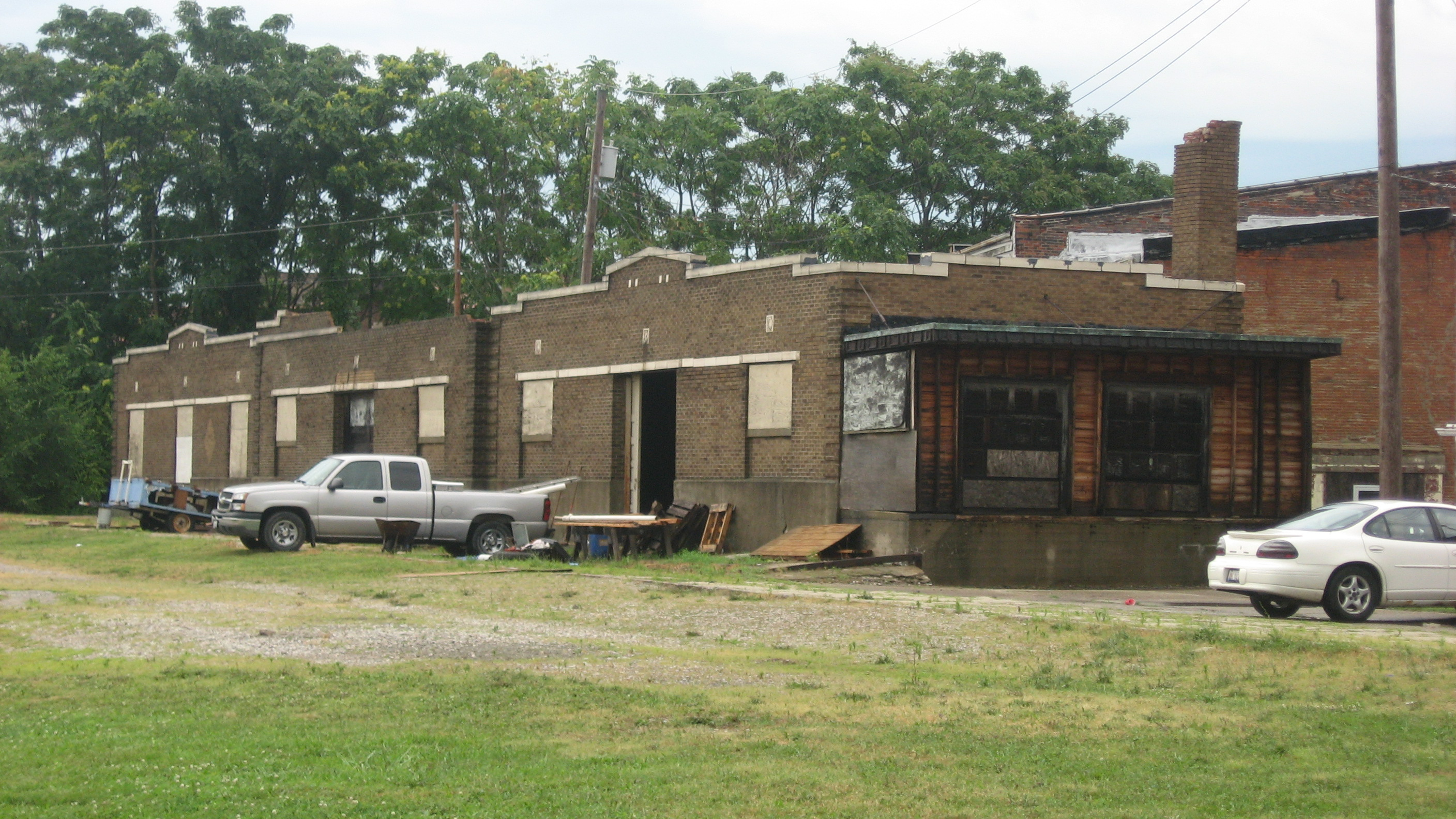
- The building in July 2013, shortly before its demolition

- Location within Illinois Location within the United States
- Location: 1804 Western Ave., Mattoon, Illinois
- Coordinates: 39°28′59″N 88°22′36″W
- Area: less than one acre
- Architectural style: Early Commercial
- NRHP reference No.: 94000974

Significant dates
- Added to NRHP: August 16, 1994
- Removed from NRHP: January 2, 2020

The Railway Express Agency Building was a historic building located at 1804 Western Avenue in Mattoon, Illinois. The building was constructed in 1918 to serve as the Mattoon office of the Railway Express Agency. The Railway Express Agency provided rail express shipping services to Mattoon's citizens, allowing them to ship money and packages along Mattoon's two major railways, the Illinois Central Railroad and Cleveland, Cincinnati, Chicago and St. Louis (Big Four). The agency formed in 1917, when the federal government ordered that all existing express services consolidate into a single service; this measure ensured consistent shipping of goods during World War I. The agency shipped goods to and from Mattoon until 1964, when the Big Four went bankrupt; the building served as a freight depot until 1971.

The building was added to the National Register of Historic Places on August 16, 1994. It fell into disrepair due to disuse, however, and was demolished in July 2013. It was delisted in 2020.
