= MacFarland House (Charleston, West Virginia) =

Historic house in West Virginia, United States

- U.S. National Register of Historic Places
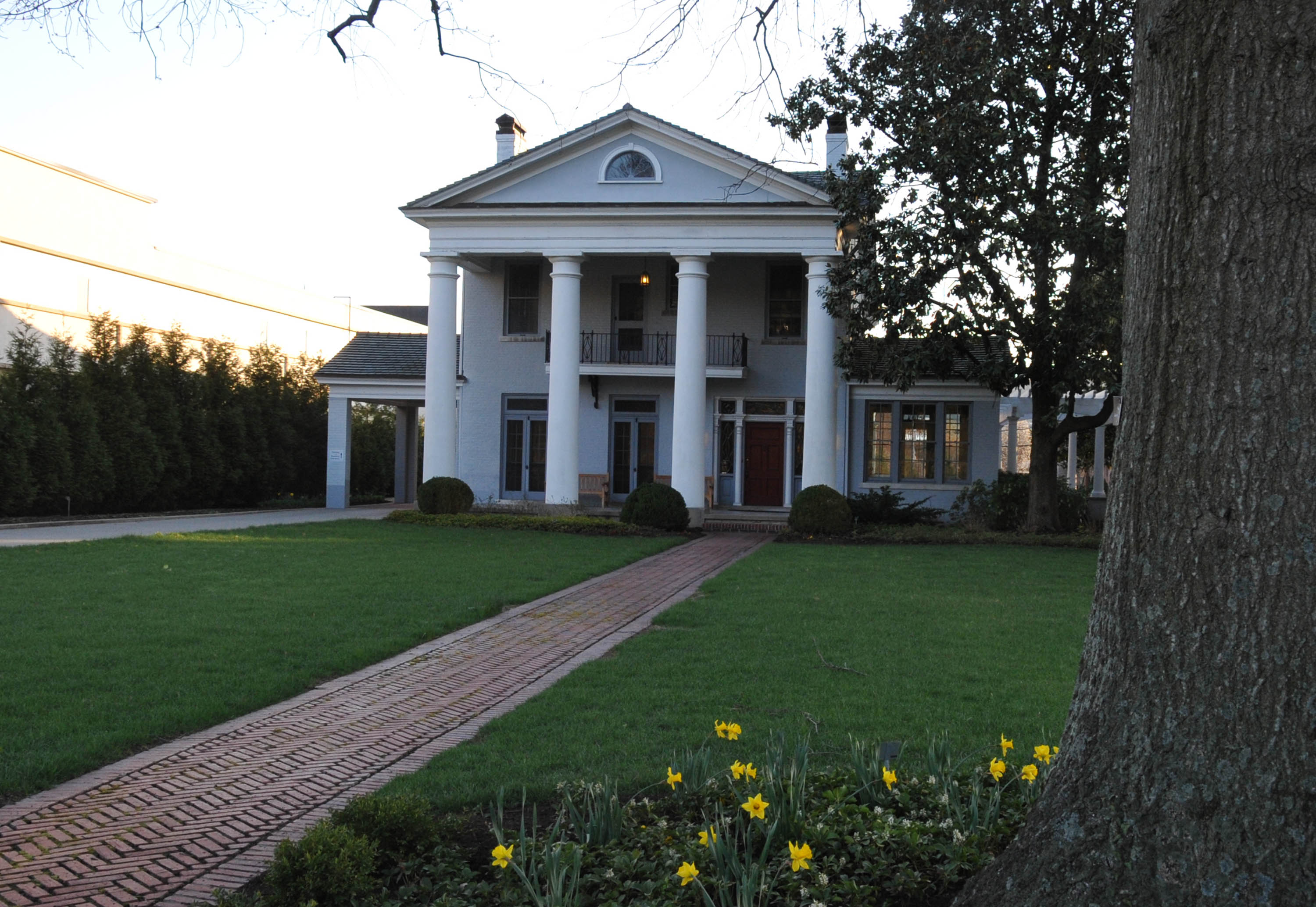

- Location within West Virginia Location within the United States
- Location: 1310 Kanawha Blvd., Charleston, West Virginia
- Coordinates: 38°20′35″N 81°37′49″W
- Built: 1836
- Architect: Whitteker, Norris
- Architectural style: Classical Revival
- NRHP reference No.: 79002585
- Added to NRHP: December 10, 1979

MacFarland House, also known as MacFarland-Ruby-Crowley-Hubbard House, is a historic home located at Charleston, West Virginia. It was built in 1836 and is one of only six pre-American Civil War houses still standing in the city. The house features a full two-story modified Roman Doric portico.

It was listed on the National Register of Historic Places in 1979.
