= McFarland House (McFarland, Wisconsin) =

Historic house in Wisconsin, United States

- U.S. National Register of Historic Places
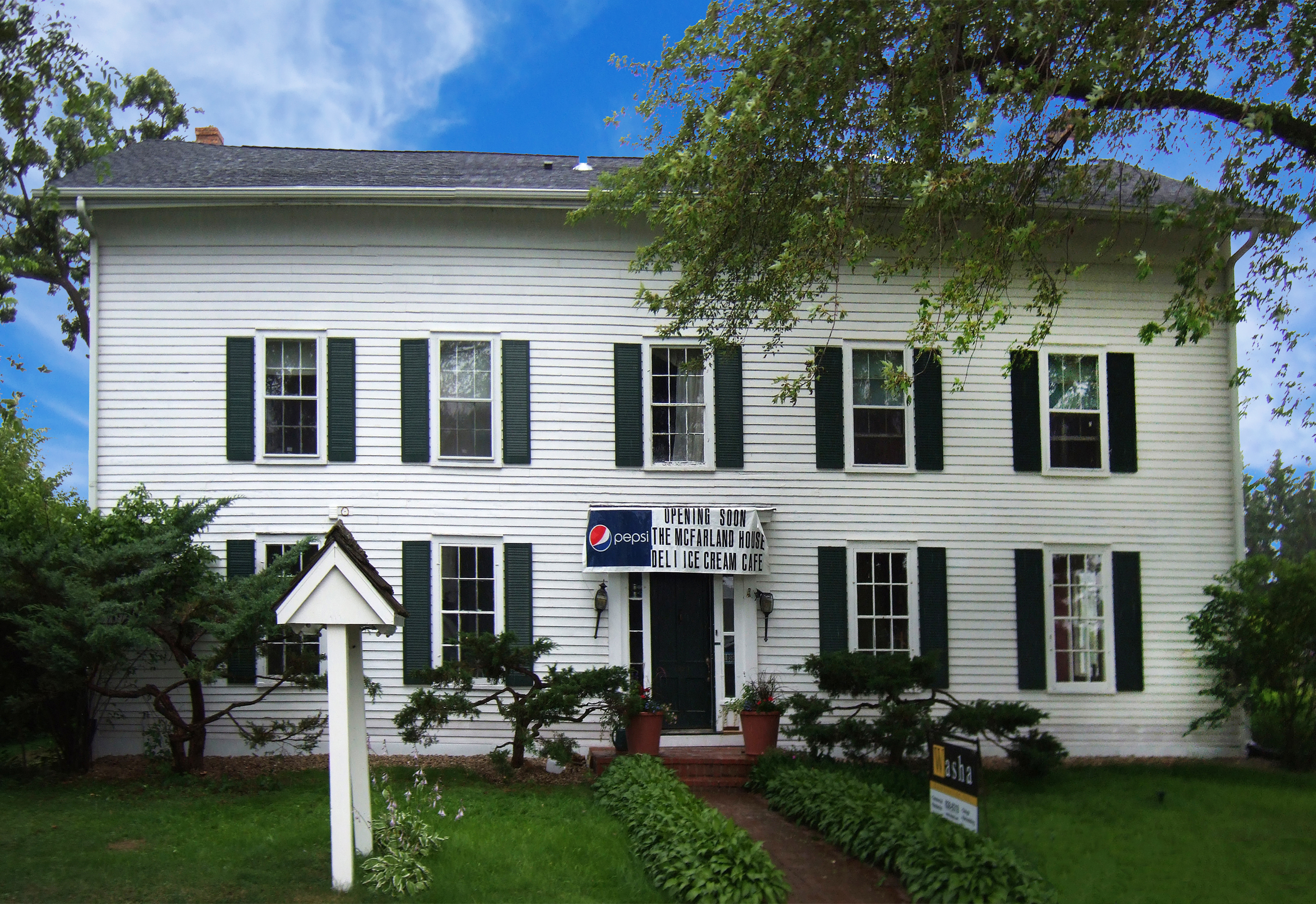
- McFarland House
- Location: 5923 Exchange St., McFarland, Wisconsin
- Coordinates: 43°00′48″N 89°17′19″W
- Area: less than one acre
- Built: 1857
- Architect: William McFarland
- Architectural style: Greek Revival, Vernacular
- NRHP reference No.: 88002228
- Added to NRHP: November 3, 1988

The McFarland House is a large Greek Revival-styled house built in 1857 in McFarland, Wisconsin by a founder and the namesake of the community. It was listed on the National Register of Historic Places in 1988 and on the State Register of Historic Places the following year.

== History ==
William Hugh McFarland was a British immigrant, as well as the founder and namesake of McFarland. He was a construction superintendent for the Milwaukee and Mississippi Railroad when it directed him in 1855 to build a depot on its line five miles south of Madison. McFarland agreed to build the depot if he could be made local agent for the railroad there. He built the depot in 1856.

The following year he built his house nearby. Prior houses in the settlement had been log cabins, but McFarland built a large 2.5-story frame house, clad in clapboard and wood shingles. The style is simple, but Greek Revival elements include the pitch of the roof, the frieze board under the eaves, the symmetric facade, and the sidelights on the front door. McFarland built several trapdoors from the attic to the roof, perhaps to give easy access to the roof if a spark from a running locomotive nearby set the roof shingles alight.

The house served as McFarland's private residence, but it was right near the depot and the downtown of McFarland. It was prominent home seen when entering the town by rail. McFarland was the station manager and postmaster, and his large attic hosted church services, weddings and town meetings. The large house also hosted newly arriving families, tourists and merchants. McFarlands lived in the house until 1969.
