= William and Margaret McFarland Core Farm =

- U.S. National Register of Historic Places
- U.S. Historic district
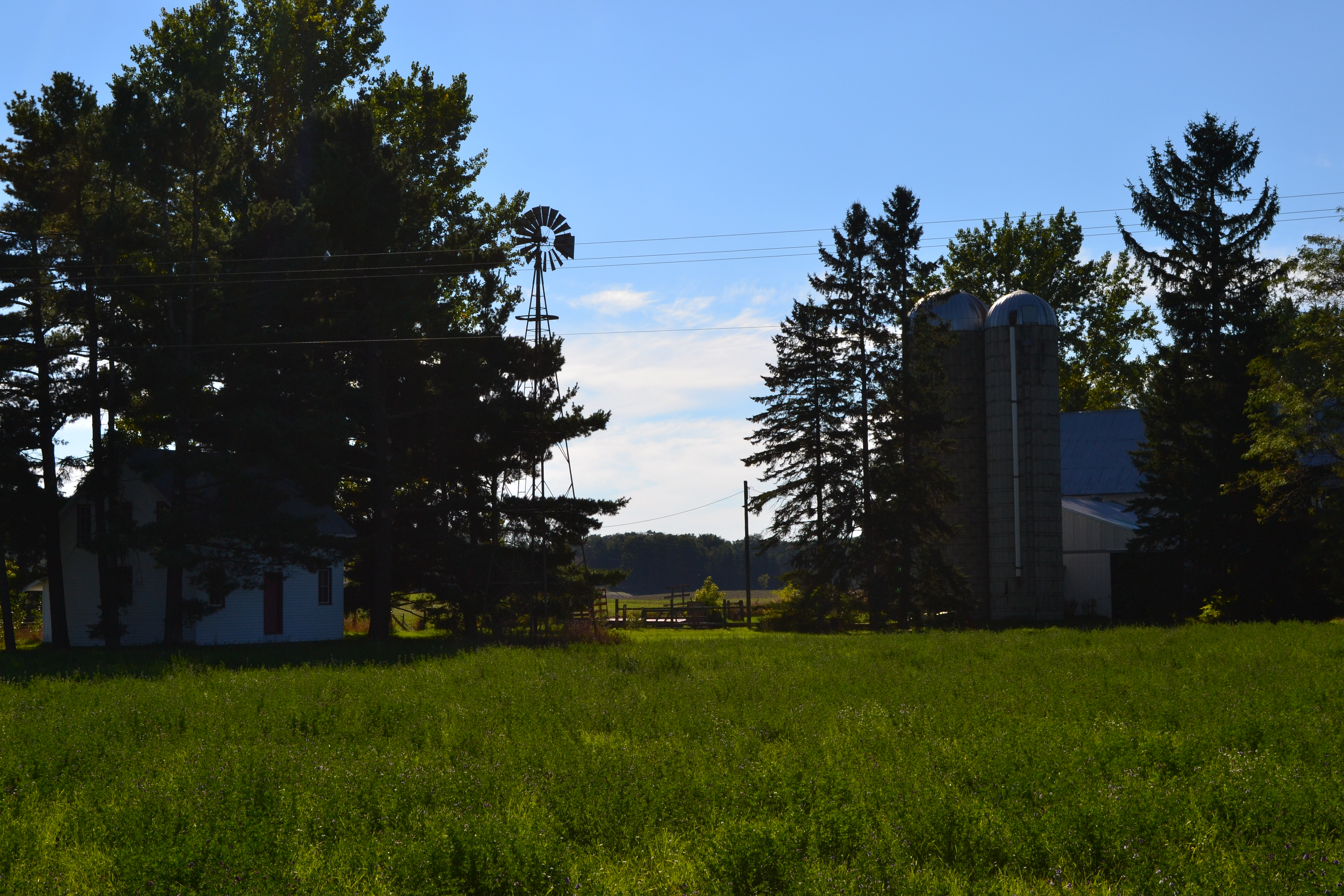

- Location within Michigan Location within the United States
- Interactive map
- Location: 5946 S. Center Hwy & 5856 S. Lake Leelanau Dr. Bingham Township, Leelanau County, Michigan
- Coordinates: 44°53′40″N 85°41′2″W
- Area: 148.6 acres (60.1 ha)
- Built: 1865
- Architectural style: Greek Revival, Gabled-Ell House
- NRHP reference No.: 04001579
- Added to NRHP: February 2, 2005

The William and Margaret McFarland Core Farm, now operated as the Ruby Ellen Farm, is a farmstead located at 5946 South Center Highway and 5856 South Lake Leelanau Drive in Bingham Township, Leelanau County, Michigan. The farm was operated by William Core and his descendants for nearly 150 years, from 1865 until 2011. It was listed on the National Register of Historic Places in 2005.

== History ==
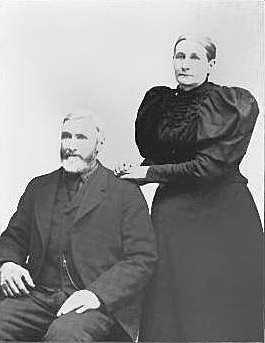
William and Margaret Core, c.1903

William Core was born in Lincolnshire, England in 1842, the son of Thomas and Annie Core. His family emigrated to Canada in 1846, settling first near Hamilton, Ontario, and later in Lambton, Ontario. William Core left home when he was eighteen to work as a farmhand. He spent a year working on a farm near Detroit, then in 1861 moved to Leelanau County. In 1863, he enlisted in the First Michigan Light Artillery, and spent about a year and a half fighting in the Civil War.

In 1865, after his discharge from the army, William Core returned to Leelanau County and purchased 160 acres to homestead at this site. He immediately began farming the land and constructing buildings. In 1867, William Core married Margaret McFarland, the daughter of Daniel and Elizabeth McFarland. The couple had ten children, eight of whom lived to adulthood: Perry, Arzina, Annie, Lucy, Julius, George, David, and Oscar.

The ownership of the farm passed from William Core to his descendants. In 1927 the farm was purchased by William Core's granddaughter Ruby Ellen Core Dobson and her husband Harvey. They continued to own and operate the farm, save for a brief hiatus during the Great Depression when it was repossessed. However, the Dobsons struck a deal to repurchase the farm from the bank. In 1969, on Harvey's death, ownership later passed to Ruby and Harvey's son Rex Dobson.

However, Rex never married and was the last of his family line. By 1999, he was concerned about protecting the farmstead from the encroachment of nearby Traverse City suburbs, and sold the development rights on 90 acres of farmland to Michigan's Farmland Preservation Program to prevent development. In 2002, he created The Rex Dobson Ruby Ellen Farm Foundation to preserve buildings, and in 2005 placed the farmstead on the National Register of Historic Places. The farmstead was also the location used to film the 2004 movie "Red Barn," starring Ernest Borgnine. Rex Dobson died in 2011, ending 146 years of continuous family operation of the William and Margaret McFarland Core Farm. The farmstead is currently operated as a working farm, open to the public with prior arrangements.

== Description ==
The William and Margaret McFarland Core Farm is sited among rolling hills, containing fields, woodlands, and orchards. The farm itself consists of 14 buildings on about 150 acres.
