= Scotty's Brewhouse =

Defunct restaurant chain based in Indiana, U.S.

Restaurant information
- Established: 1996
- Closed: December 12, 2018
- Owner: Due North Management
- Food type: American cuisine
- Dress code: Casual
- Location: United States
- Reservations: Yes
- Other locations: Bloomington, Indiana; Mishawaka, Indiana; Brownsburg, Indiana; Fort Wayne, Indiana; Noblesville, Indiana; West Lafayette, Indiana; Indianapolis, Indiana

Scotty's Brewhouse was a chain of restaurants and breweries in Indiana. There were 7 Scotty's Brewhouse's locations in Indiana. Locations outside of Indiana include Oxford Ohio, Poplar Bluff Missouri, Champaign Illinois and Mattoon Illinois.

On December 12, 2018, it was announced that Scotty's Holdings LLC, the parent company of Scotty's Brewhouse, had filed for bankruptcy.

== History ==
Scotty's Brewhouse was founded by Scott Wise in 1996. He opened the first Scotty's in Muncie, Indiana. The original location started serving hard alcohol, for the first time ever, in October 2015. The restaurant also underwent a $300,000 renovation.

The Second Scotty's location opened in Bloomington, Indiana, in 2001.

In 2006, Scotty's opened in Indianapolis. The first restaurant was on the north side of town. In spring 2015, the restaurant underwent $500,000 in renovations. The menu was also updated. They installed a pizza oven, allowing the restaurant to expand its pizza menu.

In November 2015, the first Scotty's was announced to open outside of Indiana, in Punta Gorda, Florida.

In 2016, Scotty's Dawghouse opened at Butler University as part of a new campus parking expansion. The name change was made to reflect the mascot of the college.

In December 2016, the parent company of Scotty's Brewhouse, Scotty's Dawghouse and Thr3e Wise Men Brewing Co. was purchased by Due North Management based in Scottsdale, Arizona. With its purchase, Due North planned to rapidly expand the concepts both domestically and internationally.

In 2018, Scotty's Brewhouse opened its first Texas location in Waco, Texas in a former Twin Peaks restaurant, which was the location of the 2015 Waco shootout.

On December 20, 2018, Scotty's Brewhouse announced the closure of four locations which included the Muncie, Carmel, downtown Indianapolis, and Waco, Texas restaurants.

== Cuisine ==
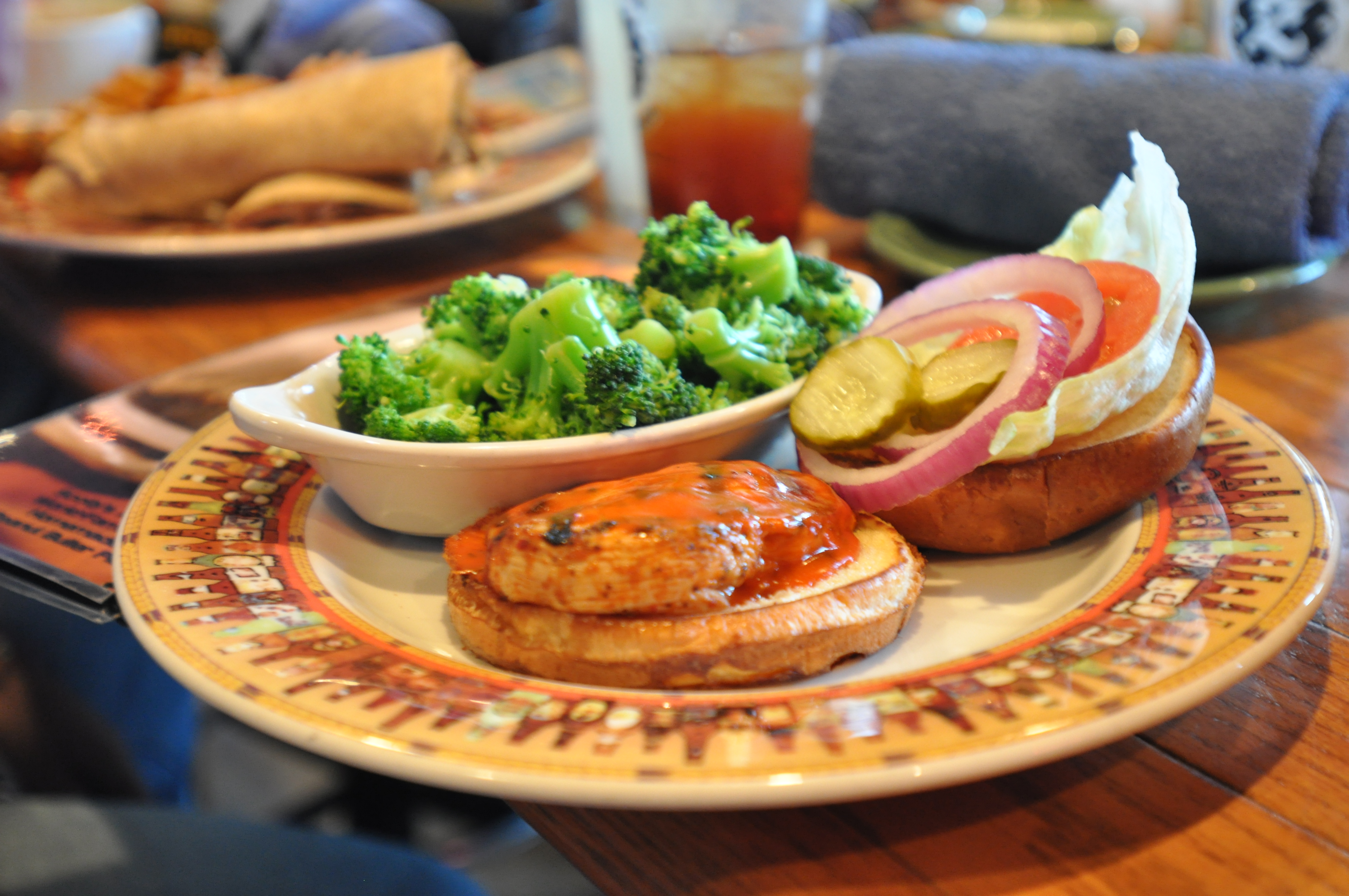
Chicken sandwich at Scotty's Brewhouse

The restaurants served American cuisine with a focus towards hamburgers and pizza. Scotty's Brewhouse had a monthly hamburger. In August 2015, the hamburger of the month was a burger topped with deep fried Oreos, crushed Oreos, and cream cheese frosting. Scotty's Brew Club had a Bloody Mary bar and brunch. They also served a hamburger with peanut butter on it, called a Shewman Burger. Additional menu items included steak, mussels, fried pickles and nachos and trendier food such as tater tot nachos and macaroni and cheese.

== Alcoholic beverages ==
The breweries produced Three Wise Men beer. Most of the restaurants also served wine and liquor.
