= Starr Hotel =

- U.S. National Register of Historic Places
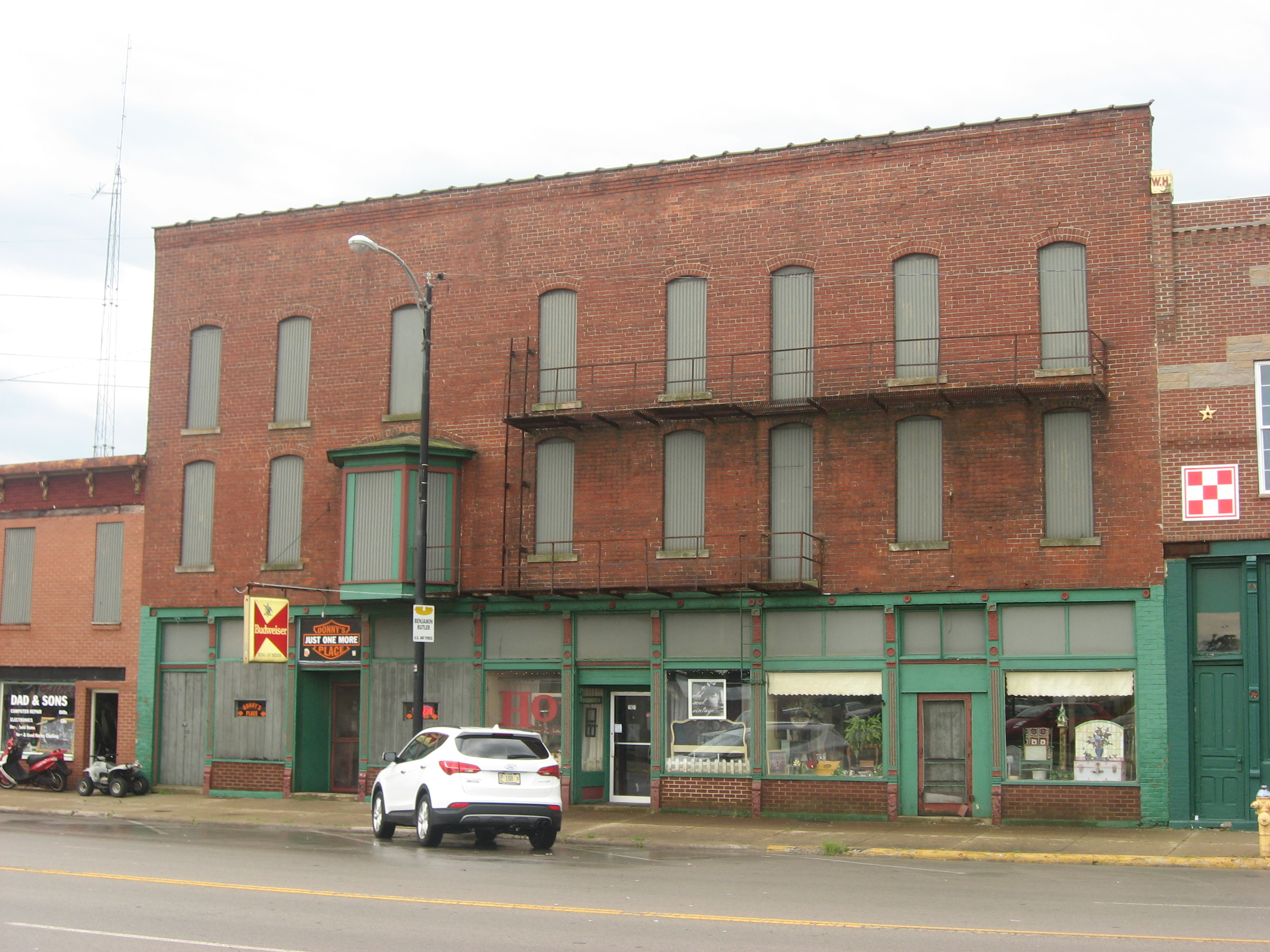

- Location within Illinois Location within the United States
- Location: 1913--1923 Western Ave., Mattoon, Illinois
- Coordinates: 39°28′59″N 88°22′44″W
- Area: less than one acre
- Built: 1888
- Architectural style: Late Victorian
- NRHP reference No.: 94000975
- Added to NRHP: August 16, 1994

The Starr Hotel is a historic hotel building located at 1913-1923 Western Avenue in Mattoon, Illinois. Businessman George M. Custer built the hotel in 1888. The hotel primarily housed workers on Mattoon's three railroads: the Illinois Central, the Cleveland, Cincinnati, Chicago and St. Louis (Big Four), and the Peoria, Decatur and Evansville. Mattoon's economy was primarily based on railroad traffic; the city expanded greatly after the Illinois Central and Big Four opened in the 1850s, its railroad yards employed hundreds of workers, and multiple industries grew in Mattoon due to its railroad access. While the hotel mainly housed railroad workers, it also catered to other working-class groups, such as seasonal broom corn workers and hobos. The hotel became a boarding house in the 1920s, and its upper floors closed entirely in the 1960s; its first floor is still a commercial property. The building is one of two surviving working-class hotels in Mattoon.

The hotel was added to the National Register of Historic Places on August 16, 1994.
