= McFarland House (Charleston, Illinois) =

Historic house in Illinois, United States

- U.S. National Register of Historic Places
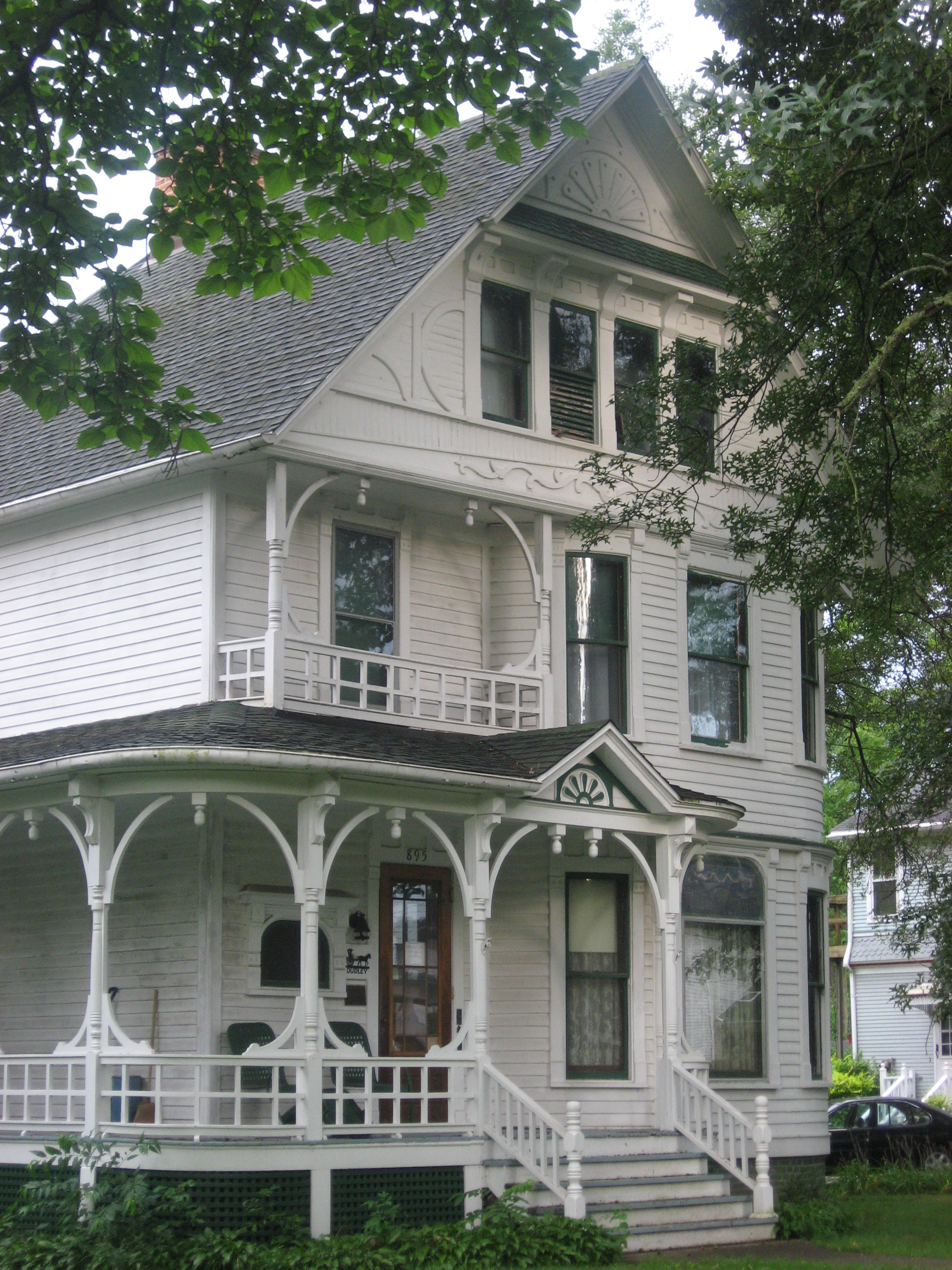

- Location within Illinois Location within the United States
- Location: 895 Seventh St., Charleston, Illinois
- Coordinates: 39°29′25″N 88°10′25″W
- Area: 1.5 acres (0.61 ha)
- Built: 1890
- Architect: Mitchell, Charles D.
- Architectural style: Queen Anne
- NRHP reference No.: 91001690
- Added to NRHP: November 14, 1991

The McFarland House is a historic house located at 895 7th St. in Charleston, Illinois. Architect Charles D. Mitchell designed the Queen Anne house, which was built from 1890 to 1892. The front of the house features a wraparound porch decorated with elliptical bracketing, pendants along the roof line, and partially turned columns. A small second-story porch above the entrance has the same design. A gable at the entrance has a sunburst design; the large gable at the top of the house has a matching sunburst. The attic windows, which are located in the large gable, have a pent roof and are surrounded by decorative woodwork. Queen Anne features inside the house include a stained glass bay window in the parlor, a fireplace decorated with ceramic tiles, decorative spindlework, and wooden door and window surrounds.

The house was added to the National Register of Historic Places on November 14, 1991.
