= Mattoon, Illinois =

- City
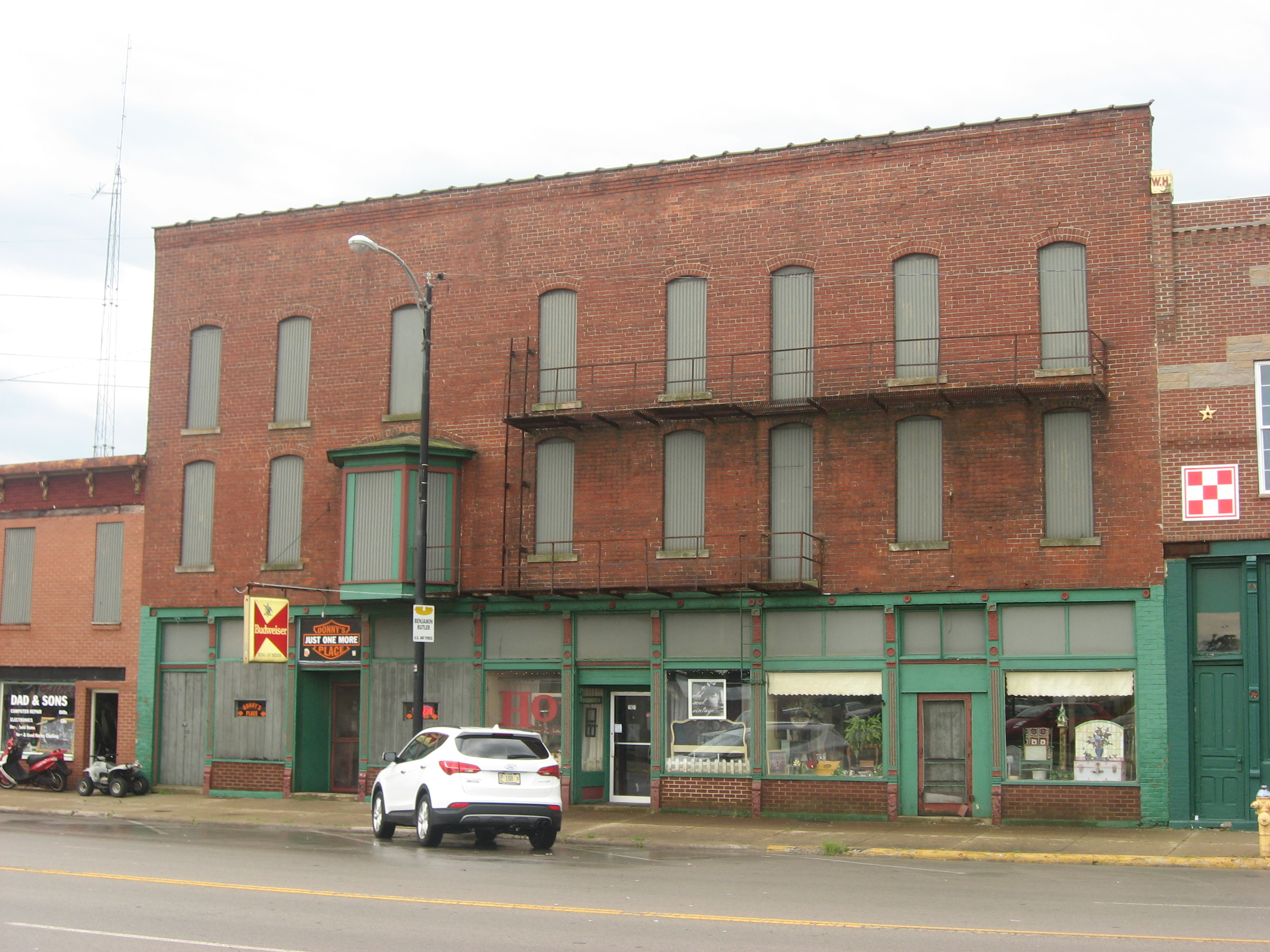
- Starr Hotel, built in 1888 and listed on the National Register of Historic Places
- Motto: Working together to build the future
- Location of Mattoon in Coles County, Illinois
- Coordinates: 39°28′39″N 88°21′44″W
- Country: United States
- State: Illinois
- County: Coles
- Townships: Mattoon, Lafayette, Paradise
- Named for: William Mattoon

Area
  - Total: 10.32 sq mi (26.72 km^{2})
  - Land: 10.31 sq mi (26.71 km^{2})
  - Water: 0.0039 sq mi (0.01 km^{2})
- Elevation: 719 ft (219 m)

Population (2020)
  - Total: 16,870
  - Density: 1,635.7/sq mi (631.55/km^{2})
- Time zone: UTC−6 (CST)
  - Summer (DST): UTC−5 (CDT)
- ZIP Code: 61938
- Area code(s): 217 and 447
- FIPS code: 17-47553
- GNIS ID: 2395046
- Website: mattoon.illinois.gov

Mattoon (/ˈmæt.tun/ MAT-toon) is a city in Coles County, Illinois, United States. The population was 16,870 as of the 2020 census. The city is home to Lake Land College and has close ties with its neighbor, Charleston. Both are principal cities of the Charleston–Mattoon Micropolitan Statistical Area.

A restaurant named "Burger King" was founded here prior to the Burger King restaurant chain.

== History ==
=== Early history ===
One of the main factors determining the settlement of Mattoon and Coles County in general was the topography. Coles County straddled a timberline in the southern half and prairie in the north. The forested areas were primarily fed by two major rivers: the Embarras River in the east and the Kaskaskia in the west. The prairie, known as the "Grand Prairie", was generally wet and swampy. An early historian described the geography:

"Away from the timber to the north, the face of the country is generally quite level, broken only by long undulations. It is almost entirely prairie land in this part, and was allowed to remain uncultivated until after the opening of the railroads. It was largely used for pasturage during this period, and often presented signs of great animation as the herds of cattle, under the care of their drovers, moved about over its grassy, slightly undulating surface."

Groves could be found scattered throughout the area. Early settlers to the area started homesteads in the timberline, which provided building materials and fuel. Since the vast majority of early settlers came from wooded areas of Indiana, Kentucky, and Tennessee (by way of the Ohio and Wabash River valleys), the forests also provided a sense of familiarity.

In 1826, Kentucky émigré Charles Sawyer became the first white man known to settle in the Mattoon area, just north of the timberline (known as the Wabash Point Timber) along the Little Wabash River. Levi Doty built Sawyer's cabin while the latter returned to Kentucky to retrieve the rest of his family. Within a year, a few families very quickly settled around Sawyer in the area of Paradise Township, including Dr. John Epperson, the county's first physician. Settlers built log cabins using pegs (no iron or nails). "The luxuries of life were generally not seen the first years of the settlement, but appeared as the residents could obtain them."

Corn was planted and remained a staple crop. Gardens of potatoes and other vegetables were maintained. Hogs, which ran wild in the woods, provided pork, while "deer, bears, wild turkeys, and prairie chickens provided an abundant supply of wild meat." Wolves proved troublesome to domesticated animals.

The first school was established in 1827–28 in the Paradise Township, taking place in a makeshift cabin and taught by James Waddill. The costs were $2.50-3.00 per student. School was maintained in this location until 1844–45, when the first real schoolhouse was built in what would become Mattoon. That year, the Illinois State Legislature passed its first school laws, making Mattoon a forerunner for early education in the state.

As the population grew, demand for a local government increased. On Christmas Day, 1830, Coles County was established. The county was named after Edward Coles, the second governor in Illinois who served from 1822 to 1826. Settlers in the Mattoon area remained poor and humble, but their community remained close knit.

In 1836, "Old State Road", which runs along the southern end of town, became one of the first trails to be established in the Mattoon area. Another trail, the Kaskaskia Pass, traveled past what was known as "The Lone Elm Tree", a natural landmark that helped guide visitors and newcomers. The tree was cut down on August 1, 1950, due to disease. A plaque at the corner of 32nd Street and Western Avenue marks the location of this important landmark.

=== 1850–1900 ===
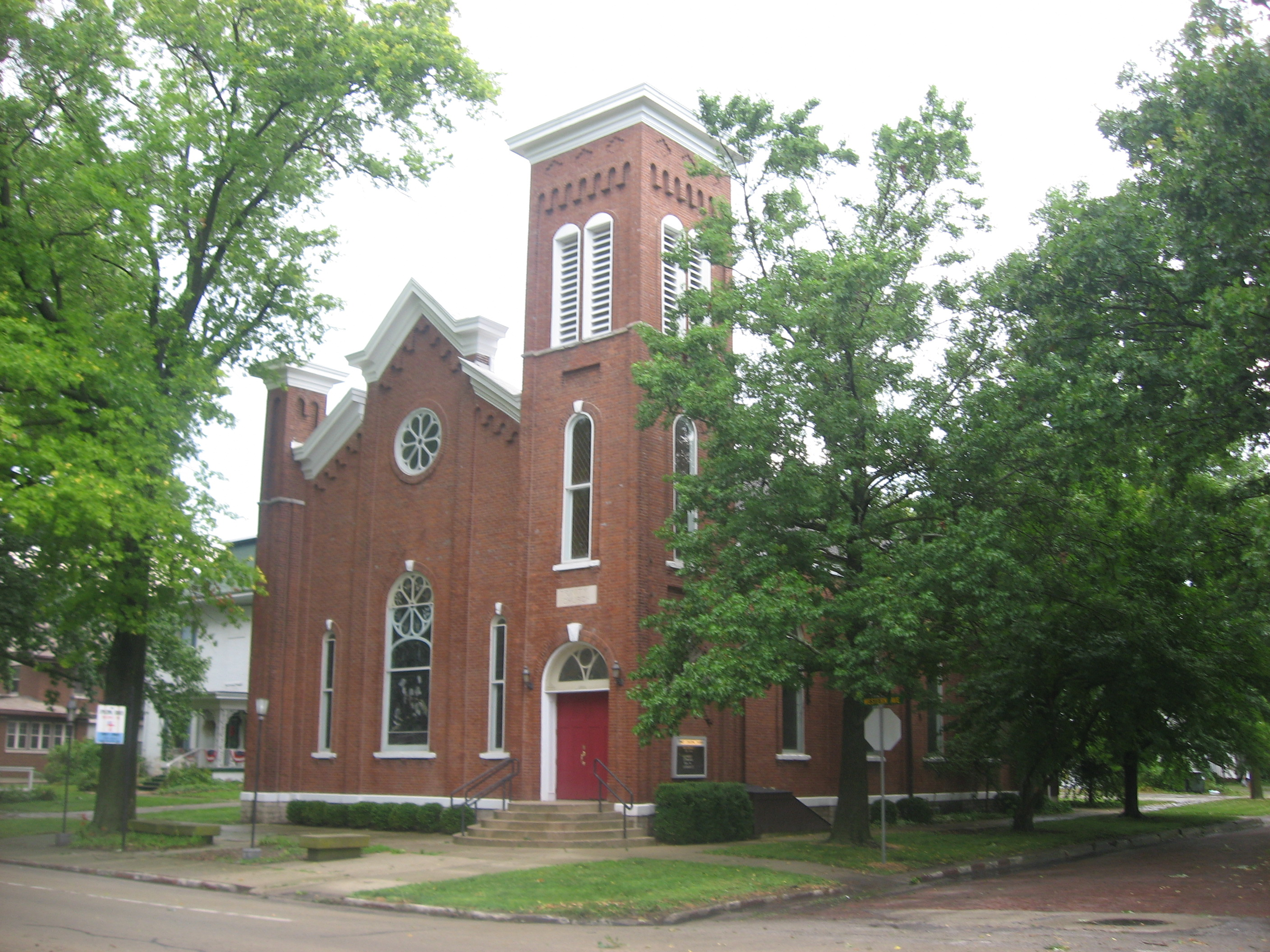
Unity Church, erected in 1872 and listed on the National Register of Historic Places

The growth and subsequent history of Mattoon is tied to that of local railroads. In 1854, railroad surveyors from the Illinois Central Railroad and Terre Haute and Alton Railroad found their railroads would cross in the Mattoon area, and a burst of investment and land speculation began. The two railroads raced to the meeting point, on the understanding that the first to arrive would not have to pay to maintain the crossing. The community that had grown in the area of swamp grass and prairie came to be known as "Pegtown", which referred to the pegs (stakes) used to demarcate lots to be sold at public auction. Among the speculators were Elisha Linder, Ebenezer Noyes, James T. Cunningham, Stephen D. Dole, John L. Allison, and John Cunningham. Land was purchased for $2.50 per acre. On December 12, 1854, County Surveyor John Meadows laid out the town.

The 1850s saw a flurry of activity for the emerging town. In 1855, the first houses were built. Benjamin Turney used 16 yoke of oxen to drag his home from a farm three miles away, while R. H. McFadden built his home near the area of present-day First Street and Prairie Avenue. In May that year, "Pegtown" lots were auctioned. On June 9, 1855, the first train arrived on the Terre Haute Alton Railroad. In July, the Pennsylvania House became the first hotel in town, operating at the present-day 1600 block of Broadway Avenue. That month the first post office was established, with James M. True serving as postmaster. In September, Rev. Isaac Hart performed the town's first wedding, marrying Sarah Norvell and R. H. McFadden.

The next year, 1856, saw the creation of the first newspaper. The weekly "Independent Gazette" published four page, seven-column editions. In that same year, the first public school was established (at 1307 Champaign Ave.). In 1856, the first two babies were born in Mattoon, Charles Cartmell in July and Mollie Puff in September. By now, the rapidly growing town had more than 100 buildings. Between 1856 and 1857, the first Baptist, Catholic, Methodist, Christian, and Presbyterian churches were formed.

In May 1857, residents voted to incorporate the town, with 65 votes for and 25 votes against. Also in 1857, ordinances passed forbidding drunkenness, working on Sunday, disturbing public or religious meetings, gaming, leaving carcasses on the streets, littering, obstructing sidewalks, and driving fast horses. In 1858, the first public park was created with a land deed from John Allison and James and John Cunningham. The park remains and is today called Allison–Cunningham Park.

On the night before the fourth Lincoln-Douglas debate of September 18, 1858, at the Coles County Fairgrounds, both Abraham Lincoln and Stephen A. Douglas slept in nearby Mattoon. Lincoln slept in the Essex House hotel, a popular hotel in those times. He addressed a small crowd from his hotel room. The Essex House, the third brick building in town, opened on the southwest corner of the railroad intersection with Union Station located on the lower story. The Essex House served as hotel, restaurant, and ticket office for both railroads. Later, Ulysses S. Grant would also use the hotel. Today, the mural "Civility" (2009), located in Progress Square, commemorates the arrival of the railroad and depicts the Essex House and both Lincoln and Douglas. "The Lone Elm Tree" occupies the center of the mural.

In 1861, the town was officially named after William B. Mattoon, the chief construction engineer working for the Terre Haute and Alton Railroad and partner of the Massachusetts firm "Phelps, Mattoon, and Barnes." The reason for the honor is unclear; some say he won the naming rights because his rail crew arrived first. Others say he beat other claimants in a card game, or that Pegtown residents hoped the wealthy Mattoon would invest in the town if they named it after him. With its combination of excellent transportation and remarkably fertile prairie soils, Mattoon expanded rapidly. By the dawn of the 20th century, Mattoon's growing population and rail access brought manufacturing and industry.

On June 17, 1861, General Ulysses S. Grant took his first post of the American Civil War when he assumed command of the 21st Illinois Infantry in Mattoon. The flagpole from General Grant's camp was preserved and is on display at the Mattoon Public Library.

In 1865, Amish settlers began a community to the north near Arthur. Amish farm stands and horse-drawn buggies are not uncommon sights in the northern part of Mattoon today.

In the 1890s, Mattoon led the successful campaign to have a proposed college in eastern Illinois located in Coles County. The citizens were chagrined when neighboring Charleston was chosen as the home of the future Eastern Illinois University instead.

=== 20th century ===
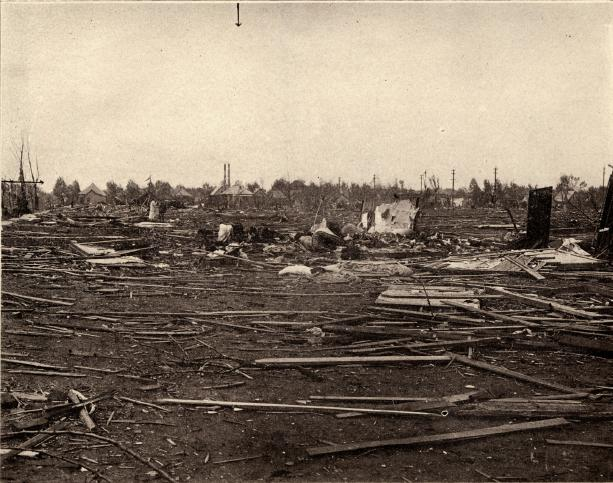
1917 tornado damage in Mattoon

On May 26, 1917, the town was devastated by an F4 tornado which killed 101 people and injured approximately 638 people. The tornado was Illinois's third-deadliest tornado disaster.

In 1932, the Kuehne Manufacturing Co. began producing dinette sets at their new plant on the south side of Mattoon. Its early sets were wooden, but by the 1950s Kuehne was making the chromed metal breakfast-room sets so popular during that decade. The company closed in 1965. Today, Kuehne dinette sets are prized by collectors of mid-century modern furniture.

The 1940 discovery of petroleum reserves near Mattoon led to a small "oil boom" over the next two decades, bringing with it economic benefits and increased civic pride. Oil extraction continues to be an important economic activity.

Mattoon was the site of the "Mad Gasser" attacks of the 1940s.

In 1966, Lake Land College was built just south of the city. The community college offers degrees for immediate employment and pre-university education.

The Burger King — unrelated to the Florida-based fast food chain Burger King — is a Mattoon restaurant whose owners claim it is the "original" Burger King. In 1968, they sued the national chain Burger King, producing a well-known case in United States trademark law. The federal 7th Circuit Court of Appeals ruled that federal trademark registration has priority over state law, giving the national Burger King chain rights to the name beyond a 20-mile radius around the original Burger King. Today, the closest Burger King franchise location is 25 miles away in Tuscola, Illinois.

Mattoon was home to several minor-league baseball teams in the late 19th and early 20th centuries. The last stadium, with about 2,000 seats, was torn down in the late 1950s. Today, the city has a thriving junior league and has hosted many junior league regionals and World Series.

=== 21st century ===
Traditionally a bastion of manufacturing, Mattoon has lost several major plants in the last two decades. On December 18, 2007, the U.S. Department of Energy chose the city as the site of its FutureGen project, a zero-emissions coal-fueled power plant that was to make hydrogen and electricity while using carbon capture and storage. Three years later, the city rejected the proposal after DoE announced its intention to retrofit an existing power plant in Meredosia instead of building a new one in Mattoon.

In 2000, Mattoon native Clyde D. Hood was indicted for the Omega Trust scam, a 1994–95 scam that brought in around $10 million and was one of the largest in U.S. history. Hood and accomplices bought businesses in the Mattoon area, including the Blue Bird Diner, a longtime family favorite in the small town.

The 1986 arrival of the Lender's Bagels factory led Mattoon to dub itself the "Bagel Capital of the World." Home to the world's largest bagel, the town holds a weeklong family festival, "Lenders Bagelfest", at the end of July. The main event is a three-day weekend festival held in Peterson Park near downtown, featuring food and craft vendors, local organizations, rides such as the Ferris wheel and the Tilt-A-Whirl, and morning community events such as The Big Bagel Breakfast and Bagel Bingo. A beauty pageant crowns winners in various age groups, who ride in the parade held on the Saturday morning of the event. The festival features concerts by local and national musicians. In 2009, Zac Brown Band headlined the festival; others have included Night Ranger, 38 Special, Jason Aldean, The Marshall Tucker Band, Travis Tritt, and Ronnie Milsap. There is also a Christian night featuring contemporary Christian musicians such as Building 429 and Remedy Drive.

General Electric closed since the need for traditional lighting has decreased. The plant opened in the 1940s and has remained a staple ever since. On January 15, 2020, LSC Communications announced they would be closing their Mattoon facility. LSC Communications was Mattoon's largest employer. Affiliates of Phoenix Investors purchased LSC.

== Geography ==
According to the 2021 census gazetteer files, Mattoon has a total area of 10.32 square miles (26.73 km^{2}), of which 10.31 square miles (26.70 km^{2}) (or 99.96%) is land and 0.00 square miles (0.00 km^{2}) (or 0.04%) is water. Nearby rivers have been dammed to form Lake Paradise and Lake Mattoon south of the city.

The terminal moraine of the Wisconsin Glacier is located just to the south of Mattoon. Heading south on I-57 there is an impressive vista from the top of the moraine at the south Mattoon exit. While the moraine is of Wisconsinan age (about 10,000 years before present), the land to the south is of Illinoian age (about 100,000 years before present). The small oil field to the south of the moraine is also attributed to glacial activity: The weight of the glacier to the north created cracks in the underlying bedrock. Oil collected adjacent to these cracks.

=== Climate ===
Climate data for Mattoon, Illinois (1991–2020)
Month	Jan	Feb	Mar	Apr	May	Jun	Jul	Aug	Sep	Oct	Nov	Dec	Year
Mean daily maximum °F (°C)	34.8 (1.6)	39.6 (4.2)	51.3 (10.7)	64.4 (18.0)	74.3 (23.5)	82.8 (28.2)	86.1 (30.1)	84.5 (29.2)	79.2 (26.2)	66.4 (19.1)	51.2 (10.7)	39.7 (4.3)	62.9 (17.2)
Daily mean °F (°C)	27.5 (−2.5)	31.5 (−0.3)	42.1 (5.6)	53.8 (12.1)	64.1 (17.8)	73.3 (22.9)	76.4 (24.7)	74.8 (23.8)	67.9 (19.9)	56.5 (13.6)	42.7 (5.9)	32.5 (0.3)	53.6 (12.0)
Mean daily minimum °F (°C)	20.2 (−6.6)	23.4 (−4.8)	32.9 (0.5)	43.3 (6.3)	54.0 (12.2)	63.8 (17.7)	66.6 (19.2)	65.1 (18.4)	56.6 (13.7)	46.6 (8.1)	34.2 (1.2)	25.4 (−3.7)	44.3 (6.8)
Average precipitation inches (mm)	2.61 (66)	2.18 (55)	2.81 (71)	4.78 (121)	4.10 (104)	4.71 (120)	4.26 (108)	2.85 (72)	3.11 (79)	3.77 (96)	3.56 (90)	2.55 (65)	41.29 (1,047)
Average snowfall inches (cm)	5.2 (13)	3.6 (9.1)	1.9 (4.8)	0.1 (0.25)	0.0 (0.0)	0.0 (0.0)	0.0 (0.0)	0.0 (0.0)	0.0 (0.0)	0.0 (0.0)	0.6 (1.5)	3.1 (7.9)	14.5 (36.55)
Source: NOAA

== Demographics ==
Historical population
Census	Pop.	Note	%±
1880	5,737		—
1890	6,833		19.1%
1900	9,622		40.8%
1910	11,456		19.1%
1920	13,552		18.3%
1930	14,631		8.0%
1940	15,827		8.2%
1950	17,547		10.9%
1960	19,088		8.8%
1970	19,681		3.1%
1980	19,293		−2.0%
1990	18,441		−4.4%
2000	18,291		−0.8%
2010	18,555		1.4%
2020	16,870		−9.1%
U.S. Decennial Census

Mattoon is a principal city of the Charleston–Mattoon Micropolitan Statistical Area.

=== 2020 census ===
As of the 2020 census, Mattoon had a population of 16,870. The median age was 40.9 years. 21.1% of residents were under the age of 18 and 20.6% of residents were 65 years of age or older. For every 100 females there were 92.0 males, and for every 100 females age 18 and over there were 88.7 males age 18 and over.

99.1% of residents lived in urban areas, while 0.9% lived in rural areas.

There were 7,622 households in Mattoon, of which 25.2% had children under the age of 18 living in them. Of all households, 36.0% were married-couple households, 21.9% were households with a male householder and no spouse or partner present, and 32.9% were households with a female householder and no spouse or partner present. About 38.3% of all households were made up of individuals and 17.0% had someone living alone who was 65 years of age or older.

There were 8,685 housing units, of which 12.2% were vacant. The homeowner vacancy rate was 2.8% and the rental vacancy rate was 12.8%.

Racial composition as of the 2020 census
Race	Number	Percent
White	15,057	89.3%
Black or African American	548	3.2%
American Indian and Alaska Native	41	0.2%
Asian	112	0.7%
Native Hawaiian and Other Pacific Islander	0	0.0%
Some other race	174	1.0%
Two or more races	938	5.6%
Hispanic or Latino (of any race)	515	3.1%

== Economy ==
Mattoon is home to several companies. Rural King, which is a large retailer for agricultural supplies, has its headquarters located on the west side of town off of Dewitt Avenue. Other companies who have heavy focus in the area include Consolidated Communications, which is headquartered on Charleston Avenue, as well First Mid Bank & Trust, which has several important corporate facilities in the area. Other manufacturing plants include a Bimbo Bakeries USA plant, a Mars, Incorporated pet food plant, and Justrite. Sarah Bush Lincoln Health System and Carle Foundation Hospital provide many jobs in health care for Mattoon and its neighboring towns and communities, such as Charleston. Both hospitals and facilities are located right off the East side of Interstate 57, heading toward Charleston.

The Cross County Mall is the area's major shopping center. It opened in 1971 and it features Rural King, Marshalls, Jo-Ann Fabrics, and Dunham's Sports as its anchor locations. Coles Together is a non-profit economic development organization for Coles County based in Mattoon.

== Education ==
Mattoon is served by Mattoon Community Unit School District 2, one of three school districts located in the county of Coles. The district itself is composed of six schools-Franklin Preschool, Williams Elementary, Riddle Elementary, Mattoon Middle School, and Mattoon High School. A new Regional Innovation Center called LIFT opened in 2022.

Mattoon is also home to two private schools. St. John's Lutheran School (PreK-12) and Maranatha Christian Academy (K-12).

Lake Land College is a community college in Mattoon.

== Transportation ==
Transportation is still a vital part of local economic life. Much of the major commercial development in recent years has occurred along Interstate 57, which crosses the eastern edge of Mattoon. US Route 45 also makes its way through the city. The south end forms into Lake Land Boulevard, while the north end begins off of Dewitt Avenue.

=== Rail ===
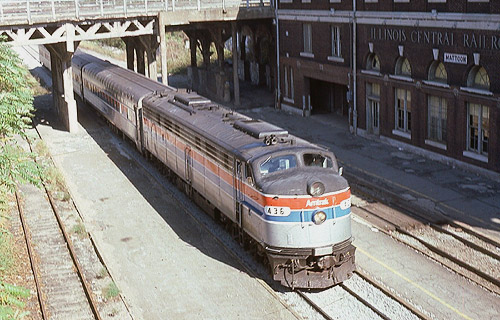
Amtrak Shawnee at Mattoon station, 1976

Amtrak, the national passenger rail system, provides service to Mattoon. Amtrak Train 59, the southbound City of New Orleans, is scheduled to depart Mattoon at 11:13pm daily with service to Effingham, Centralia, Carbondale, Fulton, Newbern-Dyersburg, Memphis, Greenwood, Yazoo City, Jackson, Hazlehurst, Brookhaven, McComb, Hammond, and New Orleans. Amtrak Train 58, the northbound City of New Orleans, is scheduled to depart Mattoon at 5:23am daily with service to Champaign-Urbana, Kankakee, Homewood, and Chicago. Mattoon is also served by Amtrak Train 390/391, the Saluki, daily in the morning, and Amtrak Train 392/393, the Illini, daily in the afternoon/evening. Both the Saluki and the Illini operate between Chicago and Carbondale.

The Illinois Central Station in the heart of downtown Mattoon has recently been totally renovated. It is handicap accessible with an elevator to the lower level train platform. Funding of $2.5 million was obtained for it via the 2005 Transportation Bill. Today the station is unmanned; passengers boarding at the Mattoon station must order their tickets by telephone or online.

=== Public transit ===
Transit service in Mattoon is provided by Dial-A-Ride Rural Public Transportation, which provides deviated fixed-route and demand-response services.

== Notable people ==
- Leverett Baldwin, Illinois state representative
- Hayden Birdsong, Major League Baseball pitcher for the San Francisco Giants
- Thomas Chrowder Chamberlin, geologist
- William Cook, founded medical products manufacturer The Cook Group
- Merab Eberle, journalist and playwright
- Roscoe Vernon "Gadabout" Gaddis, host of nationally syndicated TV show about fly fishing
- Patricia Roberts Harris, U.S. ambassador, politician, 1st Health and Human Services Secretary of the United States
- Steven Hatfill, physician, virologist, and bio-weapons expert
- Clyde Hood, fraudster founder of Omega Trust
- Kyle Hudson, former Major League Baseball player; born in Mattoon
- Joe Knollenberg, U.S. Congressman (1993–2009)
- Will Leitch, writer
- Robert A. McClure, Major General, Father of U.S. Army Special Warfare.
- Andy Miller, harness racing driver
- Jackie Moran, actor, The Adventures of Tom Sawyer, Buck Rogers
- Vickie M. Moseley, Illinois state politician
- Julius Penn, U.S. Army brigadier general in World War I
- Duane Purvis, All-American Football player, Indiana Hall of Fame Purdue
- Daniel Lee Siebert, serial killer
- Bryan Stork, former center for the New England Patriots
- Edward Mills Purcell, physicist, Nobel Laureate
- Monte Reel, writer and journalist
- Hope Summers, actress, known for role as Clara Edwards on The Andy Griffith Show
- Bill Tate, 1952 Rose Bowl most valuable player for Illinois, Mattoon High School graduate
- Craig Titley, writer
- Charlie Whitehouse, pitcher for various teams
- Arland D. Williams, Jr., hero of Air Florida Flight 90.
- David Wright, barbershop historian
