= Etna =

Mount Etna is an active volcano on the east coast of Sicily.

Etna or ETNA may also refer to:

== Places ==
=== United States ===
- Etna, California, a city
- Etna, Georgia, a village
- Etna, Illinois, an unincorporated community
- Etna, Indiana, an unincorporated town
- Etna, Kentucky, an unincorporated community
- Etna, Maine, a town
- Etna, Minnesota, an unincorporated community
- Etna, Missouri, an unincorporated community
- Etna, Nebraska, an unincorporated community
- Etna, Lincoln County, Nevada, a ghost town
- Etna, Pershing County, Nevada, a former townsite
- Etna, New Hampshire, a village
- Emerson, New Jersey, a borough originally named the Borough of Etna
- Etna, New York, an unincorporated community
- Etna, Lawrence County, Ohio, an unincorporated community
- Etna Township, Licking County, Ohio
- Etna, Licking County, Ohio, an unincorporated community
- Etna, Oklahoma, an unincorporated community
- Etna, Pennsylvania, a borough
- Whiteside, Tennessee, an unincorporated community formerly named Etna
- Etna, Texas, a ghost town
- Etna, Washington, an unincorporated community
- Etna, Wisconsin, an unincorporated community
- Etna, Wyoming, a census-designated place

=== Elsewhere ===
- Etna Bay, a district in West Papua, Indonesia
- Etna (river), in the traditional district of Valdres, Norway
- Etna Island, off the northeastern tip of the Antarctic Peninsula
- 11249 Etna, an asteroid
- Mount Etna, Queensland, a Mountain and a National Park in Australia
- Mount Etna, volcano in Sicily

== Ships ==
- HMS Aetna, a list of ships including those named Etna
- Etna-class corvette, six sailing ships of the French Navy
- Etna-class cruiser, four ships built for the Royal Italian Navy in the late 1880s
- Etna-class cruiser (1941), two ships ordered in Italy for the Royal Thai Navy in 1938, but never completed
- Etna-class replenishment oiler, one ship built for Italy and one ship for Greece
- Italian ship Etna (A 5326), the Italian Navy lead ship of the replenishment oiler class
- Italian ship Etna (A 5328), an attack cargo ship, originally built for the United States

== Other uses ==
- École des technologies numériques appliquées, a French private university in computer science
- Etna DOC, an Italian wine region designation
- Etna (Disgaea), a main character in the Disgaea series of console role playing games
- Etna Iron Works, a New York marine engine manufacturer active during the American Civil War
- Etna (novel), a 2026 novel by Paul Yoon
- Lotus Etna, a one-off concept car
- Etna, a steam locomotive of the Carmarthen and Cardigan Railway in Wales
- LG KS360, LG Etna, also known as LG KS360, a mobile phone model
- Obsolete name for the Bunsen burner or spirit lamp

== See also ==
- Aetna (disambiguation)
- Mount Aetna (disambiguation)
