= Aetna (disambiguation) =

Aetna is an American insurance provider.

Aetna may also refer to:

== Places ==
=== Canada ===
- Aetna, Alberta

=== United States ===
- Aetna (Gary), Indiana
- Aetna, Kansas
- Aetna, Michigan
- Aetna, Hickman County, Tennessee
- Aetna, Marion County, Tennessee
- Aetna Springs Resort, California
- Aetna Township (disambiguation), the name of several places
- Etna, Illinois, formerly Aetna
- Etna, Lawrence County, Ohio, formerly Aetna Furnace
- Whiteside, Tennessee, formerly Aetna

=== Other places ===
- Mount Etna (Latin: Aetna), Sicily, Italy
- Aetna (city), an ancient city of Sicily

== Other uses ==
- Aetna (nymph), a mythological Sicilian figure
- "Aetna", a poem ascribed to Lucilius Junior
- HMS Aetna, the name of several ships of the Royal Navy

== See also ==
- Mount Aetna (disambiguation)
- Etna (disambiguation)
- Aitne (disambiguation)
