= Court-martial of James, Lord Gambier =

1809 British naval legal case

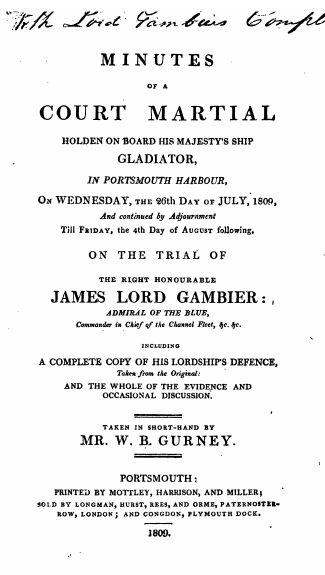
Coverpage of the minutes of Lord Gambier's court-martial, 1809.

The court-martial of James, Lord Gambier, was a notorious British naval legal case during the summer of 1809, in which Admiral Lord Gambier requested a court-martial to examine his behaviour during the Battle of the Basque Roads in April of the same year. Noted for the acrimony and corruption of proceedings, it has been described as "one of the ugliest episodes in the internal history of the Royal Navy".

Gambier was the Royal Navy commander of the Channel Fleet during the later Napoleonic Wars, primarily tasked with the blockade of the French Atlantic Fleet in Brest. In February 1809 the French fleet tried to break out into the Atlantic and was chased into the anchorage of Basque Roads near the river Charente. On 11 April a major attack was launched on the anchored fleet by fireships and over several days the French fleet was driven ashore and battered by an inshore squadron commanded by the maverick officer Lord Cochrane. Gambier, stationed just offshore with the main fleet, refused to support Cochrane and as a result, although damaged, most of the French fleet eventually escaped to safety.

On his return to Britain, Cochrane used his position as a Radical Member of Parliament to attempt to block an effort to thank Gambier formally for the victory, placing him in direct opposition to Prime Minister William Cavendish-Bentinck, 3rd Duke of Portland's administration and First Lord of the Admiralty Henry Phipps, 3rd Baron Mulgrave. Mulgrave warned Gambier of the position taken by Cochrane, who responded by demanding a public examination of his conduct via a court-martial. Convened at Portsmouth on 26 July 1809, the members of the court were deliberately chosen by Mulgrave to favour Gambier, and over the next eight days a call was issued for particular witnesses who largely discredited Cochrane with misleading evidence. When Cochrane was called to give evidence he was subjected to aggressive questioning, lost his temper and was officially reprimanded.

At the conclusion of the court-martial the members of the court unanimously found in Gambier's favour and despite Cochrane's best efforts Parliament voted thanks to Gambier. Gambier was restored to command and served in the Navy until his death in 1833. Despite popular support, Cochrane's resistance had alienated much of the naval and political establishment in Britain and not long afterwards he was implicated in the Great Stock Exchange Fraud of 1814, convicted and publicly humiliated. He was dismissed from the Royal Navy, although he was later pardoned and reinstated in 1832. Historians have subsequently sided with Cochrane.

== Background ==
In February 1809 the French Atlantic Fleet, based at Brest, was ordered to sail to the Caribbean. Since the outbreak of the Napoleonic Wars in 1803 the French Navy had suffered a series of defeats and the British were now threatening to invade the Caribbean island of Martinique. The fleet, under Contre-amiral Jean-Baptiste Willaumez, sailed on 22 February but was unable to escape British pursuit and four days later anchored in the sheltered position of Basque Roads at the mouth of the Charente, later retreating into the more-sheltered Aix Roads nearby, under the batteries of the fortified Île-d'Aix. A fleet from the British Channel Fleet, commanded by Admiral Lord Gambier, had followed Willaumez to the harbour and there enacted a close blockade. Gambier was an unpopular officer, whose reputation rested on being the first captain to break the French line at the Glorious First of June in 1794 in HMS Defence. Since then he had spent most of his career as an administrator at the Admiralty, earning the title Baron Gambier for his command of the fleet at the Bombardment of Copenhagen in 1807. A strict Methodist, Gambier was nicknamed "Dismal Jimmy" by his men.

While Gambier debated what action to take, Willaumez was censured for his failure to escape the British fleet and was replaced by Contre-amiral Zacharie Allemand, who strengthened the fleet's defences and awaited a British attack. In Britain, First Lord of the Admiralty Lord Mulgrave called on one of the nation's most popular, maverick young naval officers for a solution, Captain Lord Cochrane. Cochrane had operated off the Charente and knew the area well, but he was also a controversial choice for the operation. Placing him in command would mean by-passing a number of more senior officers, inevitably causing offense, while his status as a Radical Member of Parliament for Westminster made him an outspoken opponent of Prime Minister William Cavendish-Bentinck, 3rd Duke of Portland.

Cochrane initially refused the offer, but was later directly ordered to prepare and lead the operation, sailing to join Gambier in his ship, the frigate HMS Imperieuse. Cochrane arrived on 3 April, his orders causing a storm of controversy among the officers of the fleet, several of whom had been passed over by Cochrane's appointment. Rear-Admiral Eliab Harvey was so furious that he directly accused Gambier of incompetence and was sent back to Britain to face a court-martial for insubordination. Gambier expressed his misgivings about the attack but could not ignore a direct instruction from Mulgrave and so allowed Cochrane to proceed with the operation.

== Battle of the Basque Roads ==
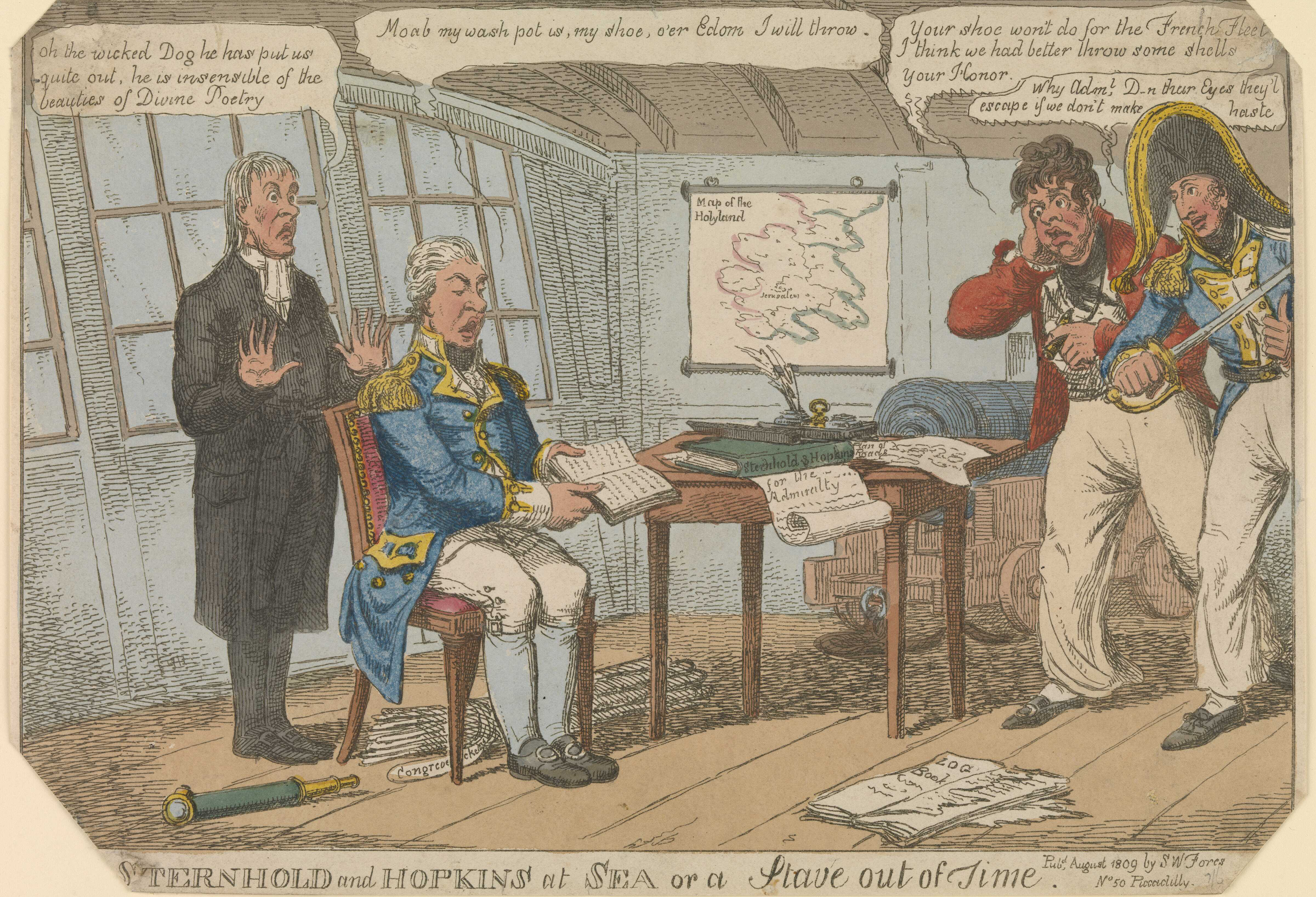
Sternhold and Hopkins at Sea; or a slave out of time. Charles Williams, 1809. A satirical print depicting Gambier and Cochrane during the Battle of the Basque Roads; Gambier is shown reading the Bible, ignoring Cochrane's request to pursue the French fleet

Cochrane fitted out 24 fireships and explosion vessels from the fleet transports and on the night of 11 April led them into the Roads, accompanied by a squadron of small vessels and the bomb vessel HMS Aetna. The fireships failed to ignite any of the French warships, but their presence caused panic among the French crews, who cut their anchor cables and drifted onto the rocks and shoals of the anchorage. When morning came, Cochrane found that almost the entire French fleet was at his mercy, and signalled to Gambier suggesting that if he would lead the British fleet into the Roads they could destroy the entire French force. Gambier did not respond, and eventually in frustration Cochrane led his own small force directly into combat with the French battle fleet. Unable to leave his subordinate unsupported, Gambier sent a small squadron of ships of the line to reinforce Cochrane, and on 12 April three French ships of the line and a large storeship were battered into surrender and then set on fire as damaged beyond repair.

Gambier then ordered the reinforcements to withdraw, leaving Cochrane again unsupported against the rest of the main French fleet which was gradually dragging itself off the shoals and into the relative safety of the Charente River. Despite a letter from Gambier suggesting he withdraw, Cochrane renewed his attack on 13 April but was unable to cause any significant damage to the French ships as they threw stores and guns overboard to facilitate their escape. On the morning of 14 April Gambier directly ordered Cochrane to retire, turning command of the operation over to Captain George Wolfe. Cochrane reluctantly complied, and on 15 April sailed back to Britain with dispatches.

Wolfe renewed attacks on the remaining stranded ships of the French fleet over the next week, but with little effect. The frigate Indienne, stuck since 11 April, was later burned by her own crew, but one by one the rest of the ships escaped until on 29 April the last, the ship of the line Régulus was withdrawn into the river. The battle concluded, Gambier sailed his fleet back to Britain. The engagement was a victory for the British, with five French ships destroyed and several others badly damaged, but there was much discontent in Britain, both among the Navy and the public, that a larger victory had been lost through over-caution. Cochrane was himself a leading voice in this discontent and very shortly provoked the anger of the Admiralty.

== The thanks ==
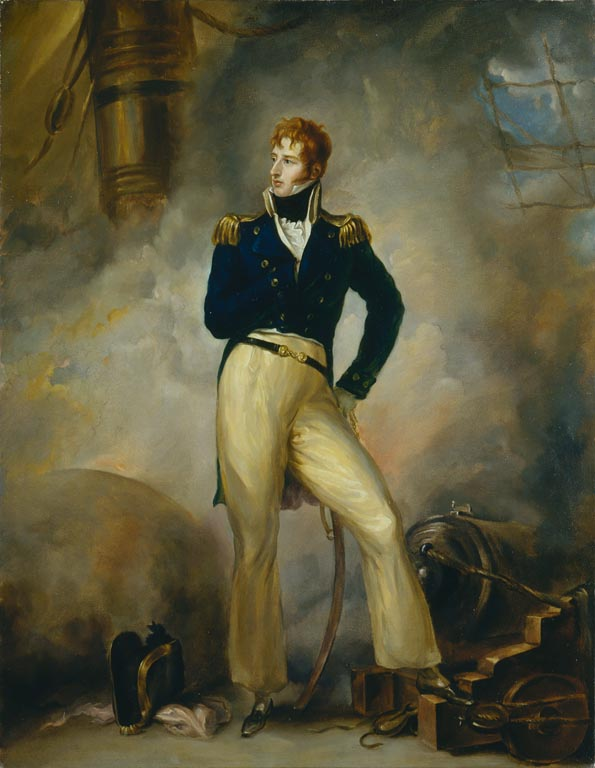
Copy of an 1807 portrait of Cochrane

Although Gambier's dispatch issued after the action stated that "I cannot speak in sufficient terms of admiration and applause of the vigorous and gallant attack made by Lord Cochrane", it also however contained many prevarications and inaccuracies: for example, he attributed command of the initial attack to Captain John Woolridge, who had commanded the biggest fireship, not to Cochrane who had planned, orchestrated and led the assault in person. He also claimed to have ordered an attack by the whole fleet on the beleaguered French force at daylight on the morning of the 12 April, but was frustrated by adverse winds, which was simply untrue; he had sent in a small squadron several hours after Cochrane's signal suggesting an attack, by which time several of the French ships had already escaped. He concluded by praising both Rear-Admiral Robert Stopford or Captain Sir Harry Neale, neither of whom took part in the fighting, stating that "handsome and earnest Manner in which both these meritorious Officers had volunteered their Services . . . and that, had not their Lordships fixed upon [Cochrane] to conduct the Enterprize, I have full Confidence that the Result of their Efforts would have been highly credible to them". He later produced a second dispatch that, under instruction from Mulgrave, failed to mention Cochrane at all.

Cochrane was already a popular and flamboyant figure in British public life, with a long history of outspoken military and political activity. He was lauded as the hero of the action and awarded membership of the prestigious Order of the Bath on 26 April, almost immediately after his return, but concern was already being expressed both within the Navy and in the press about the failure of the fleet to secure a greater victory over a vulnerable and panicked French force; an editorial in The Times attacked Gambier for hesitation. The government, seeking to capitalise on the victory, proposed a vote of thanks to Lord Gambier in the Houses of Parliament.

Cochrane was incensed, and visited Lord Mulgrave to warn him in no uncertain terms that if such thanks were proposed Cochrane would, in his position as Member of Parliament, lead a faction to oppose it. He made no direct reference to Gambier's conduct, but instead criticised the notion of giving thanks for only a partial victory, rendered incomplete by the inaction of the fleet. He described the vote as "public misrepresentation". Mulgrave was furious, replying that "Such a course will not only prove injurious to the Government, but highly detrimental to yourself, by raising up against you a host of enemies". Cochrane was unmoved, and refused to back down when Mulgrave first threatened him with the government's displeasure and then offered him a frigate squadron and infantry regiment of his own to conduct operations against the French as he wished without oversight should he drop the complaint.

== Gambier demands a court-martial ==
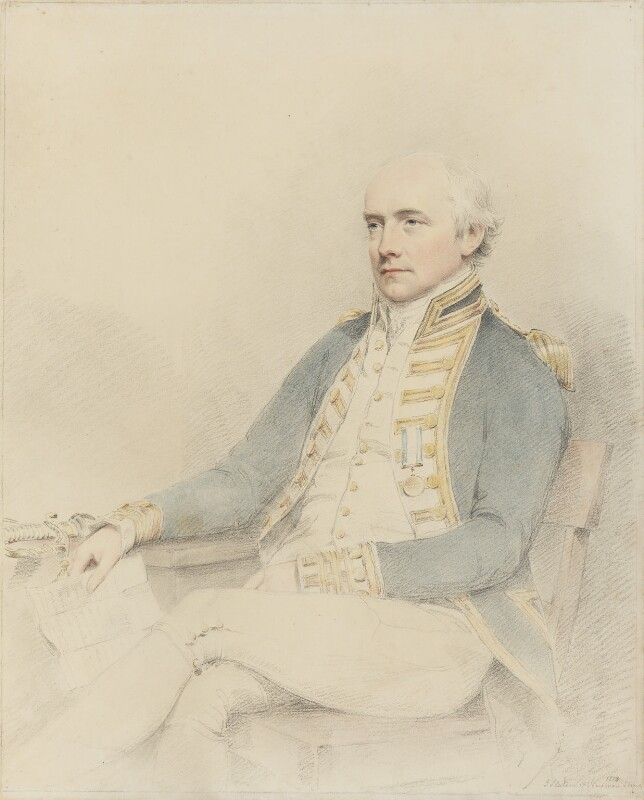
1813 portrait of Gambier, made four years after the court-martial

Mulgrave immediately notified Gambier of Cochrane's intentions and the admiral, aware that his competence and bravery were being called directly into question, demanded a court-martial to investigate his conduct. Gambier focused the court-martial on himself rather than his subordinate, as that greatly restricted Cochrane's ability to argue against him. As a witness, Cochrane could only respond to questions from the court at the court's convenience, while Gambier, as the defendant, was present throughout, free to provide lengthy written statements in his own defence, and to personally cross-examine all witnesses. When Cochrane was asked in advance of the trial to provide written specifics of his accusations against Gambier he refused on the grounds that it would be insubordinate, leaving the court-martial to set the terms of the charges. These were that "Admiral Lord Gambier, on the 12th day of the said month of April, the enemy's ships being then on shore, and the signal having been made that they could be destroyed, did, for a considerable time, neglect or delay taking effectual measures for destroying them". This narrow and specific charge was now the focus of the court.

Mulgrave and Gambier then contrived to pack the court with Gambier's supporters. The court-martial was scheduled for Portsmouth, thus ensuring that the president was Admiral Sir Roger Curtis, an old friend of Gambier who had served with him at the Glorious First of June. The deputy was Admiral Sir William Young, who had a long history of antagonism with Cochrane, who had publicly accused the admiral some years earlier of cheating him out of some prize money. The rest of the panel comprised vice-admirals Sir John Thomas Duckworth, an ally of Gambier, Sir Henry Edwyn Stanhope, Billy Douglas and George Campbell, Rear-Admiral John Sutton, whom Cochrane had previously accused of incompetence, and captains John Irwin, Robert Hall, Edward Stirling Dickson and Richard Dalling Dunn. The judge-advocate who oversaw proceedings was Moses Greetham and the prosecutor a Mr. Bicknell. By stacking the court with senior officers, Cochrane's opponents had ensured that those called to give evidence, whose careers relied on recommendations from men like those in the room, would not be free to express their honest opinions without risking their future advancement.

They also ensured that the witnesses were sympathetic to Gambier. Captain Frederick Maitland of HMS Emerald, who had fought alongside Cochrane in the Basque Roads and publicly supported his account of events, was sent on an extended cruise off the Irish coast and consequently not called as a witness, while Captain Francis Austen, another supporter (who had not been at Basque Roads), was omitted from witness lists. The lists, provided to the court by Gambier, list Cochrane separately from the flag officers and post captains directly under Gambier's command; Cochrane's name appears with the list of junior and warrant officers summoned as witnesses.

It was also ensured that the charts of the action placed before the court were prepared by senior warrant officers Thomas Stokes and Edward Fairfax of Gambier's flagship HMS Caledonia. Fairfax had seen action in the initial night attack, but neither officer had spent significant time in Aix Roads, or made their own soundings; their plans were based on captured French charts. Stokes even noted that "It cannot be expected that from the opportunities I had of sounding in this place, I could accurately point out the distance between the sands". Cochrane was not permitted to see the charts until the 1850s, and then only by special permission of Edward Seymour, 12th Duke of Somerset. These charts were revealed to greatly exaggerate the navigational hazards and defences of Basque Roads, including rendering the channel as half its actual width and most particularly depicting a large and dangerous shoal blocking the entrance to the anchorage that did not exist.

== Court-martial of Lord Gambier ==
The court-martial was convened on 26 July 1809 aboard HMS Gladiator, a hulk anchored in Portsmouth harbour. The charge was read to Lord Gambier and each member of the panel issued with a packet of documents comprising correspondence between Gambier and Secretary to the Admiralty W. W. Pole and both of Gambier's reports of the battle. A second packet of documents was also issued, which included additional correspondence and a report on the defences of Basque Roads from April 1807 by Commodore Richard Goodwin Keats, explaining his decision not to attack a French squadron anchored there at that time.

=== Day one ===
The first witnesses were Thomas Stokes, Master of HMS Caledonia, who had drafted the maps presented to the court, and Lieutenant Richard Hoskings of Caledonia, called to attest to the flagship's log book. They were followed by John Spurling, Master of HMS Imperieuse, who was closely questioned on his ability to reliably document signals in the midst of battle; he acknowledged that he had been unable to retain a complete record. The court then called Samuel Raven, Master of HMS Caesar, and John Thompson, Master's Mate of HMS Beagle, to attest to the accuracy of their logbooks.

It was at this point that Lord Cochrane was called to the stand. Cochrane was closely questioned for the rest of the day and much of the following morning, the first exchanges focusing on whether it was appropriate for Cochrane to make use of written recollections of the day in his evidence and then progressing to the geography of the anchorage. Cochrane insisted that the entrance was wide and deep enough for at least six ships to pass safely, but was denied permission to present his own charts to the court. He repeatedly requested the opportunity to read his prepared narrative of the battle to the court, but was denied, his ability to speak limited to answering the court's questions. Eventually Curtis intervened, supported by Young, to note that "I never in all my experience knew the document of a witness permitted to be received when he was present himself to be examined".

Cochrane was then closely questioned on a series of signals he made at midday on 12 April. In these signals he sent a series of warnings that the French ships were beginning to refloat, followed by the signal at 13:45 "the ship is in distress, and requires to be assisted immediately", indicating that Imperieuse was under fire. He had in fact deliberately allowed Imperieuse to drift within range of the French ships in an effort to provoke a reaction from Gambier. This discussion deteriorated into an extended argument about the propriety of Cochrane's use of notes, with particular interventions from Young and Stanhope. At the close of the first day, Cochrane asserted that Gambier's great mistake was not that he failed to attack on the afternoon of 12 April, but that he failed to attack in the morning when the French were most vulnerable. The proceedings were then held over until the morning.

=== Day two ===
Cochrane was recalled on the morning of 27 July and immediately accused Gambier of failing to support his operation. He reiterated his signals sent on the morning of the battle: "Half the fleet could destroy the enemy", and "The frigates alone can destroy the enemy". He accused Gambier of "unnecessary delay". He mentioned his assumption that Gambier paused so that the crews could eat lunch, stating, "I could not in any other way account for a proceeding, that thus enabled the helpless French ships to endeavour their escape". Under close questioning however, Cochrane lost his temper, refusing to directly answer questions put to him and instead giving lengthy answers that reflected poorly on Gambier's conduct. Eventually the court was cleared for a 20-minute discussion following which Cochrane was severely admonished by Curtis to answer only those questions put to him.

Cochrane did not fully comply with these instructions, and was further admonished for recounting conversations with other officers regarding Gambier's conduct, which the court ruled "inappropriate" hearsay. Cochrane then read out a letter sent to him by Gambier on the morning of 13 April, when much of the French fleet was still exposed, which urged him to withdraw, lest he "tarnish [the victory] by attempting impossibilities". In an attachment, Gambier permitted Cochrane one further attack on the French, but wrote "I do not think you will succeed; and I am anxious that you should come to me as I wish to send you to England as soon as possible". As his evidence concluded, Cochrane became irate once more, challenging the court that "I have felt that if I had answered yes or no to all the questions which have been put to me, I ought to be hung". There followed a series of exchanges regarding the reliability of Cochrane's charts, the threat from the fort on Île-d'Aix and the nature of signals issued on the night of 12 April before Cochrane withdrew.

The court then called Rear-Admiral Robert Stopford, who had led HMS Caesar into Aix Roads on the night of 12 April. Stopford fully supported Gambier's case and took full responsibility for withdrawing the squadron sent to reinforce Cochrane on 12 April during the following morning, citing the dangers of the anchorage, on which his own ship had grounded in the night. Bicknell then announced that the prosecution case was complete, but Curtis overruled him noting that the panel had further questions. The court was then adjourned for the evening.

=== Day three ===
At the start of 28 July Cochrane was briefly called again to answer questions about his charts and the discrepancies between them and those supplied to the court. He was followed by Stopford, who was further questioned about the movements of the ships sent to reinforce Cochrane on 12 April. Gambier was invited to question the witness and took the opportunity to discuss the bravery of a number of volunteers from Stopford's flagship who served on the fireships, two of whom were killed. Curtis then called the command of the fireship operation into question, asking whether "every fire-ship was conducted with equal ability and resolution toward the enemy". Sutton then questioned Stopford on the width of the entrance to Aix roads and the threat from the batteries of Île-d'Aix, Stopford's answer contradicting that of Cochrane.

The court briefly recalled John Spurling, who was questioned on the depth of the anchorage, whether Imperieuse had grounded during the operation and the strength of the batteries on Île-d'Aix. He was followed by Captain George Wolfe of HMS Aigle, who had assumed command from Cochrane on 14 April. When asked whether Gambier was to blame for any failings during the battle, he replied "I have no recollection of any thing of the kind". The court then called Captain John Tremayne Rodd of HMS Indefatigable, who had joined the attack on 12 April. Rodd also supported Gambier, and further noted that his ship had almost become grounded in the enemy anchorage and that he had no recollection of Cochrane urging him to disobey orders and continue the attack after being instructed to withdraw, something Cochrane had reported after the battle. With that, the case was adjourned; it sat briefly on Saturday 29 July and was then adjourned until Monday, 31 July.

=== Day five ===
The day was reserved for Gambier's testimony. The admiral, as the defendant, was permitted to provide a full written statement to the court, read by Moses Greetham. Cochrane petitioned the court to be allowed to remain for the testimony, but Curtis dismissed him with the comment "I have never heard of such a thing in my life". Gambier's testimony ran to 34 pages and started by stating his indignation at having to answer "loose and indirect accusations of an officer, so much his inferior in rank". and accused Cochrane of attempting to "exalt his own reputation at the expense of mine". He justified his conduct by saying "however highly courage is to be viewed in an officer, it is always incomplete in its consequences, without the equal exercise of judgement and discretion".

Gambier's lengthy account of his plans for the operation, and his conduct during it, match that described in his dispatches, although in greater detail. Cochrane barely features, except where Gambier describes his proposals for a general attack on the stranded French fleet as "preposterous and impractical". Gambier notes that his chief concern was that should a ship have been severely damaged in the narrow waterway it would have been impossible to retrieve it, "the consequence of which could scarcely have been less than their utter destruction". and warned that "if the impression arising out of this inquiry should prove less favourable to Lord Cochrane . . . his Lordship must be sensible that, as the instigator of this Court-Martial, he will himself be the instigator of this change of sentiment".

There followed brief testimony from John Dyer, an Admiralty clerk, John Spurling again and then John Wilkinson, Secretary to Lord Gambier, to attest to the accuracy of some of the documents presented to the court. There was then a close examination by Gambier of Edward Fairfax, Master of the Fleet and drafter of the charts presented to the court, followed by the recalled Thomas Stokes. Both officers testified as to the accuracy of their charts and corroborated Gambier's evidence of the disposition of the anchorage and of the French fleet. Gambier then called Captain John Bligh of HMS Valiant, who led the reinforcements on 12 April. Bligh described his ships as in "a perilous situation", and testified that they were in danger of being wrecked. The court was then adjourned once more.

=== Day six ===
Bligh was called again on the morning of 1 August, testifying that he had overheard Cochrane stating that if Gambier had led the fleet into the anchorage on 12 April, three of four British ships might have been lost. Thomas Stokes was recalled to attest to the relative positions of the French and British ships on the charts before Gambier called Captain John Beresford, captain of HMS Theseus, which entered the anchorage on the evening of 12 April but was not heavily engaged. Beresford described Cochrane's signals on the day of the battle as "very improper" and "impossible", and reiterated Gambier's concern that he may have suffered heavy losses had he attacked Aix Roads with his fleet.

Beresford was followed by Captain Alexander Robert Kerr of HMS Revenge who had been heavily engaged in the battle, and who had first served under Gambier 28 years earlier. Kerr was clear in his support for Gambier, averring that if, as Cochrane desired, "had ships gone in sooner, they would have been crippled" by French counter-fire. Samuel Raven was recalled and cross-examined as to the locations of the stranded French ships in Aix Roads, followed by Captain Stair Douglas of HMS Bellona, who stated of Gambier that "I do not know of any neglect whatever" in his conduct. Douglas was followed by Captain William Godfrey, whose bomb vessel HMS Aetna was engaged throughout the battle and who also supported Gambier's narrative, after which Lt. Hockings was once more called to give testimony on the signals during the battle, then corroborated by the Signal's Mate on Caledonia, Samuel Sparshott.

Edward Fairfax was briefly recalled to discuss the night attack on 11 April and then Rodd was briefly recalled. Gambier then recalled his secretary John Wilkinson and questioned him as to Cochrane's conduct during his brief conference with Gambier on 14 April. This evidence was halted by Curtis, who gently admonished Gambier for asking directly whether Cochrane had discussed the admiral's "conduct or misconduct" with any officers on board Caledonia. Curtis raised "doubts entertained as to the strict propriety of this; it is commenting on the conduct of officers whose conduct is not called into question, and I think it might be attended with very unpleasant consequences". Gambier then offered to rest his case, but Curtis suggested that he wait until the following day before deciding whether to conclude.

=== Day seven ===
On 2 August Stopford and Hockings were briefly called to clarify portions of their testimony. Gambier then reopened his case, having decided overnight to call more captains of the fleet to testify. Sir Harry Neale, Gambier's flag captain, was called first and recounted Cochrane's distrust of the official Neptune François maps used by the fleet in planning the action. He was followed by Captain Lucius Hardyman, whose frigate HMS Unicorn had been heavily engaged in Aix Roads on 12 April. Hardyman supported Gambier's case, stating "I do not know of any neglect or unnecessary delay" in the attack on the French force.

Captain George Francis Seymour of the frigate HMS Pallas, heavily engaged during the battle, was then called. Seymour was the first officer other than Cochrane to offer criticism of Gambier's conduct, stating that reinforcements could have been sent into Aix Roads at 11:00 on 12 April, some three hours earlier than the time of their eventual deployment. He was challenged in this assertion by Admiral Young, "If I understood the intent of that observation, it was advanced as an instance of either neglect, misconduct, or inattention in the Commander in Chief". Seymour refused to answer and was further questioned as to his meaning by Curtis before his evidence was brought abruptly to a close.

Captain Francis Newcombe of the brig HMS Beagle was next called, and complained about Cochrane's conduct, the latter having fired shot in the direction of his vessels during the battle as a means of encouraging him to engage the enemy more closely. He did however agree with Seymour that reinforcements might have been sent in earlier although he countered by noting that they would have been under considerable fire from the fort on Île-d'Aix. Hockings was briefly called again, followed by Kerr, Stopford and Wolfe. The court then briefly called Captain Pulteney Malcolm of HMS Donegal, who stated that an attack before noon would have been highly dangerous. The court was then adjourned.

=== Day eight ===
The last day of evidence, 3 August, first saw Kerr recalled to correct some minor points before Malcolm retook the stand. Malcolm then testified that although an attack before noon would have been hazardous, in his opinion an attack on the main French fleet should have been made regardless of the hazards and that there was some unnecessary delay, albeit small, in Gambier's order to dispatch reinforcements. He also suggested that ships of the line might have been sent in earlier had they removed the large quantities of stores they carried to reduce their draught, although acknowledged that since the fleet's transports had been used as fireships in the initial attack, this may have meant throwing the stores overboard.

The court then called Captain George Burlton of HMS Resolution, Captain Henry Lidgbird Ball of HMS Gibraltar and Captain James Newman-Newman of HMS Hero, none of whom were engaged in the action and all of whom testified in Gambier's favour. The final witness was Captain William Broughton of HMS Illustrious, who had reconnoitred Île-d'Aix on 1 April. He gave an extensive report on the state of the island's fortifications. Broughton then gave evidence which agreed with that of Seymour, noting that he believed that an earlier attack on the French fleet, between 11:00 and 12:00 on 12 April might have achieved better results and he noted that there was no shoal blocking the entrance to the Roads, as depicting in the charts presented to the court. Kerr and Bligh were each briefly called in once more, and then the court adjourned a final time, with the verdict expected on the following morning.

=== Verdict ===
On the morning of the ninth day, 4 August, Gambier made his final summation and the court ruled against an application from Cochrane to present further evidence. The court was then cleared for deliberations, reconvening at 13:00. The verdict was then read by Moses Greetham, concluding that:

Having heard the evidence produced in support of the charge, and by the Right Honourable Lord Gambier in his defence, and what his Lordship had to allege in support thereof; and having maturely and deliberately weighed and considered the whole, the Court is of the opinion, that the charge . . . has not been proved against the said Admiral the Right Honourable Lord Gambier; but that his Lordship's conduct on that occasion . . . was marked by ZEAL, JUDGEMENT, ABILITY and an anxious Attention to the Welfare of His Majesty's service, and doth adjudge him to be MOST HONOURABLY ACQUITTED.

Following the verdict, Curtis ceremonially returned Gambier's sword which had been surrendered to the court at the start of proceedings, at which Gambier thanked him and the panel for the "obliging manner in which you have conveyed to me their sentiments".

== Aftermath ==
Gambier's exoneration was reported in much of the British press, who had followed the trial closely, particularly in The Times, and broad public support for Cochrane remained strong. The effect in the Navy however was quite the opposite; Admiral James Bowen wrote "It will be a lesson to restless and inexperienced young officers not to hazard a mischievous opinion", and Lord Collingwood, a patron of Cochrane, hoped that the verdict would free him of bad influences. Cochrane was "to all intents and purposes, officially disgraced"; he later wrote that the effect was that "From this time forward I never trod the deck of a British ship of war at sea, as her commander, till thirty-nine years afterwards".

In January 1810 the vote of official thanks to Gambier went ahead in Parliament, passing with 161 votes to 39, Cochrane leading the Radical faction in opposition and succeeding in getting the minutes of the court-martial produced in Parliament. Separate votes of thanks to the officers and the seamen of the fleet both passed unanimously. Congratulations were sent to Gambier on his legal defence and subsequent victory from allies such as William Wilberforce of the Church Missionary Society and Hannah More of the Blue Stockings Society. Gambier retained command of the Channel Fleet until 1811, when he returned to shore service. He died in 1833 as a Knight Grand Cross of the Order of the Bath and an Admiral of the Fleet. The effect on Cochrane was profound; one biographer has written that this trial "deeply embittered" Cochrane, whose "natural boldness and insubordination was to be transformed into a streak of foolhardiness and even quixotic eccentricity. It was the turning point of his life". He was ordered to return to service with the Mediterranean Fleet, but refused, becoming a constant irritant to the Admiralty in Parliament. In 1813 he was called for service in the War of 1812, but shortly thereafter was implicated in the Great Stock Exchange Fraud of 1814. He was tried, convicted and disgraced. In his later career he found success serving in the Chilean Navy, the Imperial Brazilian Navy and as commander-in-chief of the Hellenic Navy during the Greek War of Independence. He was finally reinstated to the Royal Navy in 1832 after a pardon from King William IV, and served until his death in 1860.

The entire affair has been heavily criticised by British historians. William James noted in 1827 that "we cannot refrain from observing, that several of members, particularly the president (Sir Roger Curtis) and Admiral Young, evinced a strong bias in favour of the accused". He further notes that much of Gambier's evidence, accepted at trial without comment, was inaccurate. In 1900, William Laird Clowes agreed, noting that Gambier "was fortunate" in the verdict. More recent historians have been more pronounced in their opinions, Richard Woodman noted in 2001 that Cochrane "was browbeaten and forbidden to ask questions" and called Gambier "stupid". Perhaps the most unexpected opinion came from the Emperor Napoleon, who years later told an English correspondent that Cochrane "could not only have destroyed [the French ships], . . . but he might and would have taken them out, had your admiral supported him as he ought to have done . . . The French admiral was a fool, but yours was just as bad".

== Bibliography ==
- Adkins, Roy & Lesley (2006). The War for All the Oceans: from Nelson at the Nile to Napoleon at Waterloo. London: Abacus. ISBN 978-0-349-11916-8.
- Clowes, William Laird (1997) [1900]. The Royal Navy, A History from the Earliest Times to 1900, Volume V. London: Chatham Publishing. ISBN 1-86176-014-0.
- Cochrane, Thomas (2000) [1860]. The Autobiography of a Seaman. London: Lyons Press. ISBN 1-58574-061-6.
- Cochrane (ii), Thomas (1996) [1860]. The Autobiography of a Seaman, Vol II. London: Constable. ISBN 0-09-475180-3.
- Cordingley, David (2007). Cochrane the Dauntless. London: Bloomsbury Publishing. ISBN 978-0-7475-8088-1.
- Gurney, W.B. (1809). Minutes of a court-martial . . . on the trial of James Lord Gambier. London: Mottey, Harrison & Miller.
- Harvey, Robert (2000). Cochrane: The Life and Exploits of a Fighting Captain. London: Constable. ISBN 1-84119-162-0.
- James, William (2002) [1827]. The Naval History of Great Britain, Volume 5, 1808–1811. London: Conway Maritime Press. ISBN 0-85177-909-3.
- Mostert, Noel (2007). The Line upon a Wind: The Greatest War Fought at Sea Under Sail 1793 – 1815. London: Vintage Books. ISBN 9-78071-260-9272.
- Tracy, Nicholas (1998). Who's Who in Nelson's Navy; 200 Naval Heroes. London: Chatham Publishing. ISBN 1-86176-244-5.
- Woodman, Richard (2001). The Sea Warriors. London: Constable Publishers. ISBN 1-84119-183-3.
