= Run Me to Earth =

2020 novel by Paul Yoon

- First edition cover
- Author: Paul Yoon
- Audio read by: Ramón de Ocampo
- Language: English
- Genre: Historical
- Set in: Laos, France, New York and Spain
- Publisher: Simon & Schuster
- Publication date: January 28, 2020
- Publication place: United States
- Media type: Print (hardcover and paperback), e-book, audiobook
- Pages: 272
- ISBN: 978-1-5011-5404-1 (hardcover)
- OCLC: 1091235516
- Dewey Decimal: 813/.6
- LC Class: PS3625.O54 R86 2020

Run Me to Earth is a 2020 novel by Paul Yoon. It is his second novel and was published by Simon & Schuster on January 28, 2020. The novel tells the story of three orphans in Laos during the Laotian Civil War and follows the trajectories of their lives after they are separated. The novel follows multiple characters in a third-person omniscient narrative and is divided into six stories that take place over the course of six decades. It received positive reviews and was longlisted for the 2021 Andrew Carnegie Medal for Excellence in Fiction.

== Background ==
Between May 23, 1959 and December 2, 1975, Laos was engaged in a civil war between the Communist Pathet Lao and the Royal Lao Government. The Royal Lao Government was supported by the United States, which wanted to stop the spread of communism throughout Southeast Asia. The Central Intelligence Agency's paramilitary operation trained ethnic groups including the Hmong as guerilla fighters against the Pathet Lao. Between 1964–1973, the CIA conducted a massive bombing effort in Laos. 580,000 bombing missions took place over the nine-year campaign, with the US dropping over two million tons of bombs. The bombings totaled more than the amount dropped on both Nazi Germany and the Empire of Japan during World War II. However, thirty percent of the bombs did not detonate. The unexploded ordnance that has continued to maim and kill Laotians. In the author's note to Run Me to Earth, Paul Yoon writes: "While Run Me to Earth focuses on this time period and these events, its story—and the characters and the situations depicted—is an act of imagination."

As explained in the novel's acknowledgements, Yoon significantly altered the geography of Laos and the timeline of the civil war to fit the story, in particular changing the timeline of the bombings on the Plain of Jars. He also fictionalized the town of Phonsavan as well as the surrounding area of the Canigou in southern France.

== Plot ==
Run Me to Earth is divided into six stories that extend over the course of six decades, primarily between 1969–1977. The novel begins in 1969 but later jumps to 1974 and 1977, before moving back to 1969 and then finally jumping forward to 1994 and 2018. It takes place mostly in Laos but also in New York, Spain and rural France. The novel employs a third-person omniscient narrative, alternating its focus between the different characters. Stream of consciousness is often used to reveal the characters' inner thoughts.

=== Alisak (1969) ===
In 1969 in Laos during the Laotian Civil War, Alisak and brother and sister Prany and Noi are homeless teenage orphans who have been friends since childhood. The three orphans are spotted sleeping by a river by a nurse who recruits them to work for a hospital overlooking the Plain of Jars. It is a makeshift field hospital housed in an abandoned farmhouse that was formerly run as a tobacco plantation owned by a French tycoon known as the Tobacco Captain, who has since gone missing. The three orphans work as orderlies in the hospital and couriers, delivering medical supplies on motorbikes left by the Tobacco Captain. They driver over hazardous terrain into the town of Phonsavan, risking the threat of aerial bombings and unexploded cluster bombs. They form a friendship with Vang, the French doctor who runs the hospital. They wonder where they will go once the hospital is evacuated, speculating either Thailand or France. The brother of the Tobacco Captain, a country doctor, offers to sponsor the three orphans into France. Vang later announces the return of American planes and the hospital is evacuated. While riding on their motorbikes toward the helicopter, they are separated. Alisak is sent to Perpignan in Southern France. He is driven by a Thai women named Karawek. They arrive at "the Vineyard" where Alisak is greeted by the Tobacco Captain's brother, who he learns is named Yves. He later meets a woman named Marta, who works at "the Vineyard".

=== Auntie (1974) ===
Auntie last saw Prany and Vang four years prior in a camp before it was raided and burned. Auntie and Vang were childhood friends growing up in Vientiane, Laos. Prany and Vang were captured by the Pathet Lao four years ago. Touby tells Auntie that Prany and Vang are in a prison in the northeast close to Vietnam, where they share a cell and are tortured by "the interrogator" and two other men. Prany has lost the use of one of his hands. When Vang and Prany came to her camp, they rarely spoke to each other. Auntie remembers when Vang told her that despite pleas from the helicopter, Prany had turned and went back for them. When Vang tried to speak of Noi, he began to weep.

=== Prany (1977) ===
Prany and Vang are released after seven years in the reeducation center. When they are released, Prany and Vang plot revenge on "the interrogator" and kill him. Prany later meets Khit, and together they travel to the old farmhouse hospital. Prany takes a doctor's coat and puts it on, finding an old piece of paper with a circle written on it. He puts it back in the pocket, knowing it "belonged only there, in a private memory." He is met by Auntie, who he tells to bring Khit to Thailand instead of himself. Prany gives his envelope of money to Auntie, who believes Prany will be caught for his actions but agrees to take Khit. Prany makes Khit promise to remember the name "Alisak". He takes off the doctor's coat and puts it on Khit. He later realizes he left the piece of paper in the pocket of the coat.

=== Noi (1969) ===
Noi remembers working for "the Frenchman"–the Tobacco Captain–in his kitchen and cleaning up after parties in his house. Vang tells Noi that they are leaving that night for France. The four of them–Alisak, Prany, Vang and Noi–ride towards the helicopters on motorbike, with a nurse traveling with Noi on her bike. Noi swerves hard and goes over a bump while riding fast. She searches for Alisak then finds him looking back at her with an expression which Noi views as "the greatest gift, like something wonderful and old, as though, like some unrecognized promise, they had been given a chance, all of them together, to become old." Noi lets go of the handlebars and the nurse leans into her, screaming. For Noi, "it was, just then, in all that sudden, immense quiet, enough."

=== Khit (1994) ===
Khit travels to Perpignan, where she meets Marta. She tells Marta that she spent two years in Thailand at Auntie's camp. Auntie convinced a couple to pretend that Khit was their daughter, and they moved to Jackson Heights, Queens in New York City before moving to Poughkeepsie, New York. Khit learns that Prany and Vang were charged with the murder of the interrogator and executed. Marta tells Khit that Alisak may be in Sa Tuna, Spain. Khit travels to Spain, where she meets Isabel. With a seventeen-year-old piece of paper in her pocket, she walks to Alisak's shop and ring's the bell by the door.

=== Sa Tuna, Spain (2018) ===
Alisak thinks of Prany and Noi and the hilltop where they built their first successful fire. Alisak, sixty-six years old, is working at a bicycle and moped shop in northeastern Spain. He is going to a birthday party for the father of Isabel, whose uncle Alisak used to work with. He thinks of Khit, who came to his shop years ago and gave him a piece of paper she believed belonged to Prany. As Alisak arrives at the party and looks along the bright seaside towns, he is reminded once again of the hilltop, the sound of animals, the river moving below and the "three children fighting sleep so that they can catch the last moments of a small pocket of fire."

== Title ==
The novel's title is taken from W. S. Merwin's poem "Peire Vidal", which is quoted at the beginning of Run Me to Earth following the author's note:

I have worn the fur of a wolf and the shepherd's dogs have run me to earth...

== Publication and promotion ==
Run Me to Earth was published by Simon & Schuster on January 28, 2020.

On February 6, 2020, Yoon promoted the novel in an appearance on Late Night with Seth Meyers.

== Reception ==
Kirkus Reviews gave the novel a favorable review, writing, "Yoon's imaginative prose and affection for his characters make the story larger than a look at the ways people survive."

Publishers Weekly called the novel "a finely wrought tale about courage and endurance" and praised Yoon's "eloquent, sensitive character study of Alisak."

In his review for The New York Times, writer Tash Aw called the novel an "intense meditation on the devastating nature of war and displacement."

The novel was longlisted for the 2021 Andrew Carnegie Medal for Excellence in Fiction.

== Acknowledgements ==
In the acknowledgements section of Run Me to Earth, Paul Yoon lists the works he referenced and incorporated into the novel:

- Kurlantzick, Joshua (2017). A Great Place to Have a War: America in Laos and the Birth of a Military CIA. Simon & Schuster. ISBN 978-1-4516-6786-8.
- BBC and the Mines Advisory Group
- Obama, Barack (September 6, 2016). Remarks of President Obama to the People of Laos (Speech). Lao National Cultural Hall, Vientiane, Laos.
- Andelman, David A. (October 24, 1976). "Laos after the Takeover". The New York Times.
- Evans, Grant (1998). The Politics of Ritual and Remembrance: Laos Since 1975. University of Hawai'i Press. ISBN 978-0-8248-2054-1.
- Evans, Grant (2002). A Short History of Laos: The Land in Between. Allen & Unwin. ISBN 978-1-86448-997-2.
- Eisenhower, Dwight D. (April 7, 1954). Domino theory (Speech). Old Executive Office Building, Washington, D.C.
- Pholsena, Vatthana (2006). Post-war Laos: The Politics of Culture, History, and Identity. Cornell University Press. ISBN 978-0-8014-4503-3.
- poems of Mai Der Vang
- Sneeden, Ralph (October 11, 2018). "Blaenavon". The Common.
