= Paradise Township, Coles County, Illinois =

Paradise Township
- Township
- Location in Coles County

- Coles County's location in Illinois
- Coordinates: 39°24′N 88°25′W
- Country: United States
- State: Illinois
- County: Coles
- Established: November 8, 1859

Area
  - Total: 23.87 sq mi (61.8 km^{2})
  - Land: 23.33 sq mi (60.4 km^{2})
  - Water: 0.54 sq mi (1.4 km^{2}) 2.26%
- Elevation: 673 ft (205 m)

Population (2020)
  - Total: 959
  - Density: 41.1/sq mi (15.9/km^{2})
- Time zone: UTC-6 (CST)
  - Summer (DST): UTC-5 (CDT)
- ZIP codes: 61928, 61938, 62447, 62469
- FIPS code: 17-029-57615

Paradise Township is one of twelve townships in Coles County, Illinois, USA. As of the 2020 census, its population was 959 and it contained 599 housing units.

== Geography ==
According to the 2010 census, the township has a total area of 23.87 square miles (61.8 km^{2}), of which 23.33 square miles (60.4 km^{2}) (or 97.74%) is land and 0.54 square miles (1.4 km^{2}) (or 2.26%) is water.

=== Cities, towns, villages ===
- Mattoon (southwest edge)

=== Unincorporated towns ===
- Etna
- Paradise

(This list is based on USGS data and may include former settlements.)

=== Cemeteries ===
The township contains four cemeteries: Campground, Dry Grove, Old Baptist and Zion Hill.

=== Major highways ===
- Interstate 57
- US Route 45
- Illinois Route 121

== Demographics ==
As of the 2020 census there were 959 people, 439 households, and 290 families residing in the township. The population density was 40.29 inhabitants per square mile (15.56/km^{2}). There were 599 housing units at an average density of 25.17 units per square mile (9.72 units/km^{2}). The racial makeup of the township was 93.43% White, 0.83% African American, 0.42% Native American, 0.42% Asian, 0.00% Pacific Islander, 0.73% from other races, and 4.17% from two or more races. Hispanic or Latino of any race were 3.86% of the population.

There were 439 households, out of which 29.60% had children under the age of 18 living with them, 57.40% were married couples living together, 0.00% had a female householder with no spouse present, and 33.94% were non-families. 25.50% of all households were made up of individuals, and 21.20% had someone living alone who was 65 years of age or older. The average household size was 2.43 and the average family size was 2.90.

The township's age distribution consisted of 24.4% under the age of 18, 9.1% from 18 to 24, 13.6% from 25 to 44, 26.3% from 45 to 64, and 26.6% who were 65 years of age or older. The median age was 45.9 years. For every 100 females, there were 122.5 males. For every 100 females age 18 and over, there were 131.2 males.

The median income for a household in the township was $37,435, and the median income for a family was $70,972. Males had a median income of $56,625 versus $19,485 for females. The per capita income for the township was $22,993. About 6.2% of families and 15.7% of the population were below the poverty line, including 27.5% of those under age 18 and 0.0% of those age 65 or over.

Historical population
Census	Pop.	Note	%±
2010	1,351		—
2020	959		−29.0%
U.S. Decennial Census

== School districts ==
- Mattoon Community Unit School District 2
- Neoga Community Unit School District 3

== Political districts ==
- Illinois's 15th congressional district
- State House District 110
- State Senate District 55
