= Aitne =

Aitne may refer to:

- Aitne (moon), one of Jupiter's moons
- Aetna (nymph), or Aitne, in Greek mythology

== See also ==
- Aetna (disambiguation)
