= Etna-class replenishment oiler =

Italian and Greek naval logististics ships

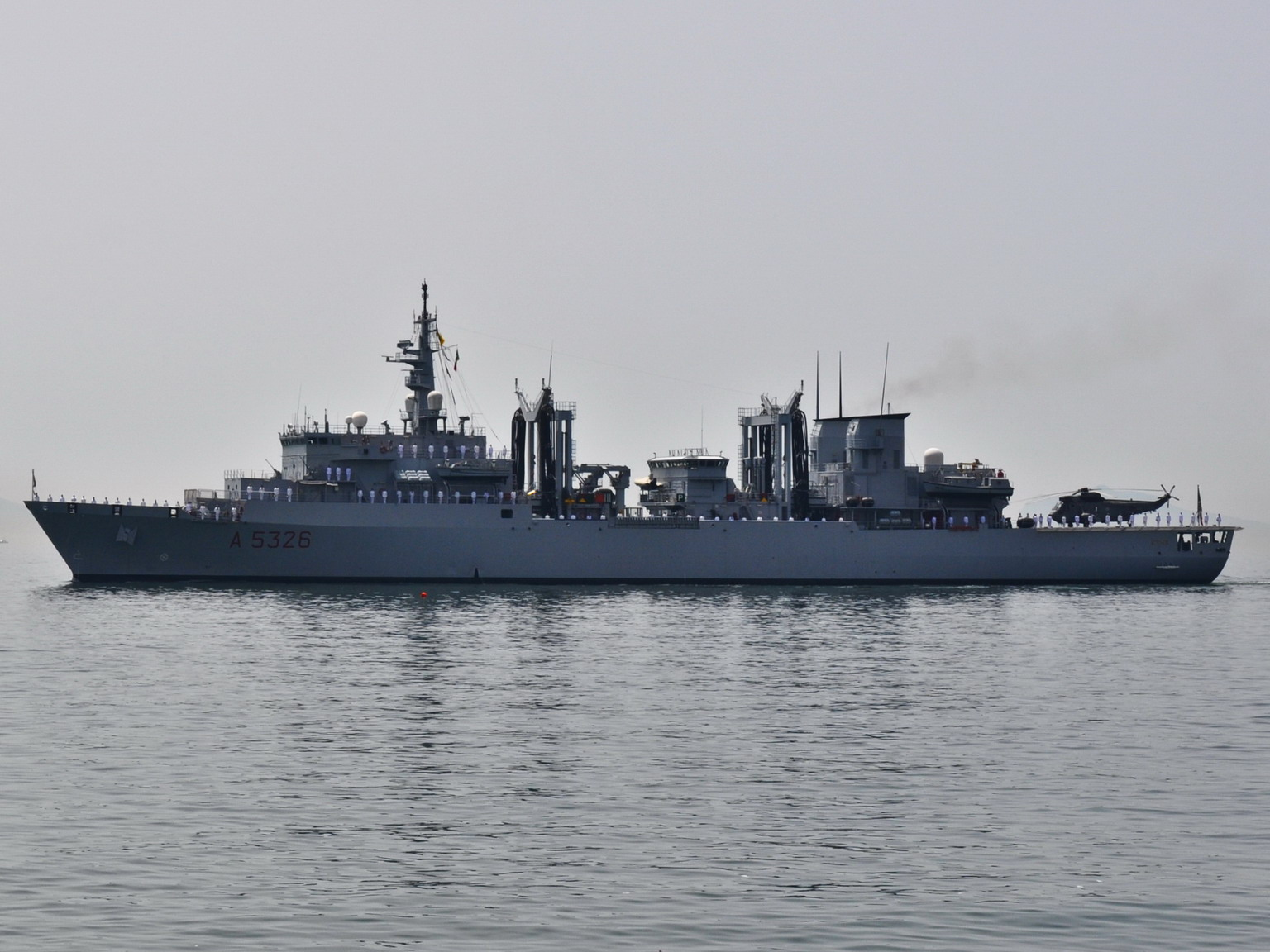
- Etna at Naples in 2010

Class overview
- Name: Etna class
- Builders: Italcantieri - Cantieri Navali del Tirreno e Riuniti, Riva Trigoso; Elefsis Shipyards
- Operators: Italian Navy; Hellenic Navy
- In commission: 1998–present
- Completed: 2
- Active: 2

General characteristics
- Type: Replenishment oiler/Command ship
- Displacement: 13,400 t (13,200 long tons) full load; 5,980 t (5,890 long tons) standard
- Length: 146.6 m (481 ft 0 in) LOA
- Beam: 21 m (68 ft 11 in)
- Draught: 7.25 m (23 ft 9 in)
- Depth: 7.4 m (24 ft 3 in)
- Propulsion: 2 × shafts; 2 × 12V-ZAV-405 diesel engines, 17,290 kW (23,190 hp)
- Speed: 21 knots (39 km/h; 24 mph)
- Range: 7,600 nmi (14,100 km; 8,700 mi)
- Complement: up to 240
- Sensors & processing systems: Etna: 1 × surface radar RASS radar (X-band); Prometheus: 1 × AN/SPS-10D surface radar (G-band)
- Armament: Etna: 2 × 25 mm (0.98 in)/90-calibre guns; Prometheus: 8 × 20 mm (0.79 in) guns
- Aircraft carried: 1 × helicopter
- Aviation facilities: 28 m × 21 m (92 ft × 69 ft) flight deck; hangar capable of storing 1 × helicopter
- Notes: 4 × replenishment at sea (RAS) systems; 1 × RAS aft station for the supply of oil

The Etna class is a ship class of two naval replenishment and logistic support ships in operation by the Italian Navy and the Hellenic Navy. The two ships have similar hulls but have differences in their armament and sensor equipment.

== General characteristics ==
The first ship of the class, Etna, measures 146.6 metres (481 ft 0 in) long overall with a beam of 21 m (68 ft 11 in) and a draught of 7.25 m (23 ft 9 in). The ship has a standard displacement of 5,980 tonnes (5,890 long tons) and a full load displacement of 13,400 t (13,200 long tons). Designated a "command and logistics ship" by the Italian Navy, the vessel is powered by two Sulzer 12V-ZAV-405 diesel engines turning two shafts creating 17,290 kilowatts (23,190 hp). This gives the ship a maximum speed of 21 knots (39 km/h; 24 mph) and a range of 7,600 nautical miles (14,100 km; 8,700 mi) at 18 knots (33 km/h; 21 mph). Etna can be operated by a crew numbering as few as 160 or as many as 240 personnel.

Etna has capacity for 5,795 t (5,703 long tons) of fuel oil, 1,585 t (1,560 long tons) of aviation fuel, 30 t (30 long tons) of lubrication oil, and 160 t (160 long tons) of fresh water. The ship also has 2,100 cubic metres (74,000 cu ft) of capacity for ammunition and other stores. The vessel is fitted with two 50-tonne cranes. The vessel is equipped with NATO Role 2+ hospital facilities and a workshop for helicopter operations and a machine shop for repairs on the hull and equipment on engines. There is also an electro-mechanical workshop. Etna has a 28 m × 21 m (92 ft × 69 ft) flight deck capable of operating one helicopter of light, medium, or heavy types. The ship is fitted with a hangar that can store one AB-212, SH-3D, NH-90 or EH-101 helicopter. The ship has four replenishment at sea (RAS) systems, two of which are capable of transferring solid stores and one aft, which can only be used for refueling.

The vessel is fitted for but not with an OTO Melara close-in weapon system (CIWS) and a Selex fire control system and electronic support measures. Etna is armed with two 25-millimetre (0.98 in)/90-calibre machine guns. The ship is equipped with a Selex RASS surface search radar. As a command ship, Etna also features two staff rooms and an operations room.

=== Prometheus subclass ===
The second ship of the class, the Greek HS Prometheus, has similar characteristics to Etna, but significant differences in armament. Prometheus is armed with eight Rheinmetall 20 mm (0.79 in) guns and smaller, portable arms. The ship can also operate and store a single S-70B-6 Aegean Hawk helicopter. The vessel is fitted with AN/SPS-10D surface search radar.

== Ships in class ==
Etna class construction data
| Hull number | Ship | Builder | Launched | Commissioned | Status |
|---|---|---|---|---|---|
| A 5326 | Etna | Fincantieri | 12 July 1997 | 29 July 1998 | In service |
| A-374 | Prometheus | Elefsis Shipyards | 19 February 2002 | 8 July 2003 | In service |

== Construction and career ==
=== Etna ===
Fincantieri shipyards were awarded the contract for Etna in July 1995, and the ship was launched on 12 July 1997. The ship was delivered to the Italian Navy in February 1998, with the vessel commissioning on 29 July. Etna's main role is to fully support the long-range missions of a naval squadron, which would typically include an aircraft carrier and complete escort. Additionally, Etna has to be in position to refuel the squadron, including the air wing of the carrier, and also provide full logistic support in terms of repair workshops, spare parts, ammunition replenishment and supplies. The ship can play a crucial role in civil protection operations when asked. The ship has high autonomous capacity to provide electrical power, fresh water and prepared meals and also has fully equipped hospital and medical facilities on board. The ship has often participated in national and multinational naval exercises. The vessel served as part of Italy's commitment to Operation Enduring Freedom in the Arabian Sea and Persian Gulf in 1999/2000 and again in 2006. In 2004, Etna operated in the western Mediterranean Sea as part of Operation Active Endeavour. In 2009/2010, Etna operated in the Arabian Sea and Indian Ocean as part of the multinational effort to combat piracy off the coast of Somalia as part of Operation Atalanta.

=== HS Prometheus ===
The construction of HS Prometheus began in Elefsina on 18 February 2000, at the Elefsis Shipyards. The ship was launched on 19 February 2002, and commissioned into the Hellenic Navy on 8 July 2003.

== Gallery ==
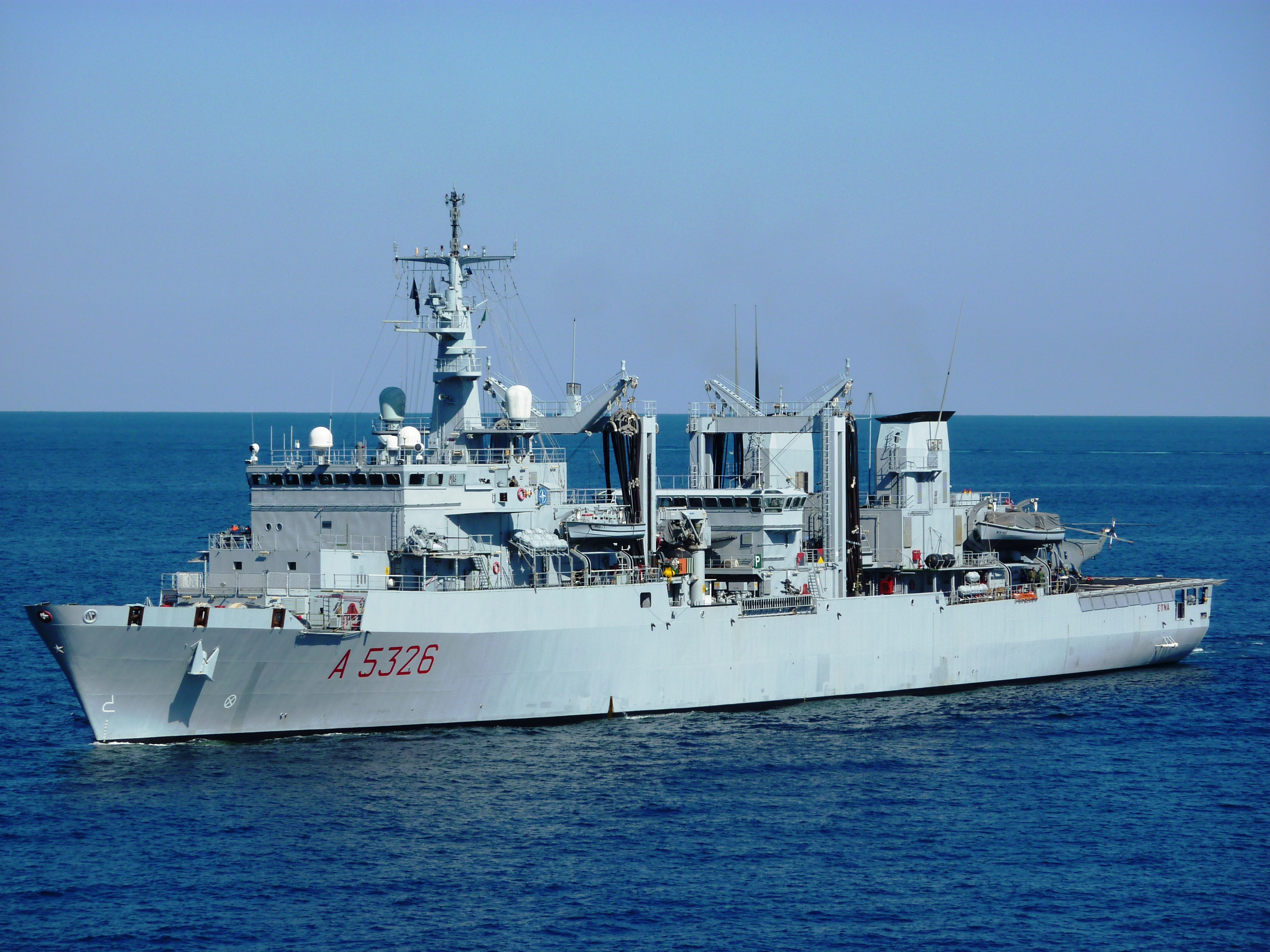
Etna in 2011

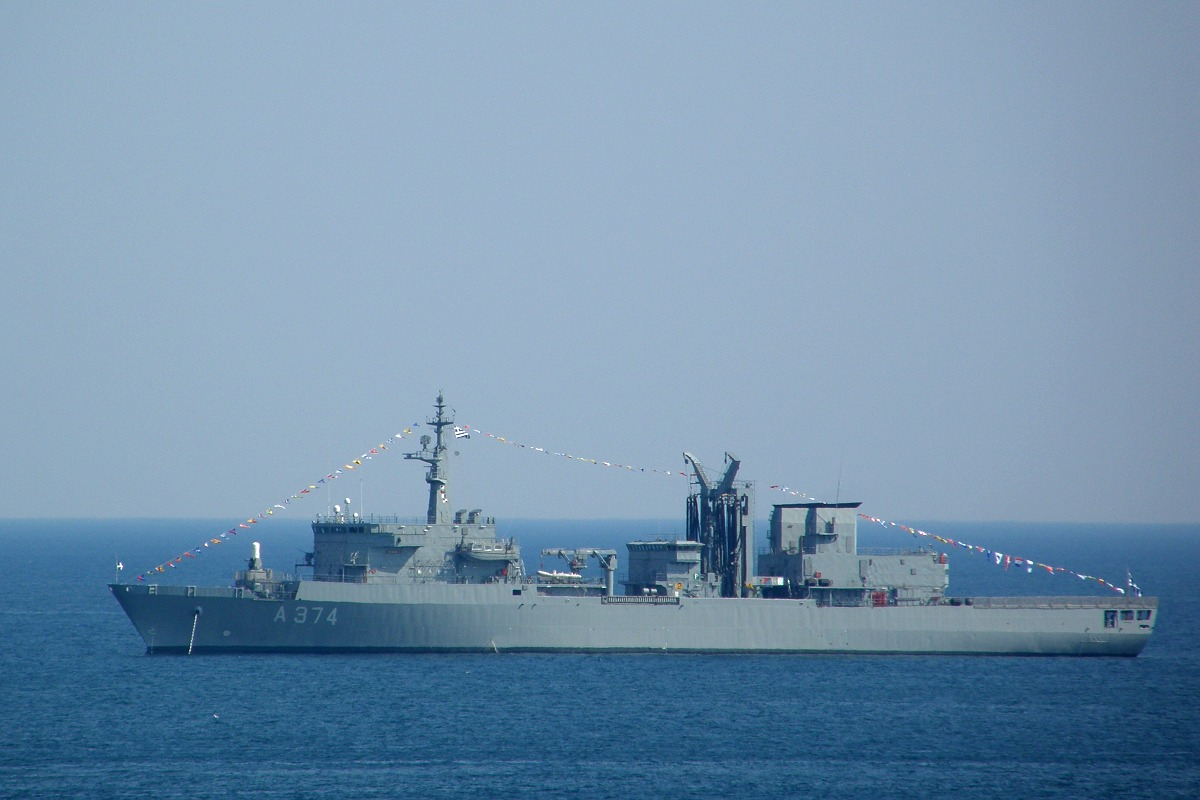
HS Prometheus at Faliron Bay in 2008

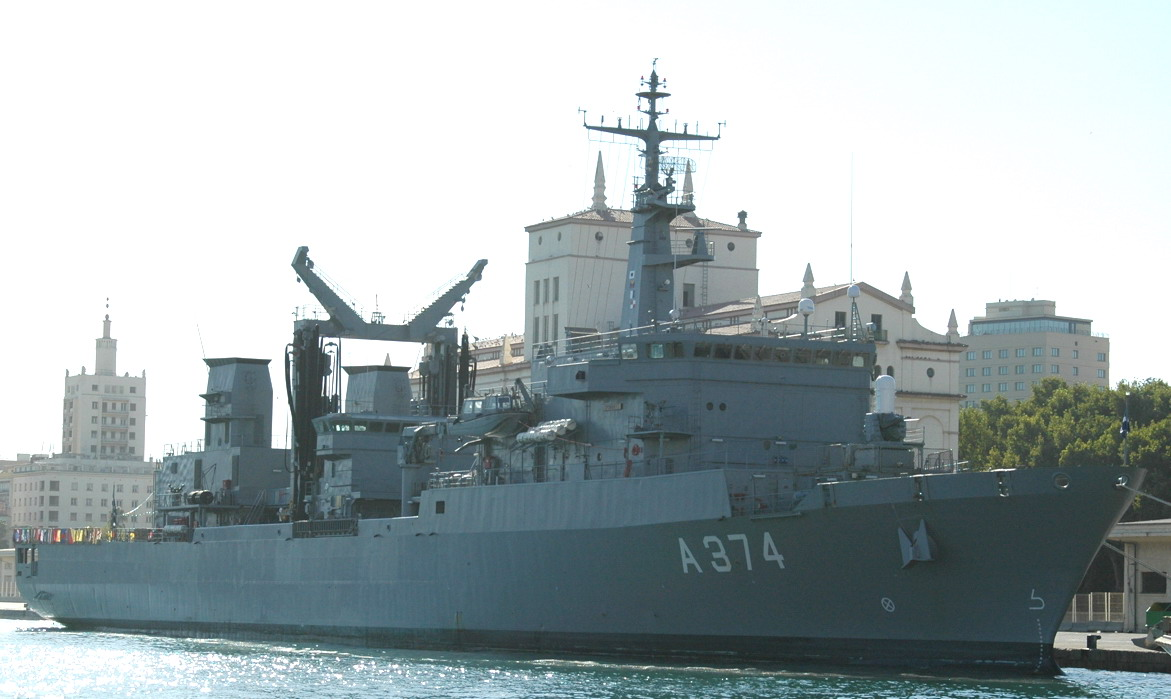
HS Prometheus at the port of Málaga in 2005

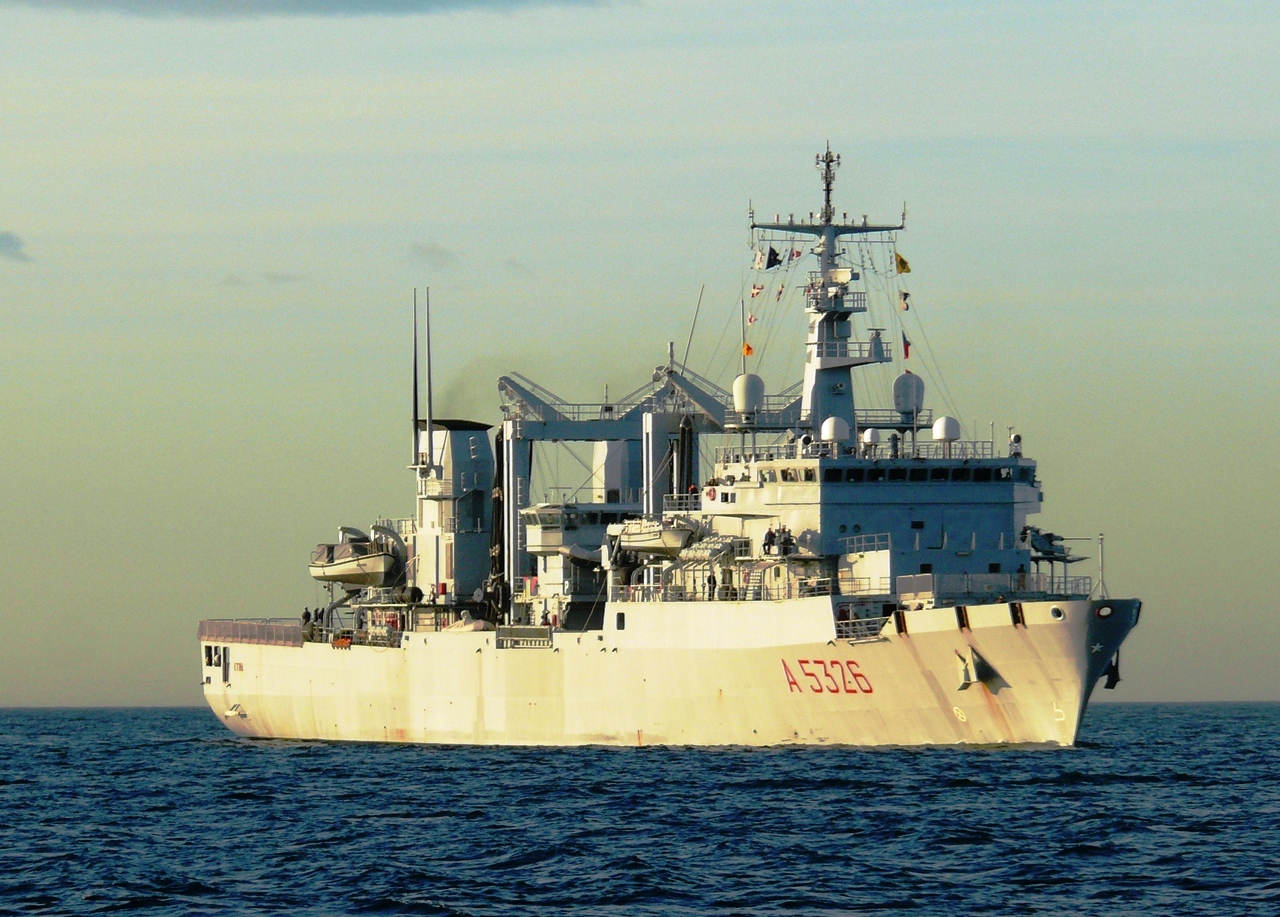
Etna at the port of Cartagena, Spain in 2011
