= Paul Yoon =

American writer (born 1980)

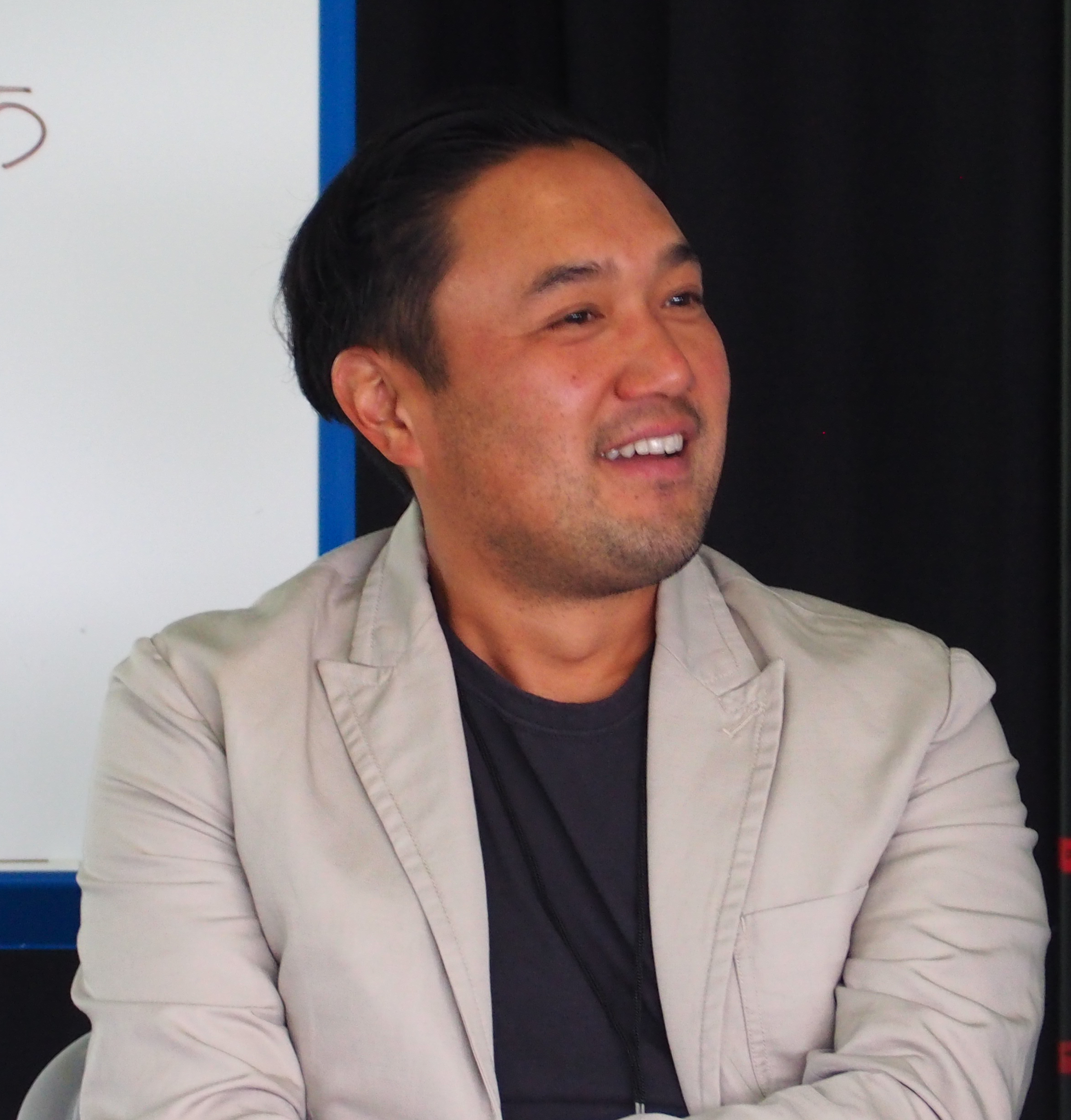
- Born: 1980 (age 45–46); New York, New York, U.S.
- Education: Phillips Exeter Academy
- Alma mater: Wesleyan University
- Occupations: Writer, novelist
- Spouse: Laura van den Berg
- Writing career
- Notable work: Run Me to Earth (2020)
- Website: www.paulyoon.com

Paul Yoon (born 1980) is an American fiction writer. In 2010, the National Book Foundation named him a 5 Under 35 honoree. He is the recipient of the 2021 Guggenheim Fellowship.

== Early life and education ==
Yoon's grandfather was a North Korean refugee who resettled in South Korea, where he later founded an orphanage. Yoon graduated from Phillips Exeter Academy in 1998 and Wesleyan University in 2002.

== Career ==
His first book, Once the Shore, was selected as a New York Times Notable Book; a Los Angeles Times, San Francisco Chronicle, Publishers Weekly, and Minneapolis Star Tribune Best Book of the Year; and a National Public Radio Best Debut of the Year. His work has appeared in the PEN/O. Henry Prize Stories collection, and he is the recipient of a 5 Under 35 Award from the National Book Foundation. His novel Snow Hunters won the 2014 New York Public Library Young Lions Fiction Award. His 2023 story collection, The Hive and the Honey, won The Story Prize for short story collections published in 2023.

Formerly a part of the faculty of the Bennington Writing Seminars, Yoon is now a senior lecturer at Harvard University.

== Personal life ==
Yoon lives in Cambridge, Massachusetts with his wife, Laura van den Berg.

== Works ==
=== Novels ===
- 2013: Snow Hunters, ISBN 9781476714813
- 2020: Run Me to Earth, ISBN 9781501154041
- 2026: Etna, ISBN 978-1-6680-2082-1

=== Short story collections ===
- 2009: Once the Shore, ISBN 9781932511703
- 2017: The Mountain, ISBN 9781501154089
- 2023: The Hive and the Honey, ISBN 978-1-6680-2079-1
