= Italian ship Etna (A 5326) =

Replenishment oiler of the Italian Navy

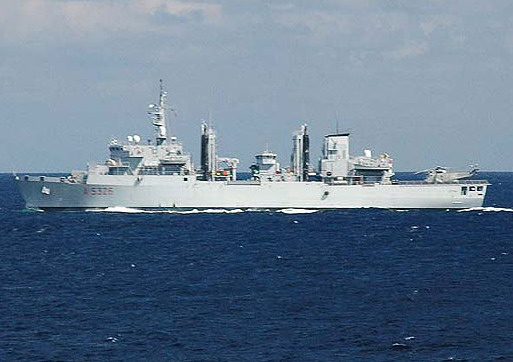
- Etna at sea in 2005

History

Italy
- Name: Etna
- Ordered: 3 January 1995
- Builder: Italcantieri - Cantieri Navali del Tirreno e Riuniti, Riva Trigoso
- Laid down: 4 July 1995
- Launched: 12 July 1997
- Commissioned: 29 August 1998
- Identification: - Pennant number: A 5326; - Hull number: 5957

General characteristics
- Class & type: Etna-class replenishment oiler
- Displacement: 13,400 tons
- Length: 146 m (479 ft)
- Beam: 21 m (69 ft)
- Draft: 7.5 m (25 ft)
- Propulsion: Two diesel engines driving twin screws
- Speed: 21 knots (39 km/h; 24 mph)
- Range: 7,600 nmi (14,100 km; 8,700 mi) at a speed of 18 knots (33 km/h; 21 mph)
- Sensors & processing systems: 1 x Selex ES RASS radar; 2 x GEM Elettronica navigation radars, I band (SPN-753 and SPN-754)
- Armament: 2 x OTO Melara KBA 25/80 mm
- Aircraft carried: 1 helicopter
- Aviation facilities: flight deck 28 x 21 m; hangar for 1 x AW-101 class helicopters

Etna is an auxiliary ship that entered service with the Marina Militare in 1998. She is designed to support fleet operations with fuel and dry stores. Etna is the single Italian vessel of the Etna class while a sister ship, HS Prometheus, was built under licence in Greece and entered service with the Hellenic Navy in 2003.

== Design and construction ==
Etna is the fifth Italian ship to bear the name. She was ordered in July 1995, and was built by Fincantieri at the Riva Trigoso Naval Shipyard. She was launched in July 1997, and underwent sea trials during November before delivery to the Italian Navy in February 1998.

Etna is designed as a support ship able to supply a larger squadron at sea. As such, she has the capability to refuel ships, produce fresh water, and carry cargo. She has a cargo capacity of up to 5,795 tons of diesel fuel, 1,585 tons of aviation fuel for aircraft on aircraft carriers, 160 tons of fresh water, up to twelve containers, for about total 2,000 m3 of solid goods. She has a length between perpendiculars of 138.8 metres (455 ft), and an overall length of 146 metres (479 ft). Her beam is 21 metres (69 ft), and she draws 7.5 metres (25 ft). She is powered by two Sulzer diesel engines, which drive two propellers through reduction gearing. This system gives Etna a speed of 21 knots (39 km/h; 24 mph), though she has the greatest range (7,600 nautical miles (14,100 km; 8,700 mi)) at a speed of 18 knots (33 km/h; 21 mph).

=== Armament ===
Etna is equipped with minimal armament and an electronic warfare support measures system. The ship is also equipped with an Alenia Marconi Systems radar, a Selex command system and an Elmer MAC communications system.

== Service history ==
In March 2011, Etna was deployed to the coast of Libya as part of Operation Unified Protector, a NATO operation to enforce an arms embargo on Libya.

As of 2023, the ship is envisaged for a life-extension refit pending the arrival of a replacement vessel from the new Vulcano-class logistic support ships.
