= Grant Evans (scholar) =

Australian anthropologist (1948–2014)

- Born: Grant Richard James Evans; 11 October 1948; Berri, South Australia, Australia
- Died: 16 September 2014 (aged 65); Sikhottabong District, Vientiane Municipality, Laos
- Spouse: Keomany Somvandy
- Children: 1

Academic background
- Education: La Trobe University

Academic work
- Discipline: Anthropologist
- Institutions: University of Hong Kong; École française d'Extrême-Orient
- Main interests: Laos

Grant Richard James Evans (11 October 1948 – 16 September 2014) was an Australian anthropologist notable for his works on Laos.

== Life ==
Grant was born in Berri, South Australia, on 11 October 1948.

He received his Ph.D. from La Trobe in 1983, and for many years taught anthropology at the University of Hong Kong.

In 2005, he moved permanently to Vientiane, where he was a senior research fellow at the École française d'Extrême-Orient.

He died in Vientiane on 16 September 2014.

== Notable works ==
As author:

- The Yellow Rainmakers: Are Chemical Weapons Being Used in Southeast Asia?. London: Verso. 1983. ISBN 0-86091-068-7.
- Red Brotherhood at War: Indochina since the Fall of Saigon. Co-authored with Kelvin Rowley. London: Verso. 1984. ISBN 0-86091-090-3. Revised edition: Red Brotherhood at War: Vietnam, Cambodia and Laos since 1975. London: Verso. 1990. ISBN 0-86091-501-8.
- Agrarian Change in Communist Laos. Singapore: Institute of Southeast Asian Studies. 1988. ISBN 981-3035-16-1.
- Lao Peasants under Socialism. New Haven: Yale University Press. 1990. ISBN 0-300-04598-0. Revised edition: Lao Peasants under Socialism and Post-Socialism. Chiang Mai: Silkworm Books. 1995. ISBN 974-7047-45-4.
- The Politics of Ritual and Remembrance: Laos since 1975. Honolulu: University of Hawai'i Press. 1998. ISBN 974-7100-60-6.
- A Short History of Laos: The Land in Between. Crows Nest, New South Wales: Allen & Unwin. 2002. ISBN 1-86448-997-9.
- The Last Century of Lao Royalty: A Documentary History. Chiang Mai: Silkworm Books. 2009. ISBN 978-974-9511-66-4.

As editor:

- Asia's Cultural Mosaic: An Anthropological Introduction. New York: Prentice Hall. 1993. ISBN 0-13-052812-9.
- Hong Kong: The Anthropology of a Chinese Metropolis. Co-edited with Maria Tam. Honolulu: University of Hawai'i Press. 1997. ISBN 0-8248-2005-3.
- Laos: Culture and Society. Chiang Mai: Silkworm Books. 1999. ISBN 974-87090-4-3.
- Where China Meets Southeast Asia: Social and Cultural Change in the Border Regions. Co-edited with Christopher Hutton and Kuah Khun Eng. Singapore: Institute of Southeast Asian Studies. 2000. ISBN 981-230-040-6.
