= Etna (novel) =

2026 novel by Paul Yoon

- 1st edition cover
- Author: Paul Yoon
- Cover artist: Oliver Munday
- Language: English
- Published: 2026 (Scribner)
- Pages: 208
- ISBN: 978-1-668-02082-1

Etna is a 2026 novel by Paul Yoon. It received positive reviews upon release.

== Plot ==
Etna, a young dog, is taken from his home on a coastal farm and drafted as a combat dog. When the war ends, he escapes his unit and embarks on a journey home.

== Development history ==
Yoon was initially inspired to write a novel from the perspective of a dog by his own pet dog, Oscar, saying that he "began to wonder what the world look like through Oscar's eyes." He chose to set the novel during wartime because of the experience of his grandparents, who fled North Korea during the Korean War and eventually immigrated to the United States.

=== Publication history ===
The novel was released in the United States by Scribner on August 4, 2026.

== Reception ==
Etna received positive reception from critics upon release. Fiona Maazel, writing in The New York Times, described the novel as being "a tear-jerker" and praised Yoon's representation of war and its aftermath. The Atlantic positively compared the book to Henry Hoke's 2023 novel Open Throat and noted the various allusions to The Odyssey.

Shelf Awareness, Booklist, and Publishers Weekly all published starred reviews of the book. Shelf Awareness praised the plot and described the book as "elegant," while Booklist focused on the novel's prose. Publishers Weekly praised Yoon's writing for "convincingly captur[ing] a dog's perspective." Kirkus Reviews, meanwhile, was more mixed, complimenting the prose but criticizing the book for leaning into sentimentality.
