= Aetna Township =

Aetna Township may refer to the following places in the United States:

- Aetna Township, Logan County, Illinois
- Aetna Township, Kansas
- Aetna Township, Mecosta County, Michigan
- Aetna Township, Missaukee County, Michigan
- Aetna Township, Minnesota
