= LG KS360 =

Mobile phone model

LG-KS360
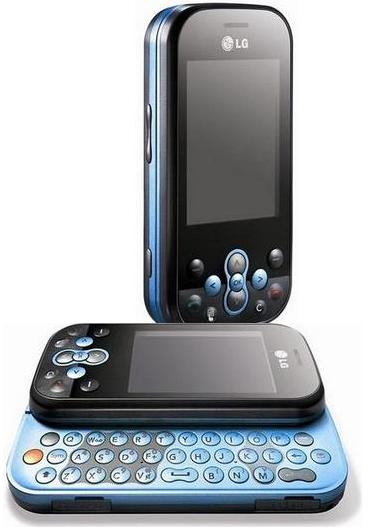
- Manufacturer: LG Electronics
- Availability by region: 2008
- Compatible networks: GPRS, EDGE, GSM 900/1800/1900
- Form factor: QWERTY slider
- Dimensions: 101.5×51×16.8 mm (4.00×2.01×0.66 in) (L * W * D)
- Weight: 115.6 g (4 oz)
- Memory: 15 MB
- Removable storage: MicroSD
- Rear camera: 2.0 megapixel, video 320x240@10fps
- Display: 262K color TFT touchscreen, 2.8", 240 x 320 (QVGA)
- Connectivity: Bluetooth 2.0

The LG KS360 is a mobile phone manufactured by LG Electronics. The model was marketed in some regions as the "Webslider" and "Neon".

== Features ==
The phone has a full QWERTY keyboard and a threaded conversation view for faster texting. It also has a heat-sensitive screen that can be used for dialing numbers. The phone supports MicroSD cards of up to 4GB in size. The phone has Bluetooth 2.0, and WAP and GPRS were used to connect to the internet. The phone also has a numeric keypad and several other features. The phone was available in black with blue, light pink and black, black and silver and red and pink as well as white and green.
