= Etna, Illinois =

Etna
- Unincorporated community
- Location of Etna within Illinois Etna (the United States)
- Coordinates: 39°23′22″N 88°25′11″W
- Country: United States
- State: Illinois
- County: Coles
- Township: Paradise
- Elevation: 656 ft (200 m)
- Time zone: UTC-6 (CST)
  - Summer (DST): UTC-5 (CDT)

Etna (formerly Aetna) is an unincorporated community in Coles County, Illinois, United States. It lies at an elevation of 656 feet (200 m).

The community is part of the Charleston–Mattoon Micropolitan Statistical Area.

== History ==
A variant name was "Aetna". A post office called Etna was established in 1859, and remained in operation until 1943. The community was named after Mount Etna, on Sicily.
