= Mount Aetna =

Mount Aetna may refer to:

- Mount Etna, a stratovolcano in Sicily.
- Mount Aetna (Colorado), a mountain in Colorado
- Mount Aetna, Maryland, a census-designated place in the United States
- Mount Aetna, Pennsylvania, an unincorporated community in the United States
