= HMS Aetna =

Ten ships of the Royal Navy have been named HMS Aetna (historically spelled Ætna) or HMS Etna, after the volcano Etna:

- HMS Aetna (1691) was an 8-gun fireship launched in 1691 and captured by the French in 1697.
- HMS Aetna (1739) was an 8-gun fireship purchased in 1739 and sold in 1746.
- HMS Etna (1756) was an 8-gun fireship purchased in 1756. She was converted into a sloop later that year and was sold in 1763.
- HMS Etna (1771) was an 8-gun fireship purchased in 1771. She was renamed HMS Scorpion and converted into a sloop later that year and was sold in 1780.
- HMS Aetna (1776) was an 8-gun bomb vessel launched in 1776 and broken up in 1784.
- HMS Aetna (or Etna) was a French 20-gun Etna-class corvette that HMS Melampus and HMS Childers captured from the French in 1796. The Royal Navy rated her as a sixth rate and renamed her HMS Cormorant in 1797; she was wrecked in 1800.
- HMS Aetna (1803) was the mercantile Success launched in 1803 at Littlehampton. The Admiralty purchased here in 1803 to convert her to a Royal Navy an 8-gun bomb vessel. The Navy sold her in 1816 and she returned to mercantile service under her original name. She was wrecked in 1823.
- HMS Aetna (1824) was a 6-gun bomb vessel launched in 1824. She was converted to a survey ship in 1826 and was sold in 1846.
- HMS Aetna (1855) was a 14-gun Aetna-class ironclad screw floating battery. She was laid down in 1854, but caught fire and launched herself in 1855. She was broken up on the riverbank.
- HMS Aetna (1856) was a 16-gun lengthened Aetna-class screw ironclad floating battery launched in 1856. She was used for harbour service from 1866, was burnt out in 1873 and broken up in 1874.
- HMS Aetna (1883) was a Malta-class 530-ton iron paddle dockyard tug built by Laird Brothers, Birkenhead. She was scrapped in 1929.
